= List of straits in Estonia =

This is the list of straits located in Estonia. The list is incomplete.

Name	Name in Estonian	Further info	Location (county)	Coordinates
Aksi salm	Aksi salm	Harju County	Between Aksi and Prangli	
Hari Strait	Hari kurk		Between Hiiumaa and Vormsi	
Irbe Strait	Kura kurk, Irbe väin		Between Sõrve peninsula (Saaremaa) and Courland Peninsula (in Latvia)	
Käkisilm	Käkisilm	Saare County	Between Vilsandi and Saaremaa	
Kihnu Strait	Kihnu väin	Pärnu County	Between Kihnu and Continental Estoni	
Kurkse Strait	Kurkse väin	Harju County	Between Pakri Islands and Continental Estonia	59°17′34″N 23°58′43″E
Soela Strait	Soela väin		Between Saaremaa and Hiiumaa	58°40′00″N 22°32′00″E
Suur salm	Suur salm	Harju County	Between Aegna and Kräsuli	
Suur Strait	Suur väin		Between Muhu and Continental Estonia	
Väike salm	Väike salm	Harju County	Between Kräsuli and Viimsi peninsula (Continental Estonia)	
Väike Strait	Väike väin	Saare County	Between Muhu and Saaremaa	
Viire kurk	Viire kurk		Between Viirelaid and Virtsu Peninsula (Continental Estonia)	
Voosi Strait	Voosi kurk	Lääne County	Between Vormsi and Noarootsi Peninsula (Continental Estonia)	59°00′N 23°24′E

== See also ==
- List of straits
