= Heliport =

Airport designed for helicopter use

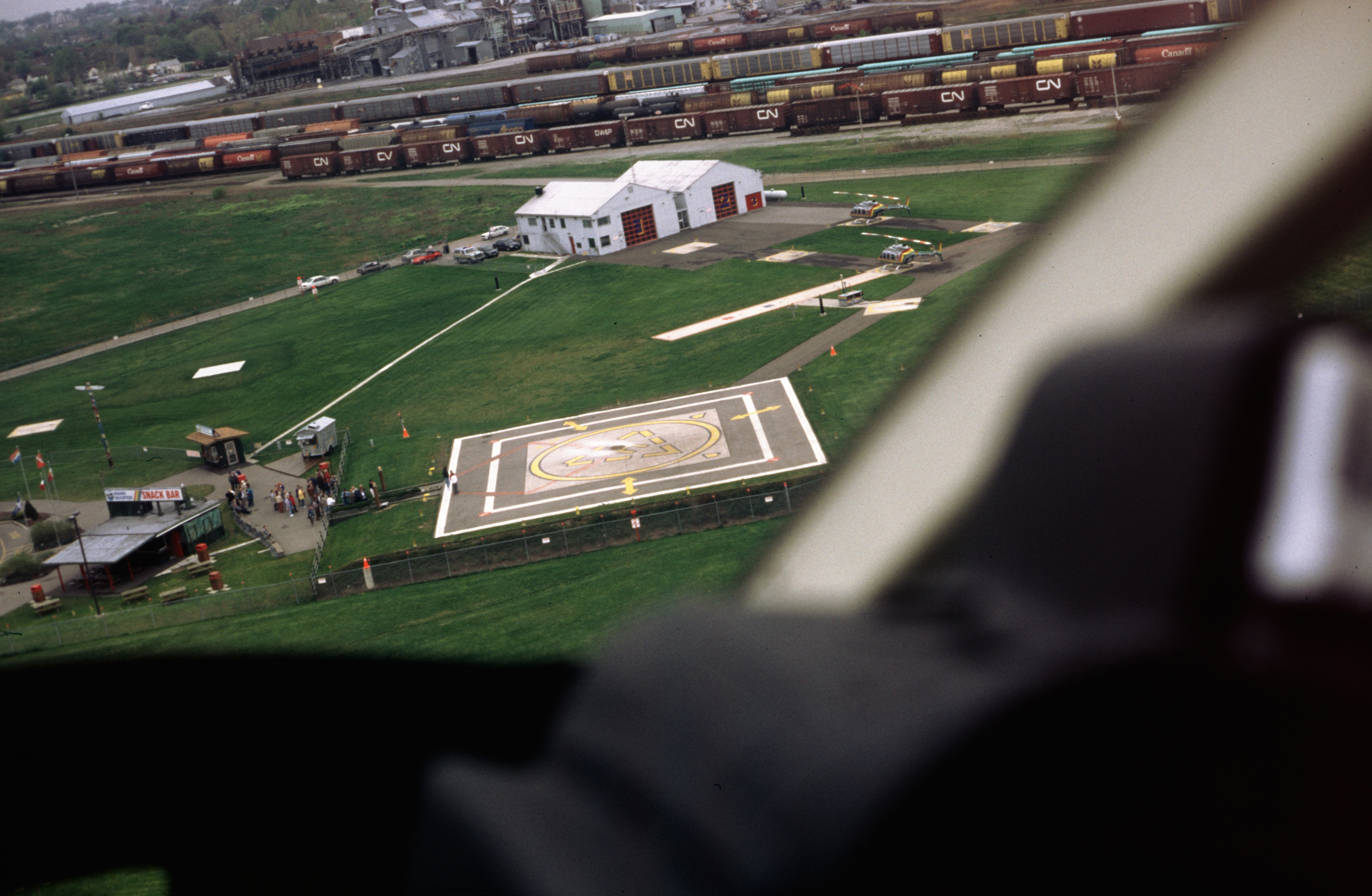
A heliport at Niagara Falls, Ontario, Canada

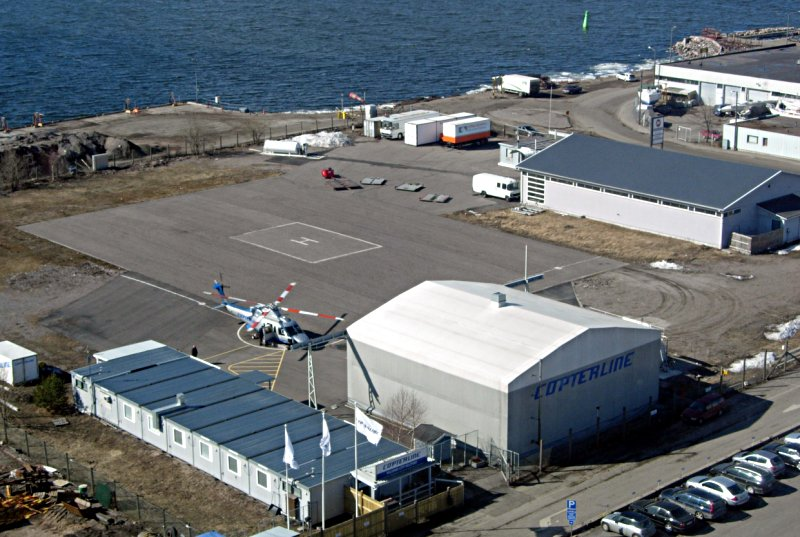
The Hernesaari Heliport in Hernesaari, Helsinki, Finland

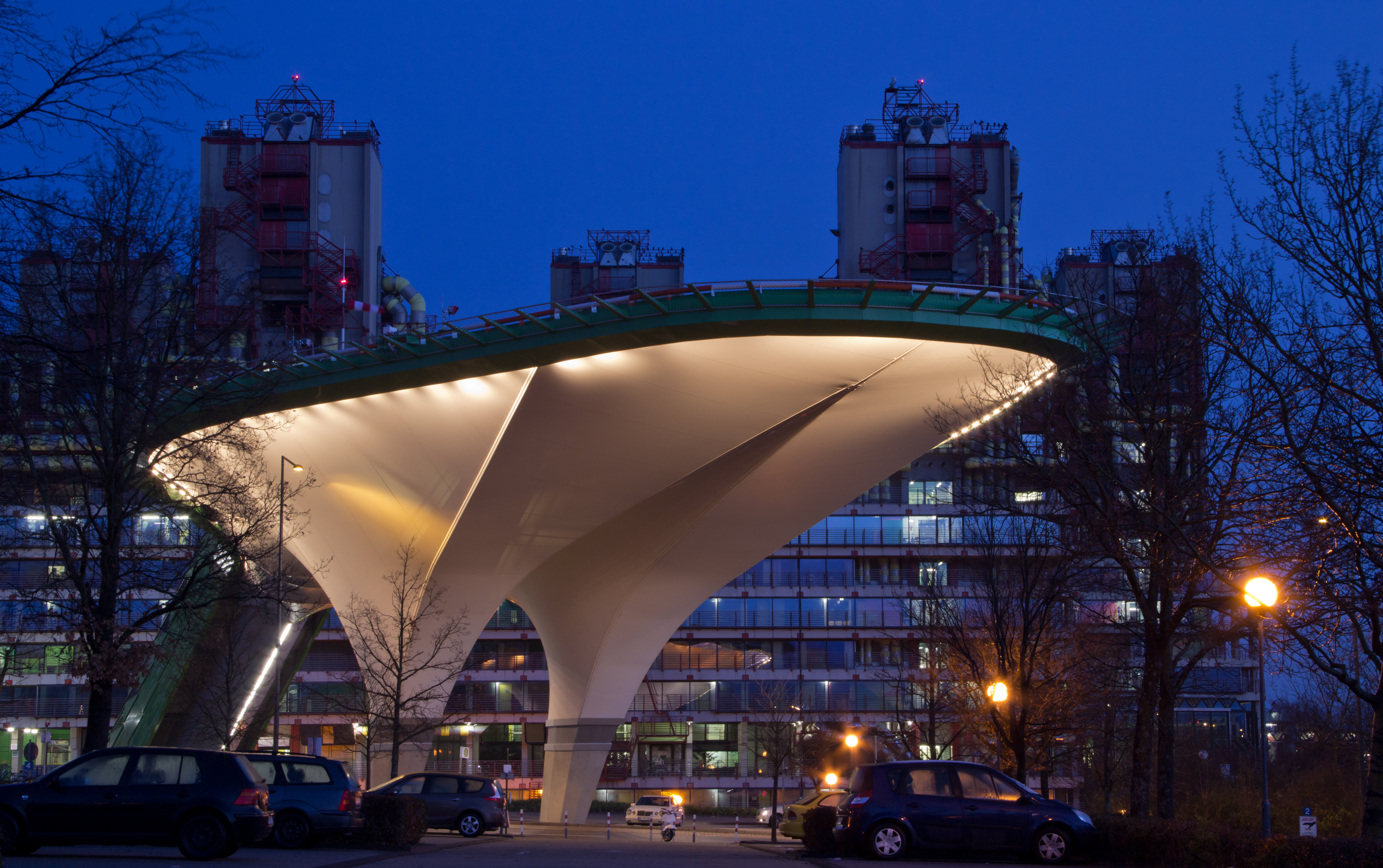
Heliport of Uniklinikum Aachen, North Rhine-Westphalia, Germany

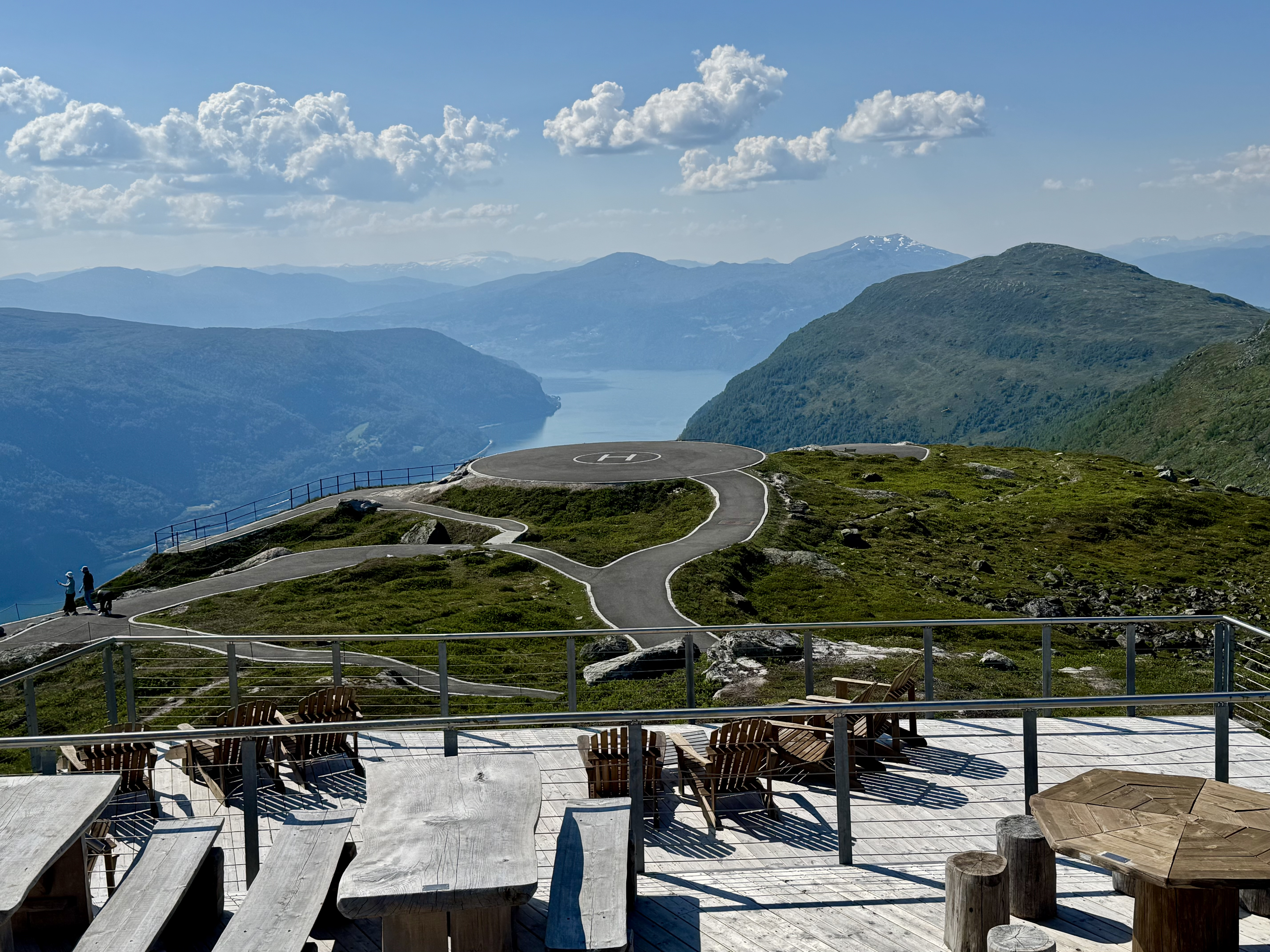
Heliport in the mountains of Loen, Norway

A heliport is a small airport which has a helipad, suitable for use by helicopters, powered-lift craft, and other types of vertical-lift aircraft.

Designated heliports typically contain one or more touchdown and liftoff areas and may also have limited facilities such as fuel or hangars. In some larger towns and cities, customs facilities may also be available. The broader term vertiport refers to take-off/landing sites for all aircraft landing vertically.

Early advocates of helicopters hoped that heliports would become widespread, but they have become contentious in urban areas due to the excessive noise caused by helicopter traffic.

In American use a heliport is defined as "an area of land, water, or structure used or intended to be used for the landing and takeoff of helicopters and includes its buildings and facilities if any". A heliport will consist of one or more helipads, which are defined as "a small, designated area, usually with a prepared surface, on a heliport, airport, landing/take-off area, apron/ramp, or movement area used for takeoff, landing, or parking of helicopters".

In Canada the term heliport is legally only used for an aerodrome certified for helicopter use.

== Heliport airspace ==
The airspace immediately surrounding the heliport is called the primary surface. This area coincides in shape and size with the designated take-off and landing area. This surface is a horizontal plane equal to the elevation of the established heliport elevation. The primary surface is further broken down into three distinct regions: the touch-down and lift-off (TLOF) area, the final approach and takeoff (FATO) area, and the safety area.

The TLOF area is a load-bearing, generally paved area, normally centered in the FATO area, on which the helicopter lands or takes off. The FATO area is a defined area over which the pilot completes the final phase of the approach to a hover or landing, and from which the pilot initiates take-off. The FATO area elevation is the lowest elevation of the edge of the TLOF area. The safety area is a defined area on a heliport surrounding the FATO area intended to reduce the risk of damage to helicopters accidentally diverging from the FATO area.

== Purpose ==
In a large metropolitan and urban areas, a heliport can serve passengers needing to quickly move within the city or to and from outlying regions. Generally, heliports can be situated closer to a town or city center than an airport for fixed-wing aircraft. The advantage in flying by helicopter to a destination, or even to the city's main airport, is that travel can be much faster than by surface transport. As an example, the Downtown Manhattan Heliport in New York City provides scheduled service to John F. Kennedy International Airport, and is used to move persons and important goods quickly to destinations as far away as Maryland.

Police departments use heliports as bases for police helicopters, and larger departments may have large dedicated heliport facilities such as the LAPD Hooper Heliport.

Some skyscrapers feature rooftop heliports to serve the transport needs of executives or clients. Many of these rooftop sites also serve as Emergency Helicopter Landing Facilities (EHLF), in case emergency evacuation is needed. The U.S. Bank Tower in Los Angeles is an example.

Helipads are common features at hospitals, where they serve to facilitate helicopter air ambulance and MEDEVACs for transferring patients into and out of hospital facilities. Some large trauma centers may have multiple helipads, while most small hospitals have just one. Helipads allow hospitals to accept patients flown in from remote accident sites, where there are no local hospitals or facilities capable of providing the level of emergency care required.

The National EMS Pilots Association (NEMSPA) has published multiple white papers, surveys and safety recommendations for the enhancement of hospital helipad operations to improve patient safety.

== Heliport markings ==
While heliports can be oriented in any direction, they will generally have very definitive approach and departure paths. However, heliports aren't numbered in the same way runways at airports are. Recommended standard practice by both the Federal Aviation Administration (FAA) and the International Civil Aviation Organization (ICAO) is to orient an H in the center of the TLOF area aligned with the preferred approach and departure direction.

An information box should also be included in the TLOF area, which provides the aircraft gross weight the helipad is rated for, as well as the maximum size helicopter the helipad has been designed to accommodate, which is based on the helicopter rotor diameter and overall length of the largest design helicopter that will service the helipad. Under normal conditions, it is standard practice to paint the maximum gross weight a helipad is designed to support in either metric tonnes, kilograms, or thousands of pounds, along with the maximum helicopter dimensions in metres or feet. Arrows are oftentimes painted on the heliport to indicate to pilots the preferred approach and departure paths. Other common markings can include ownership, radio frequencies, company logo(s), and magnetic north.

== Lighting ==
To conduct night-time operations, a heliport must have lighting installed that meets specific aeronautical standards. Heliport perimeter lights are generally installed around the TLOF area, and may be flush mounted on the TLOF itself, or mounted just off the TLOF perimeter on short metal or concrete extensions.

One alternative to lighting the TLOF if certain criteria are met, is to light the area of the FATO instead. Some locations, due to environmental conditions, illuminate the TLOF and FATO. Lighting should never constitute an obstruction that a helicopter may impact, and for this reason, in the U.S., heliport lighting is not allowed to extend above the TLOF or FATO more than 2 inches (51 millimetres). Current standards recommend that all perimeter lighting be green. Prior standards recommended amber lighting for perimeter lights; however this wavelength has been shown to interfere with night vision goggle (NVG) operations, when used with older incandescent lighting.

In the past, lighting has been traditionally incandescent, but increasingly, light-emitting diodes (LEDs) are being incorporated, due to lower power requirements and increased life. While flood lights may be used to enhance surface operations, they should not interfere with flight crew night vision, and should be kept off during flight operations, and only used when conducting ground movement operations. To conduct night operations, a lighted wind cone is also required. At ground-based heliports, lead-in lights may be incorporated to identify the preferred approach / departure direction. Visual slope guidance systems (such as HAPI, PAPI, etc.) are recommended options in both ICAO and FAA documents. While airports commonly use 6.6A direct current power, heliport lighting is normally AC powered. Radio control of the lighting by the pilot via an automated ground-based controller is also common.

== Approach / departure airspace ==
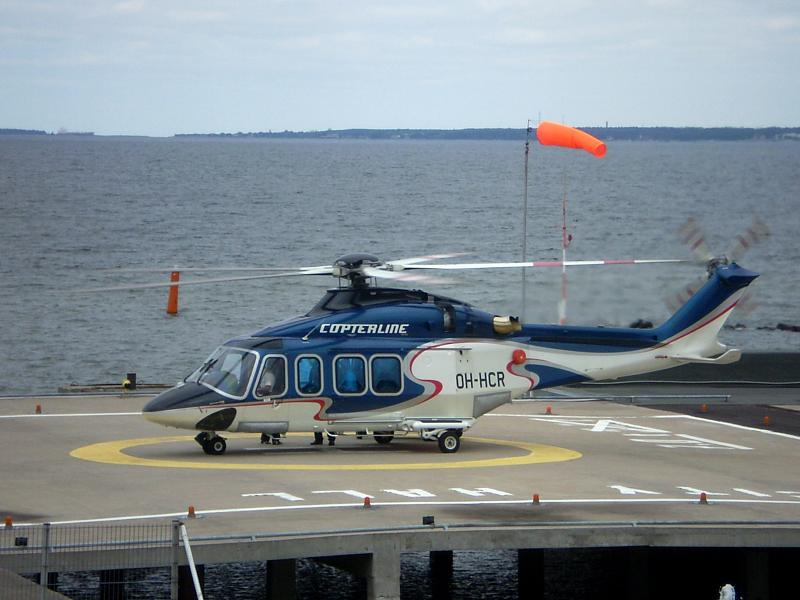
Copterline helicopter at the heliport of Linnahall in Tallinn, Estonia

To provide for a safe environment to perform normal helicopter landing and take-off operations, each heliport must have unobstructed approach / departure paths.

The minimum recommended separation between flight paths is 135 degrees. A heliport approach path is broken down into two distinct airspace surfaces; the Approach Surface, and the Transitional Surface. The approach surface begins at each end of the heliport primary surface with the same width as the primary surface, and extends outward and upward for a horizontal distance of 4,000 feet (1,200 metres), where its width is 500 feet (150 metres). The slope of the approach surface is 8-to-1 for civil heliports. The Transitional Surfaces extend outward and upward from the lateral boundaries of the primary surface, and from the approach surfaces, at a slope of 2-to-1 for a distance of 250 feet (76 metres), measured horizontally from the centerline of the primary and approach surfaces. Approach paths can either be straight or curved to accommodate obstructions and avoidance areas.

== See also ==
- Helicopter deck
- vertiport
- List of countries by number of heliports
- List of helicopter airlines
- List of heliports in Turkey
- List of heliports in Canada
- List of heliports in Singapore
- List of heliports in Washington, D.C.
