= Kumbli =

Island in Estonia

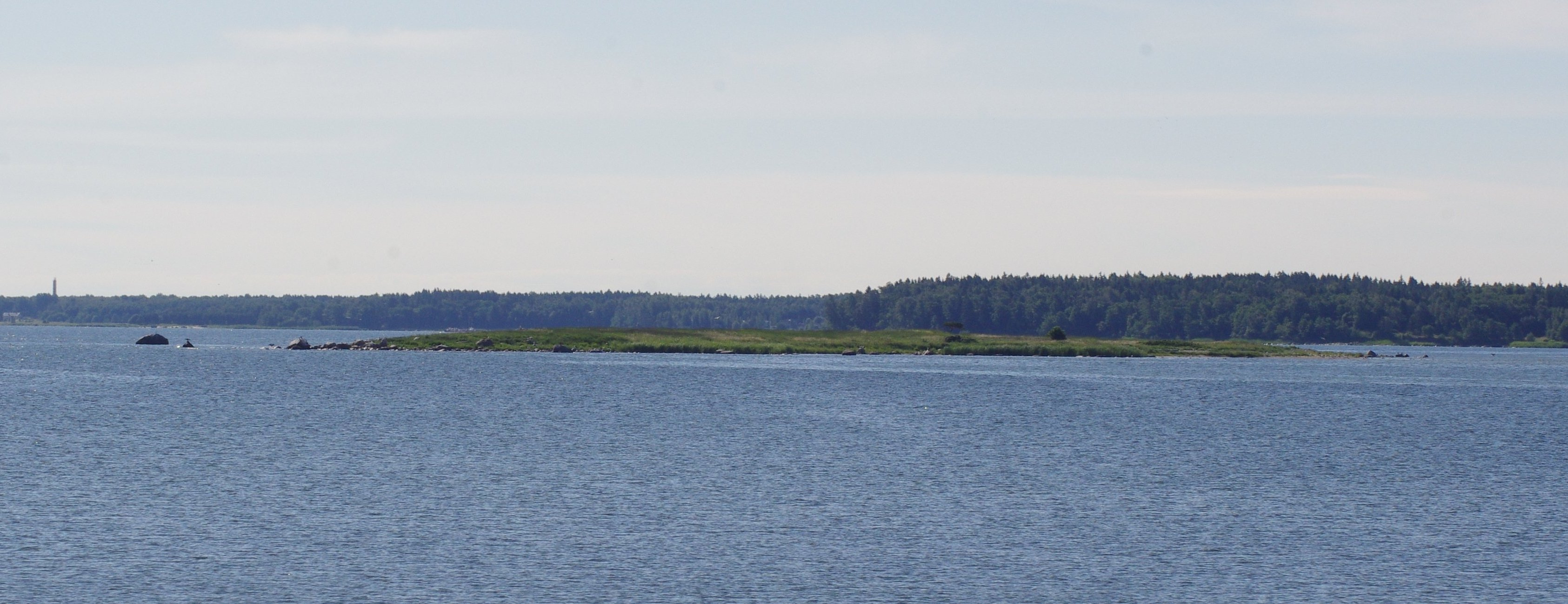
- Kumbli seen from northwest on Aegna

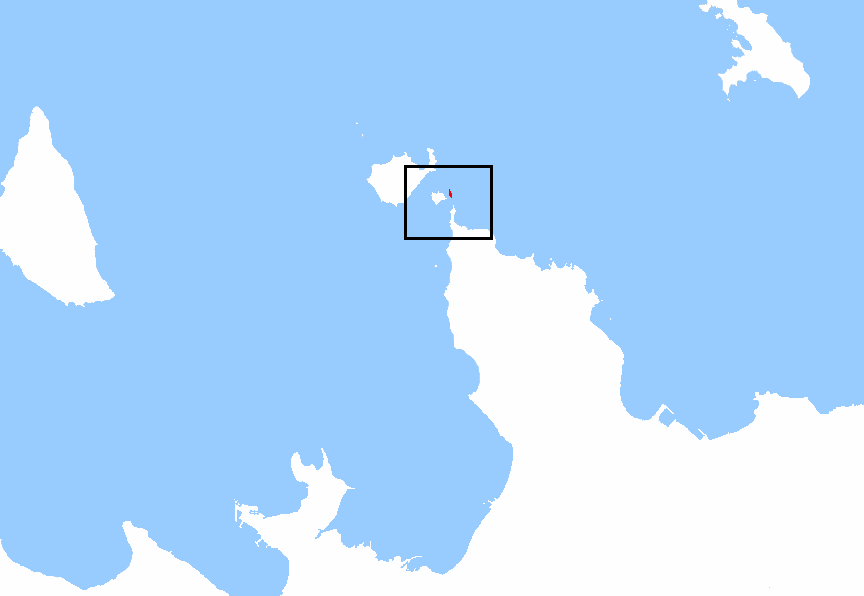
- Location of Kumbli in the vicinity of the Tallinn Bay

Geography
- Location: Gulf of Finland
- Coordinates: 59°34′32″N 24°47′39″E
- Area: 0.023 ha (0.057 acres)
- Coastline: 0.8 km (0.5 mi)
- Highest elevation: 2 m (7 ft)

Administration
- Estonia
- County: Harju County
- Municipality: Viimsi Parish
- Settlement: Rohuneeme village

Demographics
- Population: 0

Kumbli (Swedish: Kummelskär) is a 0.023 ha (0.057 acres) uninhabited islet in the Gulf of Finland, near Tallinn, Estonia. It is located 270 m (890 ft) north of the Viimsi Peninsula and 150 m (490 ft) east of the Kräsuli islet. Administratively Kumbli belongs to the Rohuneeme village in Viimsi Parish, Harju County.

On a map from 1689 the islet is marked as Komblesahr, which may refer to Estonian origin.

In 2012 there was only one Scots pine and little shrubs covering the islet.

There are no construction rights on the islet. Kumbli belongs to a local businessman Aivar Osa.

== See also ==
- List of islands of Estonia
