= Linnahall =

Multi-purpose venue in Tallinn, Estonia

- View of venue seen from the sea (2020)
- Interactive map of Linnahall
- Full name: Tallinna Linnahall (Tallinn City Hall)
- Former names: V. I. Lenin Palace of Culture and Sport (1980-91)
- Address: Sadama 1, 10111; Tallinn; Estonia
- Location: Kalamaja
- Owner: Tallinn City Government
- Operator: Tallinna Linnahalli Aktsiaselts
- Capacity: 4,200

Construction
- Groundbreaking: 1975
- Opened: 19 July 1980
- Architects: Riina Altmäe, Raine Karp

Website
- Official website

Linnahall (Estonian: Tallinna Linnahall, lit. 'Tallinn City Hall'; originally the V. I. Lenin Palace of Culture and Sports) is a semi-abandoned multipurpose venue in Tallinn, Estonia. It is located in the harbor, just beyond the walls of the Old Town, and was completed in 1980. The venue also features a heliport and a small seaport.

It is not to be confused with the primary administrative building of the historical municipal government (Raad) of Tallinn, often referred to as the Town Hall.

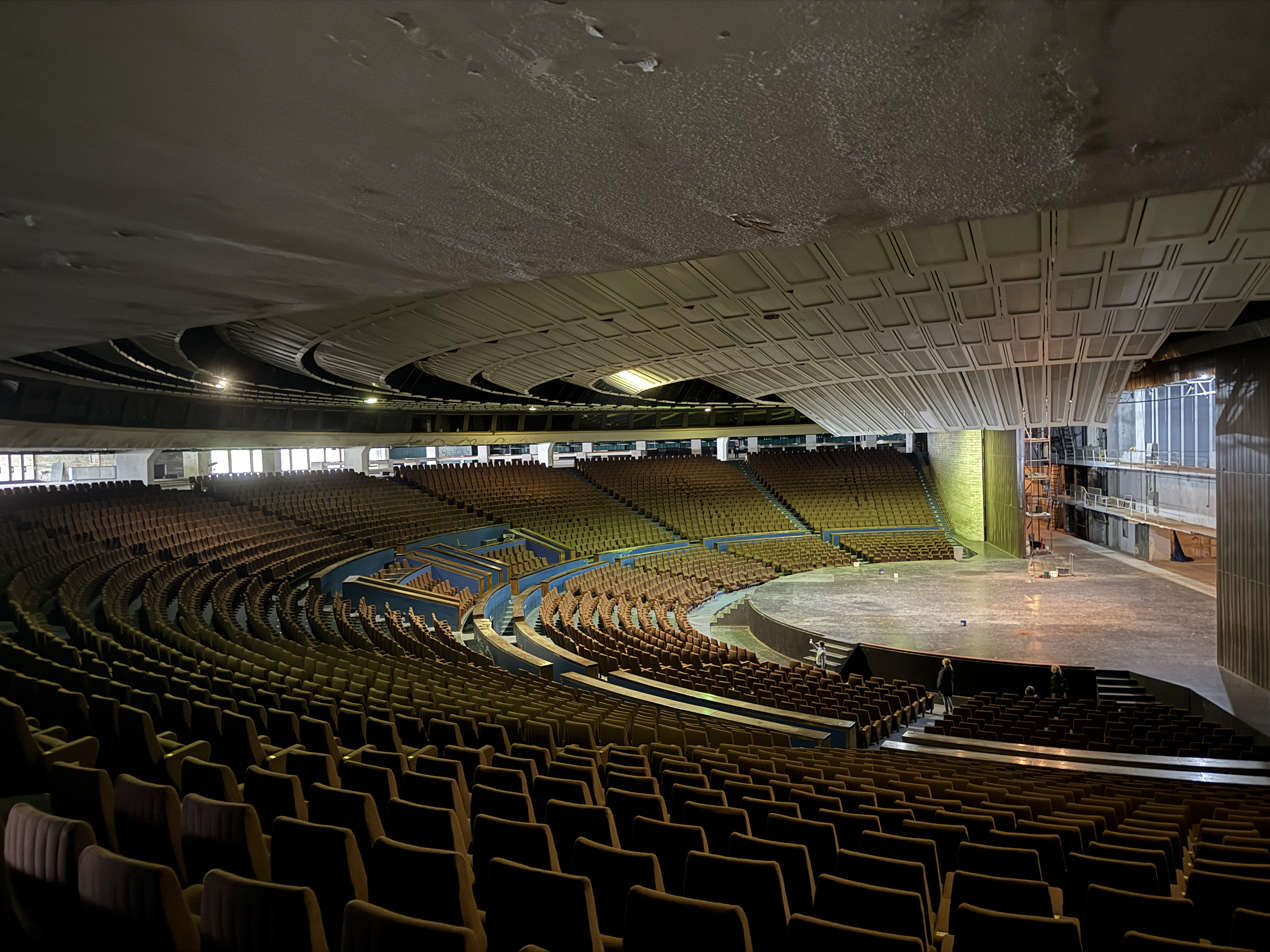
The abandoned concert hall in Linnahall 2025

== History ==
The 1980 Summer Olympics were hosted in Moscow. As inland Moscow had no suitable venue at which to stage the sailing event, this task fell to Tallinn, the capital of the then Estonian SSR. Apart from the main venue for the sailing event, Pirita Yachting Centre, a number of other sports and entertainment facilities were erected, among them the V. I. Lenin Palace of Culture and Sport. It was designed by architects Raine Karp and Riina Altmäe.

Before the Palace was built, the site had been home to the "Kukermiit" concrete factory (1946-1958), a shipyard, warehouses and small workshops. Until 1970 parts of the site had also been used by the military. The city's chief architect Dmitri Bruns was allotted the entire area to construct a cultural building, and in 1975 these buildings began to be demolished.

The venue had 540 employees when it opened. The first event to be held at the site was a celebration of the 40th anniversary of the Estonian SSR. At some point, people began to call the building "Linnahall", a name which became official in 1991.

The construction of Linnahall completely changed daily life in Tallinn. Concerts held at the venue were considered major events in the city. At the ice rink, aside from ice hockey matches, fashion shows were held along with various sporting events and rock concerts; it was also open for public skating.

According to Estonian architect Margit Mutso, the complex had been poorly constructed, despite its artistic accomplishments. Initially the stage had been intended to spin, but budget and time constraints meant this was never realised. Despite this, its location within the city, its inventive structure, unique architecture and interior design made it famous not only across the Soviet Union, but around the world.

After the dissolution of the Soviet Union, the complex began to be used in other ways. A recording studio was opened, along with professional sound equipment and stage lighting shops. The nightclub "Lucky Luke" (later renamed to "Poseidon") and a café called "Nord Café" were also opened. Inside the complex, markets for clothes and industrial goods were organised.

The ice rink closed in 2009, followed by the concert hall in 2010. The city sought investors for the complex from 2009 to 2015, to either renovate the complex or demolish it and build something in its stead. In 2015 the city council decided to renovate Linnahall, although the project did not come to fruition as deadlines were too tight and the city were unwilling to invest enough money into the project.

In 1999 a helipad was installed at Linnahall, named the Tallinn Linnahall Heliport. A small ferry dock was also installed at the complex, which was operated by Linda Line Shipping until the company was dissolved on 2nd May 2019.

In 2015, the Linnhall was one of the locations used for the filming of the music video for the song "Faded" by Norwegian artist Alan Walker. From June to July 2019, the location served as a stand-in for a Kyiv opera house during the filming of the feature film Tenet.

An inspection on 6th September 2017 declared that the complex was in bad physical condition. In November 2023, Tallinn's mayor Mihhail Kõlvart revealed new plans to develop the Linnahall site and its surrounding area. Although not explicitly stating whether the plans would involve knocking the complex down, Kõlvart admitted that "the more time passes, the more unrealistic the prospect of renovating Linnahall becomes", citing that investors are not interested in the building itself and that it is not possible to restore it to perfect condition in any case. These plans stalled, however, due to Kõlvart not sharing them with deputy mayor Madle Lippus and the director-general of Estonia's Heritage Board, which oversees Linnahall's protected status as a registered cultural monument.

As of 2023, occasional exhibitions and tours still take place at Linnahall.

== Ice Hall ==
Linnahalli Jäähall
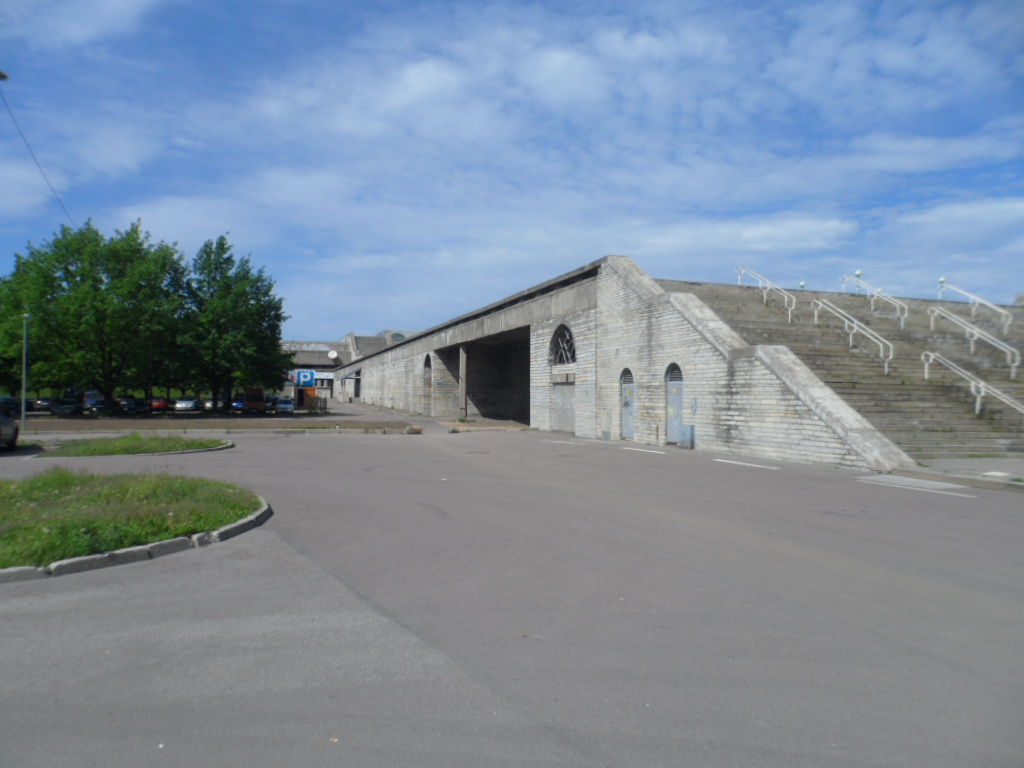
- Interactive map of Linnahalli Jäähall
- Location: Kalamaja, Tallinn, Estonia
- Owner: Tallinn
- Capacity: 3,000

Construction
- Opened: 1981
- Closed: 2009
- Architects: Riina Altmäe, Raine Karp

== Heliport ==
Linnahall Heliport
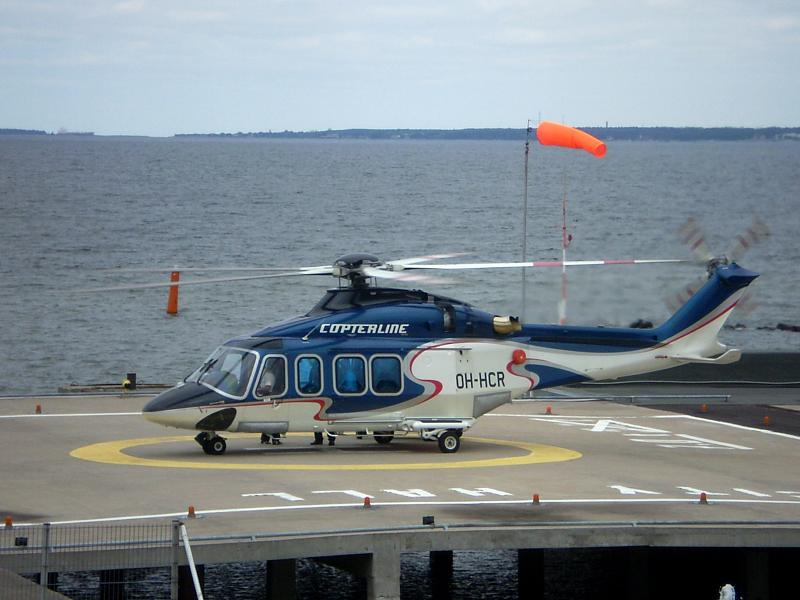
- IATA: none; ICAO: EECL

Summary
- Airport type: Private
- Serves: Tallinn
- Location: Tallinn, Estonia
- Elevation AMSL: 17 ft (5.2 m)
- Coordinates: 59°26′53″N 024°45′12″E

Map
- Location in Estonia

Helipads
Number	Length		Surface
Number	m	ft	Surface
1	8	26	Concrete
- Sources: Estonian AIP

Linnahall Heliport (ICAO: EECL), is a heliport at the Linnahall in Tallinn, Estonia. It was used by Copterline for its flights to Helsinki Hernesaari Heliport in Helsinki, Finland. It is the only publicly used heliport in Estonia.

In 2005 a helicopter bound for Helsinki from the helipad lost power and fell into the Gulf of Finland. Regular helicopter flights to Helsinki continued until 2012, run by the Finnish company Copterline.

== Noted performers ==
- Savage Garden
- Duran Duran
- Emma Shapplin
- Lou Reed
- Bryan Ferry
- Apocalyptica
- Chris de Burgh
- Scorpions
- Alphaville
- A-ha
- Toto
- Garbage
- Kim Wilde
- The Sugarcubes
- Electric Light Orchestra
- Uriah Heep
- Celine Dion
- Bonnie Tyler
- The Manhattan Transfer
- Jennifer Rush

== Gallery ==
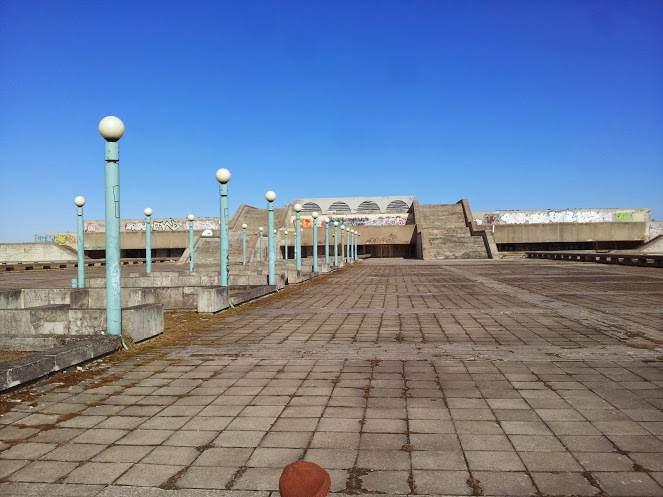
Linnahall from the city

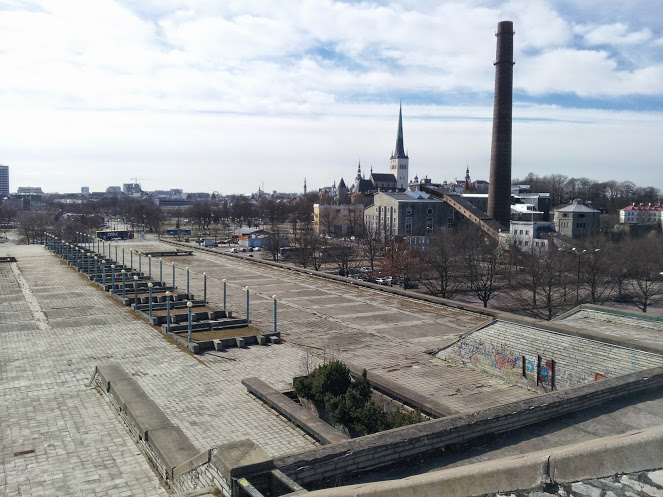
Linnahall looking towards Tallinn

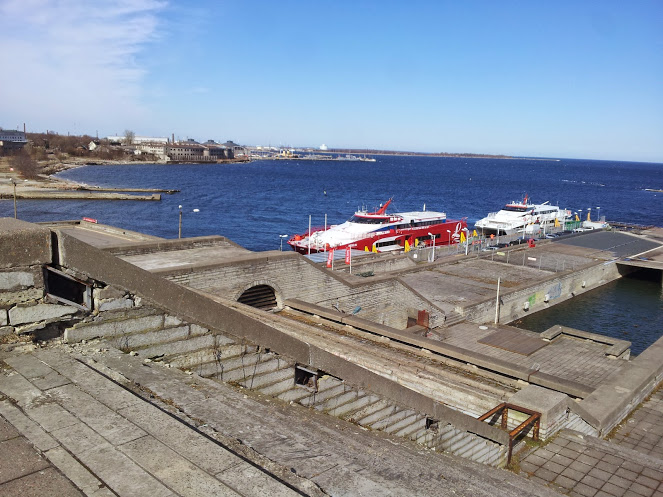
Fast ferries docked at Linnahall

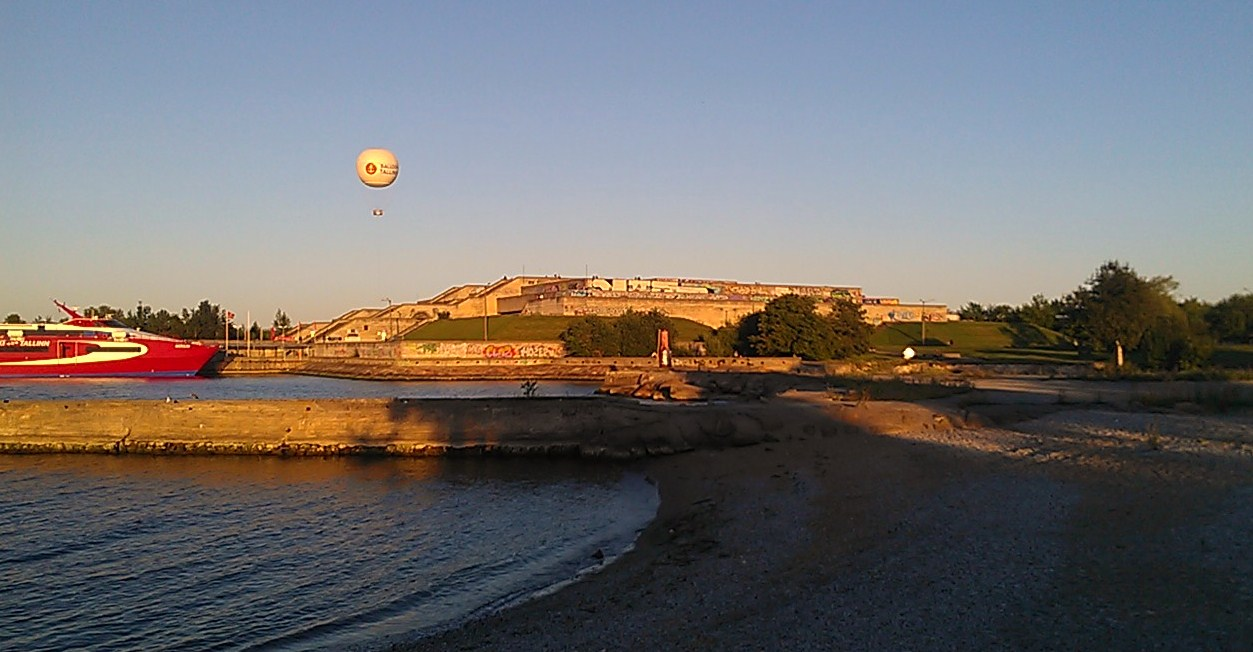
Linnahall viewed from the west
