= Aegna Landscape Conservation Area =

Protected area in Estonia

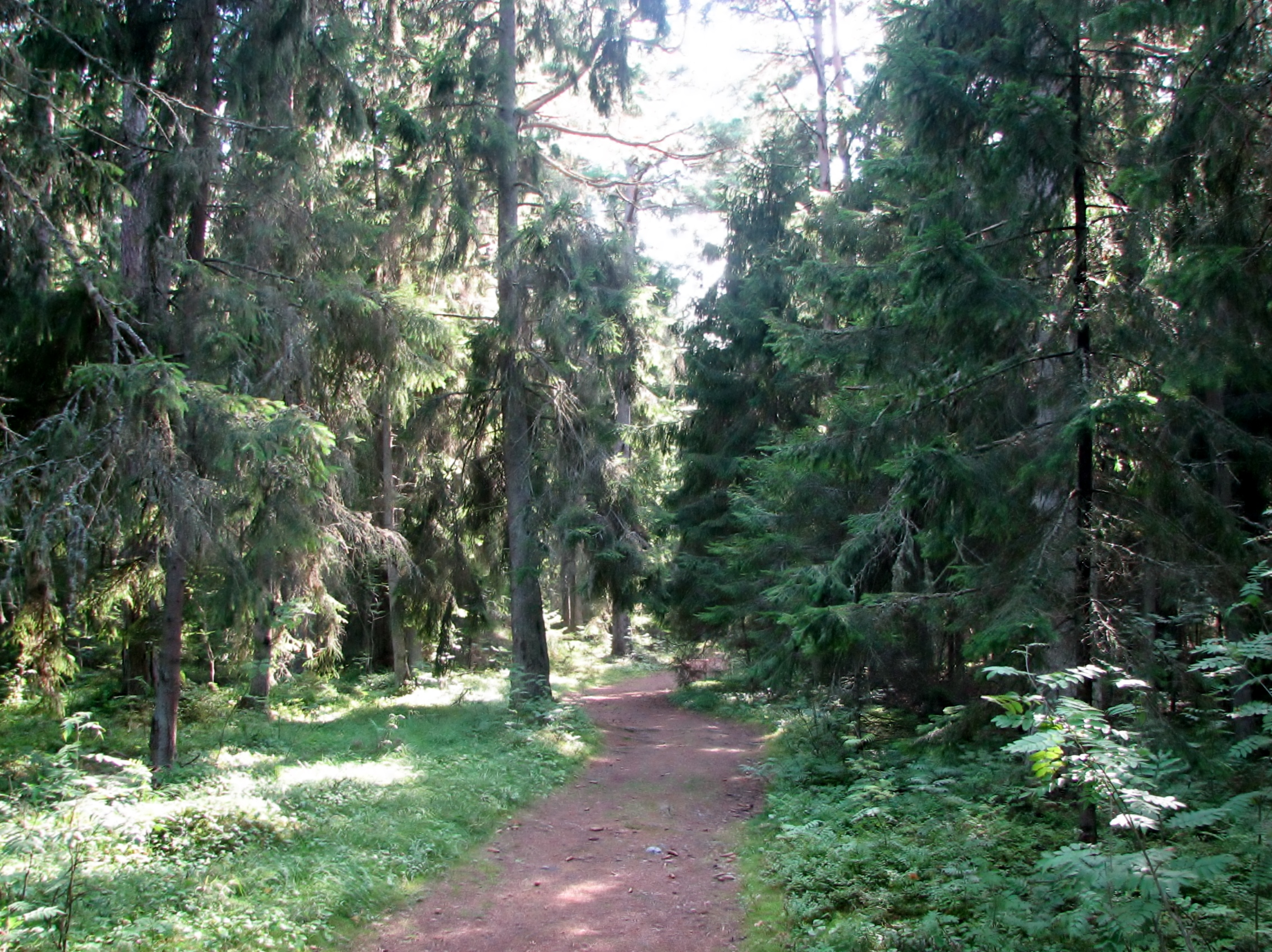

- Location within Estonia
- Location: Estonia
- Nearest city: Tallinn
- Coordinates: 59°34′50″N 24°44′30″E
- Area: 303 ha (750 acres)
- Established: (1991) 2010

Aegna Landscape Conservation Area (Estonian: Aegna maastikukaitseala) is a nature park covering the island of Aegna belonging to the city of Tallinn in Harju County, Estonia.

Its area is 303 ha. The protected area was designated in 1991 to protect Aegna island and its nature. In 2010, the protected area was redesigned to the landscape conservation area.

== Gallery ==
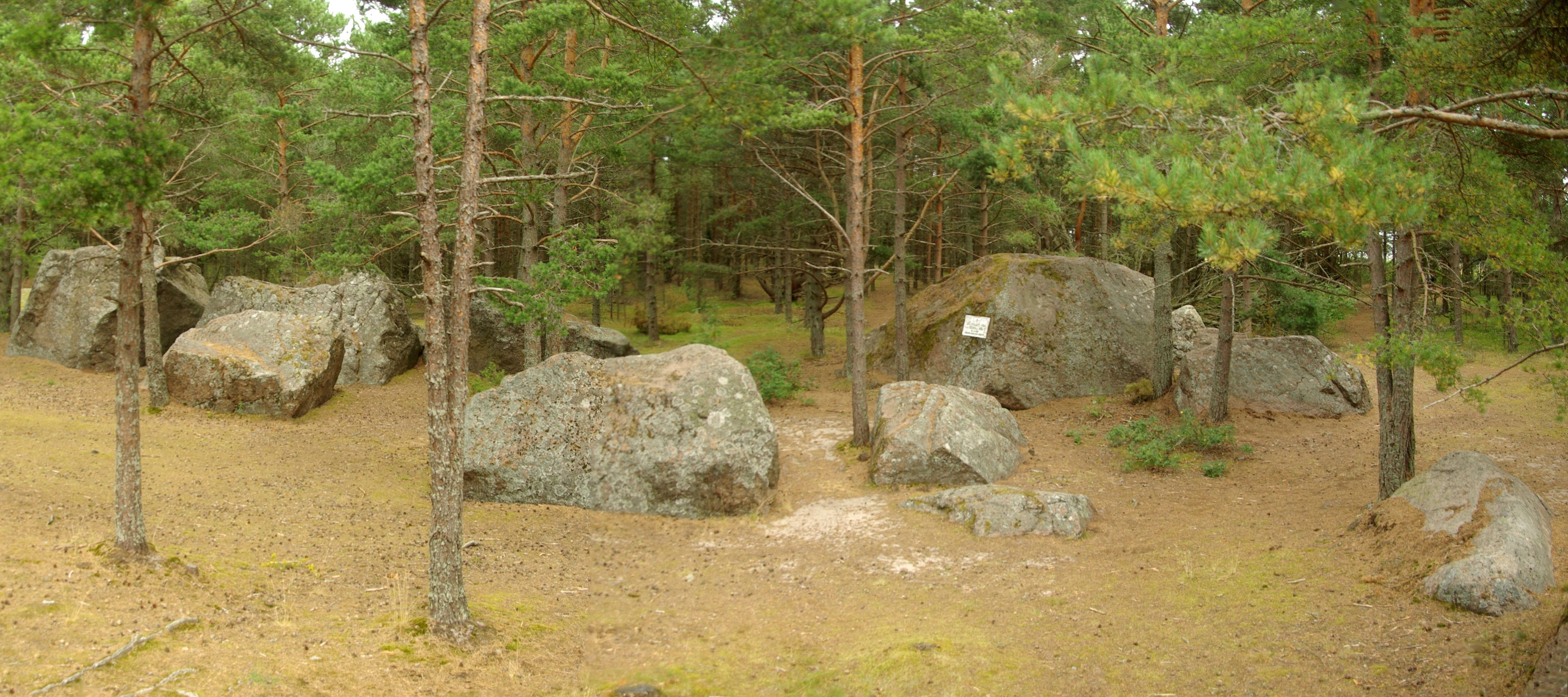
Glacial erratics on Aegna

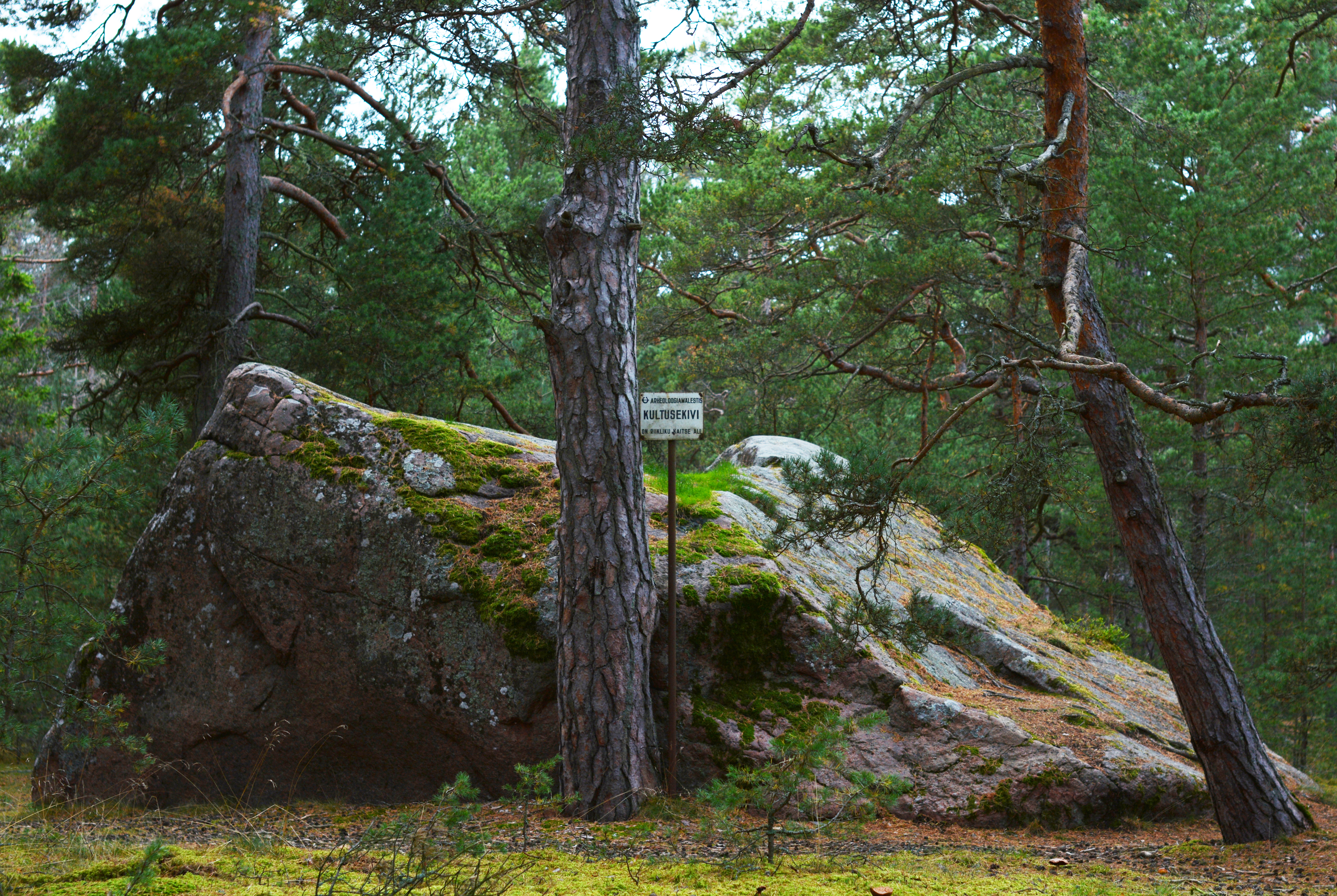
An offering stone

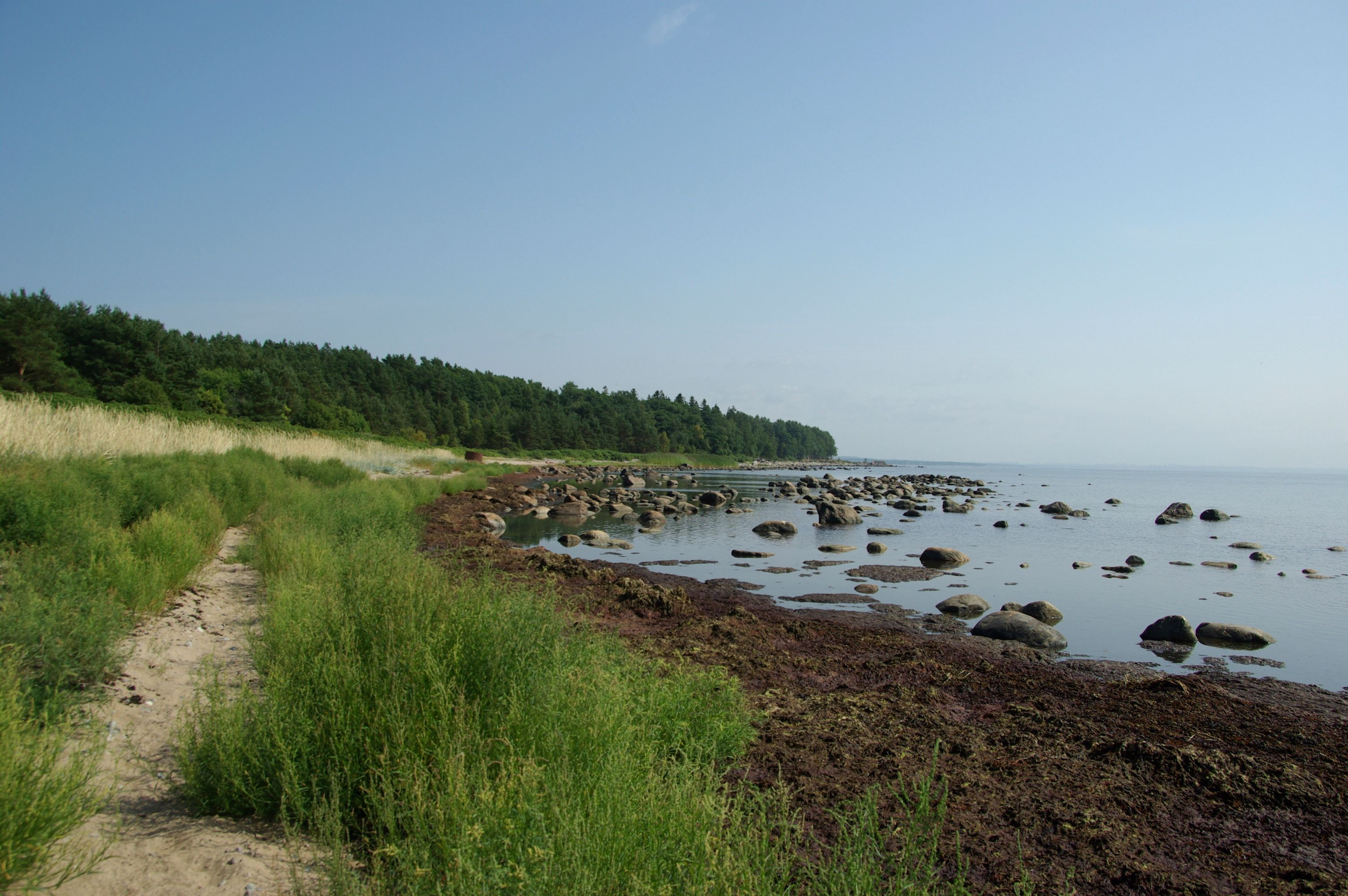
Coastline

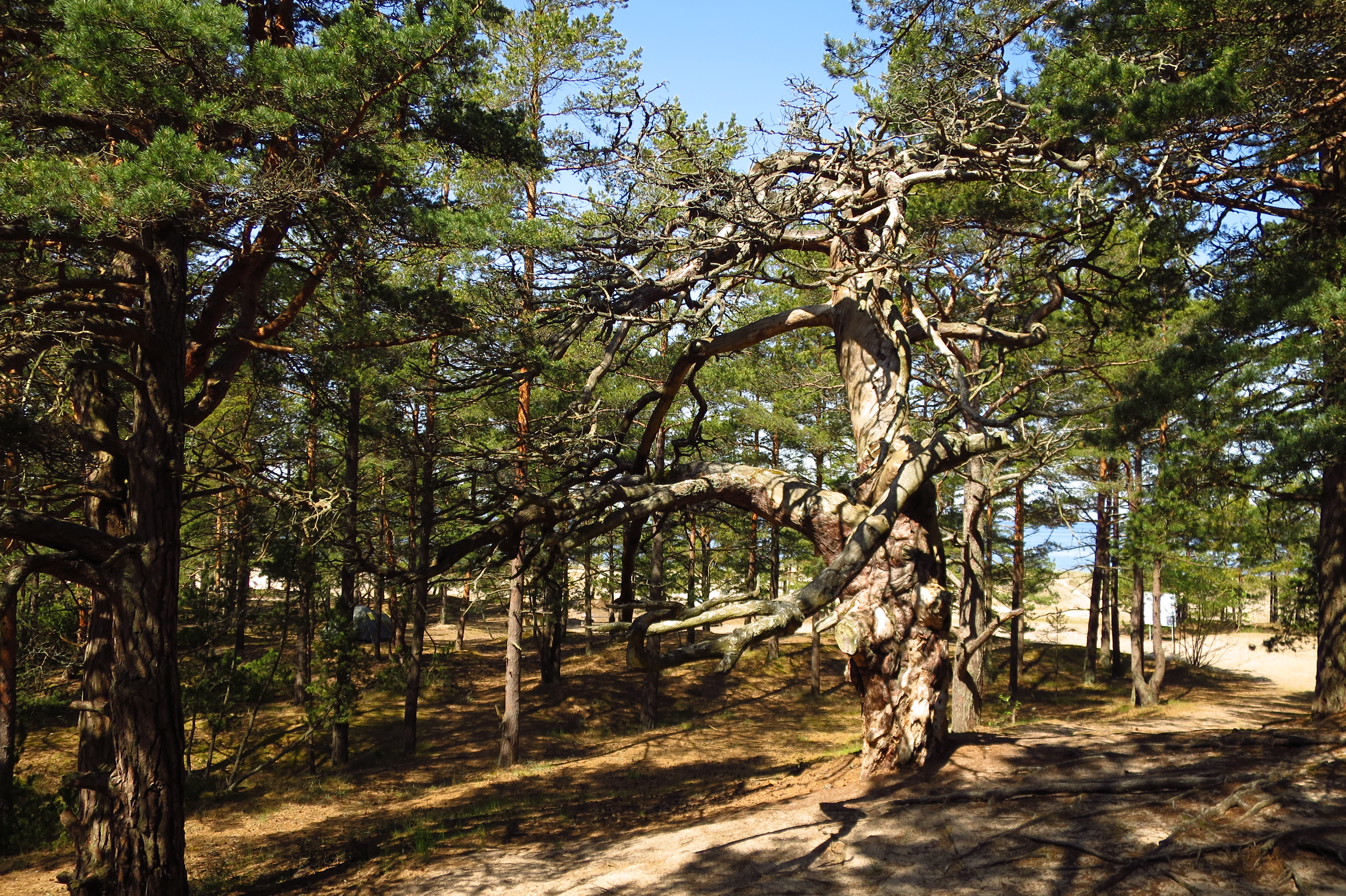
Old pine tree

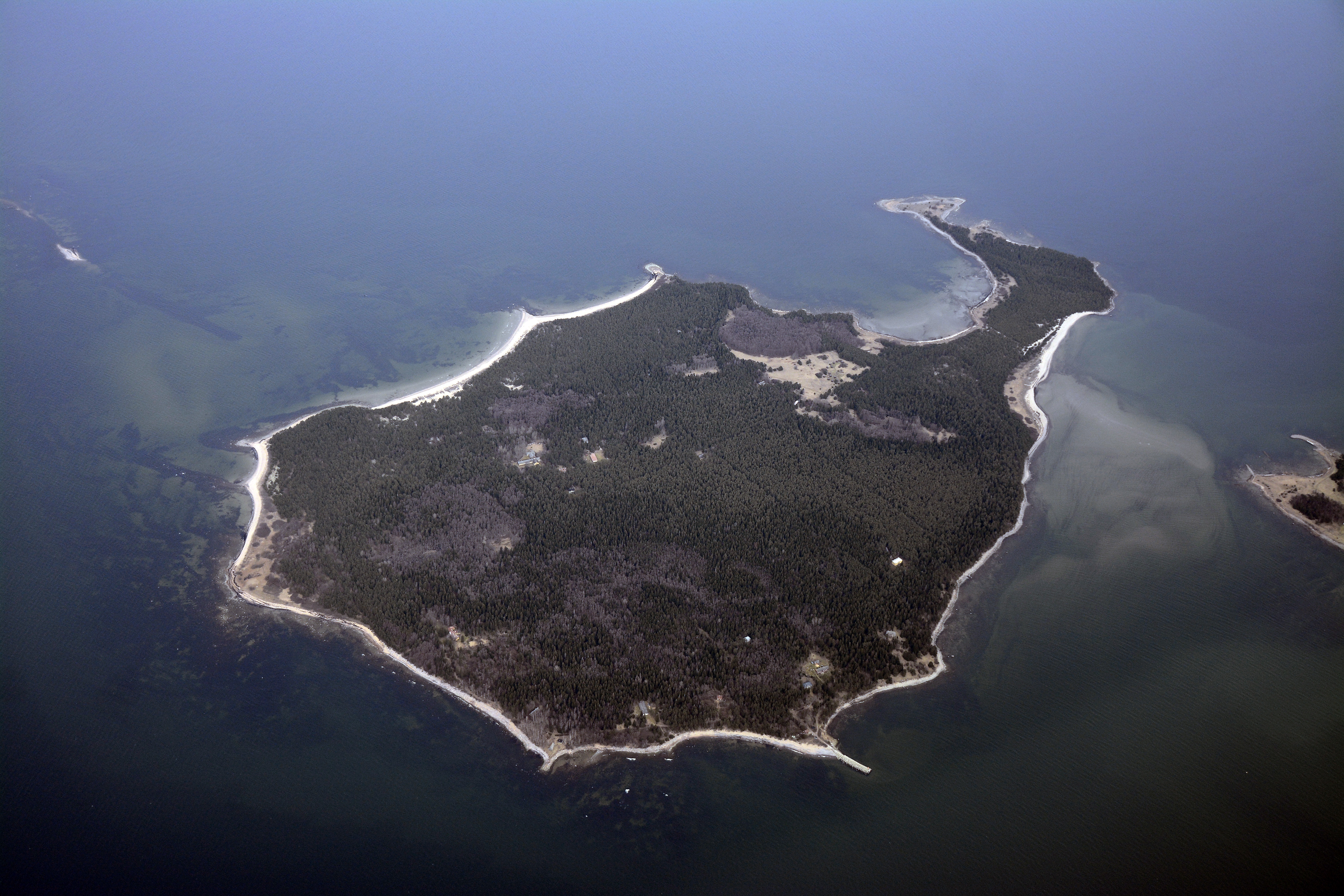
Aerial view of the island

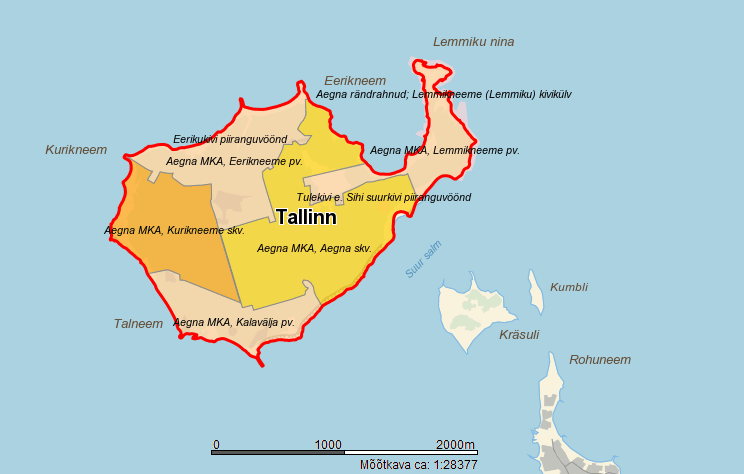
Map of the conservation area
