= List of countries by number of heliports =

Helicopters are a type of rotorcraft, which are capable of vertical take off and landing. They are fitted with one or more rotors, which enable them to hover, and to move forward or backwards and laterally. Helicopters can operate from smaller space compared to fixed-wing aircraft which often require a runway. They often use helipads as landing areas, which can be part of airports and heliports, or can be located in isolated places. A helicopter deck can be part of large ships, and oil rigs, while helipads can sometimes located atop large skyscrapers.

== List by country ==
Country	Helipads (Note: Includes heliports, helipads, and landing areas that support helicopter operations)	Helicopters		Notes
Country	Helipads	Civilian	Military	Notes
World		38,536	31,192	
Afghanistan	8	4	18	
Albania	1		22	
Algeria	9	41	278	
Angola	2		105	
Andorra	3			Andorra Heliport
Antarctica	53			
Argentina	148	319	96	
Armenia	2	3	41	
Asia-Pacific	5,533	4,167	5,005	
Australia	392	2,300	166	
Austria	1	177	66	
Azerbaijan	5	52	85	
Bahamas	1			
Bahrain	11		62	
Bangladesh	300	36	54	
Belarus	1		57	
Belgium	108	162	53	
Bhutan	1	1		
Bolivia	61	11	30	
Bosnia and Herzegovina	5		20	
Brazil	1,768	1,570	251	
Brunei	14	7	19	
Bulgaria	3		25	
Burma	6			
Burundi	1			
Cambodia	1	9	16	
Canada	481	2,955	149	
Chad	1		19	
Chile	45	257	84	
China	1,721	2,800	2,200	
Colombia	2	217	241	
DRC	15		27	
Croatia	1	15	31	
Cyprus	9			
Czech Republic	1	233	57	
Denmark	29	119	32	
Djibouti	6			
Dominican Republic	8			
Ecuador	2		48	
Egypt	6	40	368	
El Salvador	1			
Eritrea	1			
Estonia	1			
Ethiopia	4		33	
European Union	2,069	9,000	4,487	
Faroe Islands	12			
Fiji	2	9		
Finland	17	100	27	
France	545	3,537	610	
French Polynesia	1			
Gabon	6		16	
Gaza Strip	1			
Georgia	4	30	41	
Germany	449	890	361	
Ghana	7			
Greece	59	108	224	
Greenland	54			
Guam	2			
Guatemala	2	10	19	
Guernsey	1			
Guinea	1			
Honduras	6			
Hong Kong	170	30		
Hungary	15	133		
Iceland	3	10	3	
India	1,071	250	710	
Indonesia	64	179	152	
Iran	90	80	128	
Iraq	21	43	159	
Ireland	10	34		
Israel	13	61	143	
Italy	229	2,300	415	1,140 Ultralight Helicopters
Jamaica	2			
Japan	3,036	806	599	
Jordan	15	6	126	
Kazakhstan	32		69	
North Korea	22		202	
South Korea	1,280	192	683	
Kenya	21	88	62	
Kosovo	11			
Kuwait	20	2	42	
Kyrgyzstan	1			
Laos	4	6		
Latvia	5			
Lebanon	27		48	
Liechtenstein	2			
Libya	2		27	
Lithuania	2			
Luxembourg	11	12		
Macau	2	30		
Malaysia	3	180	79	
Mexico	545	586	189	
Monaco	1			Monaco Heliport
Mongolia	1	6		
Montenegro	1			
Morocco	17	184	126	
Myanmar	5	13	87	
Namibia	1	30	9	
Nepal	43	28	18	
Netherlands	194	74	274	Heliport in Nederland
New Caledonia	8			
New Zealand	2,577	919	24	
Nicaragua	1		17	
Nigeria	250	115	38	
Northern Mariana Islands	7			
Norway	116	263	34	Heliports of Norway
Oman	20	2	45	
Pakistan	178	200	522	
Panama	3			
Papua New Guinea	3	102		
Paraguay	29	8		
Peru	7	107	83	
Philippines	416	180	91	
Poland	16	192	210	
Portugal	65	81	27	
Puerto Rico	40			
Qatar	31	46	45	
Romania	3		86	
Russia	6,272	2,500	2,600	
Rwanda	1	4		
El Salvador	6		30	
Saudi Arabia	300	111	204	
Serbia	11		40	
Sierra Leone	2			
Singapore	1	3	71	
Slovakia	1		16	
Slovenia	5	33		
Solomon Islands	3			
South Africa	50	1,262	96	577 Piston helicopters
Spain	458	530	159	
Spratly Islands	3			
Sri Lanka	23	12	45	
Sudan	8		64	
Suriname	1	16	3	
Svalbard	1			
Sweden	11	250	46	
Switzerland	52	345	43	
Syria	13		168	
Taiwan	30	41	307	
Tajikistan	1		20	
Thailand	168	115	282	
Timor-Leste	8			
Tunisia	11		76	
Turkey	213	110	445	Turkish Heliports
Turkmenistan	25			
Uganda	6		22	
Ukraine	42	194	92	
United Arab Emirates	1,100	109	250	
United Kingdom	170	1,062	348	1,283 helis registered
United States	13,097	14,973	6,131	6,154 heliports & 6,943 helipads
Uzbekistan	3		69	
Venezuela	88	351	86	
Vietnam	25	28	150	
Yemen	6		62	
Zimbabwe	5		29	
