= Vertiport =

Take-off and landing space for drones

A vertiport (verti- is for vertical and port for harbour, analogous to airport) is a future, as yet rarely realised concept of a take-off and landing site for electrically powered aircraft taking off and landing vertically, eVTOL craft. It can be part of a vertihub if there is a large volume of air traffic. A vertiport is similar to a heliport or helipad.

== Proposed types ==
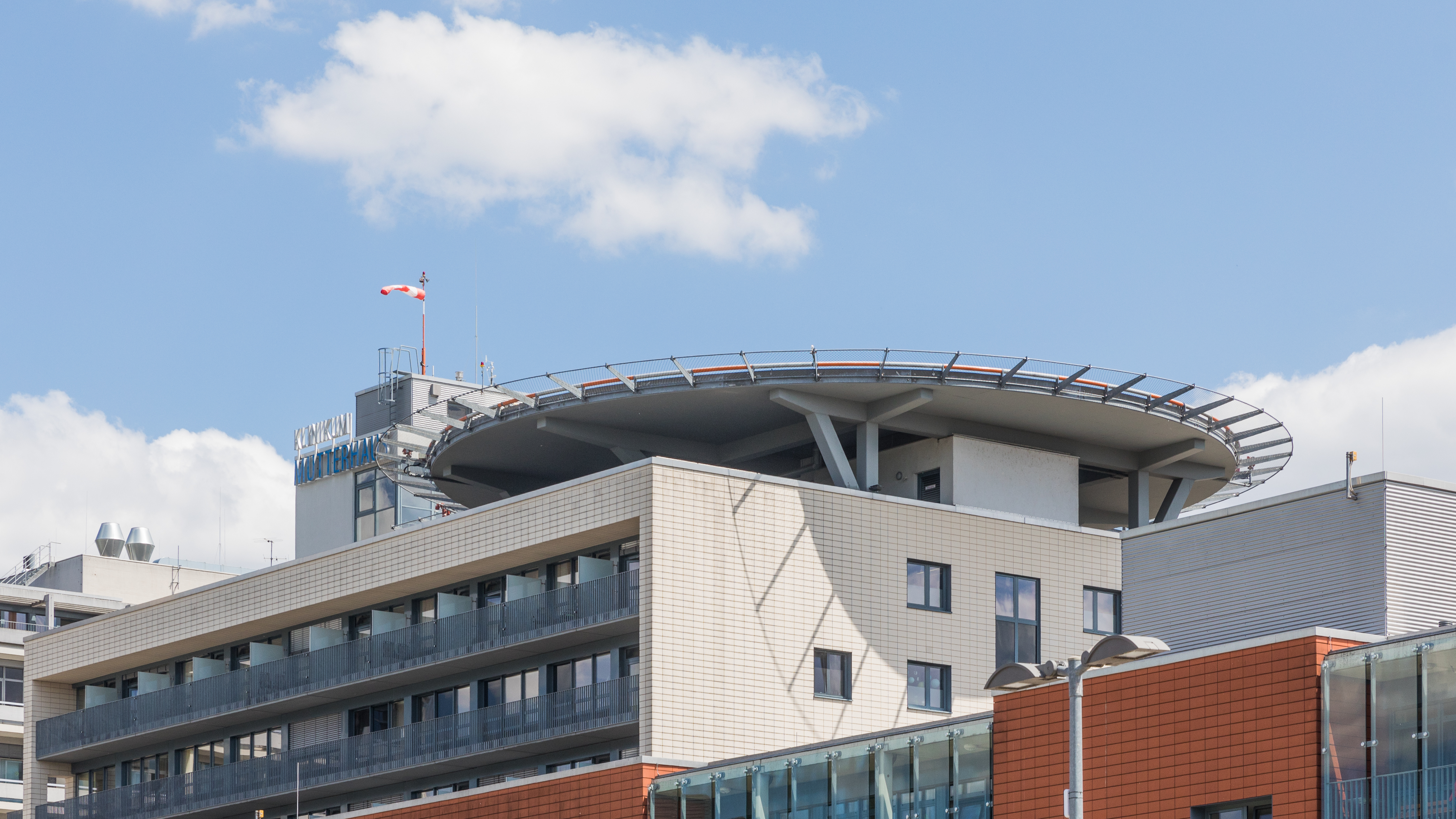
A helipad on a hospital, analogous to a possible vertiport

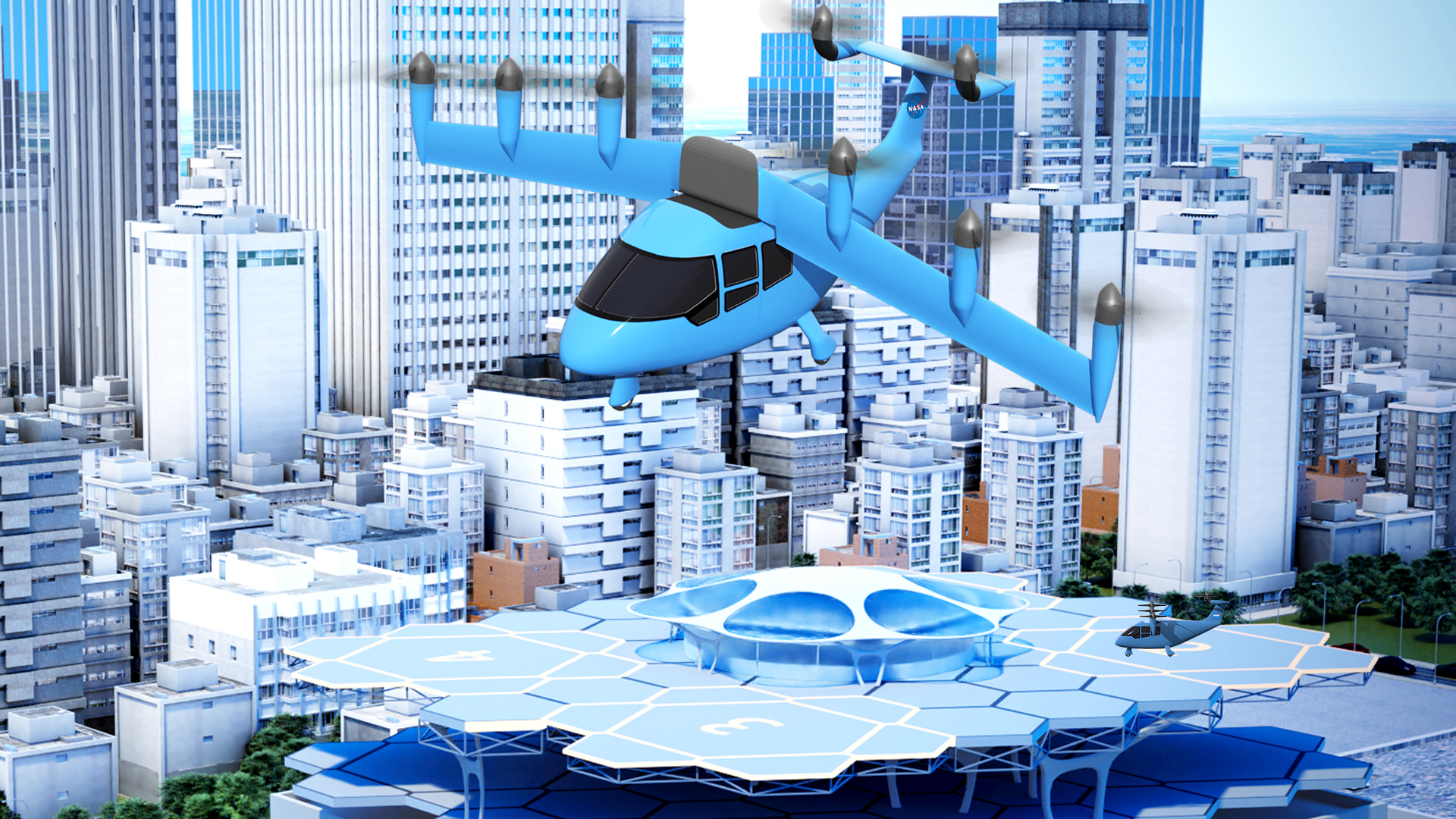
A concept image of a vehicle landing at a vertiport

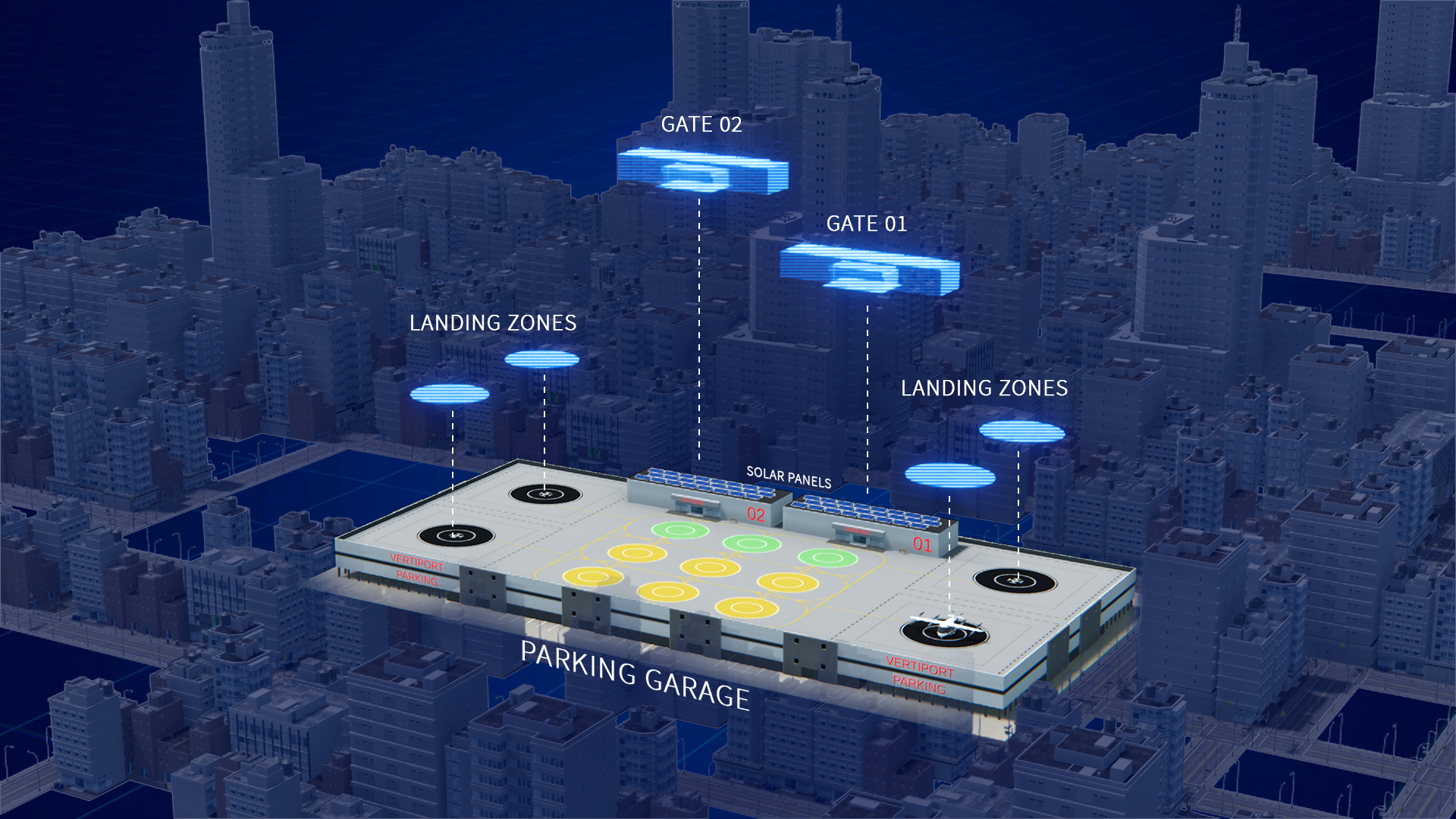
A concept schematic representation of a vertiport

=== Vertihub ===
A vertihub is the largest unit of the eVTOL starting and landing infrastructure with multiple take-off and landing bays and additional bays for parking and maintenance. It is a take-off and landing site for a large number of eVTOLs. It comprises at least two vertiports or vertipads and serves as the largest structure in the UAM environment. Vertihubs are intended for densely populated regions with high traffic volumes. The name is derived from vertical and hub, which stands for airline hub.

=== Vertibase ===
Vertibases are of medium size. They are located in suburbs with medium traffic volumes or at important work or retail locations. Typically, they have around three take-off and landing bays and twice as many parking and maintenance bays.

=== Vertistation ===
Vertistations are mobile and modular vertistation mobility hubs.

=== Vertipad ===
Vertipads are the smallest unit. In city centres they fit well, e.g. on top of existing buildings.

== History ==
As there are currently only prototypes and no authorised series models of eVTOLs, all vertiports to date are only short-term, temporary projects. There has been a traditional rotary vertiport in Chicago, USA, since 2015. From 2026, eVTOLs are also planned to take off and land there.

The first vertiport prototype for eVTOLs in Singapore was created by Volocopter and Skyports as part of the ITS World Congress 2019 and exhibited for a few days at The Float at Marina Bay. The architecture is by Berlin-based innovation agency Brandlab.

== See also ==
- Heliport
- Air transport
