= Eerikukivi =

Glacial erratic boulder in Estonia

- Glacial erratic
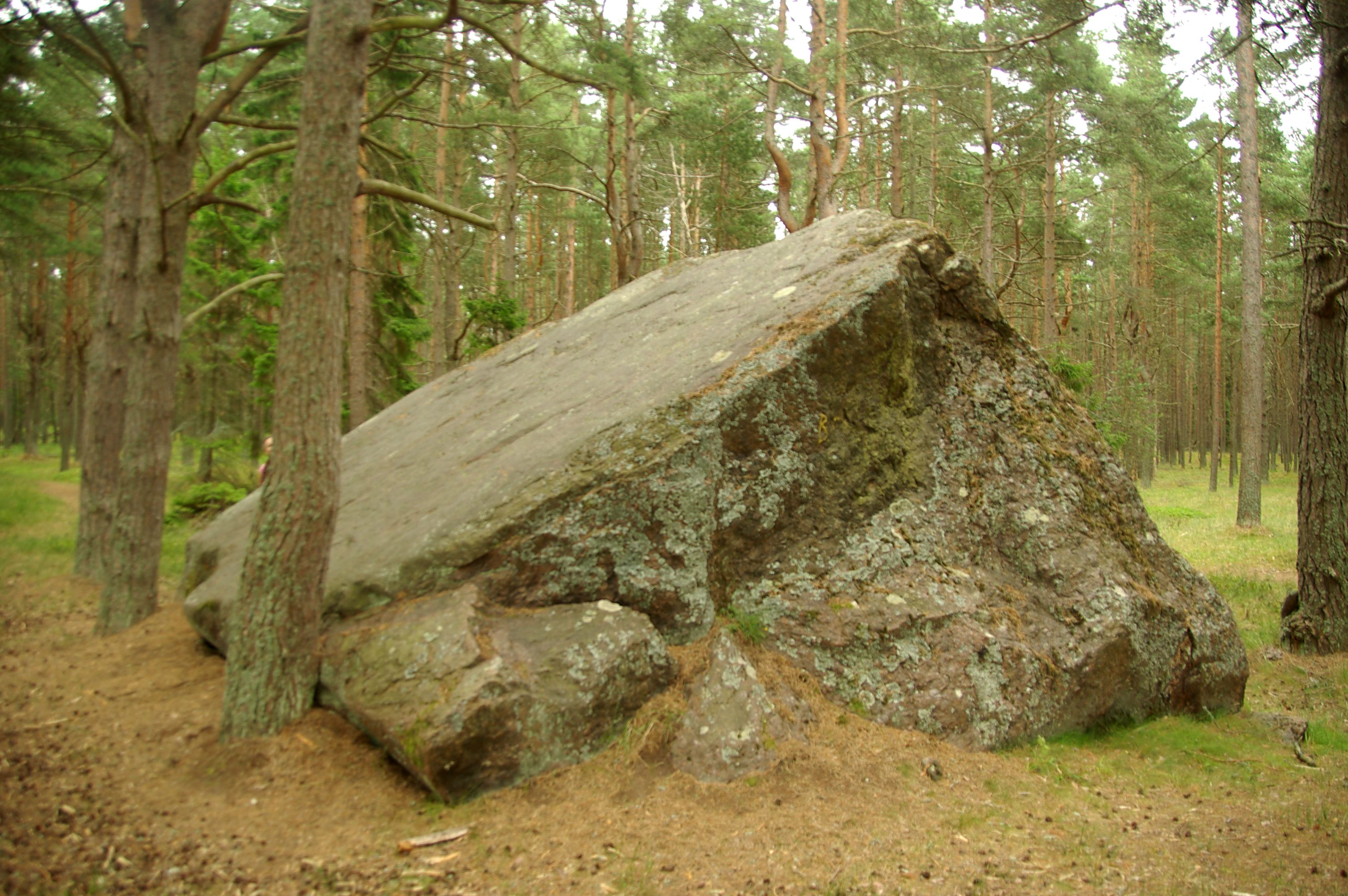

- Location within Estonia
- Coordinates: 59°35′10″N 24°45′14″E
- Location: island of Aegna
- Geology: glacial erratic

Eerikukivi is a glacial erratic on the island of Aegna. Its coordinates are: 59°35′10″N 24°45′14″E.

== Conservation ==
On 1 January 1992, the boulder was declared a Protected Natural Monument by the Estonian government. It is classed as Category III within the IUCN Management Category. The Class III designation is reserved for natural monuments that are "protected areas managed mainly for conservation of specific natural features". Or, "areas containing one, or more, specific natural or natural/cultural features which is of outstanding or unique value because of its inherent rarity, representative or aesthetic qualities or cultural significance."
