= Hernesaari Heliport =

Hernesaari Heliport Hernesaaren helikopterikenttä Ärtholmens heliport
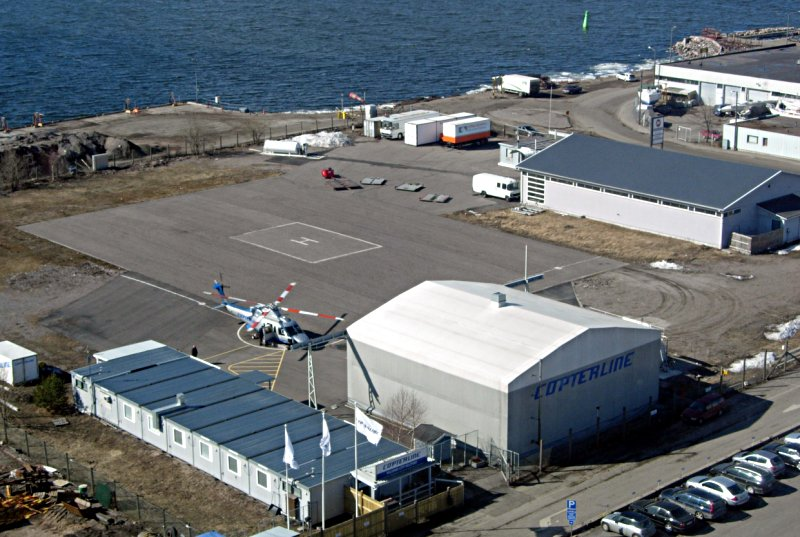
- Hernesaari Heliport from the air
- IATA: HEN; ICAO: EFHE

Summary
- Airport type: Private
- Operator: Helikopterikeskus Oy
- Serves: Helsinki
- Location: Hernesaari, Helsinki, Finland
- Elevation AMSL: 2 m (6.6 ft)
- Coordinates: 60°08′52″N 024°55′27″E

Map
- Location within Finland

Helipads
Number	Length		Surface
Number	m	ft	Surface
–	40	131	Asphalt
- Source: AIP Finland

Hernesaari Heliport (Finnish: Hernesaaren helikopterikenttä, Swedish: Ärtholmens heliport, IATA: HEN, ICAO: EFHE) is located at Hernesaari, in Helsinki, Finland. The heliport is run by Helikopterikeskus.

The Heliport that used to be in Hernesaari has been closed.

The Hernesaari area is in constant development. The city development board agreed on a draft for the amendment of the town plan in December 2009.

As of August 2011, FastClass company plans to restart the operations.

== Commercial traffic ==
Helicopter operator Copterline used the heliport for commercial flights to Tallinn. Operations began in September 2011, with seven departures daily. The helicopter used on the route was owned and maintained by the Finnish company FastClass, while flight operations were conducted by the Estonian company Copterline OÜ.

Copterline had also used the heliport earlier in the 2000s, but following the 2005 accident, the company encountered financial difficulties and was declared bankrupt in 2010.

A new heliport was planned for Hernesaari on reclaimed land. The City Planning Committee approved a draft partial master plan including the new heliport in December 2009. However, in 2013, the majority of the City Board removed the heliport from the partial master plan. The environmental permit remained valid until 2020.

== See also ==
- List of the largest airports in the Nordic countries
