= Rohuneeme =

Village in Estonia

- Village
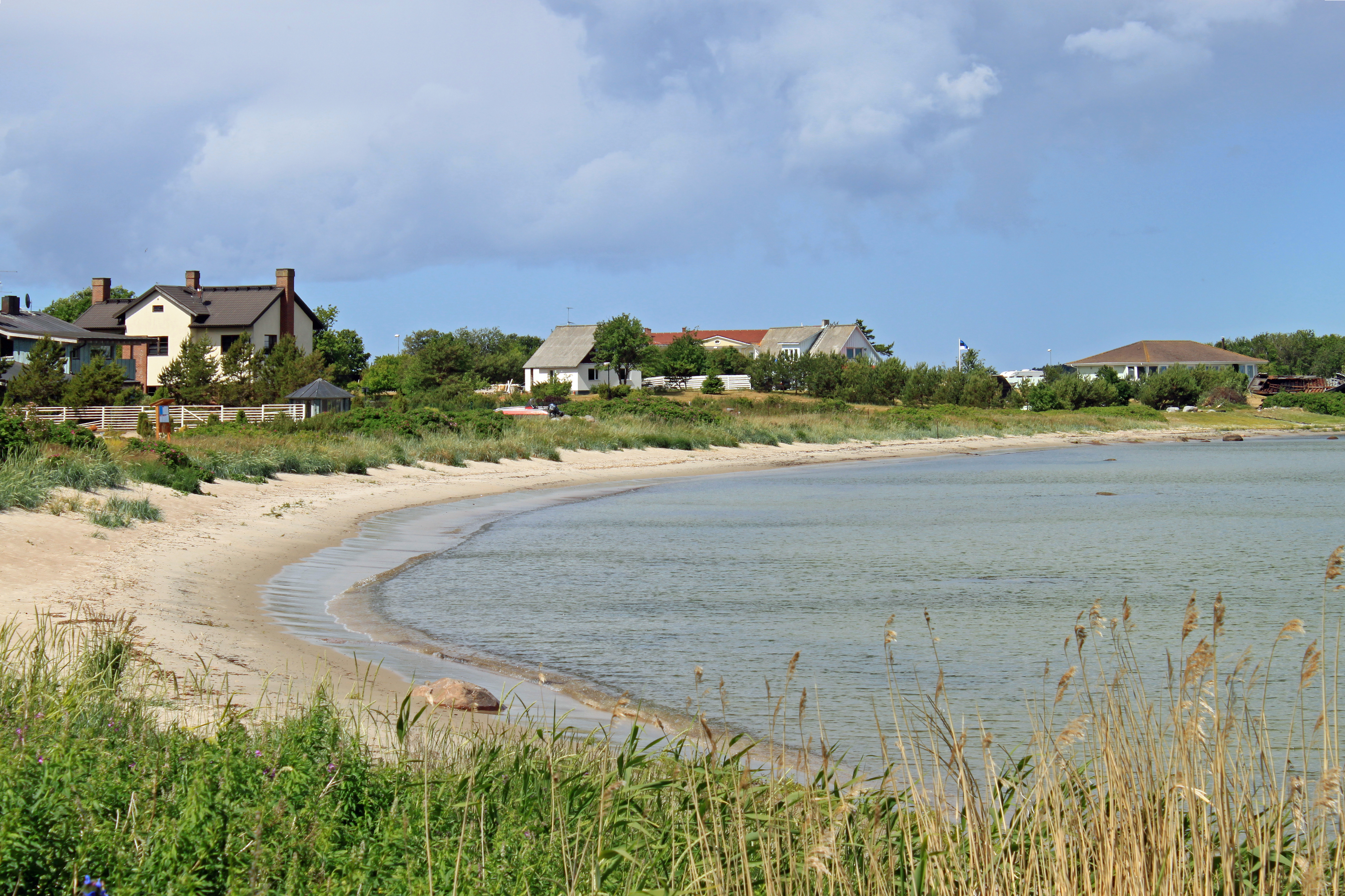

- Location in Estonia
- Coordinates: 59°33′42″N 24°48′01″E
- Country: Estonia
- County: Harju County
- Municipality: Viimsi Parish
- First mentioned: 1375

Population (2011 Census)
  - Total: 440
- Website: www.rohuneeme.ee

Rohuneeme is a village in Viimsi Parish, Harju County in northern Estonia. It is located about 14 km (9 mi) northeast of the centre of Tallinn, situated on the northern end of the Viimsi Peninsula. As of the 2011 census, the settlement's population was 440.

The northernmost cape of the peninsula is named Rohuneem (literally: 'grass cape').

The island of Aegna, which administratively belongs to Tallinn, is located about 1.5 km northwest of Rohuneeme. There are also two small islets Kräsuli and Kumbli located in the straits between, which belong to Rohuneeme.

Rohuneeme was first mentioned in 1375 as oppidum Longenes. The narrow strait between Kräsuli and Aegna was known as Wulfs Sund. It has been known as a point for pirates to ambush the Novgorodian merchant ships which brought valuable goods to Tallinn. According to one hypothesis, the strait could have been the location of the battle at Iron Gate in 1032, mentioned in Russian chronicles. In battle, which though is usually located to northern Russia, Novgorodians led by Ulf Ragvaldsson suffered heavy loss.

In the Middle Ages Rohuneeme was settled by Coastal Swedes. During the Soviet times a missile base was located on the southern side of the village.

There is a harbour, store and a cemetery with chapel located in the village.

The second president of Estonia, Lennart Meri, lived on the cape of Rohuneeme.
