= Copterline =

Finnish airline

Coordinates: 60°08′52″N 024°55′28″E

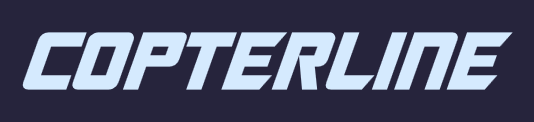

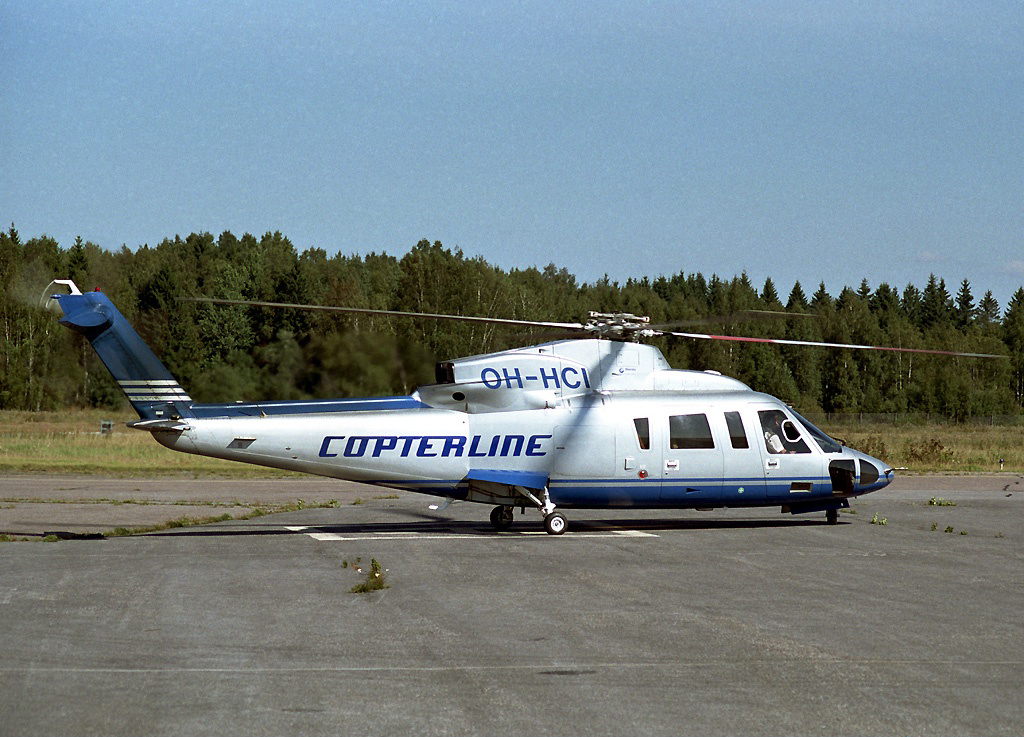
- Sikorsky S-76C+
IATA	ICAO	Call sign
–	AAQ	COPTERLINE
- Founded: 1990
- Ceased operations: March 2016
- Hubs: Hernesaari Heliport
- Fleet size: 9
- Destinations: 2
- Headquarters: Helsinki, Finland

Copterline Oy was Finland's largest helicopter airline established on 15 October 1990 as Copter Action and renamed later on. The headquarters were located at Helsinki-Malmi Airport in Helsinki.

In 2004 the company ferried over 75,000 passengers. On December 19, 2008, Copterline confirmed that it had ceased its scheduled service between Helsinki and Tallinn. On 15 February 2010, Copterline filed for bankruptcy, citing inability to keep the company profitable. In 2011, Line Support Oy, mostly founded by the same group as Copterline Oy, announced a resumption of service from September, operated by its Estonian subsidiary Copterline OÜ. On 9 September 2011, the first commercial flights were undertaken.

== History ==
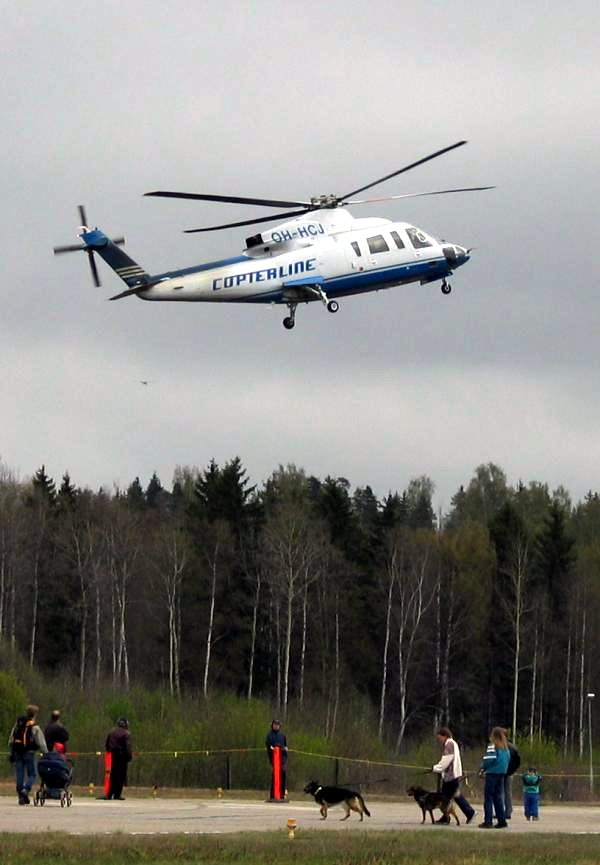
Sikorsky S-76C+ helicopter taking off from Helsinki-Malmi airport

Copterline acquired Helikopteripalvelu in 1999, the oldest Finnish company in the business, and began offering services in 2000.

Copterline used to maintain hourly passenger flights across the Gulf of Finland between Helsinki, Finland (Helsinki Hernesaari Heliport) and Tallinn, Estonia (Tallinn Linnahall Heliport) between 07:00–20:00 (14 round trips), 9:00–17:00 on Saturdays (9 round trips) and 10:00–16:00 on Sundays (7 round trips). The trip took 18 minutes, and the helicopters could carry 12 passengers on each flight.

In spring 2004, the company was restricted from commercial flights in bad weather conditions, due to concerns about pilot qualifications, but the restriction was later lifted. On 10 August 2005, Copterline Flight 103 crashed while flying between Tallinn and Helsinki, three kilometers south of Aegna island. All 14 people on board died. After that tragic accident, the company closed the route. In August 2006, Copterline sold its last remaining Sikorsky S-76 and focused on charter flights resuming the route between Helsinki and Tallinn on April 9, 2008, with a brand new AgustaWestland AW139 helicopter. The company was planning a new terminal in Helsinki. In August 2008, a second AW139 entered into the fleet, and started operating the same route. Kaj Takolander became CEO of the company.

On 19 December 2008, Copterline confirmed that it had ceased its scheduled service between Helsinki and Tallinn and was now looking at the possibility of alternative uses for its helicopters, otherwise, it would sell or lease its aircraft.

As of September 2011 the Copterline website was back in service with a schedule advertising flights up until the Christmas period. The new service was operated by the Estonian company Copterline OÜ with an AgustaWestland AW139 helicopter owned and operated by the Finnish company FirstClass Oy. The 2011 service offered 5 round trips on weekdays with no scheduled weekend service.

The airline was planning to open the route Helsinki-Tallinn again in August 2013, but these plans were postponed and later cancelled. The company went on with helicopter services to the oil and energy sector in the North Sea. In March 2016, Copterline OÜ filed for bankruptcy for the second time.

== Fleet ==
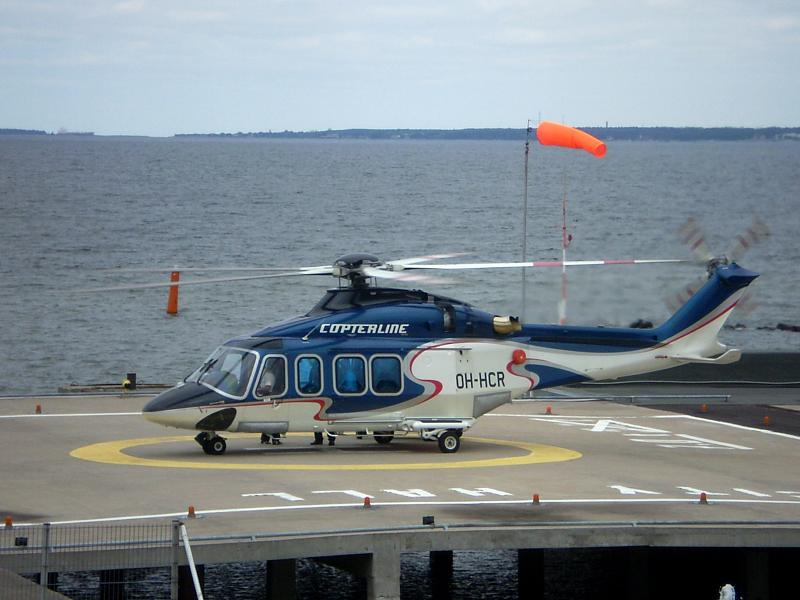
Agusta-Westland AW-139 on a helipad near the Linnahall in Tallinn

Copterline fleet consisted of nine helicopters and several rescue craft. Copterline used four Eurocopter EC 135 helicopters for emergency and medical service operations from three different bases: Oulu, Tampere (formerly Vaasa), and Varkaus.

== Incidents and accidents ==
- On 10 August 2005 Flight 103, a Sikorsky S-76, crashed into the sea near Tallinn, Estonia, three to four minutes after taking off. The craft was carrying 14 people, all of whom were killed: six Finnish, four Estonian and two American passengers, and two Finnish crew members. The disaster was caused by the failure of the flight control system of the American-built helicopter. According to Estonian authorities, no distress signals of any kind were received. However, after examining the helicopter's black box it has been reported that the pilots had attempted sending one, but wasn't received because an air traffic controller in Tallinn Airport was reading back a landing permit. The black box also revealed that the pilots had remained calm and attempted a safe landing in a "by the book" fashion.

The cause of the accident was failure of the power flight control system. Plasma coating on the pistons of the power flight control system had flaked off and blocked the return valve, causing the aircraft to lose its maneuverability. It was revealed in 2007 that the failed component was inside a system that Copterline did not have the authority to service or even open. A periodic leak test that could have revealed the problem was omitted. Furthermore, the emergency floats failed to operate. The manufacturer, Sikorsky, confirmed that damages have been paid to the families of the casualties, but a court case between Copterline and Sikorsky is still pending.
