= Kihnu Strait =

Strait in Estonia

Coordinates: 58°11′N 24°04′E

Kihnu Strait (Estonian: Kihnu väin) is a strait in Estonia, located between Kihnu and Continental Estonia; this strait is part of the Baltic Sea.

The Strait's width is about 12 km.
