= Voosi Strait =

Strait in Estonia

Coordinates: 59°00′N 23°24′E

The Voosi Strait (Estonian: Voosi kurk) is a strait in Estonia located between the island of Vormsi and the Noarootsi Peninsula on the mainland; this strait is part of Väinameri.

Several islets are located in the strait: Nätegrunne, Seasaar, Ulassaar, and Väike-Tjuka.

It is believed that the name Voosi is derived from a former inn called the Voosi Inn (Estonian: Voosi kõrts).
