= Kräsuli =

Island in Estonia

Coordinates: 59°34′N 24°47′E

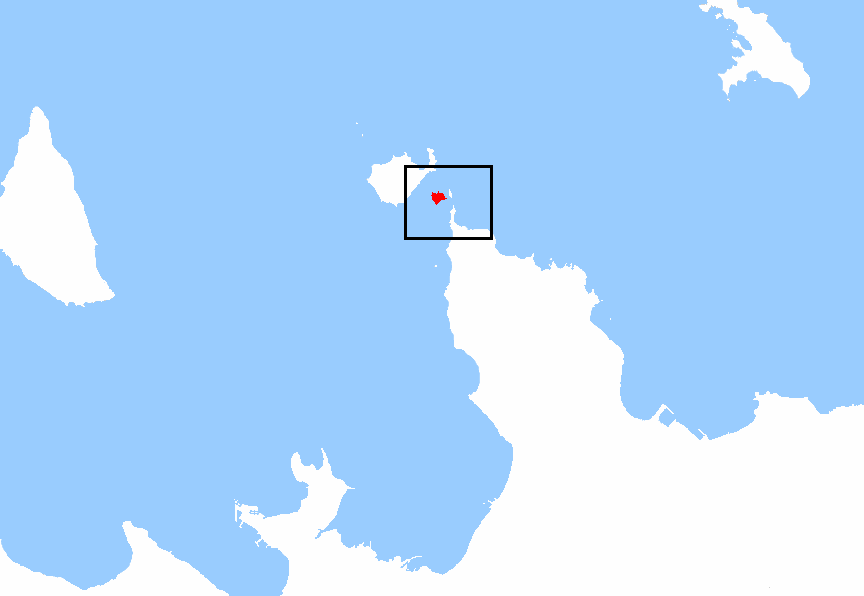
Kräsuli

Kräsuli (Swedish: Gräsören) is an island in the Tallinn Bay, Estonia.

Administratively, it is a part of Rohuneeme village, Viimsi Parish, Harju County.

== Gallery ==
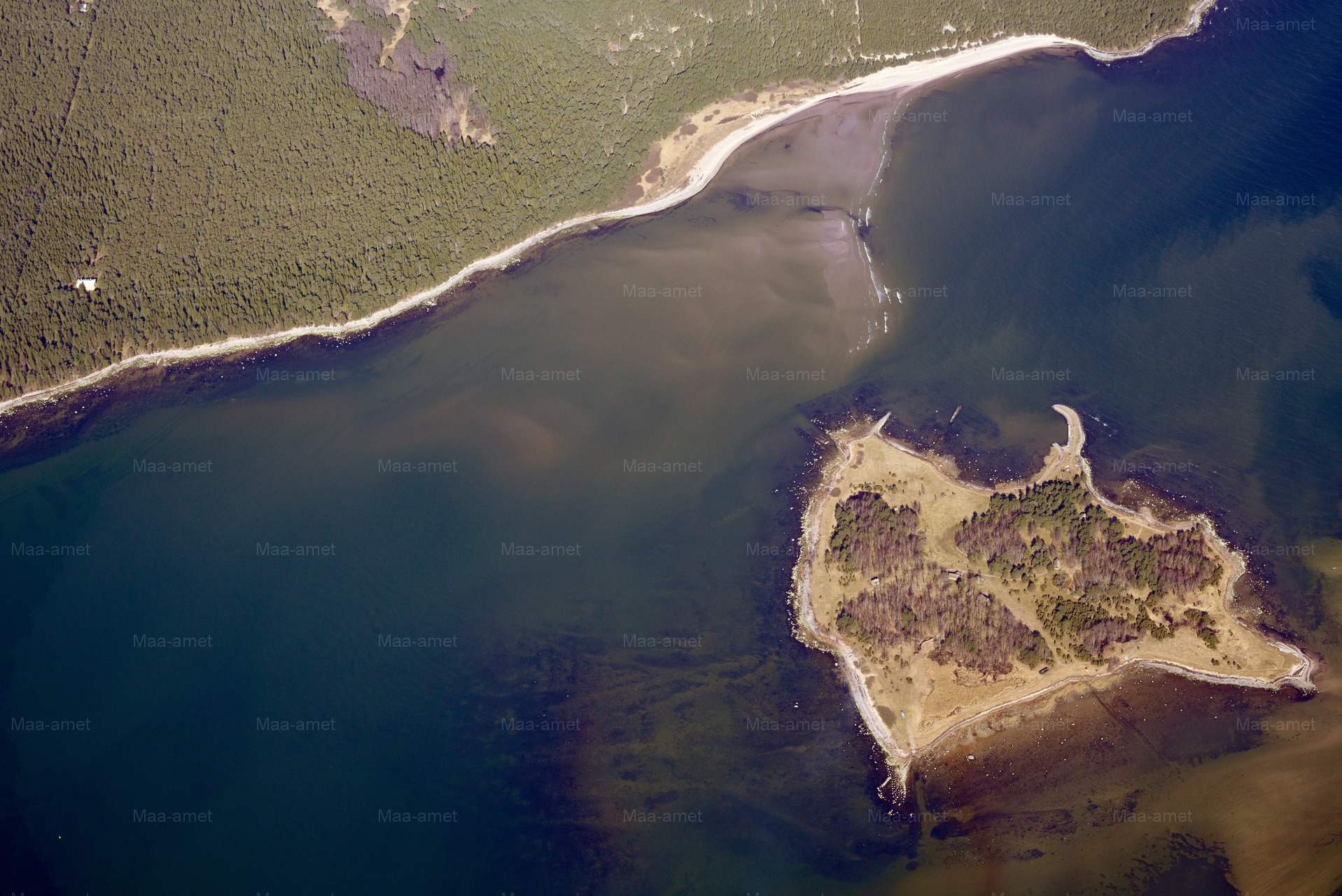

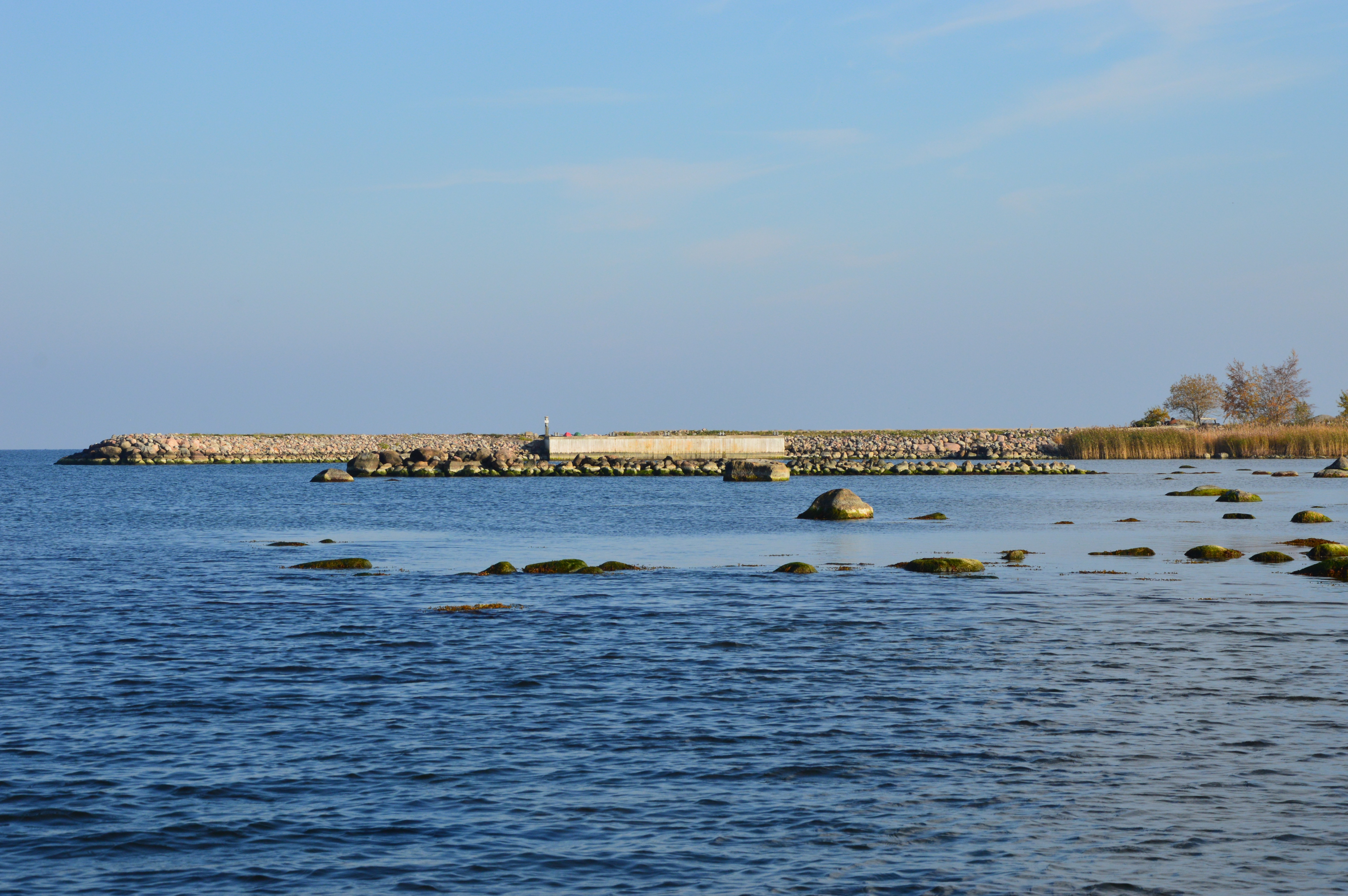

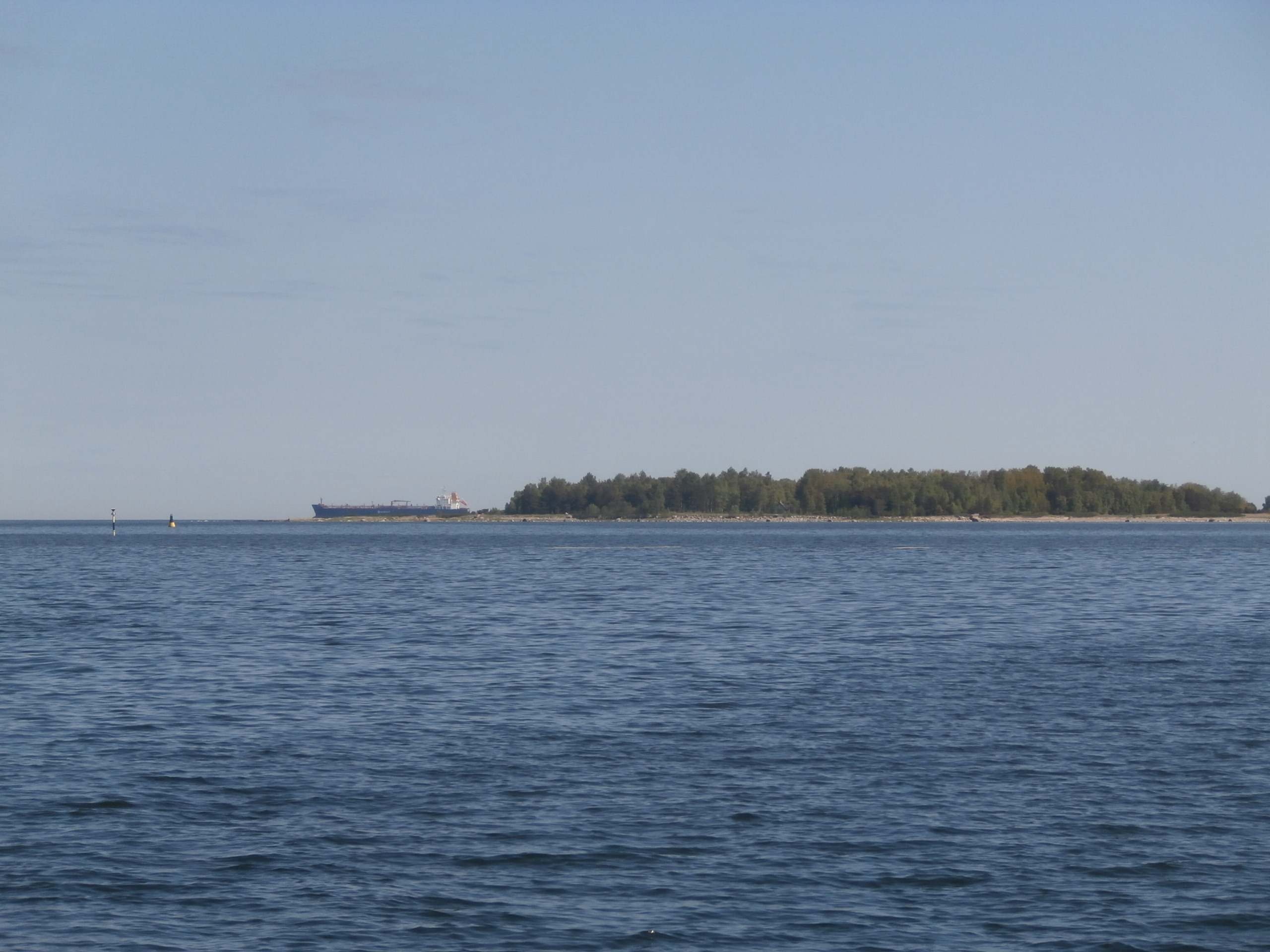

== See also ==
List of islands of Estonia
