= Aegna =

Island in Estonia, and subdistrict of Tallinn, Estonia

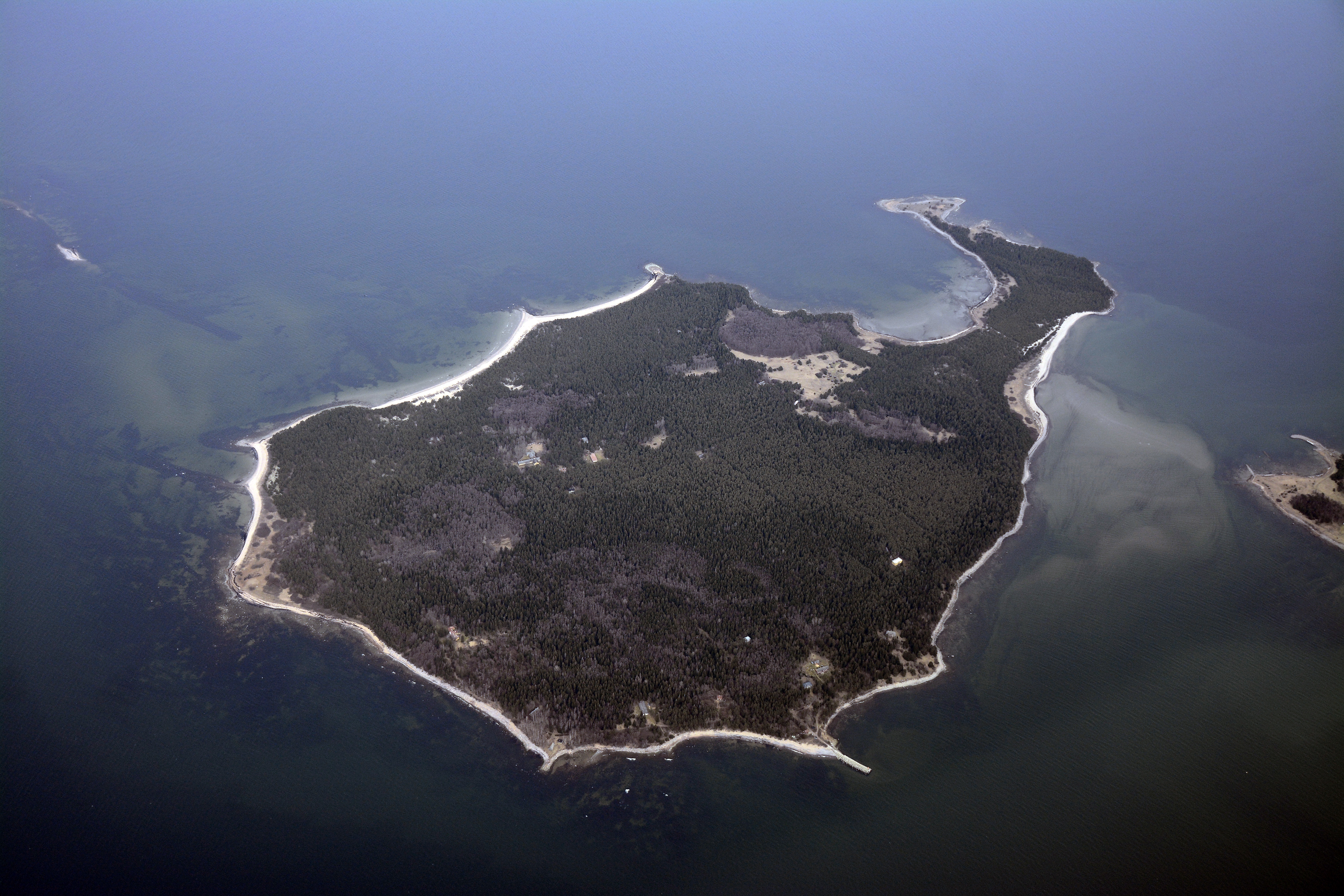
- Aerial view of Aegna

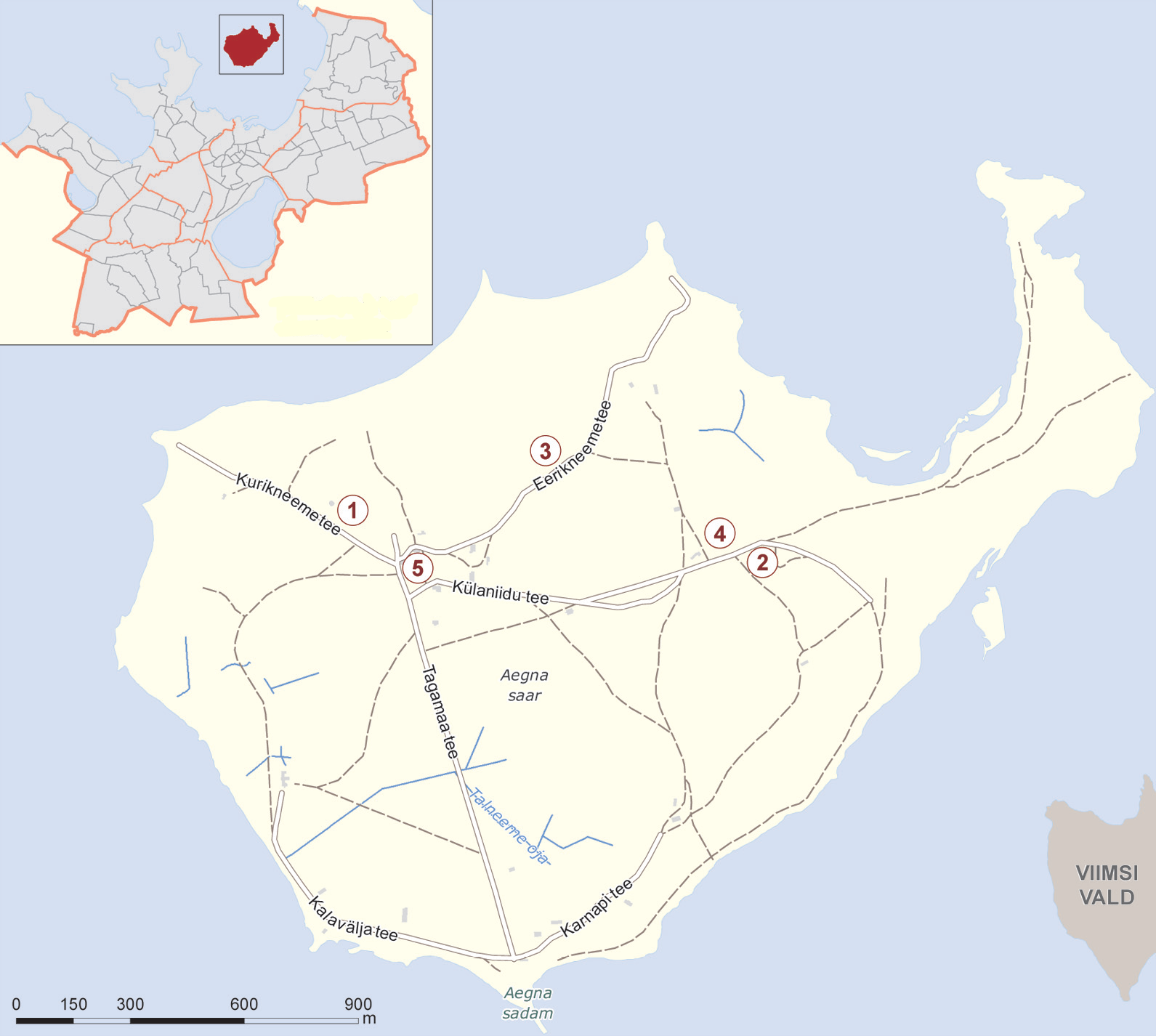

Geography
- Location: Bay of Finland
- Area: 3.01 km^{2} (1.16 sq mi)
- Highest point: 14.6m

Administration
- Estonia
- Harju County

Demographics
- Population: 21 (01.01.2022)
- Pop. density: 7/km^{2} (18/sq mi)

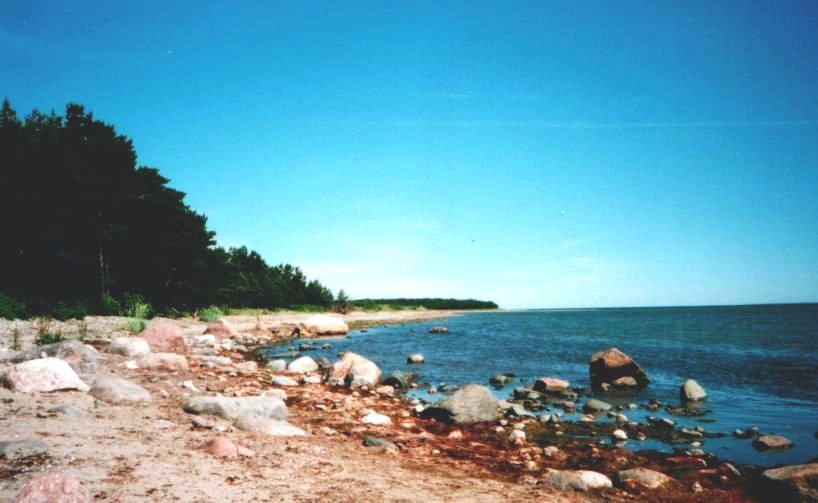
Aegna coast

Aegna is an Estonian island in the Bay of Tallinn in the Baltic Sea. Administratively it is part of the city of Tallinn, the capital of Estonia and is a sub district of the Kesklinn (City center) district.

== Geography ==
Aegna has an area of 3 km^{2} and lies off the Viimsi Peninsula, around 1.5 km northwest of Rohuneeme and 14 km north of Tallinn. It has a 10 km coastline, which includes two sandy beaches. The island's highest point is about 13 m above sea level.

As of 1 January 2020, Aegna had 16 permanent residents.

== Attractions ==
Aegna is a popular destination for day and camping trips, and has around 15 km of walking routes. There is also a WDS Aegna Meditation and Development Centre, opened in the summer time.

On the island stands the Eerikukivi, a glacial erratic declared Protected Natural Monument.

== History ==
Aegna's history dates back thousands of years, but the first written accounts of the island go back to 1297, when Danish king Erik prohibited forestry on the islands of Naissaar and Aegna. Northern Estonia or Estland was also part of Denmark over a century, including Aegna. Historically, the population of Aegna has been mixed with predominantly Estonian and Swedish inhabitants. Inhabitants of the island were mostly fishermen.

Aegna has been used for military purposes during the Imperial Russia, Imperial Germany, Republic of Estonia, Soviet occupation time, Third Reich and again Soviet occupation time of Estonia. Military remains that can still be seen include those of a military watchtower, a large gun battery with tunnels, and the narrow-gauge railway used in its construction.

On 10 August 2005 a Copterline helicopter on Tallinn–Helsinki route crashed 3 km south of the island. All 14 people on the helicopter died.

== Transport ==
The small ferry Juku operates to and from the island during the summer months, with support from the city of Tallinn. In the summer of 2010 the Juku was operated by Kihnu Veeteed

During the summer Tallinn-Cruises operate sightseeing tours to the island using the boat "Monica"

The island can also be reached by boats or yachts chartered from Pirita Harbour

In 2022 a new ferry was introduced, reducing the journey time to Aegna to 30 minutes. The Vegtind can accommodate 100 passengers and 20 bicycles, and is operated by the company Spinnaker.

=== Port ===
Port of Aegna
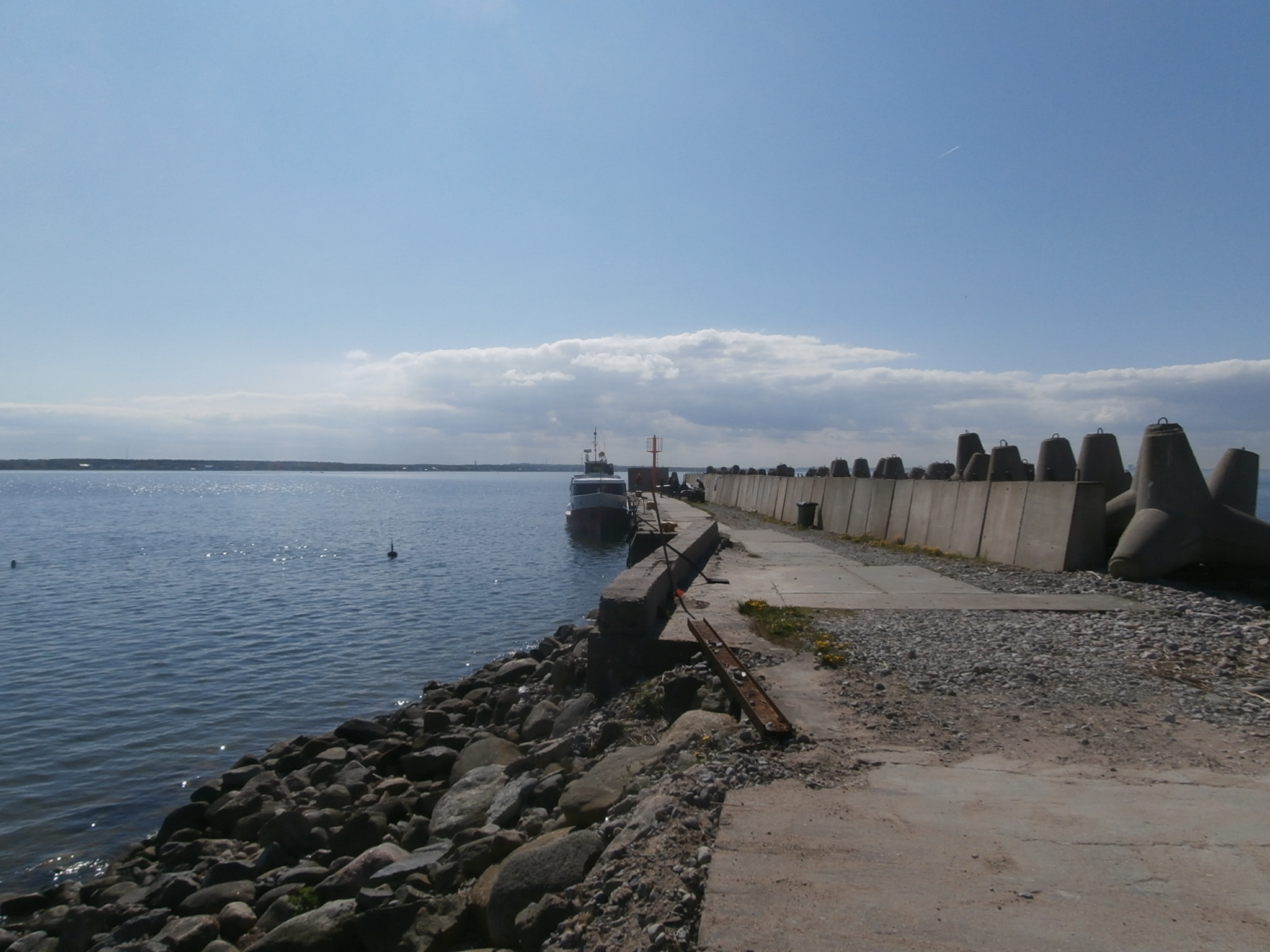
- Vesta at quay 1 in Port of Aegna
- Interactive map of Port of Aegna

Location
- Country: Estonia
- Location: Aegna, Tallinn
- Coordinates: 59°34′16.08″N 24°45′28.68″E

Details
- Opened: 15 September 2009
- Operated by: Tallinna Keskkonna- ja Kommunaalamet
- Land area: 12,397 square metres (1.2397 ha)
- No. of piers: 1

The Port of Aegna (port code EE AEN, Estonian: Aegna sadam) is a seaport situated on the southern coast of Aegna.

== See also ==
- List of islands of Estonia
- Transport in Estonia
