= List of heliports in Turkey =

List of heliports

Name	Type	Location	Province	Coordinates
Kanyon Heliport	Private	Şişli	Istanbul	41°4′42.02″N 29°0′42.15″E
Diyarbakır Heliport	Public	Yenişehir	Diyarbakır	37°54′36″N 40°8′10″E
Bağlar Heliport	Public	Bağlar	Diyarbakır	37°55′17.00″N 40°9′22.00″E
G.L.İ. Heliport	Public	Tavşanlı	Kütahya	39°37′55.00″N 29°28′26.00″E
İlkadım Heliport	Public	İlkadım	Samsun	41°16′25.00″N 36°17′56.00″E
Atatürk Heliport	Public	Yenimahalle	Ankara	39°54′7.00″N 32°45′36.00″E
Güvercinlik Army AB	Military	Etimesgut	Ankara	39°56′05.82″N 32°44′26.79″E
Cengiz Topel Naval AS	Military	İzmit	Kocaeli	40°44′06.10″N 30°05′00.01″E
Istanbul Hezarfen Airfield	Private	Çatalca	Istanbul	41°06′16.2″N 28°33′00″E
Samandıra Army AB	Military	Kartal	Istanbul	40°59′34″N 029°12′56″E
D-Marin Turgutreis Marina Heliport	Private	Bodrum	Muğla	37°00′11.00″N 27°15′43.00″E
İzmir Atatürk Heliport	Public	Konak	İzmir	38°23′53.60″N 27°6′10.71″E
Point Hotel Heliport	Private	Şişli	Istanbul	41°3′51.20″N 29°0′38.48″E
Kocatepe Heliport	Public	Afyonkarahisar	Afyonkarahisar	38°47′25.15″N 30°28′5.23″E
Beyhekim Heliport	Public	Selçuklu	Konya	37°59′14.00″N 32°29′1.00″E
Erguvan Heliport	Public	Osmangazi	Bursa	40°13′33.00″N 29°4′24.00″E
Arçelik Heliport	Private	Tuzla	Istanbul	40°49′22.13″N 29°21′33.54″E
Adana Sağlık Heliport	Public	Yüreğir	Adana	37°0′30.00″N 35°20′28.00″E
Etlik Heliport	Public	Yenimahalle	Ankara	39°57′53.00″N 32°49′47.00″E
Engürü Heliport	Private	Sincan	Ankara	39°57′24.00″N 32°02′2.36″E
K.E.A.H. Heliport	Public	Keçiören	Ankara	40°0′11.60″N 32°51′21.90″E
Hızırbey Heliport	Public	Trabzon	Trabzon	40°0′11.60″N 32°51′21.90″E
Kayseri 112 Heliport	Public	Melikgazi	Kayseri	38°41′53.00″N 35°32′8.00″E
Arkas 1 Heliport	Private	Konak	İzmir	38°26′28.00″N 27°06′36.00″E
Sivrihisar Aviation Center	Private	Sivrihisar	Eskişehir	39°17′59.29″N 31°29′38.50″E
