= Copterline Flight 103 =

2005 helicopter accident

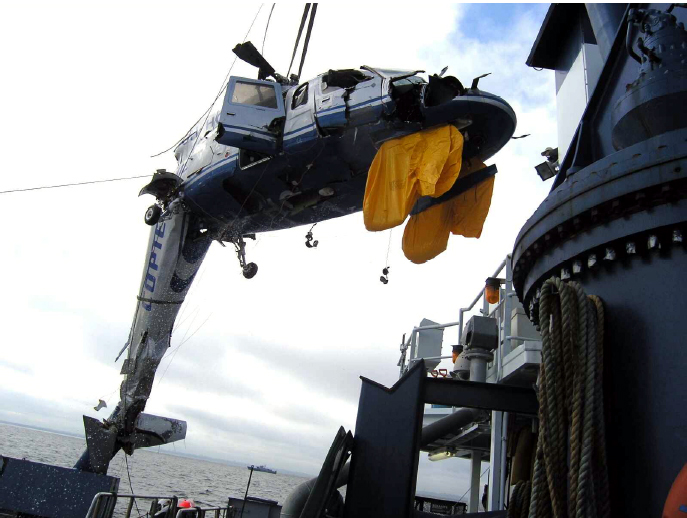
- The helicopter being recovered from the bay

Accident
- Date: 10 August 2005
- Summary: Servo failure
- Site: Tallinn Bay, Estonia; 59°32.546′N 024°43.852′E

Aircraft
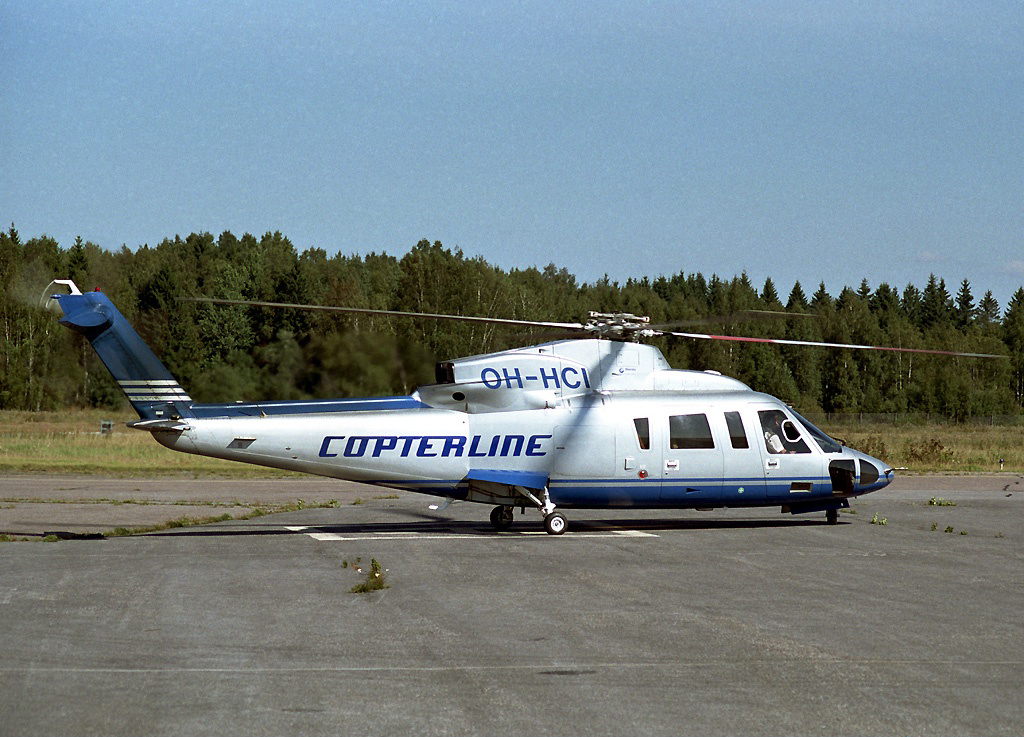
- OH-HCI, the helicopter involved, photographed in 2002.
- Aircraft type: Sikorsky S-76C+
- Operator: Copterline
- ICAO flight No.: AAQ103
- Call sign: COPTERLINE 103
- Registration: OH-HCI
- Occupants: 14
- Passengers: 12
- Crew: 2
- Fatalities: 14
- Survivors: 0

Copterline Flight 103 (AAQ103) was a Copterline helicopter flight en route to Helsinki, Finland from Tallinn, Estonia that crashed into the Tallinn Bay on 10 August 2005, at 12:45 local time.

The Sikorsky S-76C+ crash occurred three to five minutes after taking off. On board were two Finnish crew members and twelve passengers: six Finns, four Estonians and two Americans. There were no survivors.

== Crash ==
People on board by nationality
Nationality	Passengers	Crew
Finland	6	2
Estonia	4	
United States	2	
Total	12	2

The crew members were 41-year-old Captain Peter Fredriksson, he had 7,068 hours of flight time, with 173 of these on the Sikorsky S-76; and First Officer Seppo Peurala, aged 56, had accumulated 7,618 hours of helicopter flight time, of which just over 258 hours were on the Sikorsky S-76.

The helicopter was flying at an altitude of about 500 metres (1,600 ft) when it suddenly lost its steerability and plunged into the sea. The emergency floats didn't inflate in time and the wreck sank quickly. All those on board perished by drowning.

The Sikorsky S-76C+ emergency pontoons for water landings were deployed but couldn't inflate in time, no distress signals were heard, although it later emerged that the pilots had tried to send an emergency message shortly before the crash.

Rescuers reached the site in less than 10 minutes to find just one main rotor blade and an oil slick on the water. The wreckage of the helicopter itself was located by sonar operators on the Estonian Maritime Administration vessel EVA-320, who indicated that the aircraft was intact at a depth of roughly 43 metres (141 ft). Two Estonian deep-sea divers following an earlier unmanned robotic vehicle reported that the bodies of the passengers were inside the craft. Thirteen bodies were retrieved, with one pilot missing. The recovery mission was hindered by rough weather conditions. The wreckage of the aircraft was lifted on 13 August 2005 and transported to Tallinn for investigation. The missing pilot was not found in the initial searches performed by the Estonian and Finnish authorities, but the body was finally located on 25 August and retrieved by volunteer divers some distance away from the accident site. The post mortem indicated that the victims died from drowning.

== Investigation ==
The Estonian authorities refused to send the flight data recorder of the helicopter to the United States because the aircraft was manufactured there, thus possibly creating a conflict of interest. The technical investigation was instead performed in the United Kingdom. The voice recording indicated that the pilots realized that something was wrong only 35 seconds before the helicopter hit the sea, and that they did attempt to send a Mayday message.

The accident investigation board published a preliminary report on 14 September 2005, in which they ruled out most possibilities of physical damage before the helicopter hit water, including sabotage and collision with a flock of birds. As the helicopter was manufactured in the United States, the U.S. National Transportation Safety Board (NTSB) has taken part in the investigation. In November 2005, the NTSB issued an "urgent" recommendation to the FAA to require all S-76 operators to carry out "immediate visual and laboratory examinations" of main rotor servos for plasma flakes and other contamination. The helicopter manufacturer, Sikorsky Aircraft, rejected these findings, saying it and servo manufacturer HR Textron "do not agree that the servo caused the mishap". In December 2005 the company, however, issued an all-operators letter recommending that operators carry out internal leakage tests of all S-76 main rotor servos, at the same time emphasizing that testing with an intentionally degraded servo "has not identified any safety of flight issues".

The talks between Copterline and Sikorsky Aircraft about how to divide damages arising from the crash broke down in December 2006, and Copterline sued Sikorsky Aircraft in a U.S. court in New York for damages of 60 million US dollars.

In August 2007 it was announced that the cause of the crash was a failure of the hydraulic flight control system, caused by coating flaking off from servo pistons. The loosened plasma coating flakes blocked the return valves of the servos, causing the aircraft to abruptly lose its maneuverability. Copterline did not have the authority to service or even open these components. However, in the final report, Copterline was criticized for omitting a periodic leak test of the hydraulic flight control system that could have revealed the problem. The Finnish authorities were also criticized for insufficient supervision.
