= List of Estonian architects =

Following is a list of notable architects from Estonia:

== A–M ==
- Mattias Agabus
- Helmut Ajango
- Arnold Alas
- Indrek Allmann
- Andres Alver
- Martin Aunin
- Dmitri Bruns
- Karl Burman Sr.
- Eero Endjärv
- Hanno Grossschmidt
- Eugen Habermann
- Tomomi Hayashi
- Georg Hellat
- Jaak Huimerind
- Erich Jacoby
- Peep Jänes
- Herbert Johanson
- Velle Kadalipp
- Ott Kadarik
- Raine Karp
- Hindrek Kesler
- Tõnis Kimmel
- Andri Kirsima
- August Komendant
- Katrin Koov
- Alar Kotli
- Raivo Kotov
- Ernst Kühnert
- Vilen Künnapu
- Edgar Johan Kuusik
- Tarmo Laht
- Tõnu Laigu
- Leonhard Lapin
- Elmar Lohk
- Marika Lõoke
- Urmas Lõoke
- Ra Luhse
- Ülar Mark
- Allan Murdmaa
- Urmas Muru
- Margit Mutso

== N–Z ==
- Robert Natus
- Erika Nõva
- Maarja Nummert
- Jüri Okas
- Ain Padrik
- Eero Palm
- Arent Passer
- Peeter Pere
- Andres Põime
- Valve Pormeister
- Mart Port
- Uno Prii
- Raivo Puusepp
- Enn Rajasaar
- Ilmar Reepalu
- Jacques Rosenbaum
- Eugen Sacharias
- Mai Šein
- Henno Sepmann
- Andres Siim
- Olev Siinmaa
- Hilda Taba
- Elmar Tampõld
- Karl Tarvas
- Peeter Tarvas
- Jaan Tiidemann
- Uno Tölpus
- Villem Tomiste
- Tiit Trummal
- Meeli Truu
- Illimar Truverk
- Tanel Tuhal
- Mihkel Tüür
- Emil Urbel
- Teodor Ussisoo
- Veronika Valk
- Siiri Vallner
- Kalle Vellevoog
- August Volberg

== See also ==
- List of architects
- List of Estonians
