= List of Estonians =

This is a list of notable people from Estonia, or of Estonian ancestry.

== Architects ==
- Andres Alver (born 1953)
- Dmitri Bruns (1929–2020)
- Karl Burman (1882–1965)
- Eugen Habermann (1884–1944)
- Georg Hellat (1870–1943)
- Otto Pius Hippius (1826–1883)
- Erich Jacoby (1885–1941)
- Herbert Johanson (1884–1964)
- Peep Jänes (born 1936)
- Louis I. Kahn (1901–1974) (USA)
- Raine Karp (born 1939)
- Alar Kotli (1904–1963)
- Edgar-Johan Kuusik (1888–1974)
- Ernst Gustav Kühnert (1885–1961)
- Vilen Künnapu (born 1948)
- Elmar Lohk (1901–1963)
- Ülar Mark (born 1968)
- Margit Mutso (born 1966)
- Robert Natus (1890–1950)
- Uno Prii (1924–2000)
- Raivo Puusepp (born 1960)
- Jacques Rosenbaum (1878–1944)
- Eugen Sacharias (1906–2002)
- Olev Siinmaa (1881–1948)
- Elmar Tampõld (1920–2013)

== Business and politics ==
- Hardo Aasmäe (1951–2014), geographer, politician, encyclopedist
- Friedrich Akel (1871–1941), politician, former head of state
- Andrus Ansip (born 1956), politician, former prime minister
- Jaan Anvelt (1884–1937), politician
- Ado Birk (1883–1942), politician
- Kaarel Eenpalu (Karl Einbund, 1888–1942), politician, former head of state
- Ene Ergma (born 1944), politician
- Magnus Gabriel De la Gardie (1622–1686), politician (Sweden)
- Karoli Hindriks (born 1983), entrepreneur
- Toomas Hendrik Ilves (born 1953), journalist, politician, former president
- Ernst Jaakson (1905–1998), diplomat
- Jüri Jaakson (1870–1942), politician, former head of state
- Steve Jurvetson (born 1967), businessman (United States)
- Kaja Kallas (born 1977), politician, former prime minister
- Siim Kallas (1948–2026), politician, former prime minister
- Carmen Kass (born 1978), supermodel, businesswoman, and politician
- Tunne Kelam (born 1936), politician
- Tõnis Kint (1896–1991), politician, prime minister in exile
- August Koern (1900–1989), diplomat, foreign minister in exile
- Juhan Kukk (1885–1942), politician, former head of state
- Mart Laar (born 1960), historian, politician, former prime minister
- Rein Lang (born 1957), journalist, businessman, politician
- Robert Lepikson (1952–2006), businessman, politician
- Elmar Lipping (19061994), politician, foreign minister in exile
- Hjalmar Mäe (1901–1978), politician, head of self-administration during German occupation
- Tiit Made (born 1940), journalist, politician
- Linnart Mäll (1938–2010), orientalist, politician
- Harry Männil (1920–2010), businessman, art collector
- Heinrich Mark (1911–2004), politician, former prime minister in exile
- Jaan Manitski (born 1942), businessman, politician, former foreign minister
- Lennart Meri (1929–2006), writer, filmmaker, foreign minister, president
- Jüri Mõis (born 1956), businessman, politician
- Ülo Nugis (1944–2011), politician, economist
- Kristiina Ojuland (born 1966), politician, former foreign minister
- Lembit Öpik (born 1965), politician (United Kingdom)
- Rein Otsason (1931–2004), economist, businessman
- Siiri Oviir (born 1947), politician
- Ivari Padar (born 1965), politician
- Tõnis Palts (born 1953), politician, businessman
- Sir Arvi Parbo (1926–2019), businessman (Australia)
- Juhan Parts (born 1966), politician, former prime minister
- Leida Peips (born 1937), milker and political figure
- Ants Piip (1885-1942), politician, former head of state
- Jüri Pihl (1954-2019), politician
- Konstantin Päts (1874–1956), journalist, politician, first president of Estonia
- Jaan Poska (1866–1920), diplomat, politician
- Jüri Ratas (born 1978), politician, former prime minister
- August Rei (1886–1963), diplomat, politician, former head of state, prime minister in exile
- Alfred Rosenberg (1893–1946), politician, ideologist, war criminal (Nazi Germany)
- Arnold Rüütel (born 1928), agricultural manager, politician, former president
- Edgar Savisaar (born 1950), politician, former prime minister
- Mart Siimann (born 1946), politician, former prime minister
- Johannes Sikkar (1897–1960), politician
- Artur Sirk (1900–1937), officer, lawyer, politician
- Otto Strandman (1875–1941), politician, former head of state
- Rein Taagepera (born 1933), political scientist, politician
- Jaak Tamm (1950–1999), politician
- Andres Tarand (born 1940), politician, former prime minister
- Indrek Tarand (born 1964), politician, journalist
- Enn Tarto (1938–2021), anti-Soviet dissident, politician
- Otto Tief (1889–1976), military officer, politician
- Jaan Tõnisson (1868–1941?), journalist, politician
- Anton Uesson (1879–1942), politician, engineer
- Jüri Uluots (1890–1945), lawyer, politician
- Priit Willbach (born 1953), businessman, politician
- Jüri Vilms (1889–1918), lawyer, politician, first deputy prime minister
- Tiit Vähi (born 1947), businessman, politician, former prime minister
- Aleksander Warma (1890–1970), navy officer, diplomat, prime minister in exile

== Education and science ==
- Julius Aamisepp (1883–1950), agricultural scientist
- Johannes Aavik (1880–1973), linguist
- Jüri Allik (born 1949), psychologist
- Paul Ariste (1905–1990), linguist
- Karl Ernst von Baer (1792–1876), biologist
- Girsh Blumberg (born 1959), American - Estonian experimental physicist
- Karl Ernst Claus (1796–1864), chemist
- Georg Dehio (1850–1932), art historian
- Jaan Einasto (born 1929), astrophysicist
- Johann Friedrich Eschscholtz (1793–1831), entomologist
- Bengt Gottfried Forselius (c. 1660–1688), founder of public education
- Johannes Hint (1914–1985), physicist, inventor
- Jakob Hurt (1839–1906), linguist, collector of folklore
- Paul Kogerman (1891–1951), chemist
- Wolfgang Köhler (1887–1967), psychologist
- Nikolai Köstner (1889–1959), economist, politician
- Eerik Kumari (1912–1984), ornithologist
- Helga Kurm (1920–2011), dean of the Tartu State University Pedagogical Division
- Heinrich Lenz (1804–1865), physicist
- Elmar Leppik (1898–1978), biologist
- Otto Liiv (1905–1942), historian, archivist
- Endel Lippmaa (1930–2015), chemist, physicist, politician
- Mihhail Lotman (born 1952), semiotician
- Juri Lotman (1922–1993), semiotician
- Richard Karlovich Maack (1825–1886), geographer, botanist, Siberian explorer, educator
- Friedrich Martens (1845–1909), diplomat, international lawyer
- Viktor Masing (1925–2001), ecologist
- Harri Moora (1900–1968), archaeologist
- Ragnar Nurkse (1907–1959), economist
- Ernst Öpik (1893–1985), astronomer
- Jaak Panksepp (1943–2017), psychobiologist, neuroscientist (USA)
- Erast Parmasto (1928–2012), mycologist
- Georg Friedrich Parrot (1767–1852)
- Johann Friedrich Parrot (1791–1841), physician, explorer
- Jaan Puhvel (born 1932), linguist (USA)
- Ludvig Puusepp (1875–1942), medical scientist, neurosurgeon
- Riinu Rannap (born 1966), zoologist
- Georg Wilhelm Richmann (1711–1753), physicist
- Hillar M. Rootare (1928–2008), chemist
- Mart Saarma (born 1949), molecular biologist
- Thomas Seebeck (1770–1831), physicist
- Otto Wilhelm von Struve (1819–1905), astronomer
- Svante Pääbo (born 1955), paleogeneticist (Sweden)
- Eduard von Toll (1858–1902?), geologist, Arctic explorer
- Endel Tulving (born 1927), psychologist (Canada)
- Jakob von Uexküll (1864–1944), biologist, semiotician
- Lauri Vaska (1925–2015), chemist (USA)
- Mihkel Veske (1843–1890), linguist, poet
- Gustav Vilbaste (1885–1967), botanist
- Edgar de Wahl (1867–1948), mathematician, creator of Interlingue

== Literature and journalism ==
- Artur Adson (1889–1977), poet
- Artur Alliksaar (1923–1966), poet
- Betti Alver (1906–1989), poet
- Elise Aun (1863–1932), poet
- Johannes Barbarus (1890–1946), poet
- Nikolai Baturin (1936–2019), writer
- Aimée Beekman (born 1933), writer
- Vladimir Beekman (1929–2009), poet, novelist, translator
- Eduard Bornhöhe (1862–1923), writer
- Ernst Enno (1875–1934), poet
- Friedrich Robert Faehlmann (1798–1850), writer, physician
- August Gailit (1891–1960), writer
- Ado Grenzstein (1849–1916), journalist
- Lehte Hainsalu (born 1938), poet, novelist, children's author
- Indrek Hargla (born 1970), writer, screenwriter
- Peeter Helme (born 1978), writer, journalist
- Sass Henno (born 1982), writer
- Helen Hindpere, writer
- August Wilhelm Hupel (1737–1819), ecclesiastic writer, ethnologist
- Ivar Ivask (1927–1992), literary scholar, critic, poet
- Carl Robert Jakobson (1841–1882), journalist, political activist
- Johann Voldemar Jannsen (1819–1890), journalist, political activist
- Lydia Jannsen ("Koidula", 1843–1886), poet
- Fred Jüssi (born 1935–2024), nature writer, photographer
- Ain Kaalep (1926–2020), poet
- Bernard Kangro (1910–1994), poet, writer, journalist
- Jaan Kaplinski (1941–2021), writer, journalist, politician
- Doris Kareva (born 1958), poet
- Urve Karuks (1936–2015), Canadian-Estonian poet and translator
- Kaur Kender (born 1971), writer
- August Kitzberg (1855–1927), writer
- Albert Kivikas (1898–1978), writer
- Andrus Kivirähk (born 1970), writer
- Madis Kõiv (1929–2014), author, physicist and philosopher
- Friedrich Reinhold Kreutzwald (1803–1882), writer, author of national epic, physician
- Jaan Kross (1920–2007), writer
- Kalle Kurg (born 1942), poet, writer, critic, translator
- Paul Kuusberg (1916–2003), writer
- Kalle Lasn (born 1942), magazine editor, film maker, activist (Canada)
- Kalju Lepik (1920–1999), poet
- Juhan Liiv (1864–1913), poet, writer
- Martin Lipp (1854–1923), poet
- Viivi Luik (born 1946), poet
- Oskar Luts (1887–1953), writer
- Iko Maran (1915–1999), writer
- Otto Wilhelm Masing (1763–1862), pastor, philologist, journalist
- Uku Masing (1909–1985), poet, theologian, ethnologist
- Lennart Meri (1929–2006), writer, politician
- Kersti Merilaas (1913–1986), poet, playwright
- Mait Metsanurk (1879–1957), writer
- Mihkel Mutt (born 1953), writer, critic
- August Mälk (1900–1987), writer
- Ellen Niit (1928–2016), children's writer, poet and translator
- Minni Nurme (1917–1994), writer and poet
- Tõnu Õnnepalu ("Emil Tode", born 1962), writer
- Ants Oras (1900–1982), writer and translator
- Eeva Park (born 1950), writer and poet
- Aino Pervik (1932–2025), children's writer and translator
- Kristjan Jaak Peterson (1801–1822), poet
- Lilli Promet (1922–2007), writer
- Eno Raud (1928–1996), children's book author
- Mart Raud (1903–1980), writer
- Hugo Raudsepp (1883–1952), playwright
- Karl Ristikivi (1912–1977), writer, poet
- Aarne Ruben (born 1971), writer
- Paul-Eerik Rummo (born 1942), poet, politician
- Balthasar Russow (c. 1536–1600), chronicler
- Peeter Sauter (born 1962), writer
- Johannes Semper (1892–1970), writer, poet
- Juhan Smuul (1922–1971), writer, poet
- Gustav Suits (1883–1956), poet
- Heiti Talvik (1904–1947), poet
- Harald Tammer (1899–1942), journalist
- A. H. Tammsaare (1878–1940), writer
- Mats Traat (born 1936), author, poet
- Tõnu Trubetsky (born 1963), writer, musician, film director
- Friedebert Tuglas (1886–1971), writer, critic, literary scholar
- Marie Under (1883–1980), poet
- Mati Unt (1944–2005), writer, stage director
- Jaak Urmet ("Wimberg"; born 1979), journalist, poet
- Edgar Valter (1929–2006), writer, artist
- Arvo Valton (born 1935), writer
- Priit Vesilind (born 1943), journalist, photographer, author (United States)
- Enn Vetemaa (born 1936), writer
- Juhan Viiding ("Jüri Üdi", 1948–1995), poet, actor
- Paul Viiding (1904–1962), poet
- Eduard Vilde (1865–1933), writer, journalist
- Heiki Vilep (born 1960), writer
- Henrik Visnapuu (1890–1951), poet, journalist
- Gero von Wilpert (1933–2009), writer
- Hella Wuolijoki (1886–1954), writer, politician (Finland)

== Military and seafaring ==
- Avdy Andresson (1899–1990), minister of war in exile
- Fabian Gottlieb von Bellingshausen (1778–1852), geographer, navigator, admiral
- Alexander von Benckendorff (1783–1844), general, politician
- Konstantin von Benckendorff (1785–1828), general, diplomat
- Herbert Brede (1888–1942), general
- Aleksander Einseln (1931–2017), general, commander of defence forces
- Jacob De la Gardie (1583–1652), officer, statesman
- Otto Heinze (1877–1968), general
- Nikolai Helk (1885–1942), general
- Aleksander Jaakson (1892–1942), general, statesman
- Martin Jervan (1891–1942), general
- Otto von Kotzebue (1787–1846), geographer, navigator
- Tarmo Kõuts (born 1953), admiral, politician
- Adam Johann von Krusenstern (1770–1846), geographer, navigator
- Julius Kuperjanov (1894–1919), officer
- Ants Laaneots (born 1948), general
- Johan Laidoner (1884–1953), general, politician
- Andres Larka (1879–1942), general, politician
- Hans Leesment (1873–1944), general
- Lembitu of Lehola (died 1217), tribal elder, military commander
- Andres Nuiamäe (1982–2004), first Estonian soldier killed in action in Iraq
- Karl Parts (1886–1941), officer
- Johan Pitka (1872–1944?), admiral, politician
- Ernst Põdder (1879–1932), general
- Viktor Puskar (1889–1943), officer
- Alfons Rebane (1908–1976), officer, intelligence operative
- Nikolai Reek (1890–1942), general
- Harald Riipalu (1912–1961), officer
- Paul Maitla (1913–1945), officer
- Harald Nugiseks (1921–2014), officer
- August Sabbe (1909–1978), anti-Soviet armed resistance fighter
- Jaan Soots (1880–1942), general
- Aleksander Tõnisson (1875–1941), general
- Jaan Usin (1887–1941), navy officer, commander of the Peipsi flotilla
- Ferdinand von Wrangel (1796–1870), Arctic explorer

== Music ==
- Evald Aav (1900–1939), composer, choir conductor
- Juhan Aavik (1884–1982), composer, conductor
- Urmas Alender (1953–1994), pop musician
- Olav Ehala (born 1950), composer
- Heino Eller (1887–1970), composer
- Olari Elts (born 1971), conductor
- Gustav Ernesaks (1908–1993), composer, conductor
- Eda-Ines Etti ("Ines", born 1981), pop musician
- Meelika Hainsoo (born 1979) folk singer, musician
- Miina Härma (1864–1941), composer, conductor
- Maarja-Liis Ilus ("Maarja", born 1980), pop musician
- Getter Jaani (born 1993), singer, actress
- Neeme Järvi (born 1937), conductor
- Paavo Järvi (born 1962), conductor
- Piret Järvis (born 1984), rock musician
- Joonatan Jürgenson (born 1991), classical pianist
- Artur Kapp (1878–1952), composer
- Eugen Kapp (1908–1996), composer
- Tõnu Kaljuste (born 1953), conductor
- Mari Kalkun (born 1986), folk singer
- Paul Kostabi (born 1962), musician
- Maarja Kivi ("Marya Roxx", born 1986), rock/metal musician
- Triinu Kivilaan (born 1989), model, pop/rock musician
- Eri Klas (1939–2016), conductor
- Kerli Kõiv ("Kerli", born 1987), musician, songwriter
- Cyrillus Kreek (1889–1962), composer
- Lenna Kuurmaa (born 1985), rock musician
- Heli Lääts (1932–2018), singer
- Käbi Laretei (1922–2014), pianist, composer, writer
- Artur Lemba (1885–1963), pianist, composer
- Ott Lepland (born 1987), singer, actor
- Ivo Linna (born 1949), singer, pop musician
- Uno Loop (1930–2021), singer, musician, athlete, actor, educator
- Mihkel Lüdig (1880–1958) composer, organist, choir conductor
- Ester Mägi (1922–2021), composer
- Tõnis Mägi (born 1948), singer, pop musician
- Alo Mattiisen (1961–1996), composer
- Maria Minerva (born 1988), experimental musician
- Sandra Nurmsalu (born 1988), singer
- Maarja Nuut (born 1986), singer and violinist
- Birgit Õigemeel (born 1988), singer
- Georg Ots (1920–1975), opera singer
- Tanel Padar (born 1980), pop musician
- Rene Pais ("Syn Cole", born 1988), DJ, record producer
- Arvo Pärt (born 1935), composer
- Annely Peebo (born 1971), opera singer
- Kristiina Poska (born 1978), conductor
- Jaan Rääts (1932–2020), composer
- Kalle Randalu (born 1955), pianist
- Rein Rannap (born 1953), composer, pianist
- Vardo Rumessen (born 1942), pianist, politician
- Mart Saar (1882–1963), composer
- Evelin Samuel (born 1975), pop musician
- Mart Sander (born 1967), singer, actor
- Urmas Sisask (born 1960), composer
- Katrin Siska (born 1983), rock musician
- Eduard Sõrmus (1878–1940), violinist
- Lepo Sumera (1950–2000), composer
- Eeva Talsi (born 1988), folk musician
- Eino Tamberg (1930–2010), composer
- Tomas Tammemets ("Tommy Cash", born 1991), singer, visual artist
- Kalmer Tennosaar (1928–2004), singer, TV journalist
- Rudolf Tobias (1873–1918), composer
- Helen Tobias-Duesberg (1919–2010), composer
- Kärt Tomingas (1967–2025), actress, singer-songwriter
- Koit Toome (born 1979), pop musician
- Veljo Tormis (1930–2017), composer
- Tõnu Trubetsky (born 1963), singer, composer, writer
- Eduard Tubin (1905–1982), composer
- Erkki-Sven Tüür (born 1959), composer
- Raimond Valgre (1913–1949), composer
- Iiris Vesik (born 1991), musician
- Anne Veski (born 1956), pop musician
- Asta Vihandi (1929–1993), opera singer, actress
- Vello Viisimaa (1928–1991), singer, actor

== Performing arts ==
- Argo Aadli (born 1980), actor
- Ott Aardam (born 1980), actor
- Tõnu Aav (1939–2019), actor
- Eino Baskin (1929–2015), actor and director
- Taavi Eelmaa (born 1971), actor
- Herta Elviste (1923–2015), actress
- Ants Eskola (1908–1989), actor
- Ita Ever (born 1931), actress
- Viiu Härm (born 1944), actress, poet
- Kersti Heinloo (born 1976), actress
- Evald Hermaküla (1941–2000), actor and director
- Tanel Ingi (born 1976), actor
- Jüri Järvet (1919–1995), actor
- Ülle Kaljuste (born 1957), actress
- Tõnu Kark (born 1947), actor
- Volli Käro (born 1940), actor
- Carmen Kass (born 1978), supermodel
- Kaljo Kiisk (1925–2007), actor, film director and politician
- Miliza Korjus (1909–1980), opera singer, film actress
- Hele Kõrve (born 1980), actress, singer
- Risto Kübar (born 1983), actor
- Tiiu Kuik (born 1987), model
- Betty Kuuskemaa (1879–1966), actress
- Lia Laats (1926–2004), actress
- Lauri Lagle (born 1981), actor, director, screenwriter
- Silvia Laidla (1927–2012), actress
- Anu Lamp (born 1958), actress and director
- Kai Leete (1910–1995), ballet and folk dancer
- Astrid Lepa (1924–2015), actress and director
- Tiit Lilleorg (born 1941), actor
- Raine Loo (1945–2020), actress
- Aksella Luts (1905–2005), actress, screenwriter
- Ain Lutsepp (born 1954), actor and politician
- Theodor Luts (1896–1980), director and cinematographer
- Ain Mäeots (born 1971), actor, director, producer
- Laine Mägi (born 1959), actress and choreographer
- Mait Malmsten (born 1972), actor
- Heino Mandri (1922–1990), actor
- Konstantin Märska (1896–1951), cinematographer
- Marko Matvere (born 1968), actor
- Laine Mesikäpp (1917–2012), actress, singer, folk song collector
- Mikk Mikiver (1937–2006), stage director, actor
- Ornella Muti (born 1955), film actress (Italy)
- Gerd Neggo (1891–1974), dancer, choreographer
- Ester Pajusoo (1934-2026), actress
- Paul Pinna (1884–1949), actor, stage director
- Mirtel Pohla (born 1982), actress
- Salme Poopuu (1939–2017), actress, filmmaker
- Erik Norkroos (born 1969), cinematographer, producer, editor and director
- Kalju Orro (born 1952), actor
- Priit Pärn (born 1946), animated film maker, graphic artist
- Leida Rammo (1924–2020), actress
- Elsa Ratassepp (1893–1972), actress
- Tõnis Rätsep (born 1947), actor, singer, educator, poet, playwright and author
- Evi Rauer (1915–2004), actress
- Salme Reek (1907–1996), actress
- Enn Reitel (born 1950), film actor (UK)
- Jaan Rekkor (1958), actor
- Moonika Siimets (born 1980), film director
- Meeli Sööt (born 1937), actress
- Eero Spriit (born 1949), actor and producer
- Arno Suurorg (1903–1960), actor
- Mena Suvari (born 1979), actress (USA)
- Aino Talvi (1909–1992), actress
- Kärt Tomingas (born 1967), actress, singer
- Tanel Toom (born 1982), Oscar-nominated film director and screenwriter
- Jaan Tooming (born 1946), actor, theatre and film director and writer
- Aarne Üksküla (1937–2017), actor
- Lembit Ulfsak (1947–2017), actor
- Olli Ungvere (1906–1991), actress and singer
- Katariina Unt (born 1971), actress
- Ivo Uukkivi (born 1965), actor and musician
- Jan Uuspõld (born 1973), actor, musician
- Viire Valdma (born 1960), actress
- Ragne Veensalu (born 1986), actress
- Kullar Viimne (born 1980), film director and cinematographer
- Evelin Võigemast (born 1980), actress, singer
- Priit Võigemast (born 1980), actor

== Religion ==
- Herman (Aav) (1878–1961), head of Finnish Orthodox Church
- Jaan Kiivit, Jr (1940–2005), archbishop
- Jaan Kiivit, Sr (1906–1971), archbishop
- Jakob Kukk (1870–1933), bishop
- Johan Kõpp (1874–1970), bishop and archbishop
- Juhan Leinberg (1812–1885), founder of a religious sect (the Maltsvetians)
- Kuno Pajula (1924–2012), archbishop
- Andres Põder (born 1949), archbishop
- Hugo Rahamägi (1886–1941), bishop
- Alexey Ridiger (Patriarch Alexius II, 1929–2008), head of Orthodox Church (Russia)
- Arthur Võõbus (1909–1988), theologian, orientalist, church historian

== Sport ==
- Moonika Aava (born 1979), javelin thrower
- Arvi Aavik (born 1969), wrestler
- Aleksander Aberg (1881–1920), wrestler
- Friedrich Amelung (1842–1909), chess player
- Maret Ani (born 1982), tennis player
- Ants Antson (1938–2015), speedskater, Olympic medalist
- Paul Aron (born 2004), racing driver
- Ralf Aron (born 1998), racing driver
- Marko Asmer (born 1984), racing driver
- Lauri Aus (1970–2003), cyclist
- Aleksei Budõlin (born 1976), judoka, Olympic medalist
- Toomas Edur (born 1954), NHL hockey player
- Jaan Ehlvest (born 1962), chess player
- Eduard Ellman-Eelma (1902–1943), football player
- August Englas (1925–2017), wrestler
- Gunnar Friedemann (1909–1943), chess player
- Jüri Jaanson (born 1965), rower, Olympic medalist
- Georg Hackenschmidt (1878–1968), wrestler
- Helger Hallik (born 1972), wrestler
- Kaido Höövelson ("Baruto Kaito"; born 1984), sumo wrestler
- Margus Hunt (born 1987), former discus thrower, former shot putter, American football player
- Elvy Kalep (1899–1989), aviator
- Kaia Kanepi (born 1985), tennis player
- Meelis Kanep (born 1983), chess grandmaster
- Gerd Kanter (born 1979), discus thrower, Olympic medalist
- Osvald Käpp (1905–1995), wrestler, Olympic medalist
- Paul Keres (1916–1975), chess player
- Lionel Kieseritzky (1806–1853), chess player
- Jaan Kikkas (1892–1944), weightlifter, Olympic medalist
- Jaan Kirsipuu (born 1969), cyclist
- Martin Klein (1884–1947), wrestler, Olympic medalist
- Aleksander Klumberg (1899–1958), decathlete, Olympic medalist
- Leo Komarov (born 1987), ice hockey player
- Anett Kontaveit (born 1995), tennis player
- Robin Kool ("ropz", born 1999), professional esports (Counter-Strike 2) player
- Anton Koolmann (1899–1953), wrestler
- Johannes Kotkas (1915–1998), wrestler, Olympic medalist
- Albert Kusnets (1902–1942), wrestler, Olympic medalist
- Marko Kristal (born 1973), football player
- Leho Laurine (1904–1998), chess player
- Tanel Leok (born 1985), motocross rider
- Siim Liivik (born 1988), ice hockey player
- Joel Lindpere (born 1981), footballer
- Heino Lipp (1922–2006), decathlete
- Jüri Lossmann (1891–1984), long distance runner, Olympic medalist
- Arnold Luhaäär (1905–1965), weightlifter, Olympic medalist
- Georg Lurich (1876–1920), wrestler
- Epp Mäe (born 1992), wrestler
- Jaak Mae (born 1972), skier, Olympic medalist
- Markko Märtin (born 1975), rally driver
- Tarmo Mitt (born 1977), World Strong Man
- Martin Müürsepp (born 1974), basketball player
- Heiki Nabi (born 1985), wrestler, Olympic medalist
- Iivo Nei (born 1931), chess player
- August Neo (1908–1982), wrestler, Olympic medalist
- Alfred Neuland (1895–1966), weightlifter, Olympic medalist
- Erki Nool (born 1970), decathlete, Olympic medalist
- Mati Nuude (1941–2001), weightlifter and singer
- Tõnu Õim (born 1941), chess player
- Lembit Oll (1966–1999), chess player
- Andres Oper (born 1977), football player
- Kristjan Palusalu (1908–1987), wrestler, Olympic medalist
- Indrek Pertelson (born 1971), judoka, Olympic medalist
- Mart Poom (born 1972), football player
- Eduard Pütsep (1898–1960), wrestler, Olympic medalist
- Kristjan Rahnu (born 1979), decathlete
- Ilmar Raud (1913–1941), chess player
- Michael Roos (Mihkel Roos, born 1982), American football player
- Salme Rootare (1913–1987), chess player
- Vidrik Rootare (c. 1900–1985), chess player
- Sven Salumaa (born 1966), tennis player
- Erika Salumäe (born 1962), cyclist, Olympic medalist
- Jane Salumäe (born 1968), marathon runner
- Ortvin Sarapu (1924–1999), chess player (New Zealand)
- Roman Steinberg (1900–1928), wrestler, Olympic medalist
- Alfred Schmidt (1898–1972), weightlifter, Olympic medalist
- Paul Felix Schmidt (1916–1984), chess player
- Aleksandr Selevko (born 2001), figure skater
- Mihhail Selevko (born 2002), figure skater
- Kristina Šmigun-Vähi (born 1977), skier, Olympic medalist
- Tiit Sokk (born 1964), basketball player (1988 Olympic gold medalist for USSR)
- Yuval Spungin (born 1987), Israeli footballer
- Nikolai Stepulov (1913–1968), boxer, Olympic medalist
- Toivo Suursoo (born 1975), ice hockey player
- Jaan Talts (born 1944), weightlifter, Olympic medalist
- Harald Tammer (1899–1942), journalist, athlete, weightlifter, Olympic medalist
- Aleksander Tammert (born 1973), discus thrower, Olympic medalist
- Ott Tänak (born 1987), rally driver
- Jüri Tarmak (born 1946), high jumper, Olympic medalist
- Kristin Tattar (born 1992), World Champion disc golfer
- Tõnu Tõniste (born 1967), yachtsman, businessman, Olympic medalist
- Toomas Tõniste (born 1967), yachtsman, businessman, Olympic medalist
- Johannes Türn (1898–1993), chess player
- Voldemar Väli (1903–1997), wrestler, Olympic medalist
- Andrus Värnik (born 1977), javelin thrower
- Andrus Veerpalu (born 1971), skier, Olympic medalist
- Siim-Sander Vene (born 1990), basketball player

== Visual arts ==
- Priidu Aavik (1905–1991), painter
- Amandus Adamson (1855–1929), sculptor
- Adamson-Eric (Erich Adamson, 1902–1968), painter
- Ellinor Aiki (1893–1969), painter
- Arnold Akberg (1894–1984), painter
- Peeter Allik (1966–2019), painter, black and white artist
- Efraim Allsalu (1929–2006), painter
- Jüri Arrak (1936–2022), painter
- Alfred Hirv (1880–1918), painter
- Raivo Järvi (1954–2012), illustrator, politician
- Mati Karmin (born 1959), sculptor
- Elmar Kits (1913–1972), painter
- Johann Köler (1826–1899), painter
- Andres Koort (born 1969), painter and scenographer
- Mark Kostabi (Kalev Mark Kostabi, born 1960), painter (United States)
- Meeli Kõiva (born 1960), painter, installation and light artist, sculptor, cinematographer, producer and film director (Finland, United States)
- Ants Laikmaa (1866–1943), painter
- Leonhard Lapin (1947–2022), graphic, painter, sculptor, architect
- Ivo Lill (1953–2019), glass artist
- Olav Maran (born 1933), artist
- Marko Mäetamm (born 1965), painter
- Konrad Mägi (1878–1925), painter
- Kadri Mälk (born 1958), jewelry artist
- Lydia Mei (1896–1965), painter
- Natalie Mei (1900–1975), painter
- Juhan Muks (1899–1983), painter
- Evald Okas (1915–2011), painter
- Eduard Ole (1898–1995), painter
- Ludvig Oskar (1874–1951), painter
- Ülo Õun (1940–1988), sculptor
- Tiit Pääsuke (born 1941), painter
- Karl Pärsimägi (1902–1942), painter
- Kaljo Põllu (1934–2010), painter, graphic artist
- Kristjan Raud (1865–1943), graphic artist
- Paul Raud (1865–1930), painter
- Enn Roos (1908–1990), sculptor
- Endel Ruberg (1917–1989), artist, educator
- Richard Sagrits (1910–1968), painter
- Michel Sittow (1469–1525), painter
- Ülo Sooster (1924–1970), painter
- Anton Starkopf (1889–1966), sculptor
- Aleksander Tassa (1882–1955), artist and writer
- Jaan Toomik (born 1961), painter
- Nikolai Triik (1884–1940), painter
- Teodor Ussisoo (1878–1959), furniture designer
- Helge Uuetoa (1936–2008), painter
- Aleksander Uurits (1888–1918), painter, graphic artist
- Ado Vabbe (1892–1961), painter
- Kuno Veeber (1898–1929), painter
- Edmund S. Valtman (1914–2005), cartoonist (USA)
- Annes Varjun (1907–1986), ceramic artist
- Eduard Viiralt ("Eduard Wiiralt", 1898–1954), graphic artist
- Kiino Villand (born 1969), photographer (USA)
- Ilon Wikland (born 1930), illustrator (Sweden)

== Other ==
- Mari Raamot (1872–1966), activist

== See also ==
- 100 great Estonians of the 20th century
