= Andres Siim =

Estonian architect

Andres Siim (born 25 February 1962) is an Estonian architect.

Andres Siim was born in Tallinn and studied in the National Art Institute of the Estonian SSR (today's Estonian Academy of Arts) in the department of architecture. He graduated from the institute in 1985.

Andres Siim works in the architectural bureau Siim & Kreis OÜ.

Notable works by Andres Siim are the Nissan Center in Tallinn, the main office of the Hansapank bank, and the new dormitory of the Tartu University. Andres Siim is a member of the Union of Estonian Architects.

== Works ==
- Nissan Center in Tallinn, 1994, (with Hanno Kreis)
- Tamme Stadium 1997/98 (with Kristel Ausing)
- Main office of the Hansapank bank, 1999 (with Kristel Ausing)
- Logistics center of the Kesko-Eesti, 2000
- New dormitory of the Tartu University, 2001 (with Kristel Ausing)

== See also ==
- List of Estonian architects
