= Urmas Muru =

Estonian architect & artist (born 1961)

Urmas Muru (born 27 August 1961) is an Estonian architect and artist.

== Early life ==
From 1968 to 1979, Urmas Muru studied in the 2nd Secondary School of Pärnu. From 1979, Urmas Muru studied in the State Art Institute of the Estonian SSR (today's Estonian Academy of Arts) in the department of architecture. He graduated from the institute in 1984.

== Professional career ==
From 1984 to 1985, Urmas Muru worked in the Tallinn office of the Tsentrosojuz design bureau. From 1986 to 1990, he worked in the state design bureau Eesti Tööstusprojekt (Estonian Industrial Design). In present-time, Urmas Muru works in the Muru&Pere OÜ architectural bureau.

Most notable works by Urmas Muru are the Pääsküla library, the Haabersti recreational center, numerous apartment buildings and single-family homes. His art production consists of paintings and performances. Urmas Muru is a member of the Union of Estonian Architects and the Union of Estonian Artists.

== Works ==
- Gulfoil warehouse in Laagri, 2002 (with Peeter Pere)
- Social housing in Lasnamäe, 2003 (with Peeter Pere)
- Single-family home in Kiili, 2004 (with Peeter Pere)
- Single-family home in Tabasalu, 2004 (with Peeter Pere)
- Pääsküla library, 2005 (kaasautorid Peeter Pere)
- Apartment building in Tartu, 2006 (with Peeter Pere)
- Aluminium-house, 2007 (with Peeter Pere)
- Haabersti recreational center, 2007 (with Peeter Pere)
- Summer kitchen and sauna in Southern Estonia, 2008 (with Peeter Pere, Reet Viigipuu)
- Apartment buildings in Tallinn, 2008 (with Peeter Pere, Reet Viigipuu)

== See also ==
- List of Estonian architects
