= Andri Kirsima =

Estonian architect

- Born: April 17, 1971 (age 55); Tallinn, Estonia
- Education: Tallinn University of Art
- Occupation: Architect

Andri Kirsima (born 17 April 1971, in Tallinn) is an Estonian architect.

Andri Kirsima graduated from the Department of Architecture of the Tallinn University of Art (today's Estonian Academy of Arts) in 1995.

He works in the architectural bureau Kirisma&Niineväli OÜ.

Works by Andri Kirsima include are the bus station of Rapla, Marientahl department store and office building and the Coca-Cola Plaza multiplex cinema in Tallinn. Andri Kirsima is a member of the Union of Estonian Architects.

== Works ==
- villa in Viimsi, 1997 (with Hannes Niineväli (:et))
- bus station of Rapla, 1999
- multiplex cinema, 2001
- Apartment building on Paadi Street, 2002 (with Hannes Niineväli)
- Villa in Viimsi, 2003
- Dormitory in Tallinn, 2005
- Marienthal Center, 2008 (with Hannes Niineväli)

== See also ==
- List of Estonian architects
