= Jõhvi Concert Hall =

Concert hall in Jõhvi, Estonia

- Jõhvi kontserdimaja
- Interactive map of Jõhvi Concert Hall
- Address: Pargi 40, Jõhvi, 41537 Ida-Viru maakond, Estonia
- Location: Jõhvi, Estonia
- Coordinates: 59°21′15″N 27°25′23″E

Jõhvi Concert Hall (Estonian: Jõhvi kontserdimaja) is a concert hall in Ida-Viru County, Estonia. The hall is managed by Eesti Kontsert.

The hall was opened on 8 October 2005. The hall was designed by architects Ra Luhse and Tanel Tuhal. The hall's acoustics was created by Linda Madalik.

The hall is a place where are located Cinema Amadeus, Jõhvi City Gallery, Jõhvi Music School, Jõhvi Hobby Centre and Café Noot.
