= Lõoke =

Family name

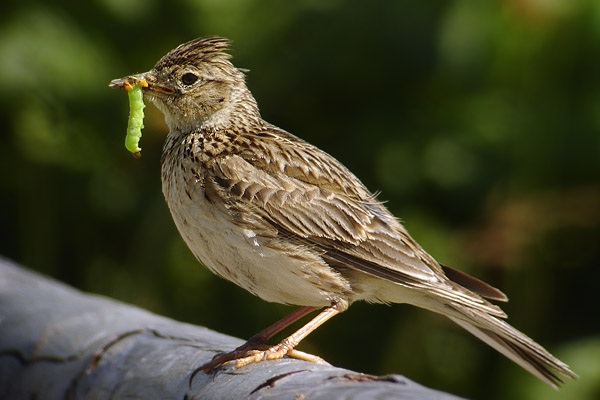

Origin
- Language: Estonian
- Meaning: lark
- Region of origin: Estonia

Lõoke is an Estonian surname meaning lark. People bearing the surname Lõoke include:

- Artur Lõoke (1909–1950), railwayman, who defected Soviet Union by escaping to Finland (:et)
- Marika Lõoke (born 1951), architect
- Urmas Lõoke (born 1950), architect
