= Andres Põime =

Estonian architect

Andres Põime (born 10 August 1957, in Tallinn) is an Estonian architect.

From 1964 to 1975 Andres Põime studied in the 2nd Secondary School of Tallinn (today's Secondary Science School of Tallinn). From 1975 he studied in the State Art Institute of the Estonian SSR (today's Estonian Academy of Arts) in the department of architecture. He graduated from the institute in 1980.

From 1980 to 1990 Andres Põime worked in the state design bureau Eesti Kommunaalprojekt (Estonian Communal Project). From 1991 to present Andres Põime has worked in the architectural bureau Studio-3 OÜ.

Most notable works by Andres Põime are the restaurant Kadriorg, apartment buildings in Nõmme and Kuressaare and the spa-hotel in Narva-Jõesuu. In addition to new projects Andres Põime has done numerous notable reconstruction projects – the old airport of Tallinn, the Russian Gymnasium etc. Andres Põime is a member of the Union of Estonian Architects.

== Works ==
- Kuressaare library, 2002 (with Tiit Kaljundi)
- Restaurant Kadriorg, 2002
- Reconstruction of the old airport of Tallinn, 2002
- Reconstruction of the Lenderi Gymnasium, 2003
- Hotel Barons, 2003
- Single-family home in Pirita, 2003
- Pirita Gymnasium, 2003
- Single-family home in Haabneeme, 2003
- Apartment building in Nõmme, 2004
- Apartment building in Kuressaare, 2007
- Reconstruction of the old army structures in Tondi, 2007

== See also ==
- List of Estonian architects
