= Velle =

Velle may refer to:

== Places ==
- Velle, Møre og Romsdal, a village in Ørsta municipality in Møre og Romsdal county, Norway
- Velle, Trøndelag (also Velde or Vellamelen), a village in Steinkjer municipality in Trøndelag county, Norway
- Velle, Rogaland, a village in Karmøy municipality in Rogaland county, Norway
- Velle reservoir, a reservoir on the Minho River in Galicia, Spain
- Velle-le-Châtel, a commune in Haute-Saône department, France
- Velle-sur-Moselle, a commune in Meurthe-et-Moselle department, France

== People ==
- Gaston Velle (1868–1953), a French filmmaker
- Marit Velle Kile (born 1978), a Norwegian actress appearing in film and television
- Weiert Velle (1925–2007), a Norwegian veterinarian
- William E. Tou Velle (1862–1951), a United States Representative from Ohio
- Velle Kadalipp (born 1963), an Estonian architect

== Other ==
- Velle (film), a 2021 Hindi-language crime comedy film
- Velle derrick, a lifting device, particularly one used on oil fields

== See also ==
- Velles (disambiguation)
