= St. Elizabeth's Church, Pärnu =

St. Elizabeth's Church
- Eliisabeti kirik
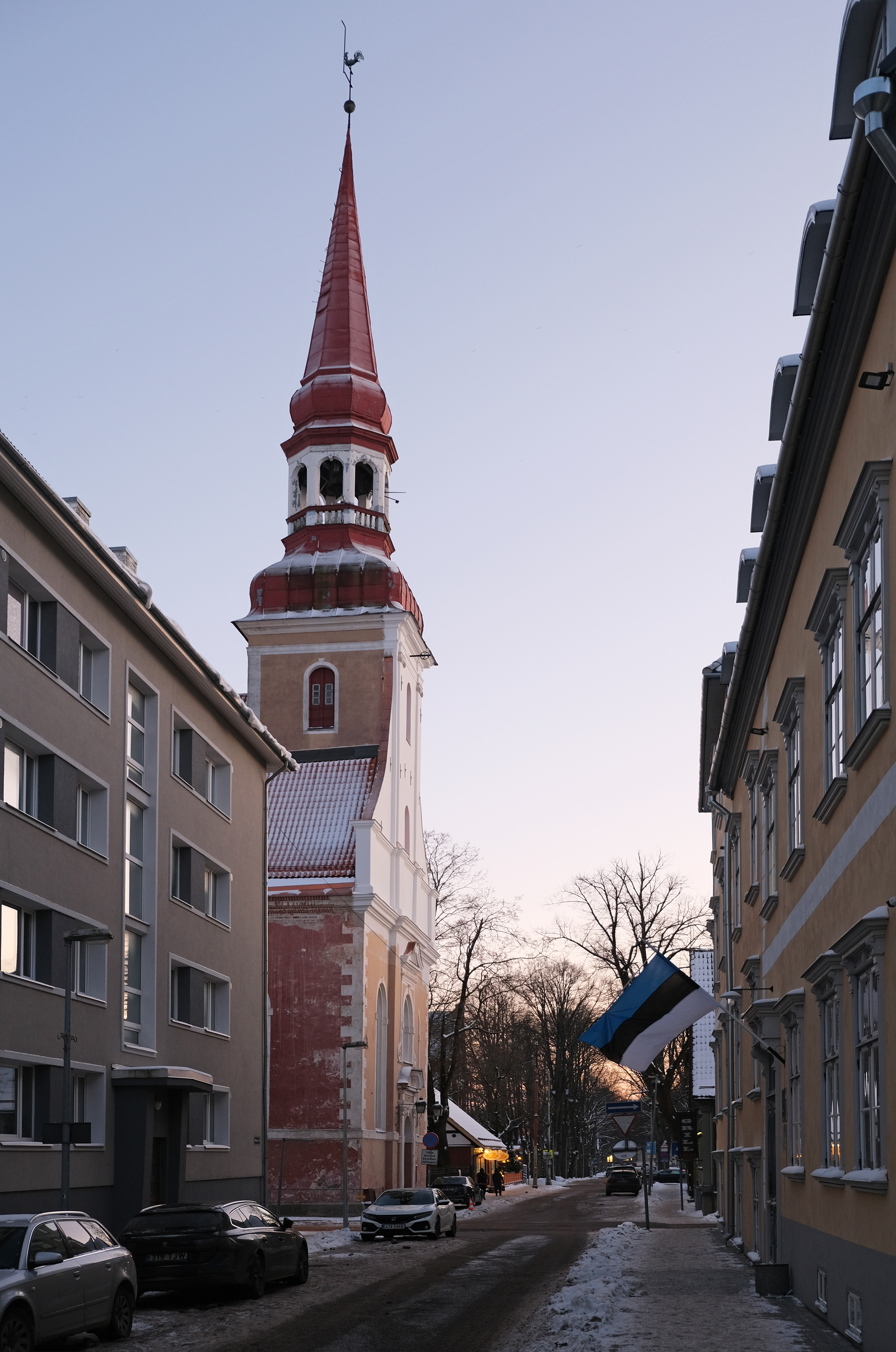
- St. Elizabeth's Church in Nikolai street, Pärnu
- St. Elizabeth's Church
- 58°23′1.1″N 24°30′0″E
- Location: Nikolai 22, Pärnu, Estonia
- Country: Estonia
- Denomination: Lutheran

History
- Founded: 1741
- Consecrated: 1747

Architecture
- Architect(s): J. H. Güterbock (main building); J. H. Wülbern (spire); Häuserman (1893 extension); Ra Luhse (1995 extension)

St. Elizabeth's Church (Estonian: Eliisabeti kirik) is a Lutheran church in Pärnu, Estonia. Built between 1744 and 1747, it is an example of baroque ecclesiastical architecture in Estonia.

== History ==
The church was founded in 1741, when Russian empress Elizabeth of Russia donated 8,000 roubles for the construction of a new Lutheran church in Pärnu. The church was named after the empress. Construction began in 1744 and the building was completed in 1747 under the guidance of master builder J. H. Güterbock from Riga.

The spire was finished in 1750 and designed by J. H. Wülbern, who also designed the spire for St. Peter's Church, Riga.

In 1893, architect Häuserman from Riga designed the neo-Gothic interior decoration and the south transept. In 1995, a further extension was added to the church, designed by Estonian architect Ra Luhse.

== Architecture and interior ==
The church is a baroque building characterised by relatively grand proportions and simplicity of decoration.

The altarpiece depicts the resurrection and was made in Rotterdam, Netherlands, in 1854.

The organ was built in 1929 by H. Kolbe of Riga.
