= Raivo Kotov =

Estonian architect

Raivo Kotov (born 11 October 1976 in Viljandi) is an Estonian architect.

From 1995 to 2000 Raivo Kotov studied in the Department of Architecture and City Planning of the Estonian Academy of Arts.

Raivo Kotov works in the architectural bureau KOKO Arhitektid OÜ.

Notable works by Raivo Kotov are the Expo 2000 Estonian pavilion in Hannover, the apartment building on Vabriku street, the Fahle building and the Metro Plaza office building in the centre of Tallinn. Raivo Kotov is a member of the Union of Estonian Architects.

== Works ==
- Estonian Pavilion, EXPO2000 Hannover, 2000 (with Andrus Kõresaar)
- City Hotel Burninieks, 2003 (with Üla Koppel, Andrus Kõresaar)
- Georg Ots SPA Hotel in Kuressaare, 2004 (with Üla Koppel, Andrus Kõresaar)
- Villa in Kuressaare, 2005
- Apartment building in Vabriku Street, 2005 (with Tõnis Kimmel)
- Fahle House, 2006 (with Andrus Kõresaar)
- Arensburg hotel, 2007 (with Margit Aule, Lea Laidra)
- Kuldala housing area, 2008 (with Lembit-Kaur Stöör, Margus Maiste, Tõnis Kimmel, Olga Batuhtina, Margit Aule)
- Office building in Rotermanni Quarter, 2008 (with Andrus Kõresaar)
- Metro Plaza office building, 2008 (with Lembit-Kaur Stöör, Andrus Kõresaar)

== Competitions ==
- EXPO 2000, 1999, I prize
- Monument of Freedom, 2002, II prize
- Arensburg hotel 2005; I prize
- Embassy of Estonian Republic in Riga, 2008; purchase
- Extension of the Estonian University of Life Sciences, 2008; purchase

== Awards ==
Kotov was nominated for a nunber of architectural awards and received several of them.

- Estonian Cultural Endowment for Architecture Award:
  - 2000
  - 2006
  - 2018: for Baltic Station Market (Estonian: Balti Jaama Turg), team award
- 2015: Young Architect Award of the Estonian Architects' Association
- Estonian Architecture Award
  - 2023: Estonian Association of Interior Architects award: for Tabasalu Primary School and sports building (team award)
