= Velle Kadalipp =

Estonian architect (born 1963)

Velle Kadalipp (born 25 March 1963 in Viljandi) is an Estonian architect.

From 1981 Kadalipp studied in the State Art Institute of Estonian SSR in the department of architecture. He graduated from the institute in 1986.

From 1986 to 1993 Velle Kadalipp worked in the state design office Estonian Industrial Design. From 1993 to 1997 he worked in the architectural bureau Entec AS. Between 1997 and 1999 Velle Kadalipp worked as a freelance architect. Since 1999 Velle Kadalipp has worked in the JVR OÜ Architectural Bureau.

Velle Kadalipp is a member of Union of Estonian Architects.

== Works ==
- planning for the Kehtna Parish, 1994
- planning for the city of Kilingi-Nõmme, 1996
- reconstruction of Türi street 10, 1999 (with Kalle Vellevoog)
- detail planning of Seedri and Remmelga street in Pärnu, 2000 (with Kalle Vellevoog)
- apartment building on Kaupmehe street, 2004 (with Kalle Vellevoog)
- apartment buildings on Pähkli street, 2005 (with Kalle Vellevoog)
- apartment building on Tatari street, 2005 (with Kalle Vellevoog)
- apartment building on Luige street, 2005 (with Kalle Vellevoog)
- office and apartment building in Jõhvi, 2006 (with Kalle Vellevoog)

== Competitions ==
- Library in Jõhvi, 1990 (with Ilmar Jalas, Kalle Vellevoog); 1. prize
- Dormitory of the Tartu University, 2000 (with Ilmar Jalas, Kalle Vellevoog, Enn Rajasaar); purchase
- apartment building on Kaupmehe street, 2001 (with Kalle Vellevoog, Ott Kadarik, Enn Rajasaar); 1 prize
- extension of the Pärnu Old Town Secondary School, 2001; 3. prize
- Spa in Kuressaare, 2002 (kaasautor Kalle Vellevoog); 2. prize
