= Kalle Vellevoog =

Estonian architect (born 1963)

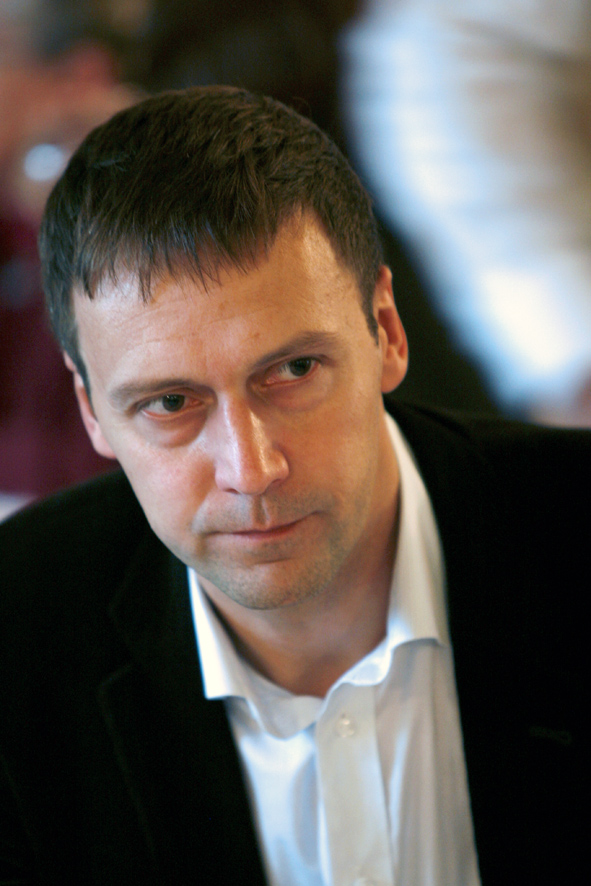
- Vellevoog in 2007
- Born: 14 April 1963 (age 63); Tallinn, Estonian SSR (now Tallinn, Estonia)
- Occupation: Architect

Kalle Vellevoog (born 14 April 1963) is an Estonian architect.

Vellevoog was born in Tallinn. He studied in the State Art Institute of the Estonian SSR (now Estonian Academy of Arts) in the department of architecture. He graduated from the academy in 1986. From that year to 1990, Vellevoog worked in the Tallinn office of the Soviet design bureau Tsentrosojuz Projekt. Since 1990, Vellevoog has worked at the architectural bureau JVR OÜ.

Most notable works by Vellevoog are the housing area of Seedri Street in Pärnu, alongside the apartment buildings on Kaupmehe Street, Pähkli Street, and on Seedri Street. Vellevoog is a member of the Union of Estonian Architects, and from 1998 to 2002, was the chairman of the union, and in 2002 to 2004, the vice chairman.

== Works ==
- Apartment building on Suur-Patarei street, 1998
- Office building on Türi Street, 1999 (with Velle Kadalipp)
- Private houses on Seedri Street in Pärnu, 2003
- Apartment building on Kaupmehe Street, 2004 (with Velle Kadalipp)
- Apartment building in Pärnu, 2004
- Housing area in Tallinn, 2005 (with Velle Kadalipp)
- Apartment building on Tatari Street, 2005 (with Velle Kadalipp)
- Apartment building in Haapsalu, 2006
- Office building in Tallinn, 2006
- Apartment building on Seedri Street in Pärnu, 2007
