= Hellat =

Hellat is a surname. Notable people with the surname include:

- Aleksander Hellat (1881–1943), Estonian politician
- Georg Hellat (1870–1943), Estonian architect
