= Emil Urbel =

Estonian architect

- Occupation: Architect

Emil Urbel (born 13 November 1959 in Pärnu) is an Estonian architect.

Emil Urbel studied in the State Art Institute of the Estonian SSR (today's Estonian Academy of Arts) in the department of architecture. He graduated from the institute in 1982.

From 1984 to 1989 Emil Urbel worked in the state design bureau Eesti Projekt (Estonian National Design). From 1989 to 2000 he worked in the architectural bureau Urbel&Peil OÜ. From 2000 to present he works in the architectural bureau Emil Urbel OÜ.

Emil Urbel is most notable for his numerous single-family homes. Most notable public buildings by Emil Urbel are the Rocca Al Mare School, the Kalev Spa and the Flour Mill building in the Rotermanni Quarter. For the Rocca Al Mare School building Emil Urbel received the annual award if the Estonian Cultural Endowment in 2000. Emil Urbel is a member of the Union of Estonian Architects.

He, and some of his buildings, featured in the Jonathan Meades BBC programme "Magnetic North". (2008).

== Works ==
- Terminal A of the Tallinn Passengers' Harbour, 1994 (with Ülo Peil)
- Hotell Central, 1994
- Villa in Tabasalu, 1996
- Estonian Law Institute 2000
- Rocca al Mare School, 2000 (with Ülo Peil, Indrek Erm)
- Aaviku housing area, 2003 (with Indrek Erm)
- Restaurant Novell, 2004
- Viinistu art museum, 2004
- Villa in Miiduranna, 2004 (with Indrek Erm)
- row housing on Esku Street, 2004
- Kalev Spa, 2005
- Frlour Mill in the Rotermanni Quarter, 2008 (with Ainar Luik)
- Nordea House, 2009 (with Indrek Erm)
