= Jaak Huimerind =

Estonian architect

- Born: 4 May 1957 (age 67); Tartu, Estonia

Jaak Huimerind (born 4 May 1957) is an Estonian architect.

From 1975 Huimerind studied in the State Art Institute of Estonian SSR in the department of architecture. He graduated from the institute in 1980.

From 1980 to 1987 Huimerind worked in the state design office Eesti Kommunaalprojekt (Estonian Communal Design). From 1987 to 1993 he worked in the concern ESTAR-PREEV. At the moment Jaak Huimerind works at the Studio Paralleel OÜ architectural bureau.

Most notable works by Huimerind are Järve Center and the Lohusalu Cafe. In addition he is the author of numerous single-family homes around Estonia.

Jaak Huimerind is a member of the Union of Estonian Architects.

== Works ==
- Lohusalu Cafe, 1997
- single-family home in Nõmme, 1999
- Office of the Ministry of Justice of Estonia in Kuressaare, 2000
- Järve Center, 2000, (with Indrek Saarepera, Mari Kurismaa)
- AS Linette office building in Tallinn, 2001 (with Mari Kurismaa)
- Single-family home in Pärnumaa, 2003 (with Tiina Kull)
- Extension of Järve Center, 2003, (with Indrek Saarepera, Mari Kurismaa)
- Single-family home near Tallinn, 2007
- center of logistics in Lasnamäe, 2006 (with Anne Kose, Kertu Kaldaru)
- apartment building on Komeedi street, 2006 (with Anne Kose, Mari Kurismaa)
- center of logistics in Peetri, 2007 (with Andres Lember, Tiiu Truus, Liisa Põime)
- single-family home in Nõmme, 2007
