= Tõnu Laigu =

Estonian architect (born 1956)

Tõnu Laigu (born 14 February 1956, in Tallinn) is an Estonian architect.

From 1963 to 1974 Tõnu Laigu studied in the 46th Secondary School of Tallinn (today's Pelgulinna Gymnasium of Tallinn). From 1975 Tõnu Laigu studied in the State Art Institute of the Estonian SSR (today's Estonian Academy of Arts) in the department of architecture. He graduated from the institute in 1979.

From 1979 to 1989 Tõnu Laigu worked in the state design bureau Eesti Kommunaalprojekt (Estonian Communal Design). From 1989 to 1990 he worked in the architectural bureau E-Stuudio OÜ and from 1990 to 2001 in the architectural bureau Kuup OÜ. From 2001 Tõnu Laigu works in the architectural bureau QP Arhitektid OÜ.

Most notable works by Tõnu Laigu are the apartment building on the Sõpruse road, the logistics center of the COAL company and the new apartment building on the Mäepealse street. Tõnu Laigu is a member of the Union of Estonian Architects and belongs to the board of the union.

== Works ==
- Single-family home in Tallinn, 1989
- Apartment building in Narva, 1989
- Kose Secondary School, 1990
- Apartment building in Tallinn, 2000
- Single-family home Nõmme, 2002
- Apartment building on Sõpruse road, 2003
- Duplex in Nõmme, 2004
- AS COAL logistics center, 2005
- Single-family home Nõmme, 2005
- Athletics hall of Pärnu, 2006
- Apartment buildings on Mäepealse Street, 2008

== Competitions ==
- Modern Art Museum of Helsinki, 1993
- Western Entrance of the Tallinn Zoo, 2005; II Prize
- Kihnu Harbour, 2005; II prize
- Tabasalu center, 2007; I prize
- Sports hall of the Lyceé Francais in Tallinn, 2007; I prize
