= Margit Mutso =

Estonian architect

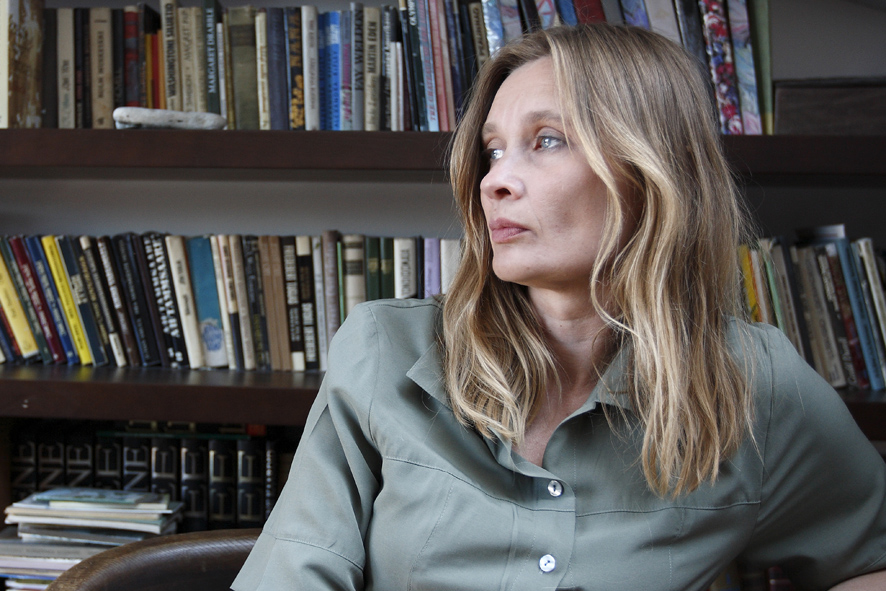
Margit Mutso in 2008

Margit Mutso (born 11 February 1966) is an Estonian architect.

Margit Mutso was born in Tallinn. She studied in the State Art Institute of the Estonian SSR (today's Estonian Academy of Arts) in the department of architecture. She graduated from the institute in 1989.

From 1989 to 1990 Margit Mutso worked in the state design bureau Eesti Kommunaalprojekt (Estonian Communal Design). From 1990 to 1992 she worked in the architectural bureau V. Suonmaa in Finland. From 1993 to 1995 Margit Mutso worked in the architectural bureau of the Tartu city government. From 1995 to present she works in the architectural bureau Eek&Mutso OÜ. From 2004 to 2005 she was the chairman of the Union of Estonian Architects.

Most notable works by Margit Mutso are the bus station of Rakvere, apartment building on Tatari street and the apartment building on Noole street. Margit Mutso is a member of the Union of Estonian Architects.

== Works ==
- reconstruction of Villa Lindgren, 1998 (with Madis Eek)
- Rakvere bus station, 2000 (with Madis Eek)
- Villa Känd in Tiskre, Tallinn, 2002 (with Madis Eek)
- Apartment building on Sakala Street, 2003 (with Madis Eek)
- Haapsalu swimming pool, 2003 (with Madis Eek, Reio Avaste)
- Apartment building on Õle Street, Tallinn, 2004 (with Madis Eek)
- Villa Mody in Tabasalu, 2004
- Olerex gas station in Tallinn, 2005 (with Madis Eek)
- Apartment building in Tartu, 2005
- Apartment building on Noole Street, 2007 (with Kristi Põldme)
