= Karl Tarvas =

Estonian architect

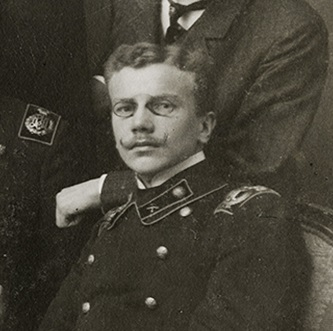
- Born: 19 April 1885; Tallinn
- Died: 26 December 1975 (aged 90); Tallinn
- Other name: until 1940 Karl Treumann
- Education: Riga Polytechnic Institute
- Occupation: Architect

Karl Tarvas (until 1940 Karl Treumann; 19 April 1885 in Tallinn – 26 December 1975 in Tallinn) was an Estonian architect. Karl Tarvas graduated as an architect from Riga Polytechnic Institute in 1915.

During World War I he worked on building shore batteries, and from 1919 to 1923 he became director of shore battery construction. From 1923 to 1926 he worked as an architect in Harju County, Estonia, and proceeded to work as a freelance architect in an independent office until 1940.

He designed many buildings in the suburbs of Tallinn, particularly two-story houses with stone stairwells, and stone apartment buildings. He also designed Viinistu Elementary School and the church on the island of Naissaar.

In 1921 15 architects, including Karl Tarvas, founded the Association of Estonian Architects.

== Career ==
Karl Tarvas differed from others of his time by designing vernacular architecture for the middle class. He designed mainly 2- and 3-storey residential buildings in Tallinn, being a true professional in his area. Tarvas planned houses skilfully and thoughtfully. Lots of his works are found on the streets of Tallinn. His buildings are well-executed and highly valued.

== Tallinn House ==
ikenberg house at 19 Liivalaia in Tallinn. Designed in 1929 by Karl Tarvas.

Tarvas was active mainly in the 1920–1930s, when the opportunity to take a construction loan, provided the architect with work. He mainly designed two- or three-storey apartment buildings for the peripheral areas of Tallinn, which are so typical of Pelgulinn, Kalamaja and Kadriorg landscapes today. As a further development of the lender's house type, the houses with wood flooring and the staircase with central silicate tiles became site-specifically called as Tallinn-type houses. This type of building remained an undisputed favorite of the architect. The Tallinn House was not a professionally designed standard project, it was the outcome of local building regulations and construction techniques in everyday practice, that would be suitable for the poorer population as well. That type of house was inherent in the designs of engineers and technicians. This makes Karl Tarvas a unique architect who is consciously orienting for housing for the poorer citizens, doing so very well. The Tallinn House was both socially and architecturally conservative in its time. The spread of stone stairwells was due to the new fire regulations that required two wooden stairwells or one made of stone. The Tallinn type buildings have features of traditionalist, functionalist and Art Nouveau style.

- Kauba 11 (1928)
- Aadamsoni 5a (1929)
- Koidu 68b (1929)
- Alle 5 (1931)
- Kodu 24 (1931)
- Salme 22 (1929, 1933)
- Kungla 22 (1932)
- Wiedemanni 11 (1932)
- Salme 15/ Tõllu 8 (1932)
- Laulupeo 7 (1932)
- Valgevase 10 (1931, 1935)
- Jakobi 16 (1936)
- Tehnika 127 (1936)
- Köleri 26 (1938)
- Heina 49 (1939)

== Traditionalist House ==
In the 1921s, many buildings were erected with the main characteristics of rational traditionalism.

Kopli was the most important industrial area in Tallinn, that achieved its final shape just before World War I. At the tip of the peninsula was the Russian-Baltic Shipyard (1912–1916) and the Bekker Plant (1912–1914) on the Kopli Bay. Between 1939 and 1941, architects Roman Koolmar and Karl Tarvas built 28 double houses in Kopli, Sirbi street, creating Kopliranna garden city between the Bekker industrial plant and cemetery. They followed the example of German social architecture and built type IV 1,5 storey twin houses. Type I and II have two apartments where the living room and kitchen are downstairs and the top floor has two bedrooms. Type III has larger rooms. Type II and IV have four apartments with a living room, bedroom and kitchen. However, the planned cross-street never got finished due to the outbreak of war. Buildings are traditional houses with their simple decor and gable roof. Common to the 1930s social architecture.

- Aasa 5 (1929)
- Liivalaia 19 (1929)
- Weizenbergi 21 (1930)
- Kentmanni 19 (1932)
- Double houses in Sirbi street with architect R. Koolmariga (1939–1941)

== Functionalist House ==
Functionalism predominated in Estonia in the 1930s, and its best examples are located in Pärnu, thanks to the architect Olev Siinmaa. However, features of functionalism are also found in Karl Tarvas's work. In the middle of the 1930s, the areas of the Tallinn Houses were more criticized than before because they did not have the right garden cities and favored the spreading out of the city. From 1935, the development of Tallinn type houses continued, and since then Tarvas has designed Tallinn houses with functionalistic features: a smooth stone facade, a flat roof and wide windows. They were mainly three-storey houses with one stairwell.

- Roosikrantsi 8c (1931–1932)
- Sinika 8 (1937)
- Vesivärava 46 (1938)
- V. Reimani 4 (1938)
- Aedvilja 4 (1938)
- Heina 53 (1938)
- Tatari 29 (1938)
- Raua 31 (1932–1936)

== Representative Traditionalism ==
During the time of Konstantin Päts, a great deal of emphasis was placed on the representativeness of the buildings, based on more general architectural traditions.

- Kapi 1 and 2 (1934–1935)
- L. Koidula 3 (1937)
- Pronksi 5 (1938)
- Koidula 3 (1937–38, 1961)

== More examples of his work ==
His main focus was in residential architecture, but he also designed community buildings, for example, Hans Kubu's private high school Imanta 6 (1927), Viinistu primary school (1928), Naissaare church (1933), and fire brigade building Jakobi 21 (1939). Tarvas, who worked as an architect in Harju County, designed elementary schools for Viimsi (1925–1927, the Museum of the Rannarahva) and for Viinistu (completed 1928), where he sought to create spaciousness with big windows and there were no excessive decor.

He also made many smaller projects as a private architect. Tarvas received the most offers to design lofts and in the second half of 1930s, Tarvas’s office released 30 projects in a month. Thus, he has been engaged in lining the house (Veerenni 17 and Rohu 7 houses) and the construction of roof (Mulla 6, Kalevi 38, Kalevi 31, Valgevase 12, Lai 4, Kungla 18 and more).

Many people left Estonia during the war, and the list of local architects dropped considerably. However, Karl Tarvas remained in Estonia during the German occupation and the Soviet Union. During the liberal Stalinism in the second half of the 1940s, Karl Tarvas's 8-apartment house type was the most commonly used project, similar to the pre-war "Tallinn House" and the 1920s traditionalism. The curved borders of the stairwell balcony above the front door resemble the legacy of the baroque period. Apart from the difficult period of Stalinism, this project, created by the architect, was still widely used. After war, typical residential projects were started by series, with different standard projects with common planning and construction elements.

Since 1949 to 1962 he worked in the Estonian project.

In 2010, Sandra Mälk curated an exhibition "Karl Tarvas 125" at the Estonian Architecture Museum in which the curator compiled a comprehensive list of the works of Tarvas, available in the archives of the Estonian Architecture Museum. Here are some examples of Tarvas's works, all of which are located in Tallinn:

- Ristiku 13 (1924)
- Kodu 8 (1925)
- Herne 18 (1926)
- Telliskivi 40/ Rohu 10 (1927)
- Tartu 53/ Kreutzwaldi 31 (1928)
- Weizenbergi 15 and 21 (1929)
- Nõmme-Jase 30 (1929–1930)
- Vana-Lõuna 13 (1920s)
- Kose tee 30 (1929–1930)
- Kauna 5 (1930–1931)
- Vilmsi 20 (1930)
- Köleri 26 (1931)
- Köleri 30 (1931)
- Saturni 7 (1931)
- Karu 7 (1932)
- Magasini 13 (1932)
- Jakobi 27 (1934)
- Koidula 9 (1935)
- Koidula 3/Jakobsoni 60 (1935–1936)
- Odra 12 (1936)
- Tööstuse 9 (1936)
- Tartu mnt 81 (1936)
- Pronksi 5 (1936)
- Volta 32 (1937)
- Juhkentali 46 (1937)
- Magasini 3g (1937)
- Raua 31 (1937)
- Tartu mnt 71 (1937)
- Tehnika 20 (1937)
- Väike-Ameerika 20 (1938)
- Pärnu mnt 124 (1939)

== Personal life ==
His sons Peeter Tarvas, Paul Tarvas, and Pärtel Tarvas all became architects.
