= Ülar Mark =

Estonian architect

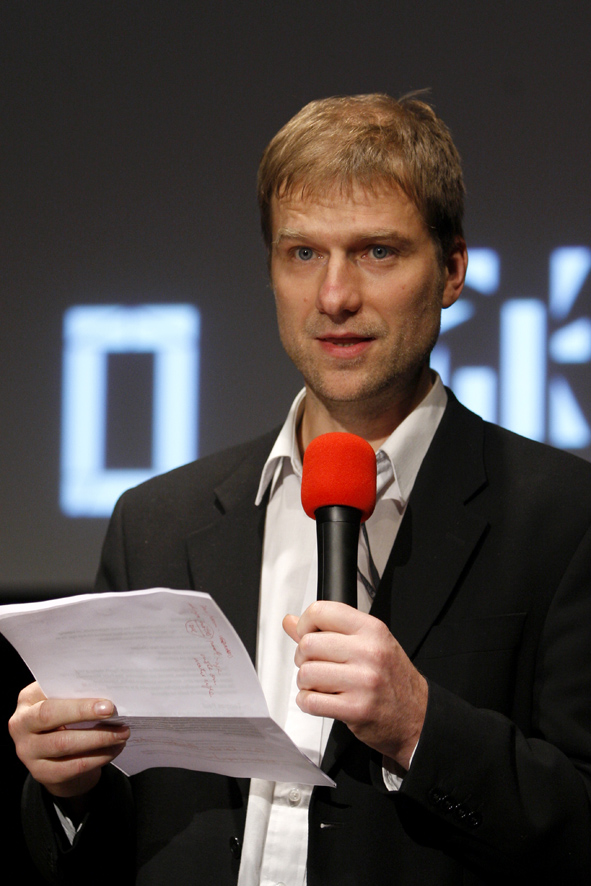
Ülar Mark (2008)

Ülar Mark (born 12 February 1968) is an Estonian architect.

He graduated from the Department of Architecture of the Tallinn University of Art (today's Estonian Academy of Arts) in 1995.

From 1999 to 2002, Mark worked as the chief architect of the city of Narva. Since 2002, Mark has worked in the architectural bureau Urban Mark OÜ.

Mark is a member of the Union of Estonian Architects and from 2006 to 2007 was the chairman of the union. From 2009 to 2013 Ülar Mark worked as the chairman of the Estonian Center of Architecture. From 2009, Mark is the partner of Allianss Architects OÜ. From 2015, Head Architect and Founder of Kodasema, the architecture, design and engineering firm that creates and builds innovative living and housing solutions.

Notable works by Mark are the gallery of the Bank of Estonia, the Tallink Spa Hotel and the new railway station of Tartu, and KODA by Kodasema housing concept. In addition, Mark has designed numerous urban and planning projects in Estonia and abroad.

Mark had been in a long-term relationship with singer and actress Kärt Tomingas for many years until her death in 2025. The couple has a daughter, Roberta. He currently lives in Lääne-Viru County. Mark has also a son Ailan Daniel from the previous marriage.

== Works ==
- Single-family home on Silgu Street, 2002
- Eurovision 2002 stage design
- Gallery of the Bank of Estonia, 2004
- project Joint Space for the Architectural Biennale of Venice, 2006
- Detail plan of the Fortuna quarter in Tartu, 2006–2007
- Hotel Haanja, 2007
- Ugandi Spa hotel, 2007
- New train station of Tartu, 2008
- Tallink Spa hotel, 2008

== Competitions ==
- Fortuna quarter in Tartu, 2003; I prize
- planning competition of Seewald, 2005
- planning competition of the Koidu settlement, 2006
- planning competition of the Maakri quarter in Tallinn, 2006
- Joint office building of ministries, 2007
- Embassy of Estonian Republic in Riga, 2007
- New train station of Tartu, 2008; I prize
