= Urmas Lõoke =

Estonian architect

Urmas Lõoke (born 12 November 1950, in Tartu) is an Estonian architect.

Urmas Lõoke studied in the State Art Institute of the Estonian SSR (today's Estonian Academy of Arts) in the department of architecture. He graduated from the institute in 1975.

Urmas Lõoke works in the architectural bureau Lõokese Ummi Arhitektuuribüroo OÜ.

Notable works by Urmas Lõoke are the office building of the company Transgroup Invest and the main building of the Estonian Railway. Urmas Lõoke is the member of the Union of Estonian Architects.

== Works ==
- EMT technological center in Tallinn
- Transgroup Invest office building
- Main building of the Estonian Railway

== Sources ==
- Union of Estonian Architects
- Architectural Bureau Urmas Lõokese Arhitektuuribüroo OÜ, works
