= Jüri Okas =

Estonian architect (born 1950)

Jüri Okas (born 26 August 1950 in Tallinn) is an Estonian architect, installation artist, and printmaker.

From 1957 to 1968, Okas attended Tallinn Secondary School No. 46 (today's Pelgulinn High School). From 1968 to 1970 he studied at the Tallinn Polytechnic Institute (today's Tallinn Technical University). In 1970, Okas enrolled in the State Art Institute of the Estonian SSR (today's Estonian Academy of Arts) in the architecture department. He graduated from the institute in 1974.

From 1974 to 1989, Okas worked in the design bureau EKE Projekt. From 1989 he has worked in the architectural bureau Okas&Lõoke OÜ.

The most notable works by Okas are the gas station in Paide, the main building of Forekspank bank, the modern farm in Saaremaa, and the Delta Plaza office building in Tallinn.

Artistic creations by Okas include numerous performances, photo collages, prints, installations, book designs, and sculptures. Exhibitions of his works have been held in many Estonian and Finnish galleries, and his works have been part of exhibitions in Estonia, Latvia, Lithuania, Finland, Sweden, Germany, Italy, Spain, Canada, and Scotland.

Jüri Okas is the son of the painter Evald Okas.

== Works ==
- Astlanda business center, 1992 (unbuilt, with Marika Lõoke)
- Main office of the Forekspank bank, 1997 (with Marika Lõoke)
- Estconde business center, 1999 (with Marika Lõoke)
- Office building in the city center of Tallinn, 2001 (with Marika Lõoke)
- Modern farm in Saaremaa, 2002
- Apartment building on Kaarli Road, 2004 (with Marika Lõoke)
- Apartment building on Rävala Road, 2005 (with Marika Lõoke)
- Delta Plaza business center, 2008 (with Marika Lõoke)

== Art ==
- Reconstruction O, print, 1974
- Reconstruction M, print, 1976
- Environment, installation, 1976, Tallinn
- Untitled, land art, 1979, Vääna-Jõesuu
- Perspective, installation, 1979, Harku
- Landscape II, print, 1982
- Torn I, sügavtrükk, 1986
- Nest, installation, 1987, Tallinn
- Cross-roads, installation, 1995, Tartu
- Drench to Heaven, installation, 1996, Rostock
