= Tõnis Kimmel =

Estonian architect (born 1977)

Tõnis Kimmel (born 22 January 1977 in Tallinn) is an Estonian architect.

From 1984 to 1992 Tõnis Kimmel studied in the 7th Secondary School of Tallinn (today's Tallinn English College) and from 1992 to 1995 in the King Gustav Adolf's Grammar School. From 1995 he studied in the Estonian Academy of Arts in the department of architecture and city planning. He graduated from the academy in 2002.

From 2002 to 2006, Tõnis Kimmel worked in the architectural bureau KOKO arhitektid OÜ. From 2005 Tõnis Kimmel works in the Tartu city government in the department of architecture. Most notable works by Tõnis Kimmel are the apartment building on the Vabriku Street and the new synagogue of Tallinn. For the new synagogue of Tallinn Tõnis Kimmel received the annual architectural award of the Estonian Cultural Endowment in 2006.

== Works ==
- furniture factory of Neiser, 2000 (with Indrek Näkk)
- reconstruction of an apartment building in Tallinn, 2003 (with Raivo Kotov)
- apartment building on Vabriku Street, 2005 (with Raivo Kotov)
- single-family home in Haaslava village, 2006 (with Merje Müürisepp)
- New Synagogue of Tallinn, 2006 (with Lembit-Kaur Stöör)
- open air exhibition of art on the walls of apartment blocks in Annelinn in Tartu, 2009
