= Enn Rajasaar =

Estonian architect (born 1961)

Enn Rajasaar (born 8 November 1961 in Tartu) is an Estonian architect.

Enn Rajasaar studied in the State Art Institute of the Estonian SSR (today's Estonian Academy of Arts) in the department of architecture. He graduated from the institute in 1985.

From 1985 to 1990 Enn Rajasaar worked in the Tallinn office of the soviet design bureau Tsentrosojuz Projekt. From 1990 he has worked in the architectural bureau JVR OÜ.

Notable part of projects by Enn Rajasaar are various apartment buildings and single-family houses. In addition he has participated successfully in numerous architectural competitions. Enn Rajasaar is a member of the Union of Estonian Architects.

== Works ==
- AS Maseko office building, 1998
- Reconstruction of an apartment building, 2000
- International style housing in Tabasalu, 2002
- Apartment building on Weizenbergi Street, 2005
- Apartment building on Köleri Street, 2005
- Apartment buildings on Roheline Aas Street, 2006
- Apartment building with offices on Narva road, 2007
- Row housing on Särje street, 2008
