= Ra Luhse =

Estonian architect (born 1964)

Ra Luhse (born August 30, 1964, in Pärnu) is an Estonian architect.

He studied in the State Art Institute of the Estonian SSR (today's Estonian Academy of Arts) in the department of architecture. He graduated from the institute in 1987.

From 1987 to 1991 Ra Luhse worked in the Pärnu office of the design bureau EKE Projekt. From 1994 he works in the architectural bureau Luhse&Tuhal OÜ.

Notable works by Ra Luhse are the Concert Hall in Jõhvi, the Benedictine monastery in Pirita and apartment buildings in Pärnu and Rakvere. Ra Luhse is a member of the Union of Estonian Architects and a member of the board of the union.

== Works ==
- Extension of the Kuressaare church, 1992
- Pärnu College, 1997
- Benedictine monastery in Pirita, 2001
- Beach café in Pärnu, 2002
- Jõhvi Concert Hall, 2005
- Extension of the Russian Theatre, 2006
- Gran Rose Spa, 2006
- Kindergarten in Jüri, 2008

== Competitions ==
- National Museum of Estonia, 1993 (with Tanel Tuhal); I prize
- Housing and business quarter on the bank of Pärnu river, 2007; I prize
