= Tanel Tuhal =

Estonian architect (born 1967)

Tanel Tuhal (born 25 June 1967 in Pärnu) is a notable Estonian architect.

He graduated from the Department of Architecture of the State Art Institute of the Estonian SSR (today's Estonian Academy of Arts) in 1992.

Tanel Tuhal works in the architectural bureau Luhse&Tuhal OÜ.

Notable works by Tanel Tuhal include the new monastery of Pirita, the Concert Hall of Jõhvi, the apartment buildings in Lehe street and the extension of the Russian Theatre in Tallinn. Tanel Tuhal is a member of the Union of Estonian Architects.

== Works ==
- Pärnu College, 1997
- 123 gas station, 2000
- Benedictine monastery in Pirita, 2001
- Beach café in Pärnu, 2002
- Apartment building in Kuressaare, 2003
- Jõhvi Concert Hall, 2005
- Apartment building in Rakvere, 2005
- Apartment buildings on Papli Street, 2005
- Extension of the Russian Theatre, 2006
- Gran Rose Spa, 2006
- Apartment building on Tedre Street, 2007
- Apartment building on Lehe Street, 2007
- Kindergarten in Jüri, 2008

== See also ==
- List of Estonian architects
