= Peeter Pere =

Estonian architect and artist

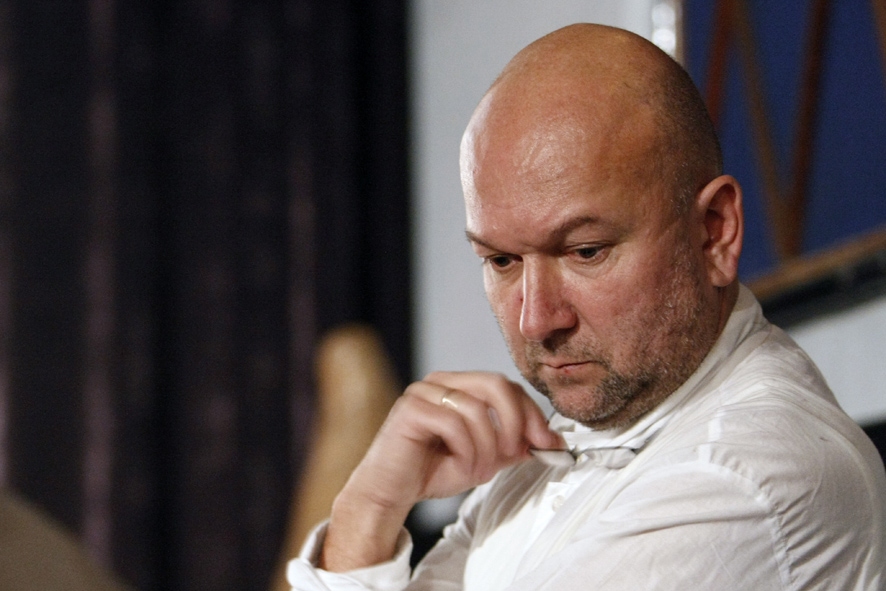
Portrait of Peeter Pere (2010)

Peeter Pere (born 15 June 1957 in Tartu) is a notable Estonian architect and artist.

From 1975 Peeter Pere studied at the National Art Institute of the Estonian SSR (today's Estonian Academy of Arts) in the department of architecture. He graduated from the institute in 1980.

From 1980 to 1993, Peeter Pere worked in the state design bureau Eesti Tööstusprojekt (Estonian Industrial Design). From 1994, he has worked in the architectural bureaus F&P, Muru&Pere and as a freelance architect.

The most notable works by Peeter Pere are the library of Pääsküla, the recreational center of Haabersti, social housing in Lasnamäe and the apartment building in Maarjamäe. In addition, Peeter Pere has successfully participated in numerous architectural competitions. His art creations include paintings and installations. Peeter Pere is a member of the Union of Estonian Architects.

== Works ==
- Gulfoil warehouse in Laagri, 2002 (with Urmas Muru)
- Social housing in Lasnamäe, 2003 (with Urmas Muru)
- Single-family home in Kiili, 2004 (with Urmas Muru)
- Single-family home in Tabasalu, 2004 (with Urmas Muru)
- Pääsküla library, 2005 (kaasautorid Urmas Muru)
- Apartment building in Tartu, 2006 (with Urmas Muru)
- Aluminium-house, 2007 (with Urmas Muru)
- Haabersti recreational center, 2007 (with Urmas Muru)
- Summer kitchen and sauna in Southern Estonia, 2008 (with Urmas Muru, Reet Viigipuu)
- Apartment buildings in Tallinn, 2008 (with Urmas Muru, Reet Viigipuu)
