= Kärt Tomingas =

Estonian actress and singer (1967–2025)

- Born: 5 April 1967; Tallinn, then part of Estonian SSR, Soviet Union
- Died: 31 January 2025 (aged 57)
- Occupations: Actress; singer; lecturer; teacher; theatre pedagogue
- Years active: 1987–2025
- Children: 2

Kärt Tomingas (5 April 1967 – 31 January 2025) was an Estonian singer, actress and teacher of performing arts. Her career began in the 1980s as a folk-pop, rock and jazz singer, and soon after that as an actress. After 2008, she also worked as a lecturer and teacher of acting.

== Early life and education ==
Kärt Tomingas was born in Tallinn on 5 April 1967, to architect Rein and Tamara Tomingas (née Palm). She had a sister and two paternal half-siblings. At an early age, her parents divorced and she moved with her mother and sister to Keila to live with her grandmother. There she attended primary and secondary schools, graduating from the Keila Gymnasium in 1985.

In 1986, she enrolled at the Tallinn Conservatory (now, Estonian Academy of Music and Theatre) to study acting and graduated in 1990. She received her master's degree in theatre from the academy in 2006.

== Career ==
=== Singing ===
Tomingas began her career as a singer, primarily of folk-pop, pop music and jazz with the ensemble Park, just after graduating from secondary school. She recorded her first singles in 1987. Her first solo album, Korallid, was released in 1992 on the Estonian Theka label. Her second solo album, Sinine Kivi, was released in 2003. In 2017, her third solo studio album, Tähistus, was released. Tomingas has also recorded music for compilation albums with Park. In 2004, a "best of" album titled Korallid: Laulud aastatest 1987-93 was released by the Estonian label Vinge Records.

Since 2016, Tomingas had performed with the Kärt Tomingas Trio, composed of Tomingas (vocals), and musicians Külli-Katri Esken (keyboards), and Meelis Süt (percussion). Esken and Süt had previously recorded music with Tomingas while they were members of the band Park.

=== Acting ===
Shortly after graduation from the Estonian Academy of Music and Theatre in 1990, Tomingas was engaged as stage actress at the Vanemuine theatre in Tartu, departing in 1992. Afterwards, she relocated to Helsinki, Finland, where she performed as an actress at the Helsinki City Theatre and the Lilla Theatre from 1994 until 1999. In 2000, she garnered the role of Siiri in the Aleksi Mäkelä-directed Finnish drama feature film Lomalla for Solar Films. From 2005 until 2007, she played the role of Heili Reek, an Estonian hairdresser, in the Finnish television drama series Kotikatu, which aired on Yle TV1.

Tomingas' first role in an Estonian film was the small role as Marta in the 1991 historical drama Surmatants, directed by Tõnu Virve. In 1992, she appeared as Lily in the Mati Põldre-directed biographical feature film Need vanad armastuskirjad, for Freyja Film, about Estonian composer Raimond Valgre. The film was selected as the Estonian entry for the Best Foreign Language Film at the 65th Academy Awards, but was not accepted as a nominee. In 2014, Tomingas appeared in the role of Pille in the Mihkel Ulk-directed drama feature film Nullpunkt, based on the 2010 novel of the same name by Estonian author Margus Karu.

In 1999, Tomingas appeared in the Eesti Televisioon (ETV) television drama film Stella Stellaris, directed by Ain Prosa and appearing opposite actors Ülle Kaljuste and Evald Hermaküla. The film was based on the 1927 short short story Thea, from the collection of short stories Anne-Marie, by writer August Mälk. In 2010, Tomingas appeared in the Ilmar Raag-directed drama miniseries Klass: elu pärast, which aired on ETV2. The miniseries was a follow-up on the aftermath of the 2007 feature film Klass in which two students (played by Pärt Uusberg and Vallo Kirs) commit a school shooting after enduring severe bullying. Tomingas played the role of Kaatariina, the mother of murdered secondary school bully Anders (played by Lauri Pedaja in the original film). In 2012, Tomingas had a starring role as Evelin Erikson in the ETV drama miniseries Alpimeja, which focuses on an investigation into a doping scandal after Estonia's women's Olympic swimming team are stripped of their medals.

Tomingas also worked as voice actress, voicing many of the characters in the Estonian language dubbing of the 1990-1991 joint Japanese-Finnish-Dutch anime television series Moomin, produced by Telecable Benelux BV and based on the Moomin novels and comic strips by the Finnish illustrator and author Tove Jansson and her brother Lars Jansson.

== Educator ==
Since 2008, Tomingas had been a lecturer of acting at the University of Tartu, and has taught acting at Tallinn University's Baltic Film, Media, Arts and Communication School.

== Personal life and death ==
Tomingas was in relationship with singer and musician Aare Jaama from 1987 until 1991. The couple had a daughter, Meri-Kris. Tomingas had been in a long-term relationship with architect Ülar Mark for many years. The couple have a daughter, Roberta and lived in Tallinn, with a summer home in Natturi.

In 2009, Tomingas authored a book, Sinisilmselt. Lood ja laulud, published by Menu Kirjastus. The book was written with the idea to give readers the opportunity to learn more about Tomingas and the meaning of many of her songs, as well as sharing thoughts on life, nature, and childhood trauma.

Tomingas died of an undisclosed illness on 31 January 2025, at the age of 57.
