= Velles =

Velles may refer to the following places in France:

- Velles, Indre, a commune in the Indre department
- Velles, Haute-Marne, a commune in the Haute-Marne department
