= Marika Lõoke =

Estonian architect

Marika Lõoke (born August 20, 1951, in Tallinn) is an Estonian architect.

== Education ==
From 1970 to 1975, Marika Lõoke studied in the State Art Institute of the Estonian SSR (today's Estonian Academy of Arts) in the department of architecture. She graduated from the institute in 1975.

== Career ==
From 1975 to 1990, Marika Lõoke worked in the design bureau EKE Projekt. From 1990 to present she works in the architectural bureau Okas&Lõoke OÜ.

Notable works by Marika Lõoke are the Forekspank bank office building, the apartment buildings in the Kaarli road and Rävala road and the Delta Palza office building. Marika Lõoke is a member of the Union of Estonian architects.

== Works ==
- Main office of the Forekspank bank in Tallinn, 1997 (with Jüri Okas)
- Estconde business center, 1999 (with Jüri Okas)
- Office building in Tallinn city center, 2001 (with Jüri Okas)
- Apartment and office building on Kaarli road, 2004 (with Jüri Okas)
- Apartment and office building on Rävala road, 2005 (with Jüri Okas)
- Delta Plaza business center, 2008 (with Jüri Okas)
