= Dmitri Bruns =

Estonian architect (1929–2020)

- Born: 11 January 1929; Riga, Latvia
- Died: 21 March 2020 (aged 91)
- Education: Leningrad Urban Planning Institute
- Occupation: Architect

Dmitri Bruns (Russian: Дмитрий Владимирович Брунс, Dmitry Vladimirovich Bruns; Latvian: Dmitrijs Brūns; 11 January 1929 – 21 March 2020) was a Latvia-born Soviet and Estonian architect and architecture theorist of Russian origin.

Bruns was born in Riga, Latvia. From 1959 he was the secretary of the Union of Architects of Estonian SSR. In 1960–1980 Bruns served as the chief architect of Tallinn.

== Honours ==
- Honoured Architect of Estonian SSR, 1973
- The Badge of Honour of Tallinn, 2003

== Publications ==
- "Tallinn täna ja homme", Tallinn: Eesti Riiklik Kirjastus 1962.
- "Homne Tallinn", Tallinn: Eesti Raamat 1973.
- "Tallinn valmistub olümpiaks", Tallinn: Kommunist 1979.
- "Tallinn. Linnaehituslik kujunemine", Tallinn: Valgus 1993. ISBN 5440013288
- "Tallinn. Linnaehitus Eesti Vabariigi aastail 1918 – 1940", Tallinn: Valgus 1998. ISBN 9985680324
- "Tallinna peaarhitekti mälestusi ja artikleid", Tallinn: Eesti Arhitektuurimuuseum 2007. ISBN 9789985982808
