= Eugen Sacharias =

Estonian architect

Eugen Sacharias (21 April 1906 in Berlin, Germany – 13 March 2002 in Adelaide, Australia) was an Estonian architect. He studied at the Czech Technical University in Prague from 1925 to 1931, after which he came to Tallinn to become one of the most important local designers of modern dwellings.

His early-1930s creation based on the simple rules of functionalistic architecture, while in the latter part of the decade, more influence of art deco appeared.

Sacharias has created a number of small villas, big apartment buildings and even a few small churches.

He fled from Estonia in 1941 in fear of Soviet terror, and spent the following eight years in Germany (living in Werneck, Berlin, and Gleiwitz in Eastern Germany), where he continued to work as an architect. In January 1945 he fled with his family from the approaching Russian troops back to Werneck, where he lived until 1949. He then moved to Adelaide, Australia, where he managed to create his own architecture bureau and carry on as an architect.

== Gallery ==
An apartment building on one of the main streets in Tallinn - Pärnu road. The building was built in 1936.

An apartment house on Pärnu road, built in 1934.

Pärnu road 26, built in 1935.

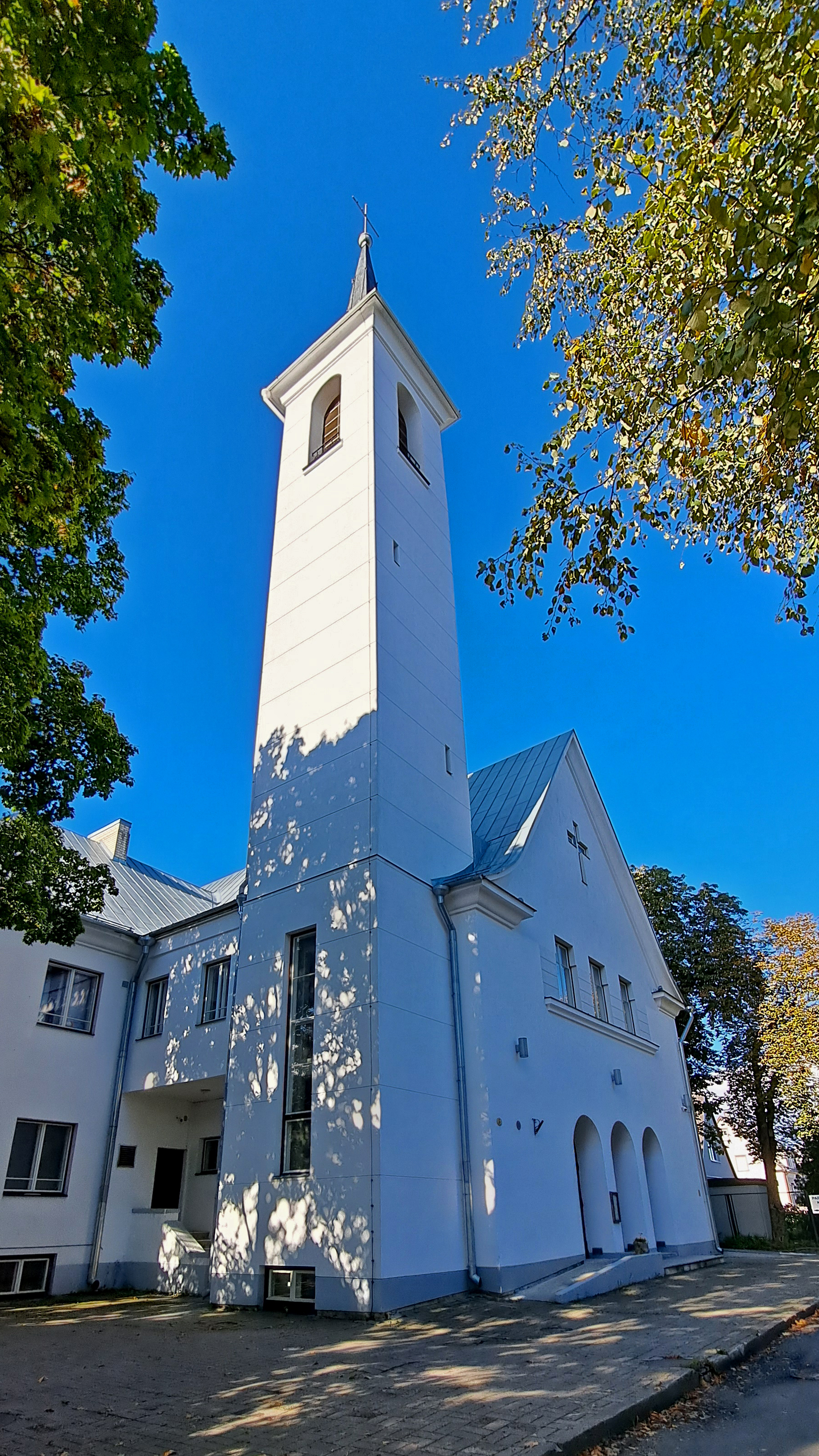
Tallinn Bethel Church in Pelgulinn.
