= Uno Prii =

Canadian architect

- Born: February 28, 1924; Tallinn, Estonia
- Died: November 27, 2000 (aged 76); Toronto, Ontario, Canada
- Occupation: Architect
- Buildings: The Vincennes, Prince Arthur Towers, 44 Walmer Road, Alan Brown Building

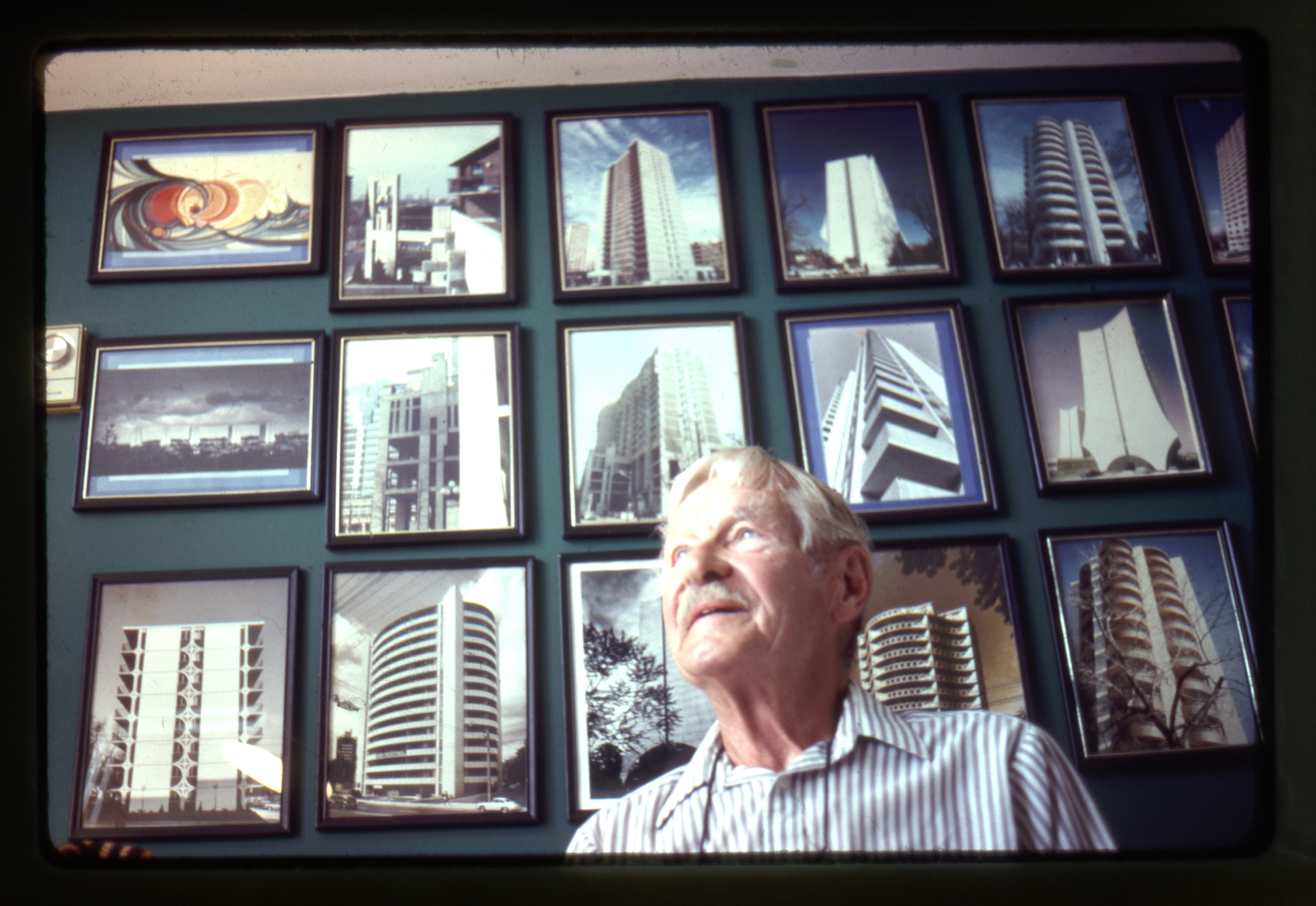
Uno Prii in his Bloor St. E. condominium with a picture gallery of his works.

Uno Prii (February 28, 1924 – November 27, 2000) was an Estonian-born Canadian architect. He designed approximately 250 buildings, many in Toronto, but also around southern Ontario and the United States.

Some of his best-known works are apartment buildings in The Annex neighbourhood of Toronto, featuring outlines that make sweeping curves. These include The Vincennes at 35 Walmer Road (built 1966), Prince Arthur Towers at 20 Prince Arthur Avenue (1968), Brazil Towers at 485 Huron Street, and 44 Walmer Road (1969).

== Early years ==
Uno Prii was born Tallinn and grew up in Estonia, where his father was an architect and builder. In 1943, Prii left for Finland, and in 1944, he moved to Stockholm, Sweden. He trained and worked as a civil engineer in Stockholm but left for Canada in 1950. He came to Toronto so that he could study architecture, and in 1955 he graduated cum laude from the University of Toronto School of Architecture, where he had studied under Eric Arthur. Every summer he worked with Eric Arthur's Fleury & Arthur firm until graduation.

== Career ==
Prii created his own architectural firm in 1957. Having his own firm allowed him to explore his architectural vision, which diverged from the straight lines and simple forms emphasized by Modernism, the dominant style at the time. In the 1960s, apartment living was quickly growing in popularity as thousands of immigrants arrived in Toronto. Baby boomers also entered the work force and sought convenient living spaces.

=== 1960s exuberance ===
The 1960s was Prii's most exuberant era, when he saw the completion of many buildings with the sculptural curves and artful details that he became known for. In this era, Prii took advantage of new slip-form concrete moulds which slid up buildings as concrete was being poured. The architect pushed his sculptural design ideas with passion. Some potential clients were alienated and walked away. Toronto builder Harry Hiller, a Polish-born carpenter by trade, was one client who was open to Prii's vision, and it was for him that Prii developed some of his most well-known apartment buildings, including 35 and 44 Walmer Road, and 20 Prince Arthur Avenue.

==== The Vincennes ====
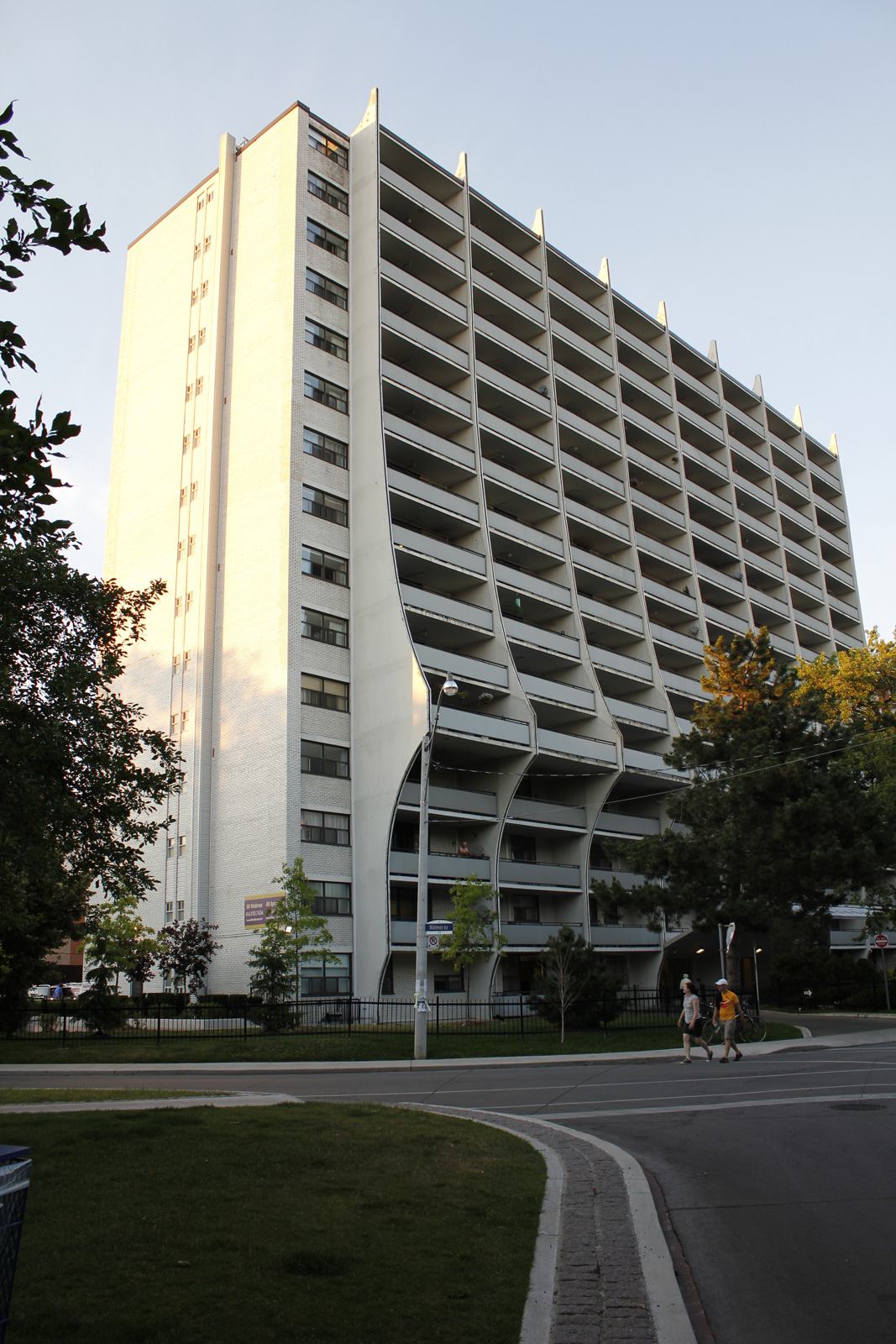
The Vincennes as seen from Walmer Circle.

Uno Prii's design for The Vincennes at 35 Walmer Road was among his boldest works yet. Prii's lightly curved façade features a dramatic yet elegant flare at the fifth floor, allowing for deeper balconies. The façade is white, a characteristic shared by several of his most distinctive towers from the 1960s. Fins shoot towards the sky. Prii designed the wide apartment tower with a large curved canopy over its entrance, perforated with a series of small holes at the edge. Harry Hiller completed the tower in 1966.

==== Prince Arthur Towers ====
It was at 20 Prince Arthur Avenue where the collaboration of Prii and Hiller produced what is arguably Prii's most expressive design ever to be realized. The single 23-storey high-rise apartment tower completed in 1968 emphasizes its vertical form with a bold, upwards-sweeping concrete façade. What appear to be flying buttresses create a massive flared base projecting outwards from the main façade. These elements not only became the distinguishing feature of the tower, but reduced the need for wind bracing. The 'flyers' merge with the façade, continuing upwards beyond the roofline, crowning the tower.

The sides are blank concrete walls with a smooth texture and white finish, save for a black vertical stripe running the length of the walls, opening up to a massive arch at ground level. A rectangular section of the façade behind the arch is painted black for contrast. The white walls are contrasted with opaque blue balcony railings on the main façade facing the street, as well as on the opposite side of the building. The minimalism of the side walls furthers the sculptural aesthetic of the tower.

In 1969, Uno Prii would also see the completion of the Jane-Exbury Towers in suburban North York, a series of five towers staggered one after the other. These white towers share a similar sculptural design that references both The Vincennes and the Prince Arthur Towers. The roofline and side walls with an arch at ground level recall the Prince Arthur Towers, and an outward flare in the façade just above the lowest floors is similar to the Vincennes. The staggered arrangement of the towers on a large suburban site, surrounded by open green spaces, gives the towers an impressive presence, taking advantage of the more open suburban context.

==== 44 Walmer Road ====
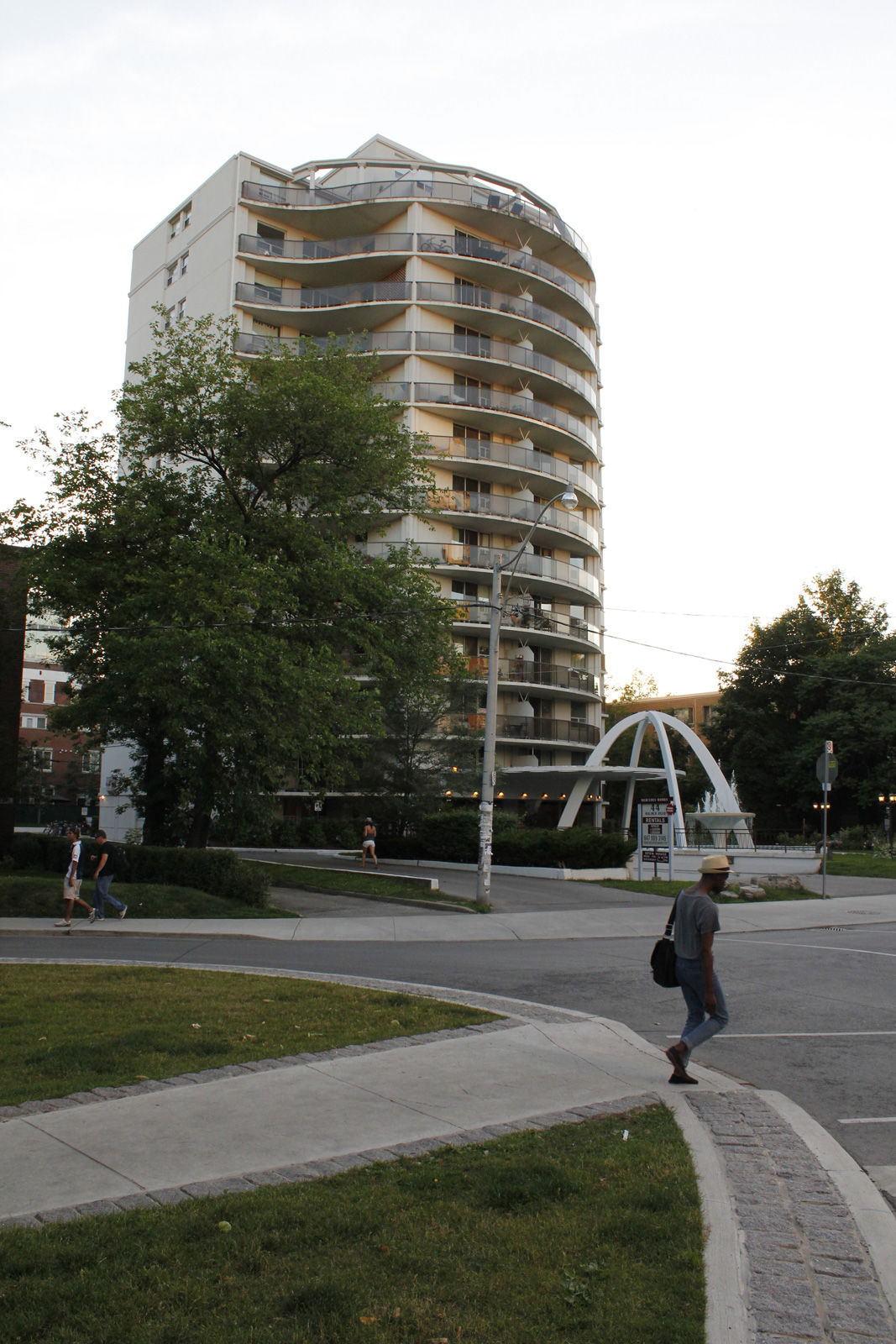
44 Walmer Road tower and fountain (1969) seen from Walmer Circle in 2011.

Prii worked with Hiller again, and in 1969, his design for 44 Walmer Road was completed. The white façade is light and thoroughly rounded. The 12-storey apartment building is characterized by circular and linear motifs, with a semi-circular canopy over the driveway in front, perforated with large holes around the edges. Prii also designed a complementary fountain located in front of the building with two intersecting parabolic arches over a circular pool, connecting with the canopy. The water sprays upwards out of a large, concrete element shaped like a champagne glass, and spills out into a pool.

The building featured curvilinear, circle-patterned balcony railings designed in an artful pattern as its most distinctive feature. They were removed for balcony repairs to be made, but then owner Gaetano D'Addario decided not to reinstall them, choosing unremarkable clear glass railings in July 2001 as the replacement, in spite of protests from tenants, neighbours, the architect's family, and individuals in the architecture community like Larry Richards of the University of Toronto Faculty of Architecture.

=== Transition in the 1970s and retirement ===
By the early 1970s, Uno Prii began to use more rectilinear forms. He adapted ancient imagery for decorative motifs, creating post and lintel allusions with concrete slabs, and stylized faces inspired by Moai and rectilinear human figures. In this period, he transitioned from glazed white brick to more organic hues like brown and natural terracotta, and from smooth white concrete to textured, grey concrete surfaces.

In the early 1980s, Prii retired and closed his design firm.

== Style and recognition ==
Prii was concerned that big apartment buildings tended to be seen as anonymous human filing cabinets, that unadorned rectangular towers did not offer tenants an identity. Apartment buildings with unusual and interesting exteriors could encourage a collective identity among tenants. Clients who wanted something unique from the repetitious geometry of the International style came to him. His best-known buildings were built in the 1960s—distinctive and original towers with a sculptural quality. Prii’s apartment buildings suggest an unsubtle protest against severe, autocratic, and humourless Modernism. In his free time he painted and sculpted, activities which he claimed to have influenced his compositions.

Critics considered the buildings strange. Like Morris Lapidus in the United States, Uno Prii found himself popular, but not acclaimed, receiving no awards or recognition from his fellow architects. He noted in a 1999 interview in Taddle Creek that “they thought my work just looked funny...they didn’t like me...they didn’t like my work at all", though he remained proud of his original compositions, observing that "originality is the hardest thing to come by."

However, by the late 1980s and early 1990s, a new generation of architects and architectural enthusiasts had rediscovered the work of Uno Prii. Architects such as Michael McClelland of E.R.A. Architects, John Shnier of Kohn Shnier Architects, the University of Toronto's Larry Richards, past chairman of the Toronto Society of Architects Joe Lobko, and heritage architect Catherine Nasmith, have spoken of the importance of his work. As of 2007, 16 buildings designed by Prii have been listed in Toronto's Inventory of Heritage Properties.

== Works ==
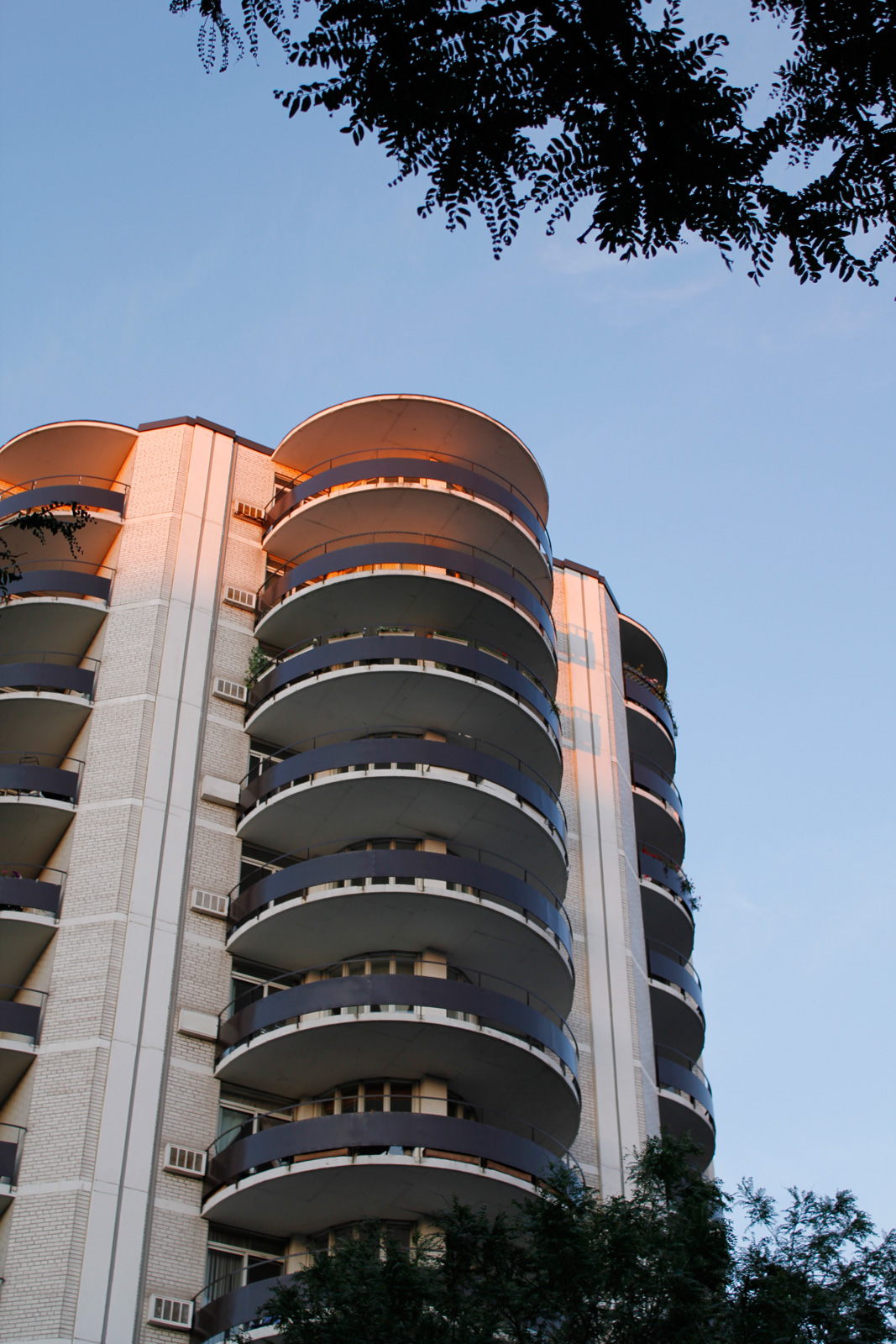
Brazil Towers at 485 Huron Street (1968) in 2011

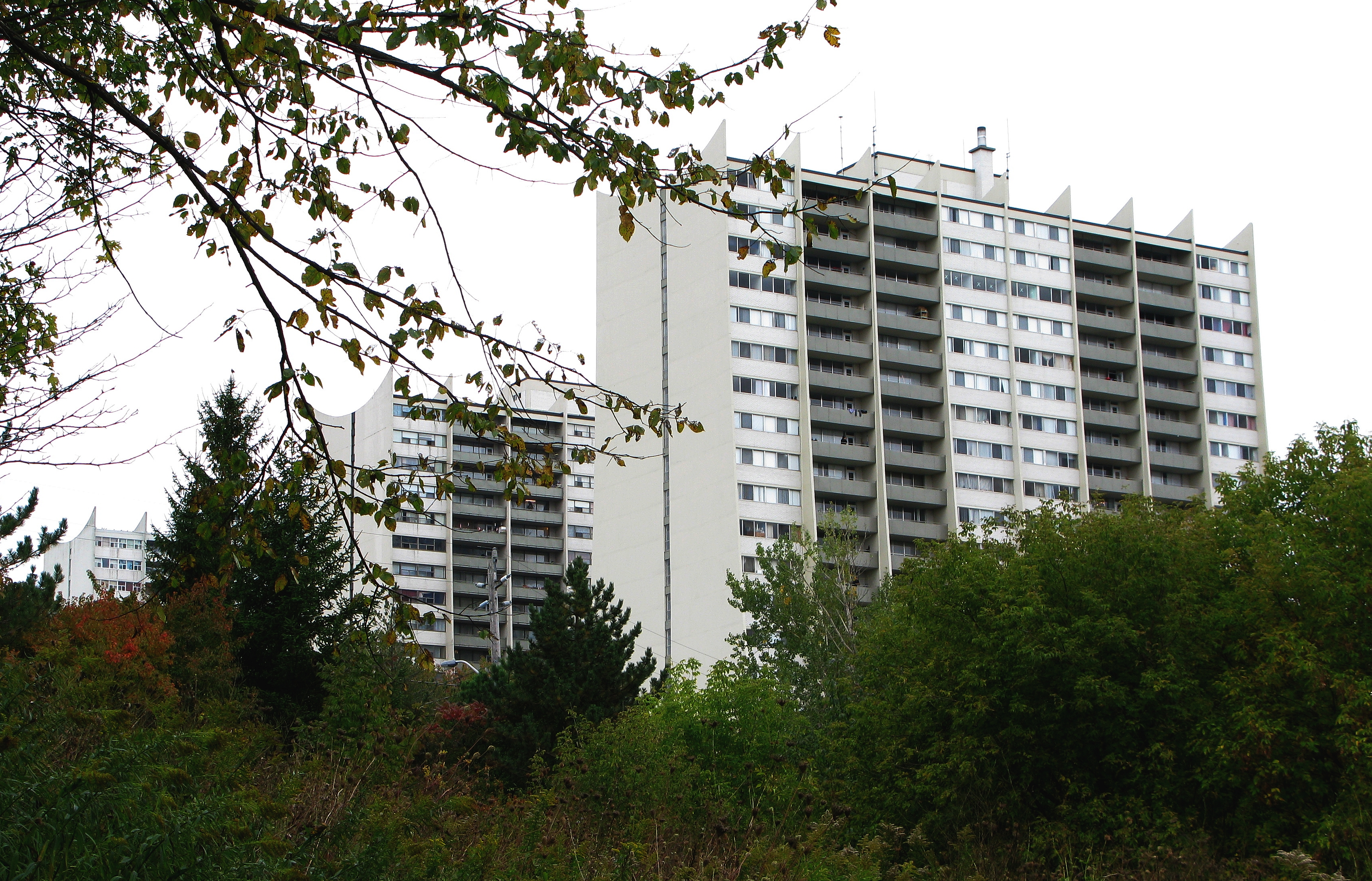
Jane-Exbury Towers

- 11 Walmer Road, Toronto, 1963
- Americana, 141 Erskine Avenue, Toronto, 1963
- 300 Eglinton East, Toronto, 1964
- 425 Avenue Road, Toronto, 1965
- The Vincennes, 35 Walmer Road, Toronto, 1966
- 90 Warren Road, Toronto, 1968
- Brazil Towers, 485 Huron Street, Toronto, 1968
- Gallery Towers, 50 Stephanie Street, Toronto, 1968
- Prince Arthur Towers, 20 Price Arthur Avenue, Toronto, 1968
- 44 Walmer Road, Toronto, 1969
- Jane-Exbury Towers, Toronto, 1969
- 100 Spadina Road, Toronto, 1969
- Spadina Towers, 666 Spadina Avenue, Toronto, 1972
- Weston Towers, 3400 Weston Road, Toronto, 1972
- Alan Brown Building, 77 Elm Street, Toronto, 1983
- 22 Walmer Road (now substantially renovated)
