= Raivo Puusepp =

Estonian architect

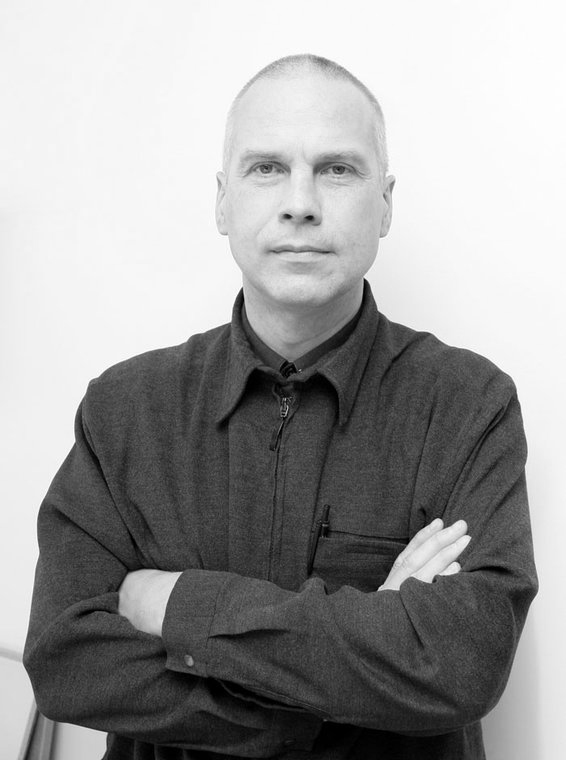
Raivo Puusepp

Raivo Puusepp (born 21 March 1960) is an Estonian architect.

His notable works include:

- Main building of SEB in Tallinn
- Tartu Department Store (Estonian: Tartu Kaubamaja), Tartu
- Solaris Center, Tallinn
- WW Passage (WW Passaaž), Tallinn
- Sikupilli Shopping Centre, Tallinn

== Gallery ==
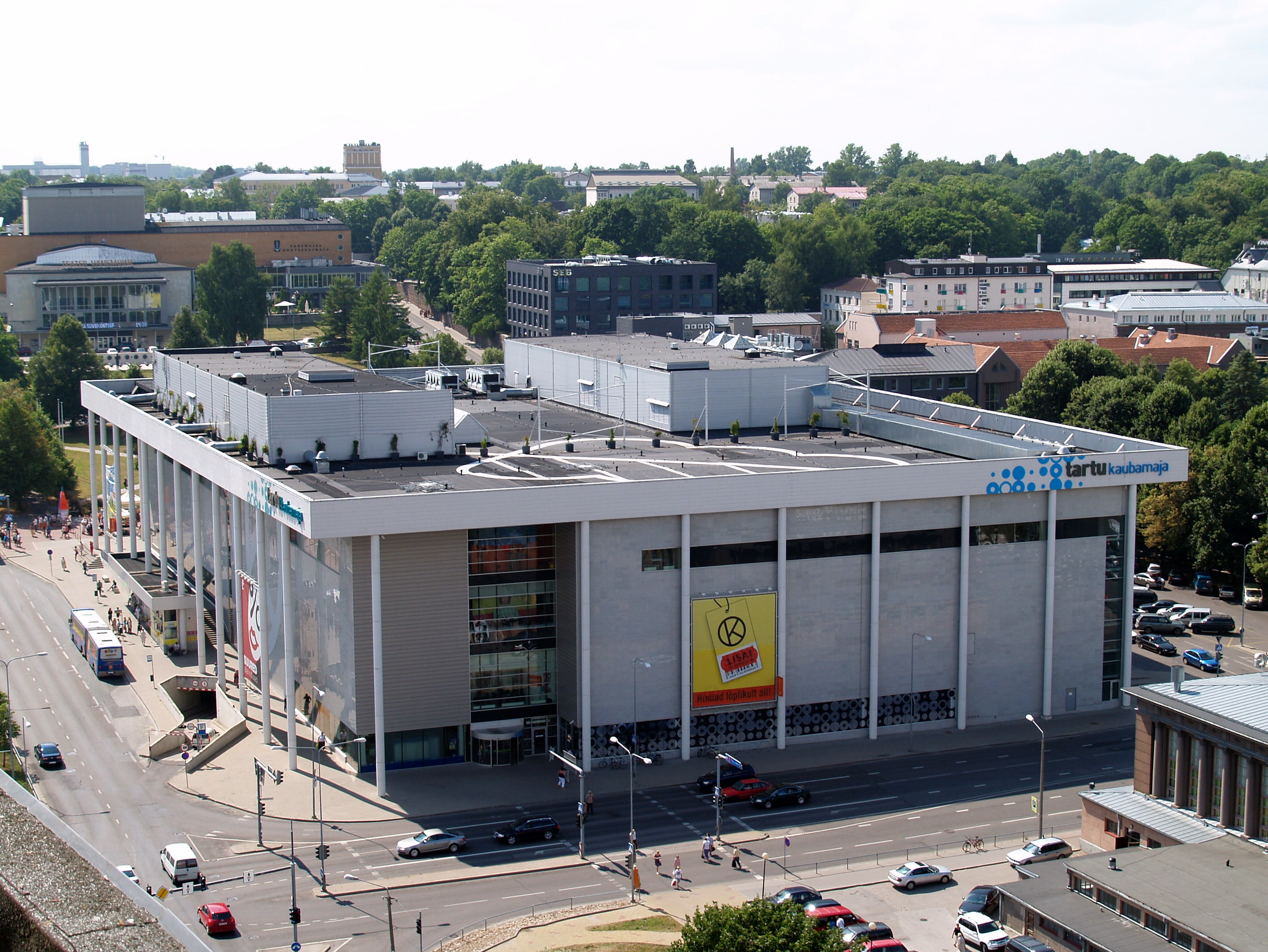
Tartu Kaubamaja
