= Teodor Ussisoo =

Estonian interior architect

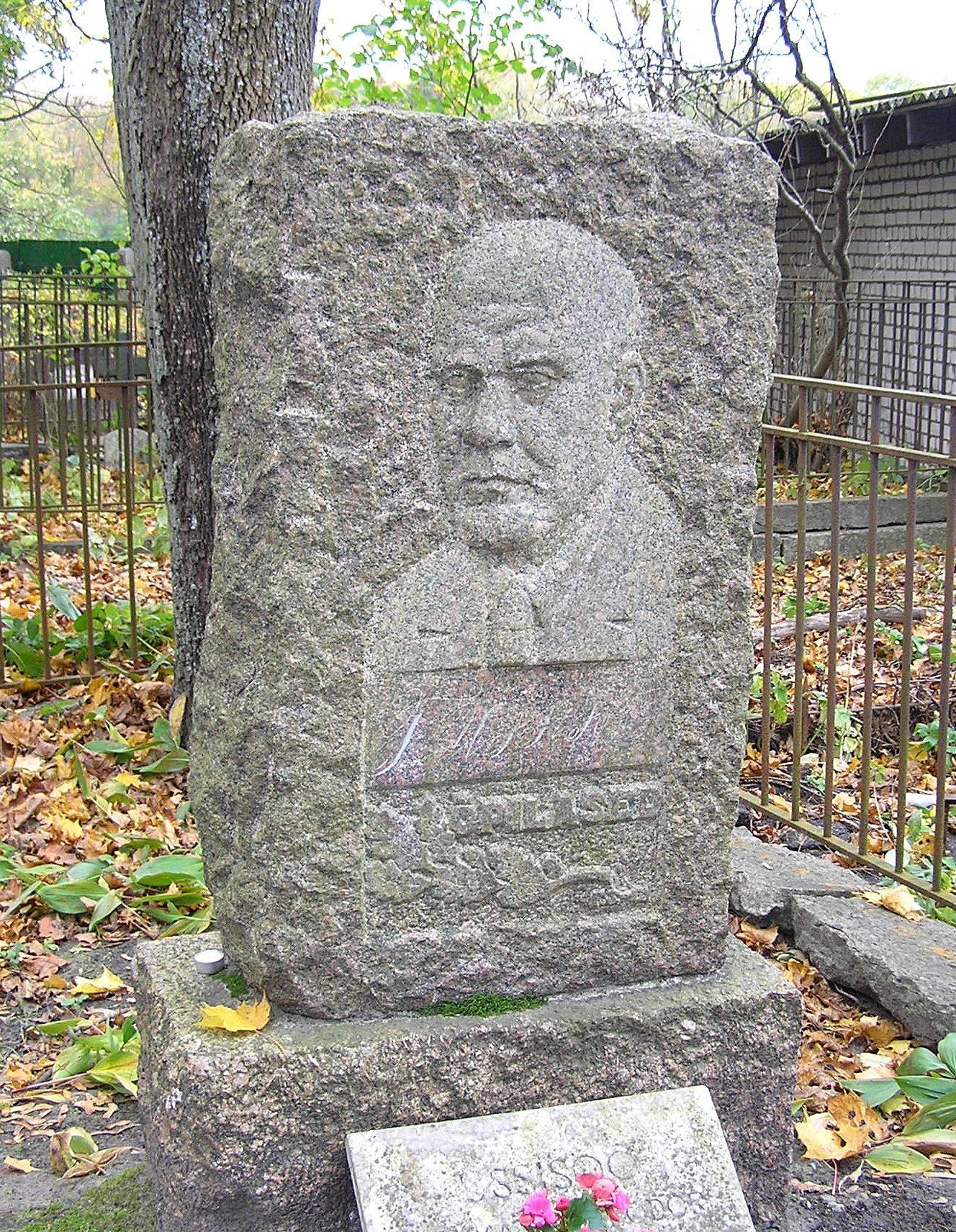
Ussisoo's grave in the Vana-Kaarli cemetery in Tallinn

Teodor Ussisoo (also Theodor Ussisoo; 27 February 1878 Paide – 26 September 1959, Tallinn) was an Estonian pedagogue, furniture designer, and interior architect.

== Biography ==
He attended a district school between 1888–1894 and a railway technical college in Tallinn between 1895 and 1898. In 1909 he graduated in furniture making in Leipzig, Germany, and in 1913 interior architecture at the Köthen Technical Art School. He worked as a school teacher in Tallinn and was appointed the head of the State Technical School in 1922. Ussisoo was responsible for the designs of the first Estonian kroons and postage stamps issued after the establishment of the Estonian republic in 1918. Ussisoo was arrested by the Soviet occupation authorities in 1949 and deported to Krasnoyarsk Krai and was released in 1956. His son Uno Ussisoo was an encyclopedist and translator.
