= Georg Hellat =

Estonian architect

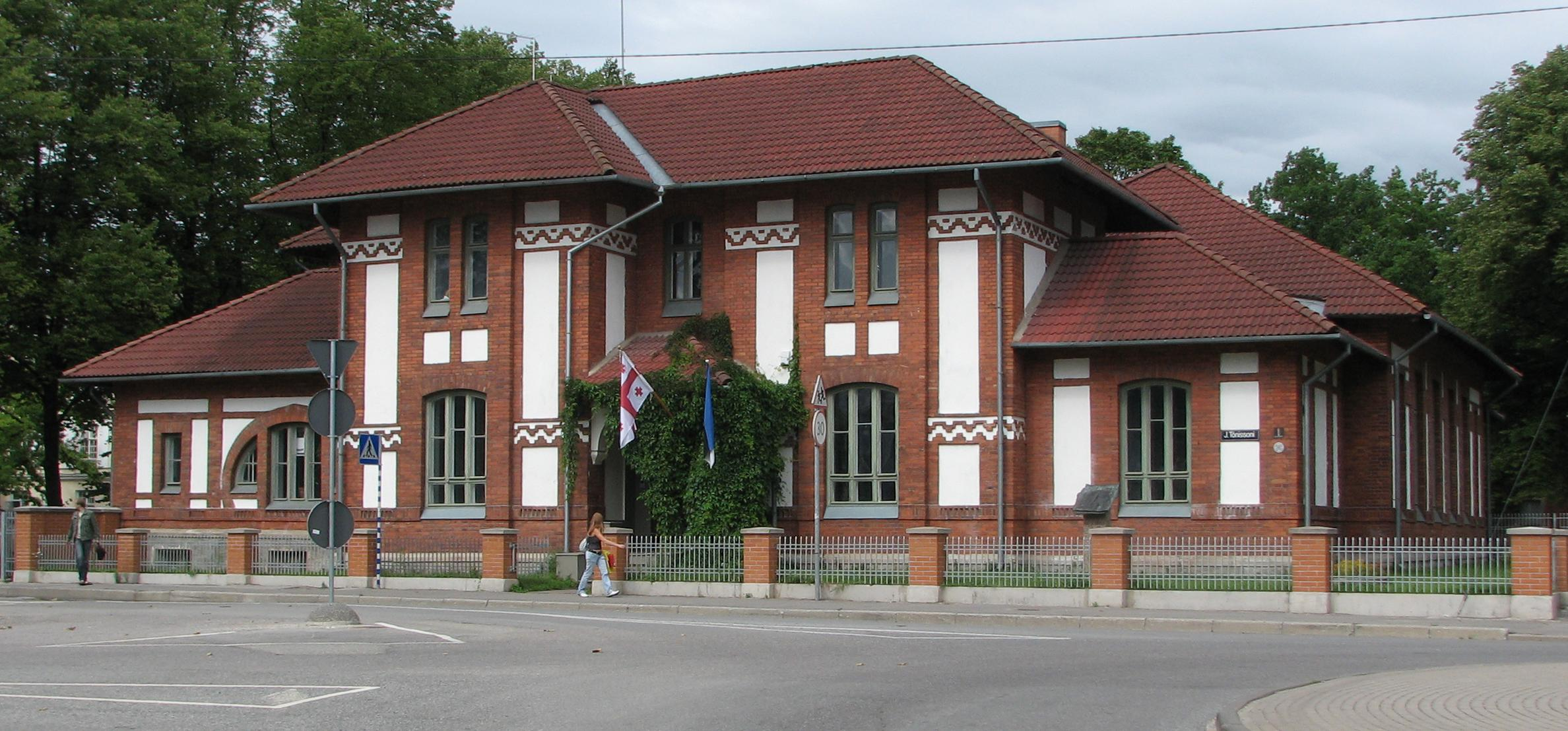
Building of the Estonian Students' Society

Georg Hellat (3 March 1870, Puka, Governorate of Livonia – 28 August 1943, Tallinn, Generalbezirk Estland) was an Estonian architect.

His best-known masterpiece is the building of the Estonian Students' Society in Tartu (1902).

== Creation ==
One of the most important buildings designed by Georg Hellat is 1902 located in Tartu. The EÜS building completed in 2011, which is considered the first building in the Estonian national style. One of the most interesting buildings in Tallinn is the Kalamaja Primary School, which was remarkably modern for its time, as it already had central heating, spacious and bright classrooms, a gymnasium and a shower room.
