= Union of Estonian Architects =

Organization based in Estonia

Union of Estonian Architects (or Estonian Association of Architects, EAA; Estonian: Eesti Arhitektide Liit) organizes architects, landscape architects and architecture researchers.

EAA re-established 27 June 1989. EAA is a legal successor of Estonian Association of Architects, which was established on 8 October 1921.

Since 2010 the head of EAA is Peeter Pere.

Every year EAA gives out annual prize to Estonian architects or to Estonian architectural firms who have projected the most notable structure in the past year.

EAA publishes Newsletter of the Estonian Association of Architects. It is issued once or twice per year.
