= Estonian Academy of Arts =

Arts university in Tallinn, Estonia

Coordinates: 59°26′6.35″N 24°45′30.78″E

- Eesti Kunstiakadeemia
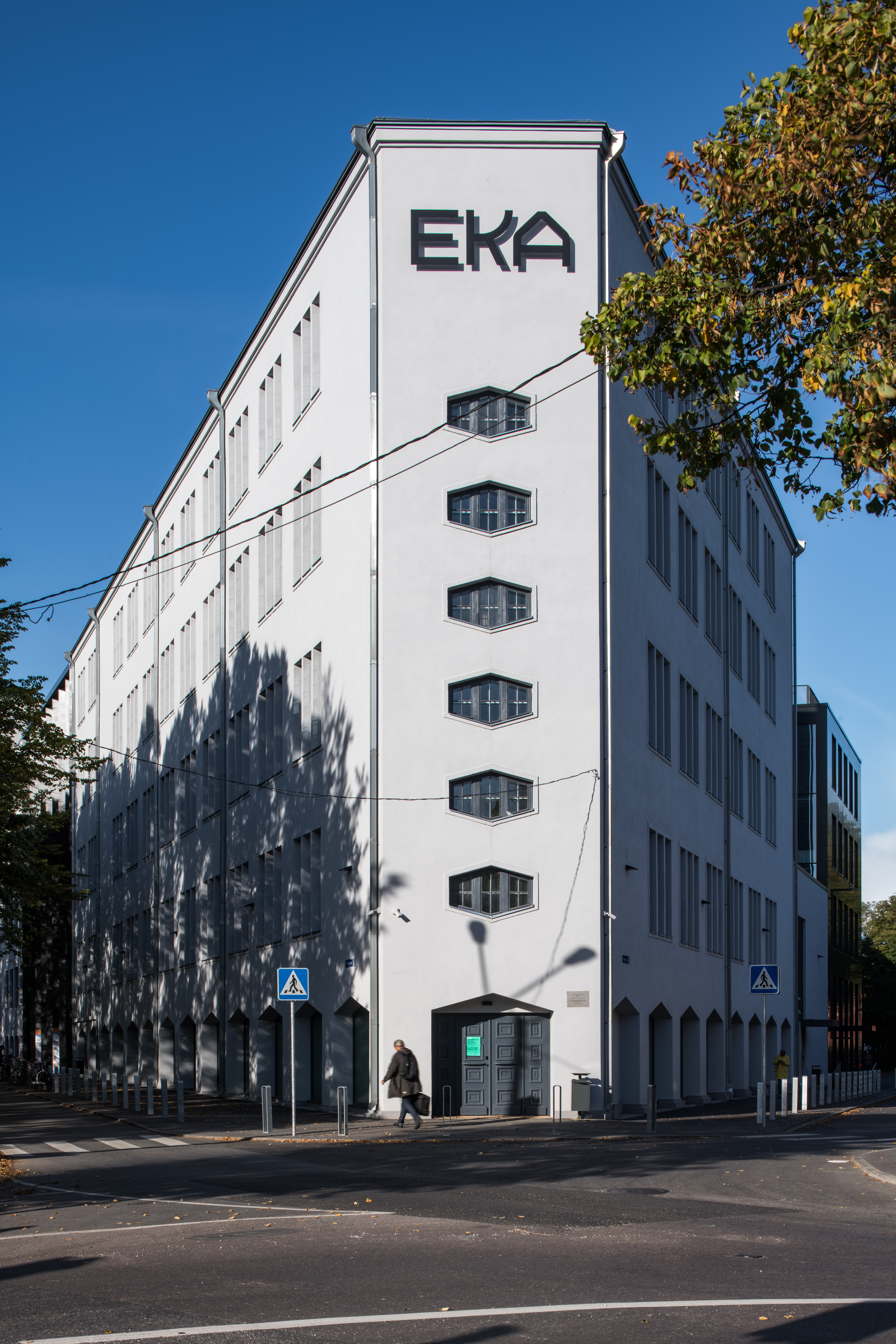
- Other names: EKA
- Motto: Kunst on töö hing. (Art is the soul of work.)
- Type: public
- Established: 1914; 112 years ago
- Academic affiliations: ELIA, CUMULUS, EAAE, KUNO, CIRRUS, Nordic Academy of Architecture
- Rector: Hilkka Hiiop
- Academic staff: 109
- Administrative staff: 138
- Students: 1210
- Undergraduates: 659
- Postgraduates: 476
- Doctoral students: 62
- Location: Tallinn, Estonia
- Website: www.artun.ee

The Estonian Academy of Arts (Estonian: Eesti Kunstiakadeemia, EKA) is the only public university in Estonia providing higher education in art, design, architecture, media, art history and conservation-restoration. It is based in Tallinn.

According to the Statutes of the EKA, the main objective of activity at the Estonian Academy of Arts is to promote creativity and research, enabling the acquirement of a contemporary higher education based on integrated study, meeting the standard of higher education in the field of fine arts, design, media, architecture, art history, conservation-restoration and teacher education.

With the Estonian Minister of Education and Research' Act no.145 from February 10, 2007, the EKA was accredited by an international expert committee as an institution.

The Estonian Academy of Arts has signed around 80 bilateral agreements with universities which participate in ERASMUS programme, but has also partner institutions outside the ERASMUS higher education space – in Switzerland, United States, Russia, Australia and also with some private universities within the European Union.

In 2024 Academy has withdrawn its Erasmus+ bilateral agreement with Israeli universities based on internal political policies.

== History ==
=== Foundation ===
The origin of EKA dates back to 1914, when the Estonian Art Society founded the Tallinn Industrial Art School. It was the first and for a while the only art school in Estonia. The founders based the original curriculum on that of the art school founded by Baron Alexander von Stieglitz in St. Petersburg. This system prioritised technical and practical skills.

=== Interwar independence period ===
Following the Estonian War of Independence, the Tallinn Industrial Art School became the State Industrial Art School in 1920 providing education in all specialities of applied arts. Educational reformation was completed by 1922, crossing over to a European multi-stage school type. As a result, it became possible to apply for a specialist diploma or applied artist (from 1934). During the 1920s new workshops and departments were opened (study of printery, sculpture, graphics, ceramics, metal, glass grinding and engraving, fabric weaving), which essentially made studies more versatile. Among the teaching staff there were many who had studied in Europe. In 1938 the State School of Industrial Arts was reformed into two separate institutions: the State School of Industrial and Pictorial Arts and the Higher State Art School.

=== Soviet period ===
The 1940 Soviet occupation of Estonia, severed the country's art contacts with the rest of the world. State art schools were liquidated, the school was renamed State Applied Art School named after Jaan Koort. During World War II the school was often closed and teaching was highly episodic.

In 1944 the school was renamed Tallinn State Applied Art Institute of the ESSR. In 1951 Pallas Art School in Tartu was closed and the specialities of fine arts were transferred to Tallinn. This meant the whole of art education in Estonia was now based in Tallinn. The school was once again renamed to State Art Institute of the Estonian SSR (SAIE/Estonian abbreviation for ERKI). The educational system acquired new features and subject divisions characteristic of a Soviet university, including three main cycles – social sciences, general and theoretical art subjects and practical art subjects. In 1949 the department of architecture was transferred from Tallinn Polytechnical Institute (now Tallinn University of Technology) to ERKI, forming a new field together with interior architecture. In 1966, the industrial art division was renamed the department of design. With this ERKI became the only school in Estonia providing higher education in all fields of art and architecture. From 1959 to 1989 the rector of ERKI was Jaan Vares, under whose leadership the school became, in spite of the pressure of Soviet ideology, a popular educational institution with liberal attitudes and European standards, where students of up to 20 nationalities studied throughout several decades and where several generations of Estonian artists have acquired their education. The reputation of ERKI expanded also to former communist countries in Eastern Europe, student groups were exchanged, students and teaching staff participated in international competitions and exhibitions, receiving much publicity and awards. In 1978 a foundation was laid to the unique tradition of Finno-Ugric expeditions of ERKI under the leadership of Professor Kaljo Põllu. The original building became too small for a rapidly developing school and the main building of the institute was reconstructed according to the plans of architect P. Tarvas (I stage 1965–1967, II stage 1974), also the study building of interior architecture was acquired on Suur-Kloostri street in Tallinn Old Town.

=== Since 1989 ===
In 1989, ERKI was renamed Tallinn Art University, marking the start of a new period in the history of the school. One of the most prominent Estonian art historians, Jaak Kangilaski, was elected rector. Reformation of the educational system was begun according to policy changes taking place in higher education of the state. The period of study was first reduced to 4.5 years. The course system was preserved, but a new system of credit points was introduced. In the course of these changes new levels of education were introduced: diploma, Bbchelor's, master's, and doctorate. In the middle of the 1990s economic crisis general recession increased in the school. In 1995 The Tallinn Art University was renamed The Estonian Academy of Arts (EKA). The name was certified in 1996. International contacts of the school increased greatly: student and teaching staff exchanges, participation in SOCRATES, Leonardo da Vinci, Tempus Phare etc. programmes, organisation of conferences, workshops, festivals etc. Formerly non-existent publication activities were started. Development of the academy was supported by the new economic and financial system, which brought along some bad decisions, but which eventually started to pull the school out of the recession. One of the main turning points was the provision of a new concept of teaching, which was based on a Western model – lifelong learning or continuous education. For this purpose the advanced training of art educators began in 1996. The Open Academy of the EKA started its work in 1997. The Tallinn School of Conservation was opened as part of the academy. Other sub-institutions of the academy include the College of Applied Art, providing an art education for Russian-speaking students, and Academia Non Grata in Pärnu, which extended the teaching area beyond Tallinn. New centres were opened for modernisation of studies in 1994: the e-media centre and photography department, as well as new chairs – media art, interdisciplinary arts and protection of cultural heritage. An inter-speciality integrated curriculum was created (Faculty of Design, Faculty of Fine Arts). From 1997 to 2000, a new and contemporary library was constructed in the school. In 1999, The Estonian Academy of Arts joined the SOCRATES/ERASMUS programme. In 2002 the curriculum of the EKA was updated according to principles of the Bologna Declaration, bringing them into compliance with the standard system of levels of higher education implemented in the European Union. The first students having studied on the basis of the updated curriculum graduated in 2006. In 2005 textile artist Signe Kivi was elected rector of The Estonian Academy of Arts (Minister of Culture of the Republic of Estonia 1999–2001; member of Parliament 2002–2005). Development of new programmes and strategies started, as a result of which the development programme of The Estonian Academy of Arts for 2006–2010 was certified in the Council of the EKA on January 31, 2006.

In the 2006 spring semester (March 31), the Council of the EKA approved the decision to start construction of a new building for the Estonian Academy of Arts, at the historical location of Tartu Maantee 1. In 2013, however, the Council decided for another location: the former building of the Suva stockings factory, at the corner of Kotzebue tänav and Põhja puiestee in the subdistrict of Kalamaja. During the renovation of the building the academy was accommodated in the former Estonian Knighthood House on Toompea. In 2018 it moved to its new premises.

== See also ==
- Culture of Estonia
- Pallas University of Applied Sciences
