= Erika Nõva =

Estonian architect

Erika Nõva and Alar Kotli: The English College, now the main building of Tallinn University (1939).

Erika Nõva née Volberg (4 April 1905, Muuksi – 22 April 1987, Tallinn) was an Estonian architect, remembered mainly for her farmhouse designs. She was the first woman to graduate as an architect in Estonia.

== Biography ==
Nõva studied at the Tallinn College of Engineering becoming the Estonia's first female architecture graduate in 1925. Her first post was with the Settlement Office run by the Estonian Ministry of Agriculture which established new areas for settlement on land owned by the State. The hundreds of farmhouses she designed between 1933 and 1938 were inspired by traditional farm dwellings housing people on one side and livestock on the other. Her simple, pragmatic designs were also reflected in her farmhouse furniture. The schools in Pillapalu, Koiduküla and Peressaare were also designed by Erika Nõva. After the Second World War, Nõva carried out planning work for municipalities and farming areas, frequently returning to farmhouse design.

An exhibition of Erika Nõva's work arranged by her granddaughter Siiri Nõva was held in 2005 at the Museum of Estonian Architecture in Tallinn.

Eriks's elder brother August Volberg was also an architect.

== Selected works ==
Among Erika Nõva's principal works are:

- Tallinn Sports Hall (1938)
- Tallinn English College, together with Alar Kotli, (1939), now the main building at Tallinn University
- Tallinn Central Hospital (1940)
- Kalev Stadium, together with Alar Kotli (1952)

== Literature ==
- Lass, Anne: Erika Nõva: minu töö ja elu, 2006, Tallinn, Arhitektuurimuuseum, 72 pp. ISBN 978-9985-9585-6-8. (in Estonian)
