= August Volberg =

Estonian architect and educator

August Volberg (18 December 1896 Muuksi, Harju County – 21 June 1982 Tallinn) was an Estonian architect and educator.

In 1927, he graduated from Tallinn Technical School. In 1930, the Estonian Red Cross sanatorium in Haapsalu, named after General Johan Laidoner, was designed by August Volberg. The building was completed in 1937. From 1950-1960, he worked at the architectural bureau Eesti Projekt. From 1946 until 1954, he worked as a lecturer at the Tallinn Polytechnic Institute. From 1964 until 1981, he was a lecturer at the Estonian SSR State Art Institute; from 1971, he was the institute's head of the department of architecture.

Awards:

- 1956: Estonian SSR merited artistic personnel

== Works ==
- 1930: August Volberg designed the Estonian Red Cross sanatorium in Haapsalu, dedicated to General Johan Laidoner. Completed in 1937, the functionalist building featured 41 double rooms and a sea-facing terrace. It was built primarily for veterans of the Estonian War of Independence. Key architectural highlights include the entrance and the glass stairwell wall above it. The rooftop flagpole with its curved base structure underscores the building's significance. Its glass corner and facade design draw comparisons to Walter Gropius's architectural works in Germany.
- 1955: cinema Sõprus (with Peeter Tarvas)
- Pelguranna buildings (with K. Luts)
- 1970: Vanemuine Concert Hall (one of the authors)
