= Raine Karp =

Estonian architect

Raine Karp (born 23 July 1939) is an Estonian architect.

Raine Karp was born in Tallinn. He studied construction at the Tallinn Polytechnic Institute (TPI) for two years (1957-1959) and went to study architecture in Tallinn State Institute of Applied Art (1959-1964). During the time of the Estonian SSR he worked at the SDI Eesti Kommunaalprojekt (1960-1963), the SDI Eesti Projekt (1963-1973 and 1978-1990) and the SDI Eesti Tööstusprojekt (1975-1978). After the fall of the Soviet Union, during the period when the economy and construction again recovered, Raine Karp founded his one-man architectural office in 1996.

== Creation ==
Raine Karp created some of the boldest examples of 1960s–1980s modernism in Estonia. Characterised by monumentalism, his designs often have a distinct Soviet feel to them. Karp was awarded several prizes for his works, and was among the best-known architects of the now-defunct Estonian SSR.

Since 1962, the number of Raine Karp projects has exceeded 300. His designs in Tallinn include large-scale urban dominants such as the Linnahall convention center (1975–1980, with Riina Altmäe), the National Library of Estonia (1985–1993), Tallinn Central Post Office (1974–1980, with Mati Raigna), Sakala center (1982–1985, now demolished), the current building of the Estonian Ministry of Foreign Affairs (1964–1968, with Uno Tölpus, Mart Port and Olga Kontšajeva), apartment houses Trummi street 21 (1968–1971) and Vilde 68 & 70 (1963–1965), etc.

== Gallery ==
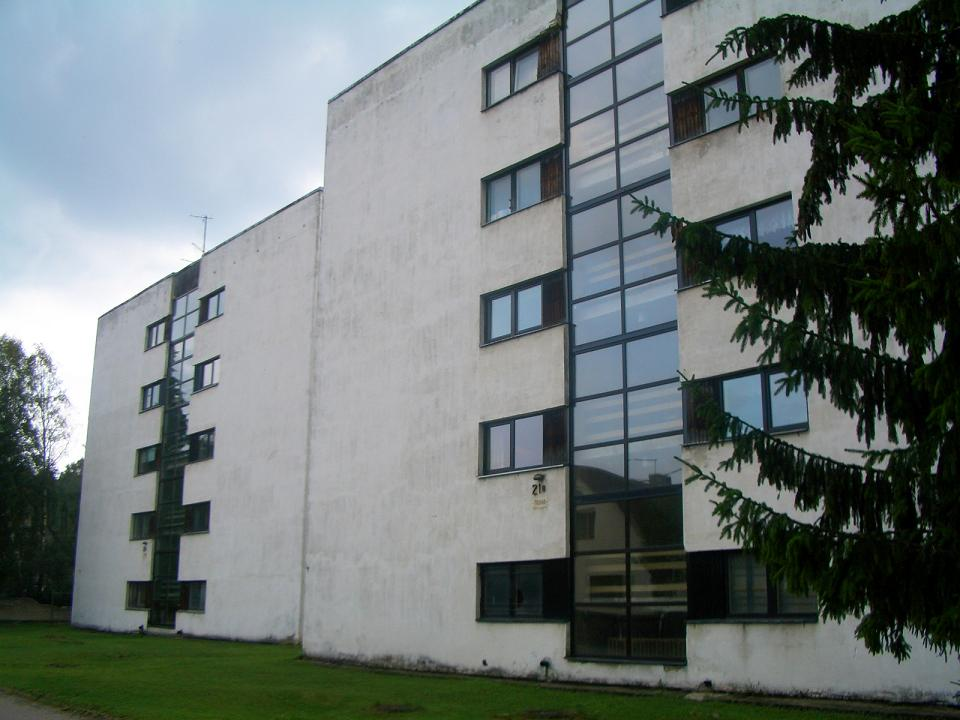
Residential quarter at Trummi 21, dwellings. (1970-1971)

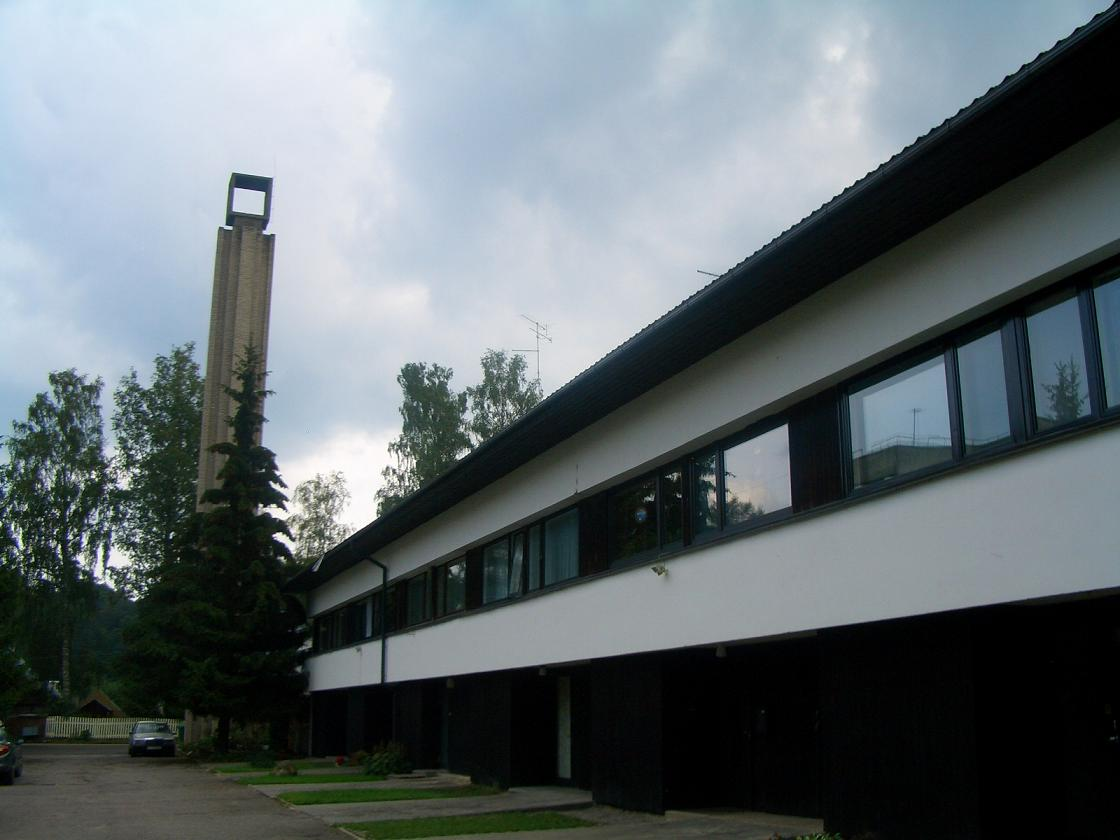
Residential quarter at Trummi 21, row-house. (1970-1971)

Tallinn Central Post Office, co-author Mati Raigna. Project 1974, completed 1980, now renovated

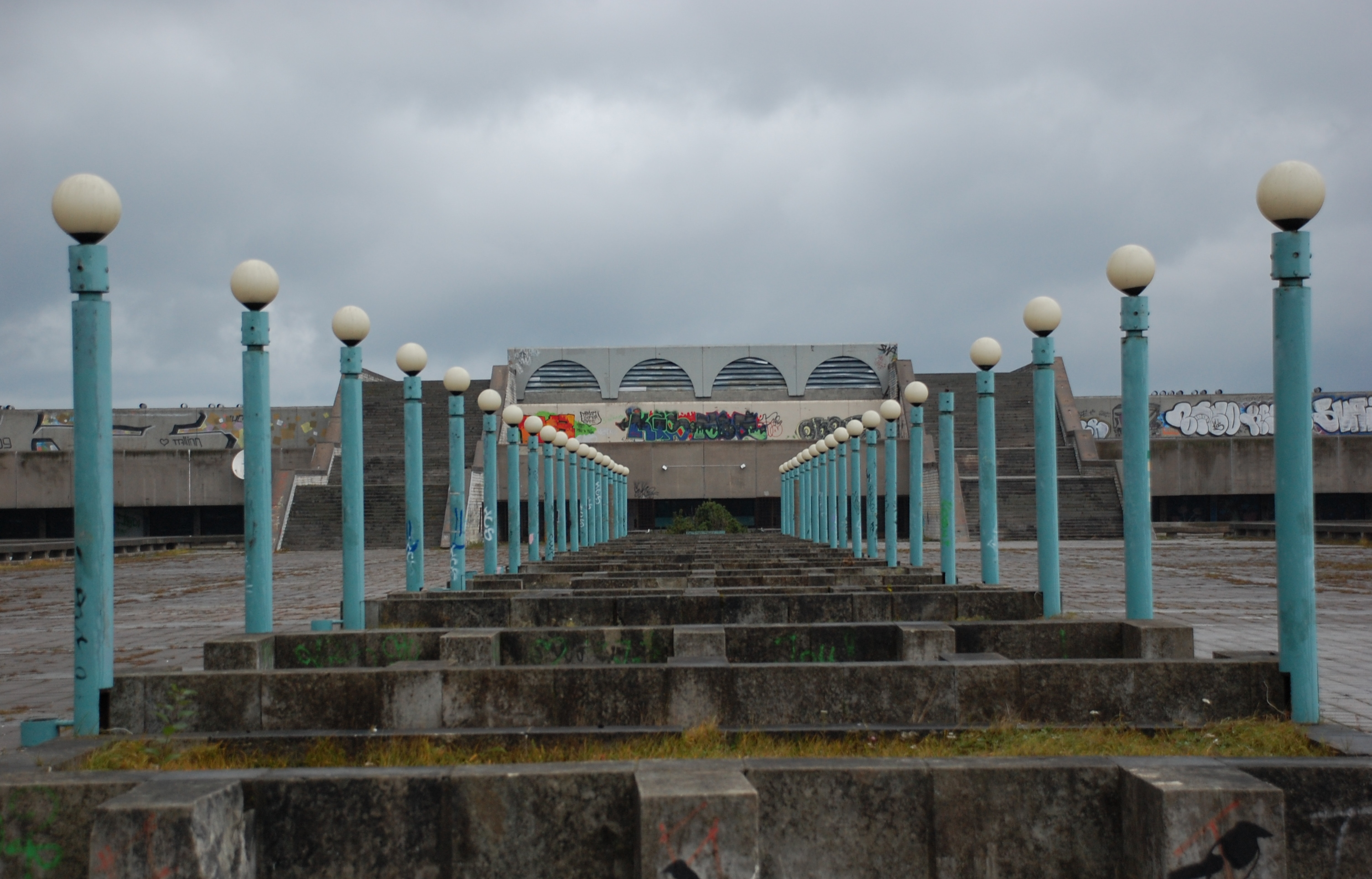
Tallinn Linnahall (1980-1981, with Riina Altmäe)

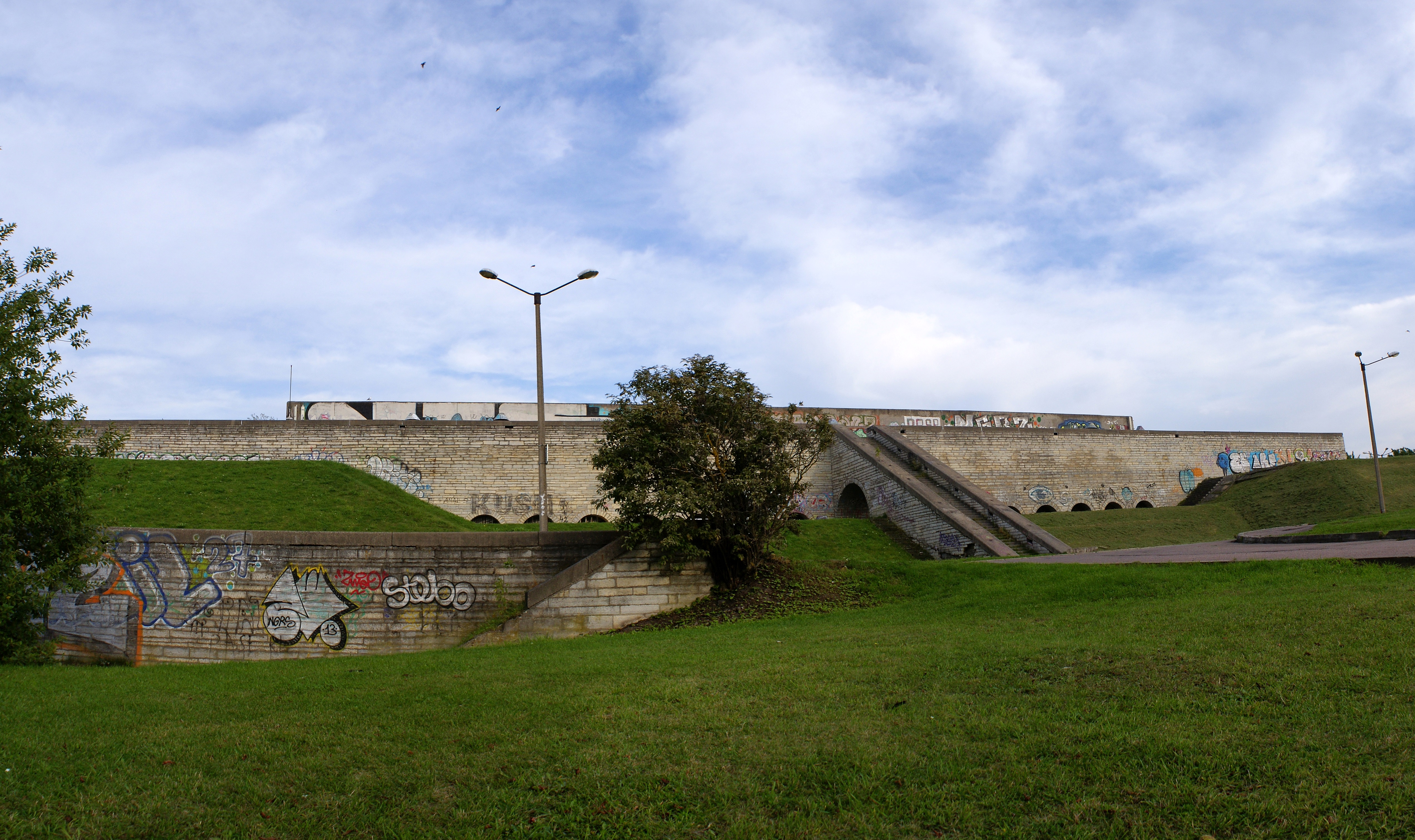
Tallinn Linnahall (1980-1981, with Riina Altmäe)

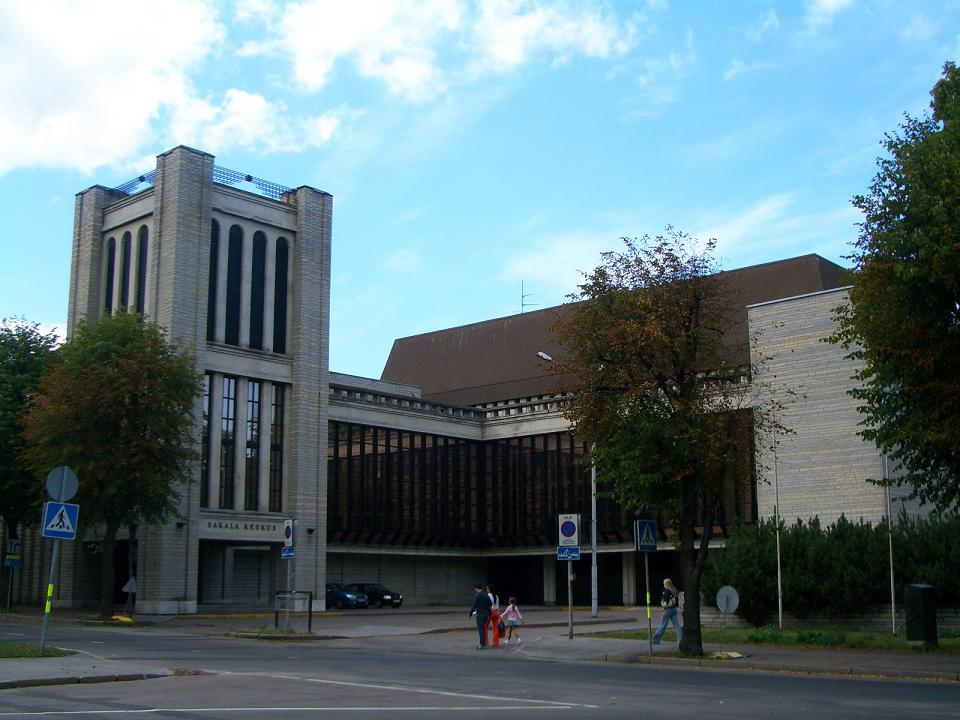
Sakala center, formerly the building for Political Education. The building was almost completely demolished in 2007. Only the tower was left standing.

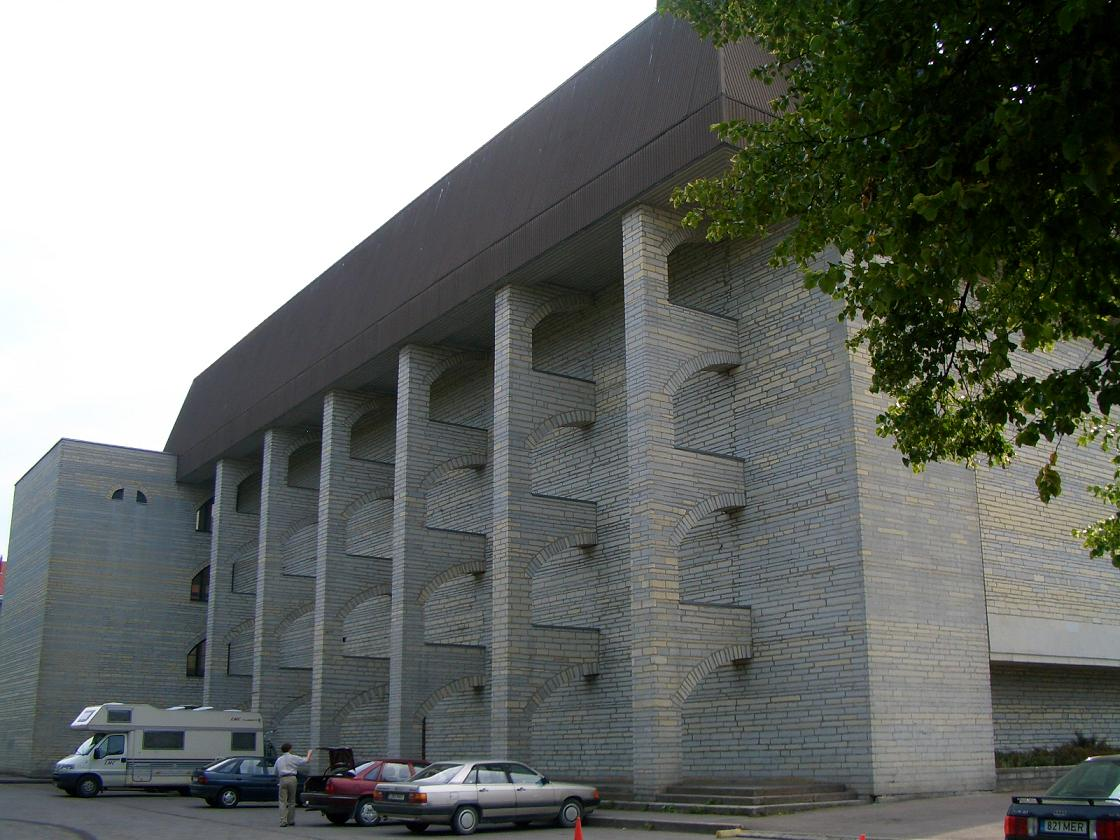
Sakala center from a different angle.

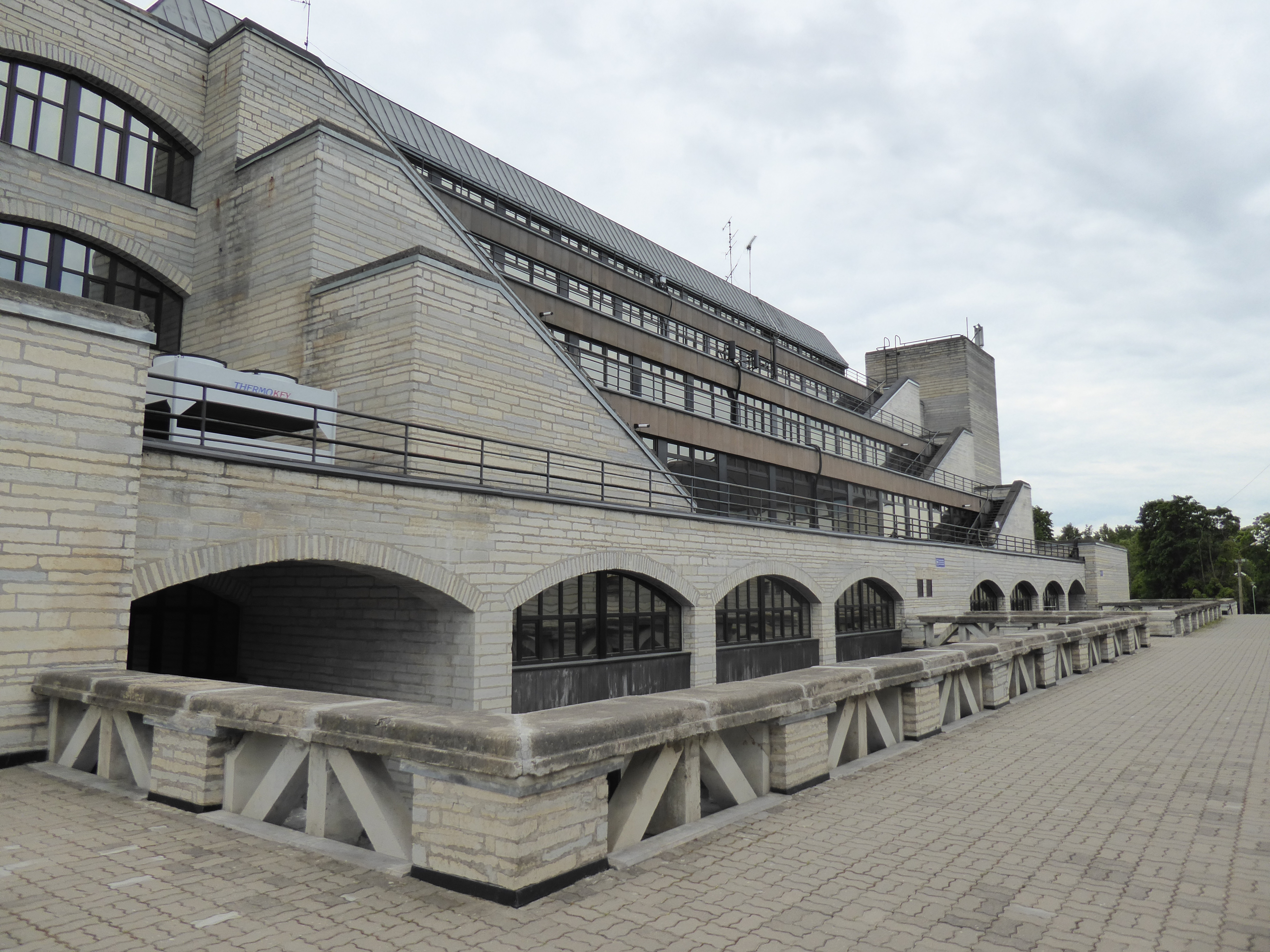
National Library of Estonia (1993)

== Built projects ==
- Ministry of Foreign Affairs (1968, with main author Uno Tölpus, co-authors Mart Port and Olga Kontšajeva)
- Nine-storey calcium-silicate brick apartment building in Mustamäe (built in the late 1960s and early 1970)
- Residence for employees of the ESSR Communal Ministry (1970, with Toivo Kallas)
- Architect's personal residence, 45 Viimsi Rd, Tallinn (1970)
- Holiday home in Rannapungerja (1970)
- Residential quarter at 21 Trummi in Tallinn for workers of the Academy of Sciences (1970-1971)
- Tallinn Polytechnic Institute (now Tallinn University of Technology) athletics centre (1976)
- Tallinn Central Post Office (1980, with Mati Raigna)
- Institute of Chemical and Biological Physics (1979, with Mare Lõhmus)
- ESSR Council of Ministers holiday complex residence in Valgeranna (1984)
- Sakala Centre (1985)
- Tallinn Linnahall with ice arena (1980-1981, with Riina Altmäe)
- Urban villa, 3a Kuninga, Pärnu (1995)
- National Library of Estonia (1993)
- Estonian EXPO Centre central pavilion (1997)
- Renovation of the Tallinn University of Technology athletetics building (2003)
- Linnamäe Hydroelectric Station in Jõelähtme (2004)
- Keila-Joa Hydroelectric Station (2006)
- K90 Ski jump tower in Otepää (2006)
- Tehvandi Ski Centre in Otepää (2010)

== Unrealized projects ==
- Mustamäe residential district centre in Tallinn. Detailed plan and draft project. (1970)
- Building VI of the Tallinn Polytechnic Institute in Mustamäe, Tallinn (1972)
- Tallinn Central Post Office annex (1995)
- Linnahall renovation project (2006)

== Awards ==
- 1976 Award of the USSR Council of Ministers (as part of a group of employees of different institutions that designed and built the Mustamäe residential district)
- 1978 Merited Architect of the Estonian SSR
- 1981 USSR Medal of Honour
- 1983 Main prize and gold medal at the International Union of Architects (UIA) "Interarch '83" congress (Tallinn Linnahall)
- 1984 USSR State Prize (Tallinn Linnahall)
- 2006 Annual Award of the Cultural Endowment of Estonia

== Personal exhibitions ==
- "Architect Raine Karp", 2006 in the Museum of Estonian Architecture
- „Evenings at home. Architect Raine Karp's private houses and summer homes", Exhibition from June 17 to August 21, 2016 in the Museum of Estonian Architecture.

== Literature ==
- Raine Karp, Mait Väljas "Architect Raine Karp" 2016, Tallinn, Museum of Estonian Architecture. ISBN 9789949967957
