= List of cinemas in Estonia =

In 2023, there were 2.82 million visits to cinemas in Estonia. The country has approximately fifty active cinemas, that collectively have more than eighty screens. Following is an incomplete list of cinemas located in Estonia.

Name	Location (city/town)	Existing years	Further info	Image
Apollo Cinema Tallinn	Tallinn		cinema chain	
Apollo Cinemas Kuressare	Kuressare		cinema chain	
Artis	Tallinn			
Athena	Tartu	2005 –		
Cinamon T1	Tallinn			
Ekraan	Tartu	1961–2021		
Gloria Palace	Tallinn			
Illusion Electric Theater	Tartu	April 4, 1908		
Kino Soprus	Tallinn	1923 –		
Koit	Pääsküla	closed 2021		
Kuressaare Raamatukogu	Kuressaare			
Metropol	Tartu			
Rahu	Tallinn			
Saturn	Tallinn	1913		
Sõprus	Tallinn			
Tartu Elektriteater	Tartu			
