= Mart Port =

Estonian architect

Mart Port (4 January 1922 – 3 February 2012) was an Estonian architect and pedagogue. He was the head of many statutory plans during the Soviet era, including Tallinn, Tartu, Pärnu, Viljandi and Tallinn's districts Mustamäe, Väike-Õismäe and Lasnamäe.

He designed the Viru Hotel (1968–1972), the building of the Central Committee of the Communist Party of Estonia (now the Ministry of Foreign Affairs; with Raine Karp, Uno Tölpus and Olga Kontšajeva, 1966–1968), the "Planners' House" (Rävala pst 8; with Peep Jänes and Arvo Niineväli, 1965–1981) and the World War II Memorial in Maarjamäe (with Allan Murdmaa, Peep Jänes, Henno Sepmann and Rein Kersten, 1959–1960).

== Biography ==
Mart Port was born in Pärnu, a son of botanist Jaan Port (1891–1950) and his wife Marta. In World War II Mart was mobilized to the Red Army. In 1950 he finished his architecture studies at the Tallinn Polytechnical Institute. 1955–1979 he served as the chairman of the Union of Soviet Estonian Architects. Until 1990, Mart Port worked at the Soviet architectural bureau "Eesti Projekt", from 1961 to 1989 he served as its chief architect. He also worked as a docent at the State Art Institute of the ESSR from 1961 to 1992, and since 1977 as a professor. In 1972 he received the State Prize of the Estonian SSR, and in 1978 the title of People's Architect of the USSR.

Mart Port's son is sports biologist Kristjan Port (born 1960).

Mart Port died in Tallinn at the age of 90 on 3 February 2012 after a sudden illness.

== Gallery ==
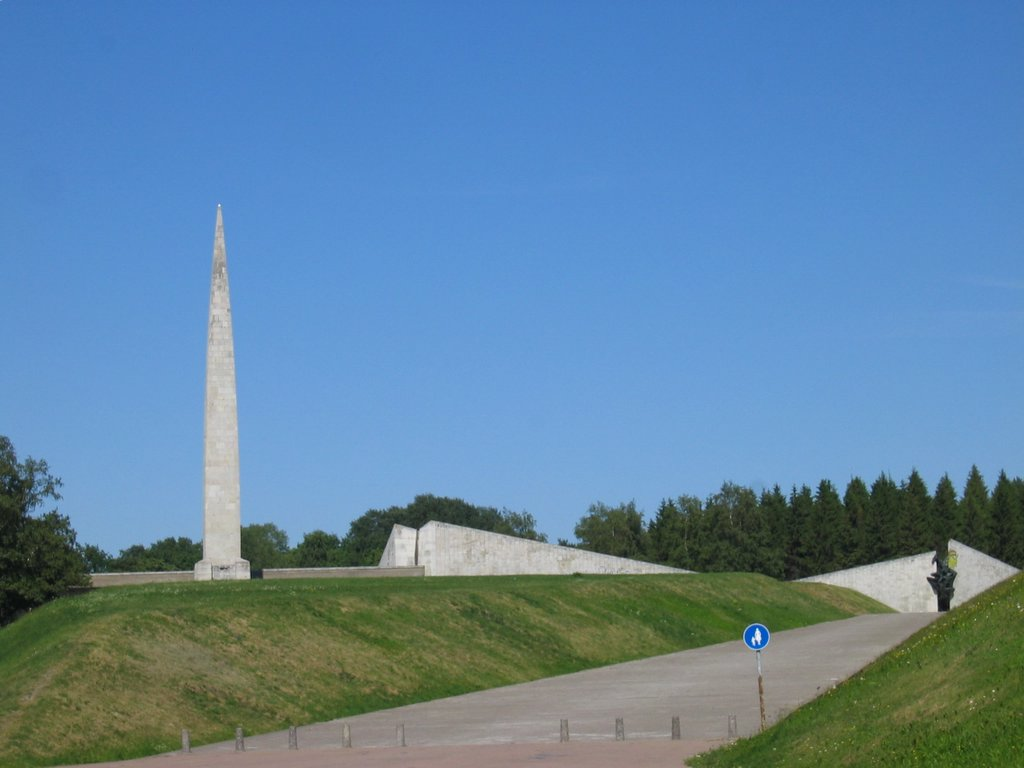
World War II memorial in Maarjamäe

Preceded by ?	Chairman of the Union of Soviet Estonian Architects; 1955–1979	Succeeded by Voldemar Herkel
