= Eduard Ahrens =

Baltic-German clergyman and linguist

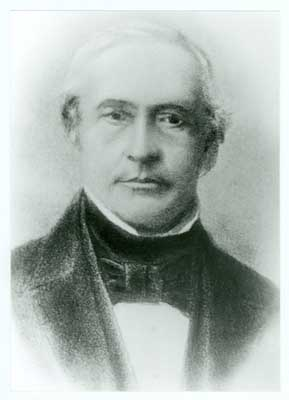
Eduard Ahrens

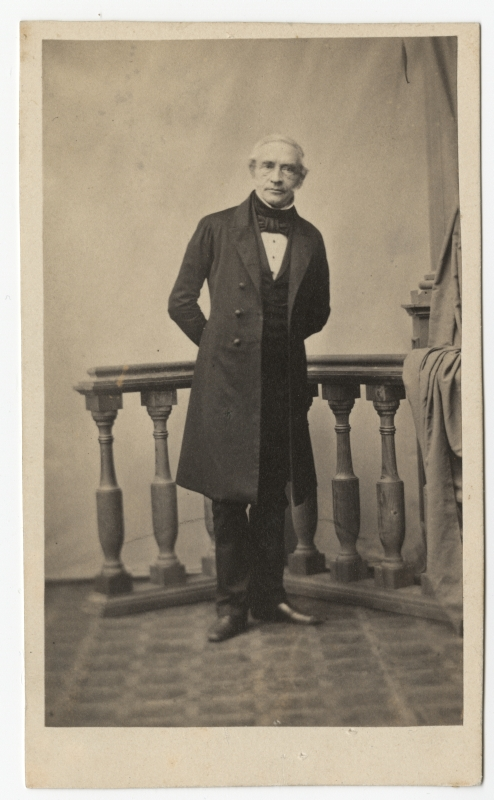
Eduard Ahrens, 1860–1863, as photographed by Charles Borchardt

Eduard Ahrens (3 April 1803, Tallinn (Reval) – 19 February 1863, Kuusalu, Estonia) was a Baltic German Estonian language linguist and clergyman.

Ahrens studied at Tallinn Cathedral School from 1811 to 1819, and, from 1820 to 1823, at the Faculty of Theology of the University of Tartu. After graduating from university, he could not hold a pastor's office because he was too young (the pastors were to be at least 25 years old), so in 1824 he went to Pikavere manor, where he worked for about 8 years. In 1831, Ahrens revised the pro ministerio exam at the Estonian Consistory. In 1832, he went to study in Germany and also visited France. On returning to Estonia, he again returned to home-schooling at Vana-Vigala (with the Sievers family). Ahrens held sermons in the Vigala church in Estonian.

Ahrens was called in 1837 to be the teacher of the Laurentius congregation in Kuusalu. He was ordained a pastor on 12 September 1837. In March 1860, he was a part of the East Harju congregation.

In 1843, he modified the grammar of the Estonian language in the Grammatik der Ehstnischen Sprache Revalschen Dialektes (Grammar of the Estonian language in Tallinn, 2, revised edition 1853). Because of this work, he is considered to be the creator of modern Estonian orthography. The reason for his writing reforms was the desire to make reading the liturgical texts of the church easier.

Ahrens noticed a widening gap between the popular language and the church language as a church teacher. At the beginning of the 19th century, most of the church teachers were Germans and, on the Bible, supported German and Latin grammar. Ahrens wanted to make the church more popular.

In 1853, a second edition of his grammar book was published, with sentence instruction. Ahrens proposed to switch from the old writing system to a Finnish orthography that was better suited to pronunciation in Estonian, dubbed the Newer Orthography. His recommended new writing began to spread in the 1860s.

Ahrens was a devout religious figure in social life, and the secular literature published in Estonia remained alien to him. The main purpose of Ahrens's linguistic activity was to study and improve Estonian liturgical language.

== Eduard Ahrens and Elias Lönnrot ==
In 1844, Elias Lönnrot, the author of the Kalevala, met with Ahrens in Kuusalu. This visit is marked by a wall plate placed on the front door of the Kuusalu pastorate. The folk tradition of how "the great Finnish gentleman and the pastor of Kuusalu" are listening to the song of the villagers of Muuksi village is preserved.

== Legacy ==
- During the Soviet occupation of Estonia, the church traditions had broken apart and the epitaph on Ahrens' tomb were replaced only by his contributions to Estonian linguistics, instead of the examples of Latin and German that implied his religious activities. This attitude acquired special significance, since at the end of the 1970s the authorities attempted to introduce the concept of bilingualism and set Russian as the first priority instead of the Estonian language. This ironic parallelism between two mindsets is reflected in the Kalle Kurg poem "Leid".
- The Laurentius Society, operating in Kuusalu, decided to set up a memorial to Ahrens. Aivar Simson and Paul Männ's bronze statue won the design contest in 2011. Then the Laurentius Society started to launch a pan-Estonian fund collection to capture the memory of the innovator of the orthography of the Estonian language. On August 10, 2013, the granite monument for Ahrens was opened with the money collected. By 1 October 2016, donations totaled €22,133 for the memorial, with donations of €57,465 by 15 April 2017. The money collection ended and the Eduard Ahrens Memorial was officially opened on 10 August 2017, in front of the old church of Kuusalu.
- In August 2017, a language conference dedicated to Ahrens was organized by the Laurentius Society, the Institute of the Estonian Language, the Mother Tongue Society and the Learned Estonian Society for writing in the Estonian language.

== Works ==
- Johann Hornung, der Schöpfer unserer Ehstnischen Kirchensprache 1845
- Sprachfehler der Ehstnischen Bibel 1853
- Grammatik der Ehstnischen Sprache Revalschen Dialektes 1853
