= List of members of the Supreme Soviet of the Estonian Soviet Socialist Republic, 1980–1985 =

This is a list of members of the tenth legislature of the Supreme Soviet of the Estonian Soviet Socialist Republic which was the Estonian Soviet Socialist Republic's legislative chamber between 1940 and 1941, and between 1944 and 1992. The session ran from 24 February 1980 to 24 February 1985, and followed the 1980 Estonian Supreme Soviet election in which only Bloc of Communists and Non-Party Candidates was the only party able to contest the elections.

== List of members ==
Source: Jaan Toomla, Valitud ja Valitsenud: Eesti parlamentaarsete ja muude esinduskogude ning valitsuste isikkoosseis aastail 1917–1999 (National Library of Estonia, 1999), pp. 109–113.

Name	Party	Notes
Aili Aben	NLKP	
Maido Agur	NLKP	Elected on 01.07.1984
Alar Ainumäe	NLKP	
Rain Alberg	-, NLKP	
Tamara Alenina		
Leonid Alihver	-, NLKP	
Zoja Aljohhina		
Ülo Aller		
Luule Allika	NLKP	
Leonid Ananitš	NLKP	
Juhan Arak	ÜLKNÜ	
Nikolai Bardin	NLKP	
Vladimir Beekman	NLKP	
Vladimir Belov	ÜLKNÜ	
Ljubov Botšarnikova	NLKP	
Aleksandr Botšin	NLKP	
Antonina Brilliantova		
Vladimir Bussel	NLKP	
Roman Butel	NLKP	
Nikolai Dudkin	NLKP	
Enn Ehala	NLKP	
Elle Eier (Riis)	ÜLKNÜ	
Silvia Ein		
Galina Einard		
Elve Eisenberg	NLKP	
Valter Eks	NLKP	
Hillar Eller	NLKP	
Urve Elmi	NLKP	
Rein Elvak	NLKP	
Albert Essenson	NLKP	
Jevgeni Filatov	NLKP	
Ljubov Fjodorova		
Viivi Freirik		
Antonina Frolova	ÜLKNÜ	
Nikolai Ganjušov	NLKP	
Sergei Gladõšev	NLKP	Left office on 16.12.1983
Arnold Green	NLKP	
Elsa Gretškina	NLKP	
Valentina Gromkina	NLKP	
Pjotr Gromov	NLKP	Died in office on 07.01.1981
Valter Hallmägi	NLKP	
Jüri Hansson		
Ljudmilla Hartsova		
Ülle Haviko (Jõgi)	ÜLKNÜ	
Liivi Heamets		
Anna Holdblom	ÜLKNÜ, NLKP	
Katrin llison (Ujuk)	ÜLKNÜ	
Valentina Iljina	ÜLKNÜ	
Harald Ilves	NLKP	
Kaarel Ird	NLKP	
Valentina Ivanova		
Endel Jaama	NLKP	
Ellen Jaanikesing		
Jüri Järve		
Tatjana Kafilova	ÜLKNÜ	
Lembit Kaik	NLKP	
Aleksei Kalamajev		
Andres Kalberg		
Arvo Kaarna	NLKP	
Ilmar Kallas	NLKP	
Heino Kallaste	NLKP	
Lea Kalma	NLKP	
Saima Kammer		
Aino Karetnikova		
Tatjana Kartašova	ÜLKNÜ	
Arno Kask	NLKP	
Mare Kask	NLKP	
Tatjana Kazakova	ÜLKNÜ	
Maimu Kausmees		
Kaljo Kiisk	NLKP	
Üllar Kiisla	NLKP	
Georgi Kimask	NLKP	
Karl Kimmel	NLKP	
Roomet Kiudmaa	NLKP	
Elle Kivi	NLKP	
Adu Kivilaan		
Elmar Klausen		
Valter Klauson (Klaussen)	NLKP	
Vladimir Klauson	NLKP	
Tatjana Klimtšuk (Plehhova)	ÜLKNÜ	
Vassili Konstantinov	NLKP	
Valjo Koort	NLKP	
Niina Kornienko (Kornijenko)	-, NLKP	
Rosalia Kotalainen	NLKP	
Riivo Kotkas	ÜLKNÜ	
Villu Kottisse	NLKP	
Jüri Kraft	NLKP	
Kaljo Kroll	NLKP	
Klavdija Krištal		
Garald Kruger	NLKP	
Hendrik Krumm	NLKP	
Juri Krõlov	NLKP	
Aleksandr Kudrjavtsev	NLKP	Elected on 19.09.1982
Allan Kullaste	NLKP	
Tiiu Kõiv	ÜLKNÜ	
Johannes Käbin	NLKP	
Tõnu Känd		
Vladimir Käo	NLKP	
Leonora Kääramees	NLKP	
Arno Köörna	NLKP	
Ääre Külaots	NLKP	
Alfred Kütt	NLKP	
Luule Läägus	NLKP	
Endel Laane		
Enda Lääniste		
Mati Laaring		
Marika Laiuste	ÜLKNÜ	
Ants Laos	NLKP	
Anatoli Laptev	NLKP	
Konstantin Lebedev	NLKP	Left office on 16.08.1982
Endel Lemsaar		
Leonid Lentsman	NLKP	Elected on 03.06.1984
Maia Leosk	NLKP	
Ants Licht	NLKP	
Elmar Liivakivi	NLKP	
Vella Lilleberg	ÜLKNÜ	
Vello Lind	NLKP	Elected on 09.08.1981
Maie Lodi (Oinas)	NLKP	
Johannes Lott	NLKP	
Helle Lubi	NLKP	
Harri Lumi	NLKP	
Riita Luukas	NLKP	
Henn Lõmps	NLKP	
Viktor Maamägi	NLKP	
Ene Maasikmäe		
Ago Madik	NLKP	
Hugo Maide	NLKP	
Rudolf Mannov	NLKP	
Elmar Matt	NLKP	
Valentina Meet	-, NLKP	
Arnold Meri	NLKP	
Otto Merimaa	NLKP	
Roman-Robert Merisalu	NLKP	
Johannes Mets	NLKP	
Mall Metsamaa	NLKP	
Mare Mikk	ÜLKNÜ	
Larissa Ministrova	NLKP	
Olga Mohnatšjova (Kovaljova)	ÜLKNÜ	
Anatoli Moskovtsev		
Ene Muri	ÜLKNÜ	
Lidia Murtazina	NLKP	
Artur Möls	ÜLKNÜ	
Endel Mändmaa	NLKP	
Harald Männik	NLKP	
Elle Müür		
Rimma Naumova	NLKP	
Ülo Niisuke	NLKP	
Aarne Niit	NLKP	
Jevgeni Nikolajev	NLKP	
Silvi Noormets	ÜLKNÜ	
Albert Norak	NLKP	
Sirje Nõrk	ÜLKNÜ	
Ilmar Nuut	NLKP	
Ülo Nõmm	NLKP	
Ain Oraste	ÜLKNÜ	
Valentin Orehhov		
Endel Paap	NLKP	
Peeter Palu	NLKP	
Zoja Parfenova (Parfjonova)	ÜLKNÜ	
Heino Parik	NLKP	
August Pedajas	NLKP	
Matti Pedak	NLKP	
Elmu Peek	NLKP	
Tiiä Peelmaa		
Raimond Penu	NLKP	
Eha Perli	ÜLKNÜ	
Elviira Peusse	NLKP	
Endel Pihelgas	NLKP	
Taimi Pihlakas		
Vello Piil		
Liidia Piirsalu		
Milvi Pikla	NLKP	
Aldur Pitk	NLKP	
Adolf Popov	NLKP	
Veniamin Porõvkin	NLKP	
Nikolai Freiman	NLKP	
Helle Preinvalts		
Leonhard Puksa	NLKP	
Mai Poides		
Haare Põldmaa	NLKP	
Aksel Põldroo	NLKP	
Maie Põlluäär		
Elve Raadik	NLKP	
Dina Raaga (Borissova)	ÜLKNÜ	
Lea Rannik		
Maimu Rannu	ÜLKNÜ	
Mai Reinsalu		
Urmas Remmik	ÜLKNÜ	
Vladimir Renser	NLKP	
Rein Ristlaan	NLKP	
Semjon Romanov	NLKP	Died in office on 19.05.1984
Välde Roosmaa	NLKP	
Jüri Räim	NLKP	
Väino Rätsep	NLKP	
Jaan Rääts	NLKP	
Arnold Rüütel	NLKP	
Liivi Saar	NLKP	
Maret Saar	NLKP	
August Saaremägi	NLKP	
Margit Saarsoo	NLKP	
Ljubov Safonova		
Endel Saia	NLKP	
Reet Säkk	ÜLKNÜ	
Erika Sakkool	-, NLKP	
Udo Saks	NLKP	
Rein Sallo	NLKP	
Ilme Sander (Uibuaed)	NLKP	
Gustav Sarri	NLKP	
Rein Satsi		
Bruno Saul	NLKP	
Einar Savisaar	NLKP	
Vladimir Sentjabov		
Lüa Sepp	NLKP	
Galina Sevostjanova (Jander)	NLKP	
Genrich Sikorski	NLKP	
Erki Silvet	NLKP	
Robert Simson	NLKP	
Illar Sinimäe		
Mihkel Sistok	NLKP	
Oleg Smirnov	NLKP	
Ain Seidla	NLKP	Elected on 15.03.1981
Sirje Soilts (Randrüüt)		
Juta Soo		
Maie Soodla	NLKP	
Sergei Stõtšinski	NLKP	
Svetlana Suhhantseva (Kopõlova)	ÜLKNÜ	
Jüri Suurhans	NLKP	Died in office on 11.03.1984
Marta Svetlakova	NLKP	
Feliks Šalavin	NLKP	
Jadviga Šangarejeva	ÜLKNÜ	
Roman Šeremeta	NLKP	
Aleksei Šiškin	NLKP	
Lev Šišov	NLKP	
Aleksandr Zamahhin	NLKP	
Boriss Žilkin		
Nikolai Žukov	NLKP	
Arvo Taal	NLKP	
Ülo Tambet	NLKP	
Boris Tamm	NLKP	
Kadrin Tamm	NLKP	
Vivo Tamm	NLKP	
Aino Tammeorg	NLKP	
Leonhard Tammeväli	NLKP	
Heino Teder	NLKP	
Marko Tibar	NLKP	
Vilja Tikk	NLKP	
Uno Tinits	NLKP	
Rein Tobreluts	NLKP	
Kuno Todeson	NLKP	
Helve Toiga	ÜLKNÜ	
Henno Toming	NLKP	
Arnold Toome	NLKP	
Indrek Toome	NLKP	
Jaan Tooming	NLKP	
Erhard Toots	NLKP	
Ilmar Tom	NLKP	
Ivan Tovstõženko	NLKP	
Anatoli Tregubov	NLKP	
Vassili Tšehhonatski		
Eduard Tšerevaško	NLKP	
Vladimir Tšernõšev	NLKP	
Valeri Tšetvergov	NLKP	
Tiina Tullus	NLKP	
Genrich Turonok	NLKP	
Gustav Tõnspoeg	NLKP	Elected on 04.03.1984
Valter Udam	NLKP	
Natalja Unt (Dubina)	-, NLKP	
Artur-Bernhard Upsi	NLKP	
Milvi Ustinova	ÜLKNÜ	
Gennadi Utkin		
Olaf-Knut Utt	NLKP	
Viktor Vaht	NLKP	
Roomet Vahtras		
Karl Vaino	NLKP	
Helle Valkiainen (Kamara)	ÜLKNÜ	
Meta Vannas (Jangolenko)	NLKP	
Pjotr Vassikov	NLKP	
Uno Veeperv	NLKP	
Heino Veldi	NLKP	
Viljar Veskiväli	NLKP	
Vello Vilimaa	NLKP	
Vladimir Vinogradov	NLKP	
Donald Visnapuu	NLKP	
Juri Vladõtšin	NLKP	
Galina Vohmjanina	NLKP	
Helbe Vool	NLKP	
Eeva Võngri		
Vaino Väljas	NLKP	
Urmas Õunapuu		
Johannes Üts	NLKP	Died in office on 12.06.1981
