= Ilmastalu =

Village in Estonia

- Village
- Location in Estonia
- Coordinates: 59°26′38″N 25°29′28″E
- Country: Estonia
- County: Harju County
- Municipality: Kuusalu Parish

Population (01.01.2012)
  - Total: 31

Ilmastalu is a village in Kuusalu Parish, Harju County in northern Estonia. It is located on the 43rd km of Tallinn–Narva road (part of E20), just east of Kuusalu. Ilmastalu has a population of 31 (as of 1 January 2012).
