= Vanemuine Concert Hall =

Concert hall in Tartu, Estonia

- Vanemuise kontserdimaja
- Interactive map of Vanemuine Concert Hall
- Address: Vanemuise 6, 51003 Tartu, Estonia
- Location: Tartu, Estonia
- Coordinates: 58°22′36″N 26°43′25″E

The Vanemuine Concert Hall (Estonian: Vanemuise kontserdimaja) is a concert hall in Tartu, Estonia. The hall is located next to the Vanemuine Theatre. The hall is managed by Eesti Kontsert.

The hall was built in 1970. The hall was designed by the architects August Volberg, Peeter Tarvas, and Uno Tölpus. In 1998, the hall was renovated (architect: Avo Kuldkepp). In 2001, an extension was added to the hall.
