= Tallinn University Academic Library =

Library in Tallinn

Coordinates: 59°26′00″N 24°45′12″E

- Estonian: Tallinna Ülikooli Akadeemiline Raamatukogu
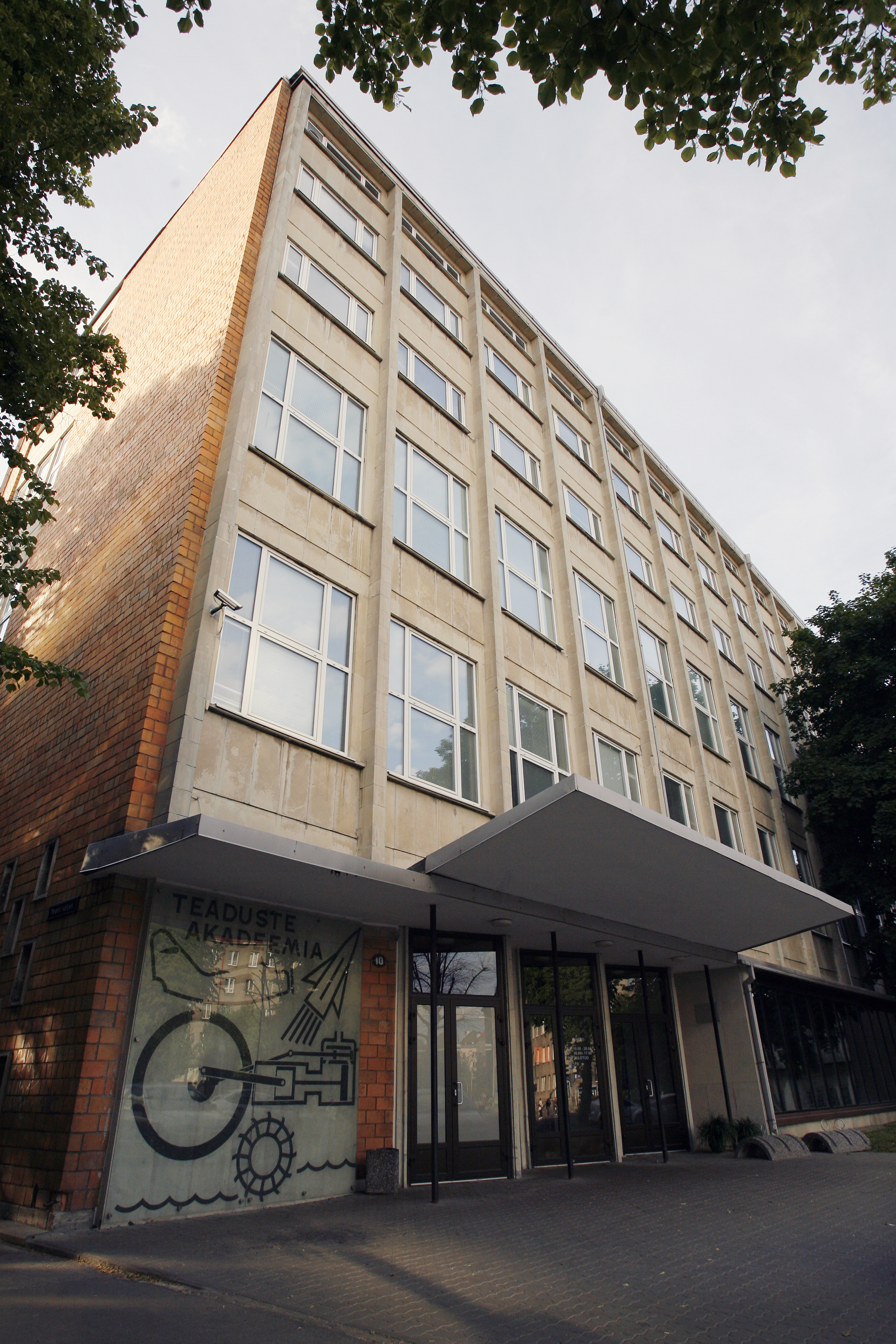
- The main building of Tallinn University Academic Library
- Established: April 1946; 80 years ago

Other information
- Affiliation: Tallinn University

Tallinn University Academic Library (Estonian: Tallinna Ülikooli Akadeemiline Raamatukogu) is a research library in Estonia with many fields of knowledge, except construction and agriculture. It is located in Tallinn, the capital city of Estonia.

The library was founded in April 1946 as the Central Library of the Estonian Academy of Sciences. The main building of the Tallinn University Academic Library was designed by architects Uno Tölpus and Paul Madalik and was built in 1963. Although the library is relatively young, the Library of St. Olaf's Church (founded in 1552) makes up the oldest part of the collections, including 56 incunables dating back to the 15th century and thousands of volumes published between the 16th and 19th centuries. Overall, the library's collection has over 2.6 million physical items. The number of readers is nearly 50,000.

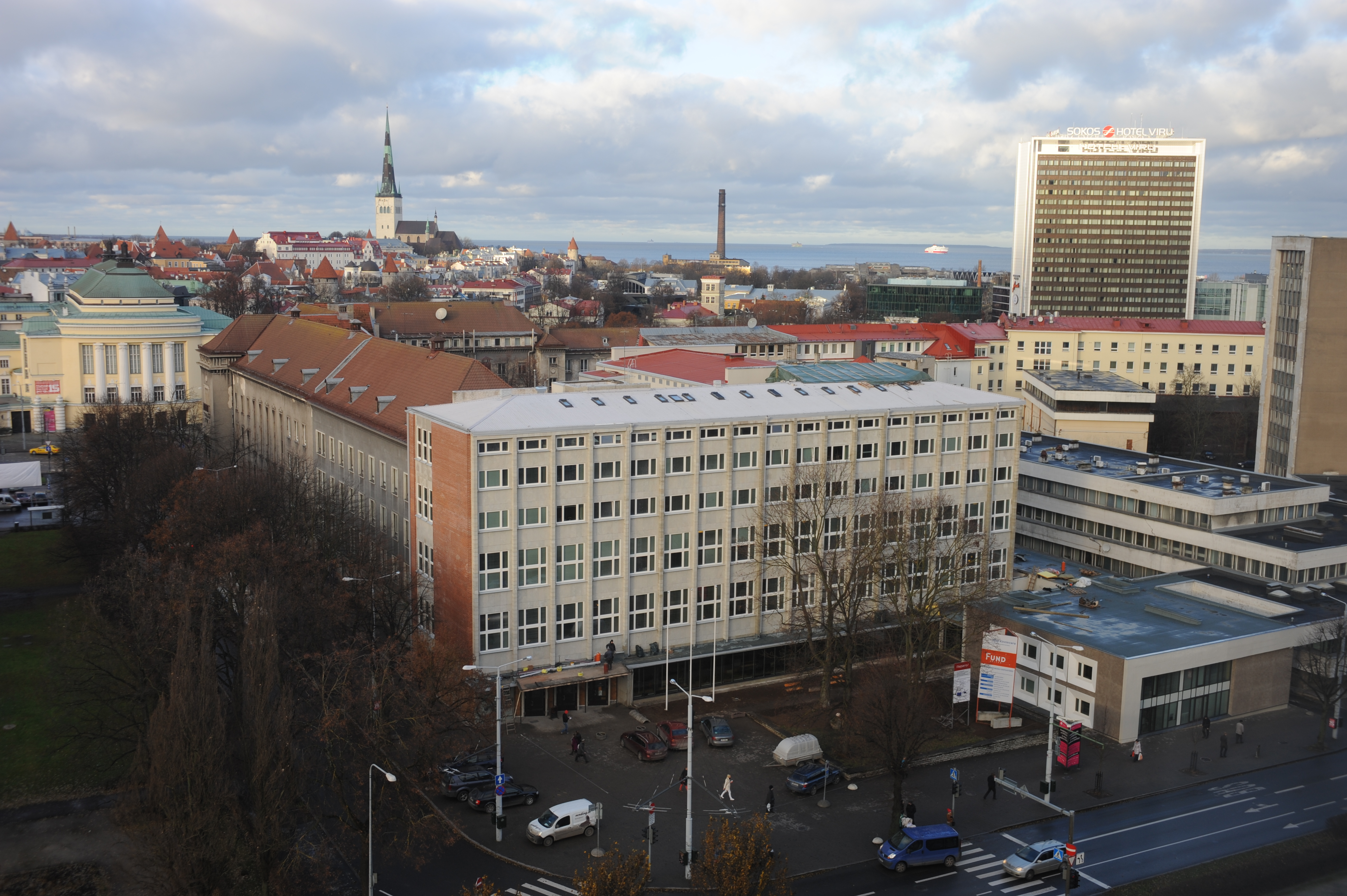
The buildings (six-floor and two-floor) of the library by the Rävala avenue in Tallinn

Over the years the library has gone through several administrative changes. In the 1990s, the library used name Estonian Academic Library (Estonian: Eesti Akadeemiline Raamatukogu). In 2003, the library became a structural unit of Tallinn University.

The library collects and holds printed and other documents published in Estonia, creating as complete collections of these materials as possible. The library is entitled to an obligatory copy of each and every publication issued in Estonia. As one of the founding members of the Estonian Libraries Network Consortium (ELNET Consortium), the library is one of the leaders in the modernisation of the libraries in the digital era.

== Location ==
The main building of the library is situated in the centre of Tallinn, on Rävala puiestee 10. The library has smaller branches by the different colleges of the Tallinn University, including the branches in Haapsalu and Rakvere.

The modernist design of the main building was created by architects Uno Tölpus and Paul Madalik in 1963. The building is under protection as architectural heritage.
