= Ludvig Oskar =

Estonian painter (1874–1951)

- Born: 5 January 1874; Kuusalu, Governorate of Estonia
- Died: 1 June 1951 (aged 77); Varel, West Germany
- Known for: Painting

Ludvig Oskar (5 January 1874 in Kuusalu, Estonia – 1 June 1951 in Varel, Germany) was an Estonian painter.

He started his art studies in 1903, while artist Ants Laikmaa opened his studio school. In addition to studio classes Oskar took watercolor classes with Karl Winkler. After studies abroad he taught at Tallinna Reaalkool (Science High School of Tallinn). Among his students was Evald Okas.

In 1926 he decided to fix Pika Jala Väravatorn (the gate tower named Long Leg at the medieval city wall of Tallinn). For this purpose he took a bank loan of half a million Estonian marks (5,000 Estonian kroons) and reconstructed the tower. Oskar demolished the old mantel chimney and built to each floor ovens and stoves.

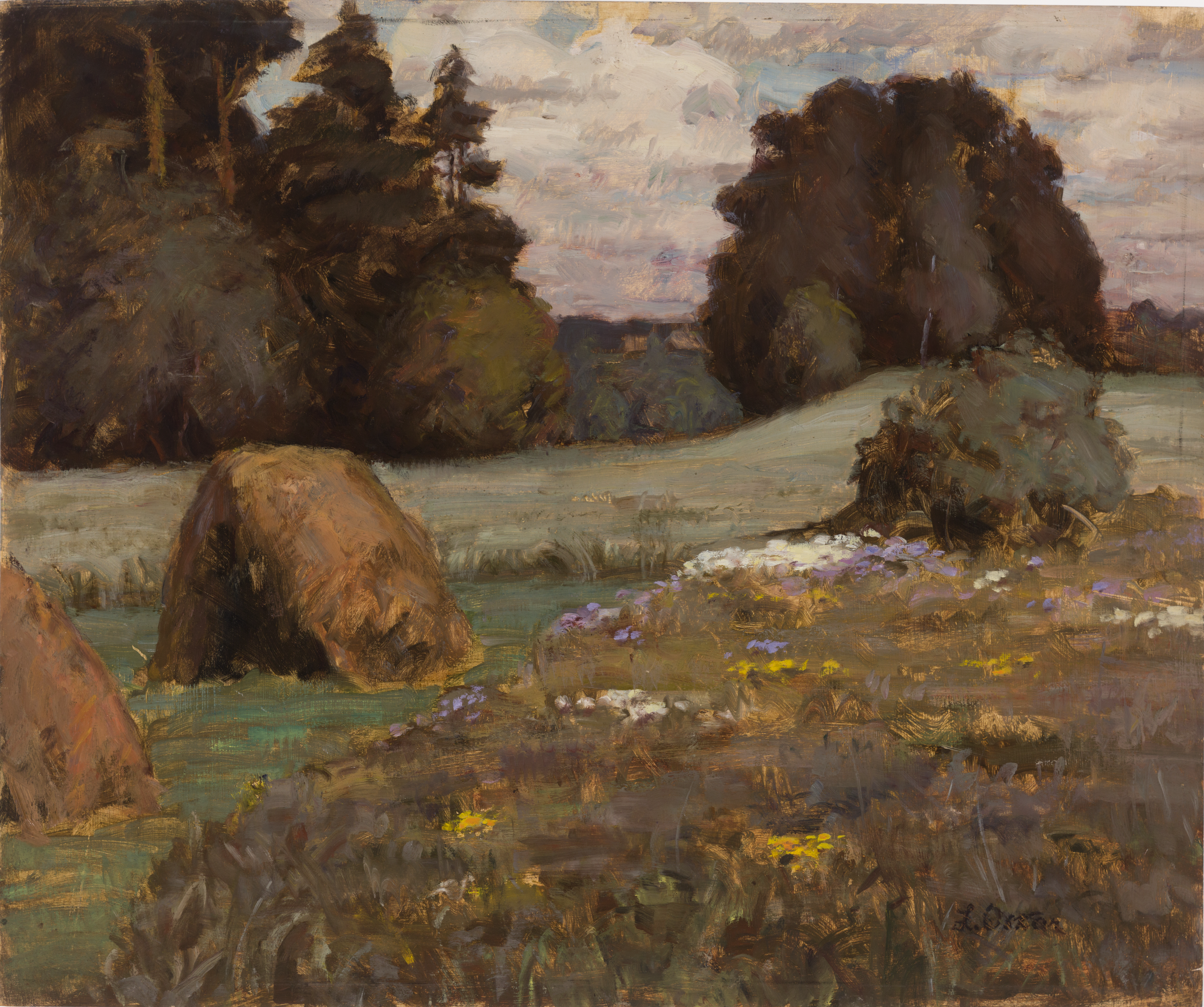
"Landscape" (1930s), Tartu Art Museum

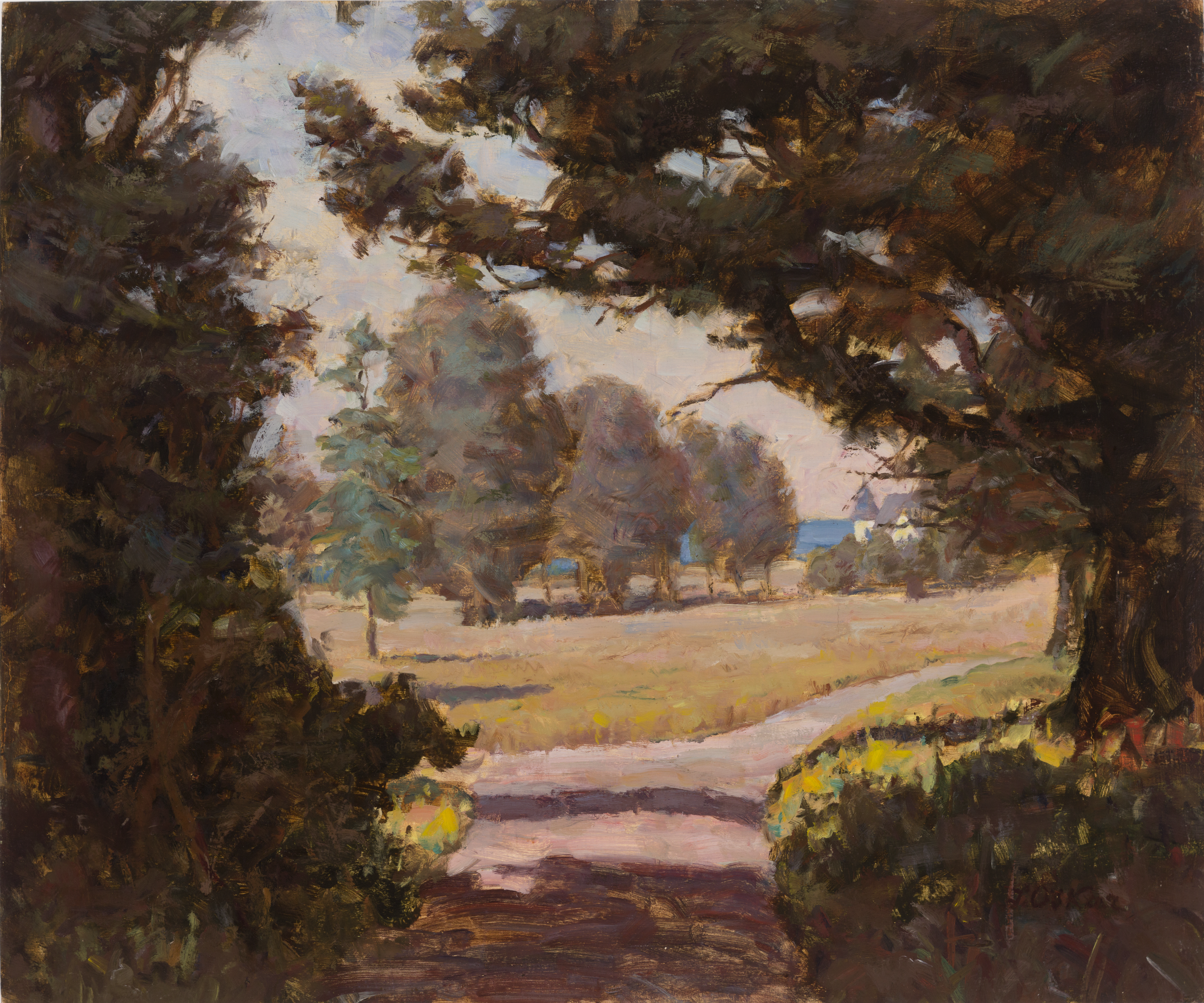
"Kadriorg" (1940), Tartu Art Museum

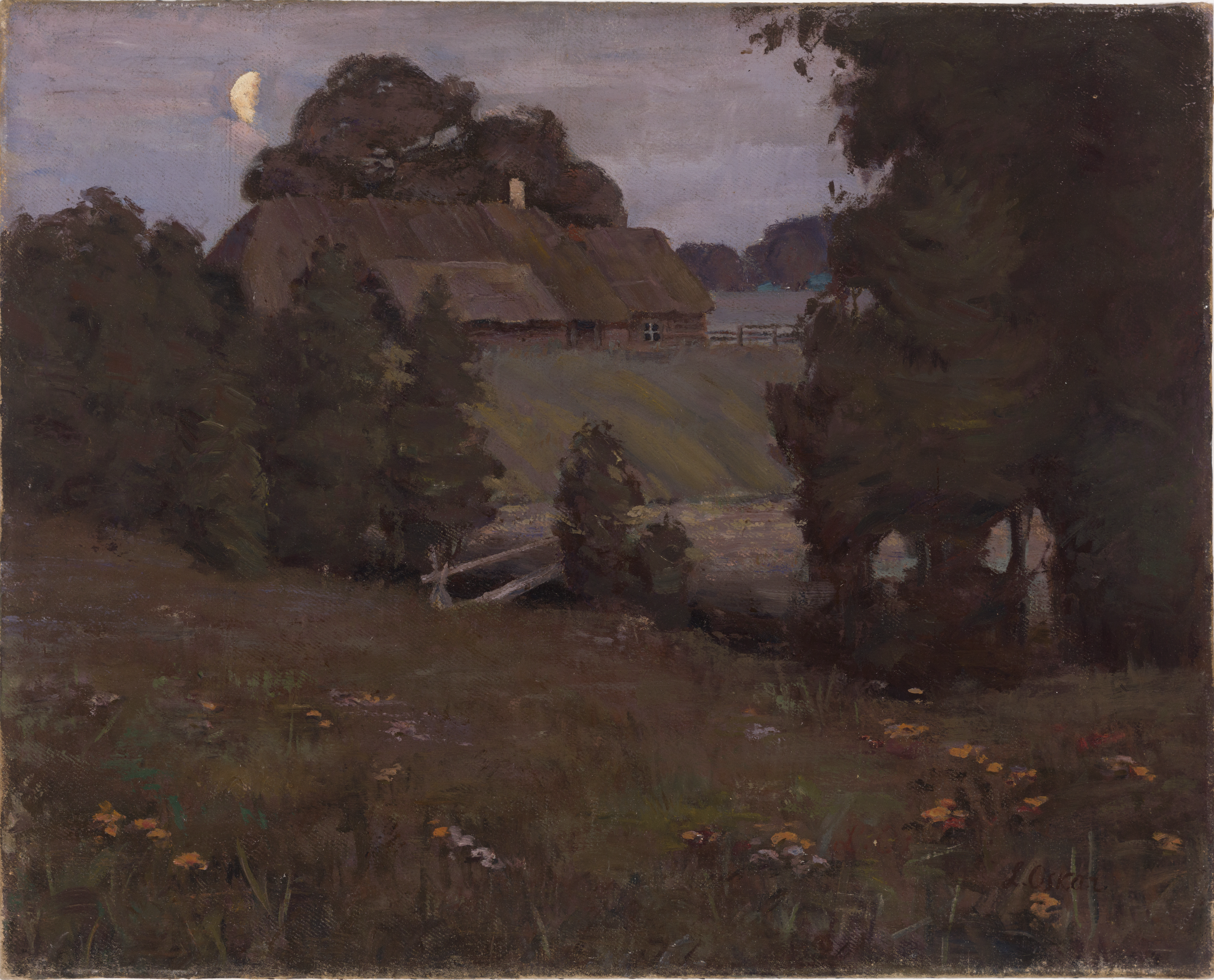
"Landscape with a farmhouse and a moon", Tartu Art Museum
