= 1980 Estonian Supreme Soviet election =

1980 elections in Estonian SSR

Elections to the Supreme Soviet of the Estonian SSR were held on 24 February 1980. The Bloc of Communists and Non-Party Candidates was the only party able to contest the elections, and won all 285 seats.

== Results ==
Party	Votes	%	Seats
Bloc of Communists and Non-Party Candidates		99.89	285
Against		0.11	–
Total			285
Registered voters/turnout		99.99	
Source: Liivik

== See also ==
- List of members of the Supreme Soviet of the Estonian Soviet Socialist Republic, 1980–1985
