= Peeter Tarvas =

Estonian architect

Peeter Tarvas (until 1940 Treumann; 6 January 1916, in Kuressaare – 23 March 1987, in Tallinn) was an Estonian architect and professor.

From 1935 until 1940, he studied at Brno University of Technology. From 1944 until 1957, he worked at the architectural bureau Eesti Projekt. In 1949, he was awarded the title of associate professor by a decision of the Higher Attestation Commission of the Ministry of Higher and Secondary Special Education of the USSR. During the period between 1945 and 1954, he taught at the Tallinn Polytechnical Institute, and from 1947 until in 1987, he was a professor at the Estonian SSR State Art Institute faculty (including from 1962 until 1964, the head of the department of architecture, and as vice-rector from 1961 until 1987). Tarvas published articles in Sirp ja Vasar, contributed to the compilation of the Almanac of Architects of the Estonian SSR and gave presentations within the framework of the Union of Architects of the Estonian SSR.

Awards:

- 1962: Estonian SSR merited artistic personnel

== Works ==
- 1955: cinema Sõprus (with August Volberg)
- Kalev Sports Hall
- 1957-1968: Vanemuine Theatre (with Henno Kalmet, August Volberg and Uno Tölpus)

== Gallery ==
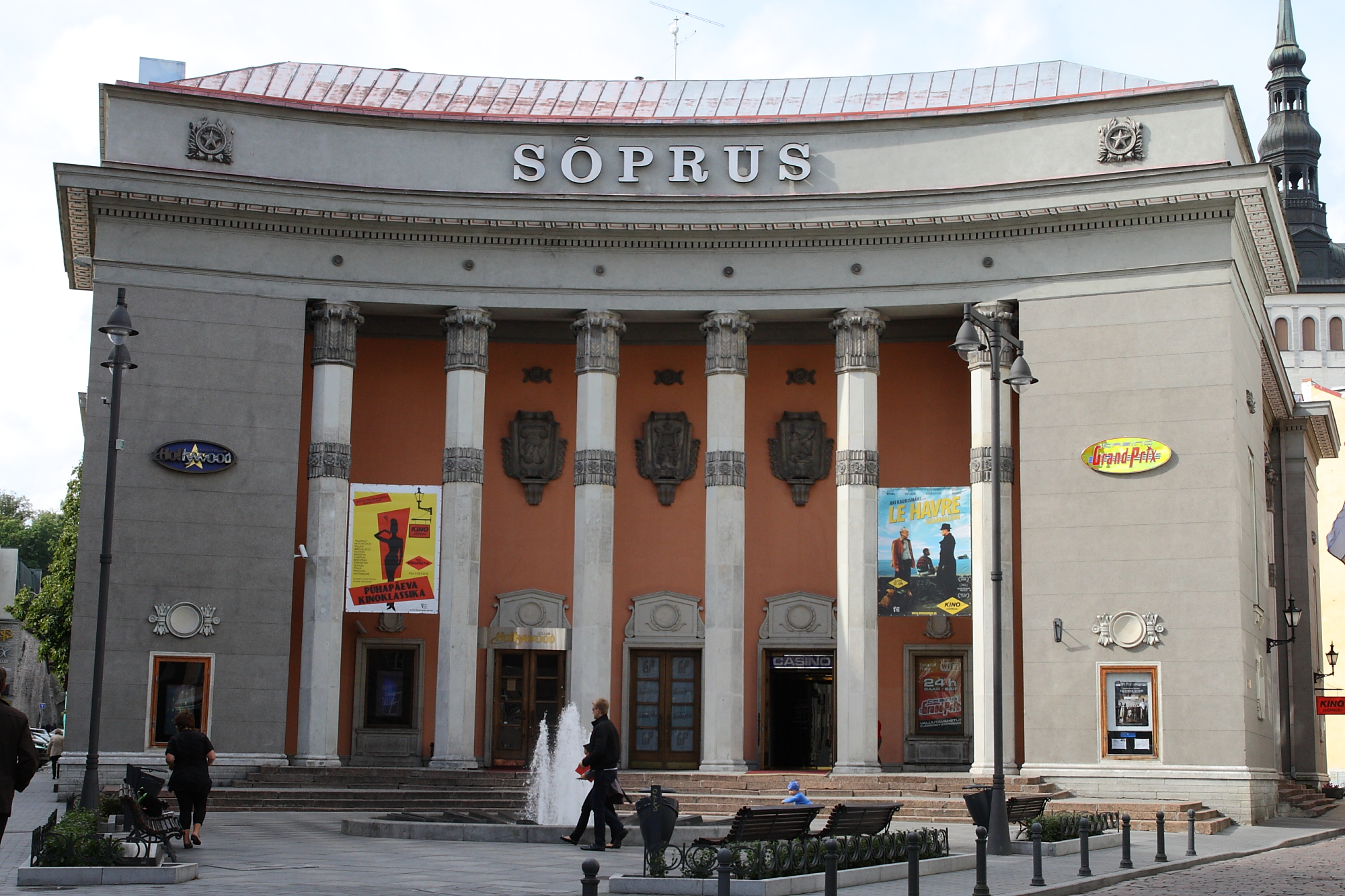
cinema Sõprus

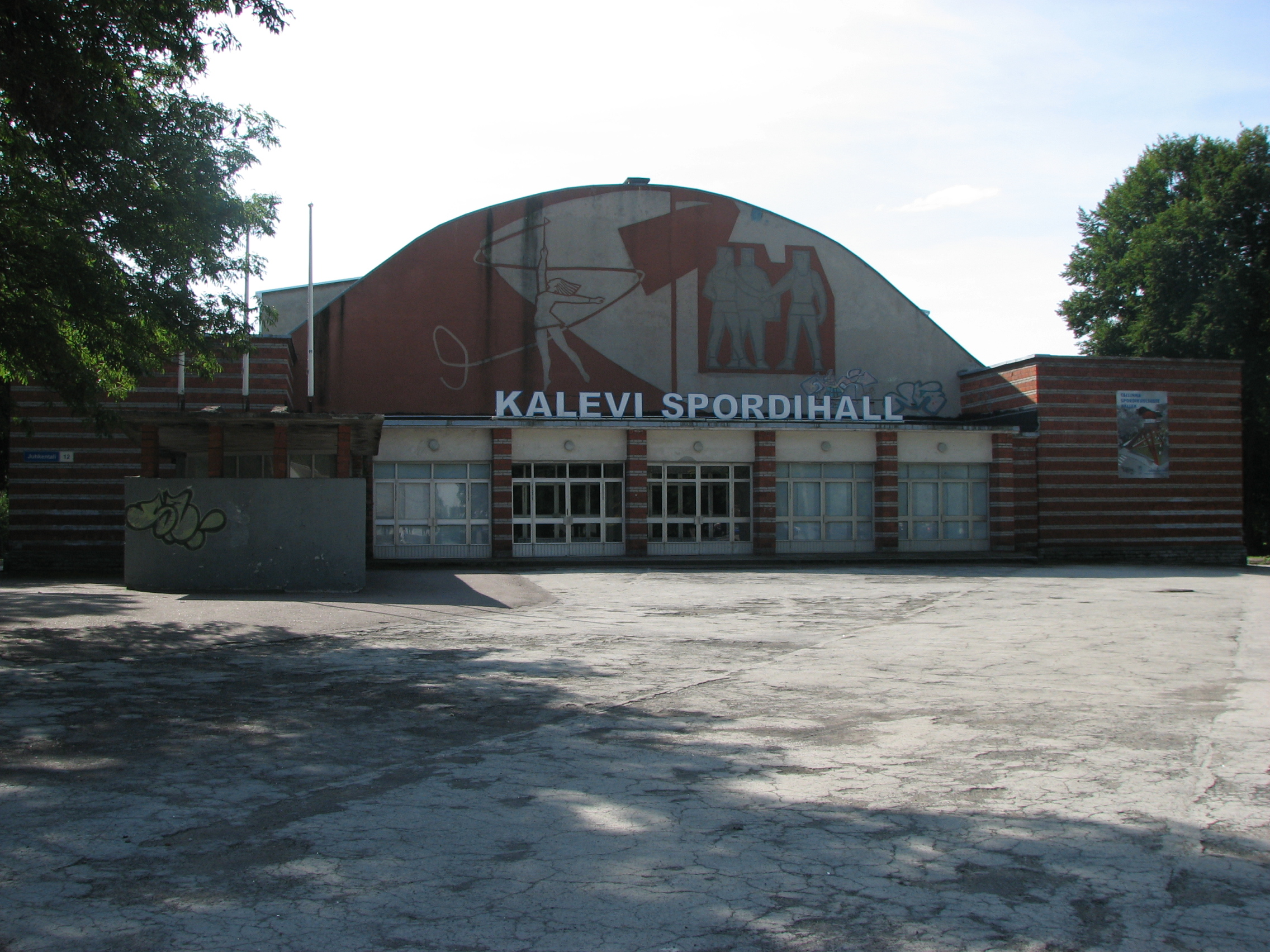
Kalev Sports Hall

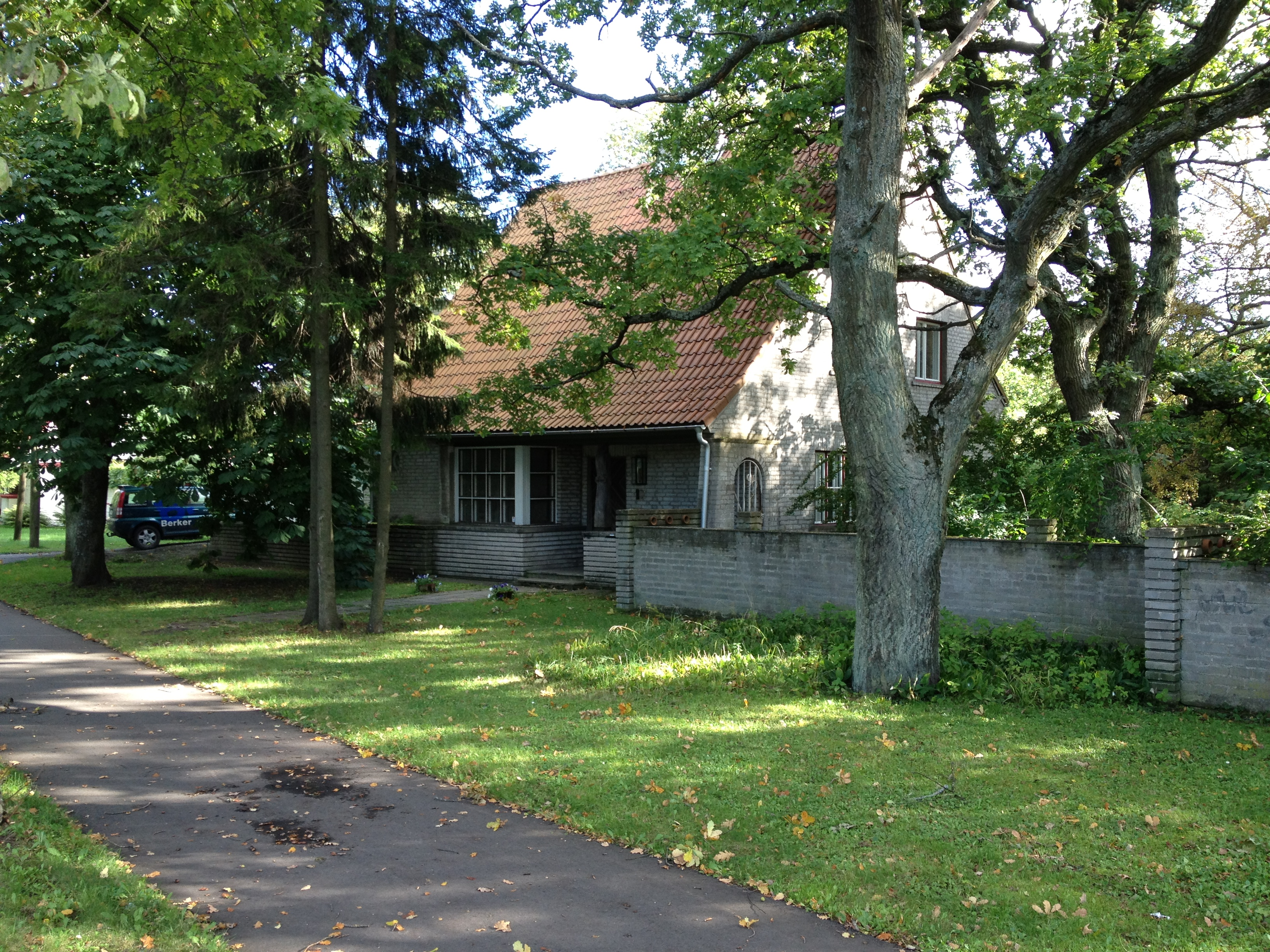
Peeter Tarvas' home house
