= Raamatukogu =

Estonian magazine

- First issue: 1923

Raamatukogu is an Estonian magazine published in Tallinn, Estonia by Estonian Librarians Association and Estonian National Library.

First number was issued in 1923.

1964-1967 it was issued under the name "Huvitavat raamatukogude tööst".
