= National Library of Estonia =

- Eesti Rahvusraamatukogu
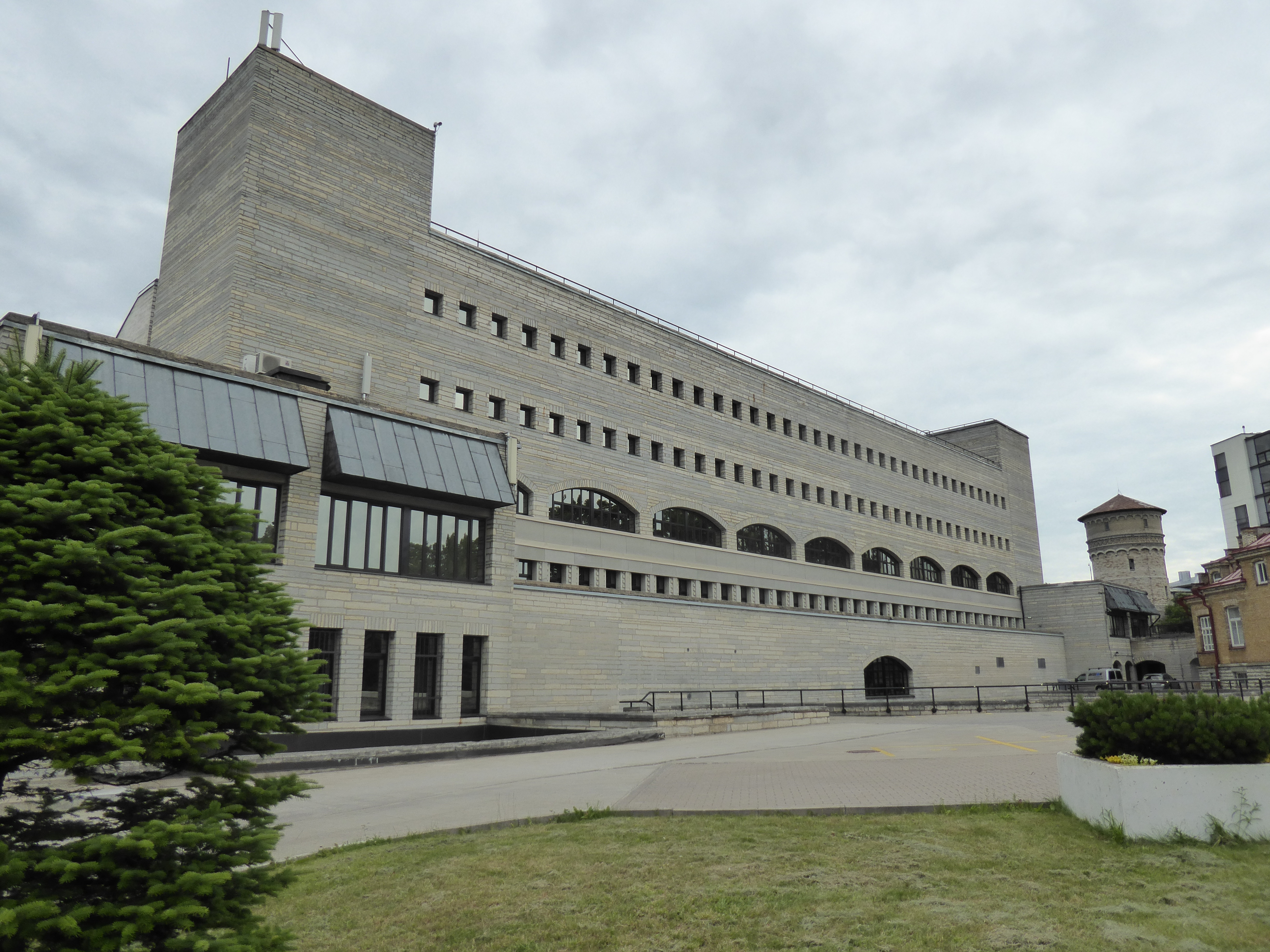
- 59°26′16″N 24°45′49″E
- Location: Temporary premises Narva mnt 11, Tallinn, Estonia
- Type: Public, National, Research, Parliamentary library
- Established: 1918 (108 years ago)

Collection
- Size: 3.4 million items (2007)
- Legal deposit: Yes, since 1919

Access and use
- Access requirements: Open to anyone of 16 years or older, parent's permission is necessary if younger, library card required to pass the gate

Other information
- Budget: 5.6 million Euro
- Director: Martin Öövel
- Employees: 314
- Website: Official website

The National Library of Estonia (Estonian: Eesti Rahvusraamatukogu) is a national public institution in Estonia, which operates pursuant to the National Library of Estonia Act (Estonian: Eesti Rahvusraamatukogu seadus). It was established as the parliamentary library (Estonian: parlamendiraamatukogu) of Estonia on December 21, 1918.

According to the act, the National Library of Estonia is the custodian of Estonian national memory and heritage, and acts as the repository centre of the Estonian literature and national bibliography, the main information provider for the Estonian parliament and many other constitutional institutions, a national centre of library and information sciences, a site for the continuing education of librarians, and also as a cultural centre.

From 1984 to 1991, Ivi Eenmaa was the Director of the National Library and from 1991 to 1998 the Director General. From 1998 to 2008, Tiiu Valm was the Director General. From 2008 to 2023, the Director General of the National Library was Janne Andresoo. In 2023 Martin Öövel was elected as the head of the National Library.

== Functions ==
The National Library of Estonia is:

- a national library, collecting, storing and making publicly accessible the documents published in Estonia or about Estonia, regardless of their place of publication, maintaining national databases of the Estonian national bibliography and statistics on Estonian print output, serving as the Estonian ISSN, ISBN and ISMN agency;
- a parliamentary library, providing information services for the Riigikogu, the Government of the Republic, the Office of the President of the Republic, and state authorities;
- a research library, providing information for research activities in humanities and social sciences, and various information services;
- a library research and development centre, providing library and information science information, coordinating research, and development activities and library standardisation in Estonia, organising user surveys, and training, and further professional training for the staff of Estonian libraries, publishing materials on library and book science and the Estonian library journal, Raamatukogu, organising national surveys of library statistics and actively participating in international library co-operation;
- a cultural centre, where various book and art exhibitions are held, along with conferences, concerts, theatre performances, movie evenings and other cultural activities.

== Information services ==
The National Library of Estonia provides information services in the following fields:

- humanities: history, ethnology, philosophy, folklore, psychology, religion, culture, linguistics and literary science, Estonian and foreign literature, art, music, film, theatre, etc.
- social sciences: economics, law, politics, political science, sociology, etc.
- international organisations: European Union, World Trade Organization (WTO), World Health Organization (WHO), United Nations (UN), International Monetary Fund (IMF), etc.
- international courts: Court of Justice of the European Communities, International Court of Justice (ICJ), etc.
- information sciences: information science, library science, librarianship, book history, etc.
- cartography and geography.

Rare book collection specialists offer consultations on old books. There are also archival services on the basis of the institution and personal collections located in the library, conservation services and binding services available.

=== E-library ===
E-library has been developed since the mid-1990s and is available on the homepage of the National Library of Estonia. It enables readers to:

- use the e-catalogue ESTER;
- request information on licensed databases and e-journals;
- submit inquires in the field of humanities and social sciences;
- read online publications, visit e-exhibitions and purchase the publications of the library;
- get acquainted with digital collections;
- use the information resources of The European Library.

Some services are available only to the registered readers of the National Library. They can:

- reserve books, journals, written music and other items;
- renew the due date of books;
- order copies;
- order items via inter-library loan.

== Collections ==
On January 1, 2007, the collection of the National Library of Estonia included 3,4 million items including:

- 1,975,981 volumes of books;
- 302,988 annual sets of periodicals;
- 20,954 items of cartographic materials;
- 117,777 items of sheet music;
- 180,062 items of graphic art;
- 7,203 items of manuscripts and archive documents;
- 2,635 items of standards;
- 481,088 items of booklets;
- 43,477 items of audio-visual materials;
- 1,852 items of electronic materials;
- 27,198 items of microforms;

Since 1919 the National Library is entitled to receive legal deposit copies of all publications printed in Estonia.

=== Rarities ===
Publications in the Estonian language printed before 1861 and publications in foreign languages printed before 1831, including eight incunabula and 1,500 publications from the 16th and 17th centuries, are stored in the Rare Book Collection. Later publications include a selection of copies with autographs, manuscript amendments and ownership marks, censor's copies, artistic bindings, bibliophile and luxury publications. In addition to 28,000 rare publications, the collection includes 150 manuscripts. Research on old books has been conducted in the library for over 50 years.

The oldest book in the rare book collection is a work of Lambertus de Monte, a theologian from Cologne, - Copulatasuper tres libros Aristotelis De Anima... (Cologne, 1486). The oldest Estonian publication is Heinrich Stahl's book of sermons Leyen Spiegel (Reval, 1641–1649) with parallel texts in Estonian and in German.

== History ==
On December 21, 1918, the Provisional Government of the Estonian Republic decided to establish the State Library. The primary collection of the library was about 2,000 titles necessary for lawmaking and government, and the first users were the members of Parliament (Riigikogu). The library was situated in two small rooms of the Parliament building in the Toompea Castle.

During the time of the independent Republic of Estonia from 1918 to 1940, the library developed and grew fast. In 1919, the library began to receive a legal deposit copy of all printed matter published in Estonia. In 1921, the first international exchange agreements were concluded. In 1935 the State Library established an Archival Collection of all publications in the Estonian language and about Estonia. This was the beginning of a systematic acquisition of printed matter on Estonia and the Baltic countries. In the 1930s, the State Library started to perform more functions than those of a parliamentary library – the collections comprised about 50,000 items and the readership included outstanding intellectuals, cultural and public figures.

With the Soviet occupation, the library became a regular public library, known under the name of the State Library of the Estonian SSR. The role of the library changed considerably: all links with foreign countries and their libraries were severed, and Russian publications predominated, mostly consisting of all-Union deposit copies. The bulk of Estonian and foreign publications was placed in restricted access collections. Between 1948 and 1992 the library was housed in the former Estonian Knighthood House in Tallinn's historic centre.

1953, the library was named after Friedrich Reinhold Kreutzwald, a leading man of letters of the Estonian National Awakening and the author of the Estonian national epic, Kalevipoeg. The collections then amounted to one million items already.

The liberation movement that began in the Baltic countries in the 1980s and the restoration of the independent Republic of Estonia on August 20, 1991, considerably changed the role of the library.

In 1988, the Friedrich Reinhold Kreutzwald State Library was renamed the National Library of Estonia with a mission to collect, preserve and provide access to all documents published in the Estonian language and in Estonia, and also about or including information on Estonia.

In 1989, the library's legal status as a parliamentary library was restored with an obligation to provide information services for the Riigikogu and the Government. The present National Library of Estonia is a legal entity in public law, which operates pursuant to the National Library of Estonia Act, adopted in 1998, and amended in 2002 and 2006, and its Statutes. Its collegial decision-making body is the National Library Board with members appointed by the Riigikogu.

=== Library building ===
The National Library building at Tõnismägi in Tallinn, specially designed for the library, was constructed between 1985 and 1993. The architect of the building is Raine Karp and its interior designer is Sulev Vahtra. The eight-storey building with two floors below ground level is until now the largest library in the Baltic countries. It houses 20 reading rooms with 600 reader's seats, a large conference hall, a theatre hall and numerous exhibition areas. The library's stacks are designed to hold five million volumes. All stacks are equipped with shelves and air-conditioning, appropriate for preserving the documents.
