= Sõprus =

Cinema in Tallinn, Estonia

Coordinates: 59°26′07″N 24°44′44″E

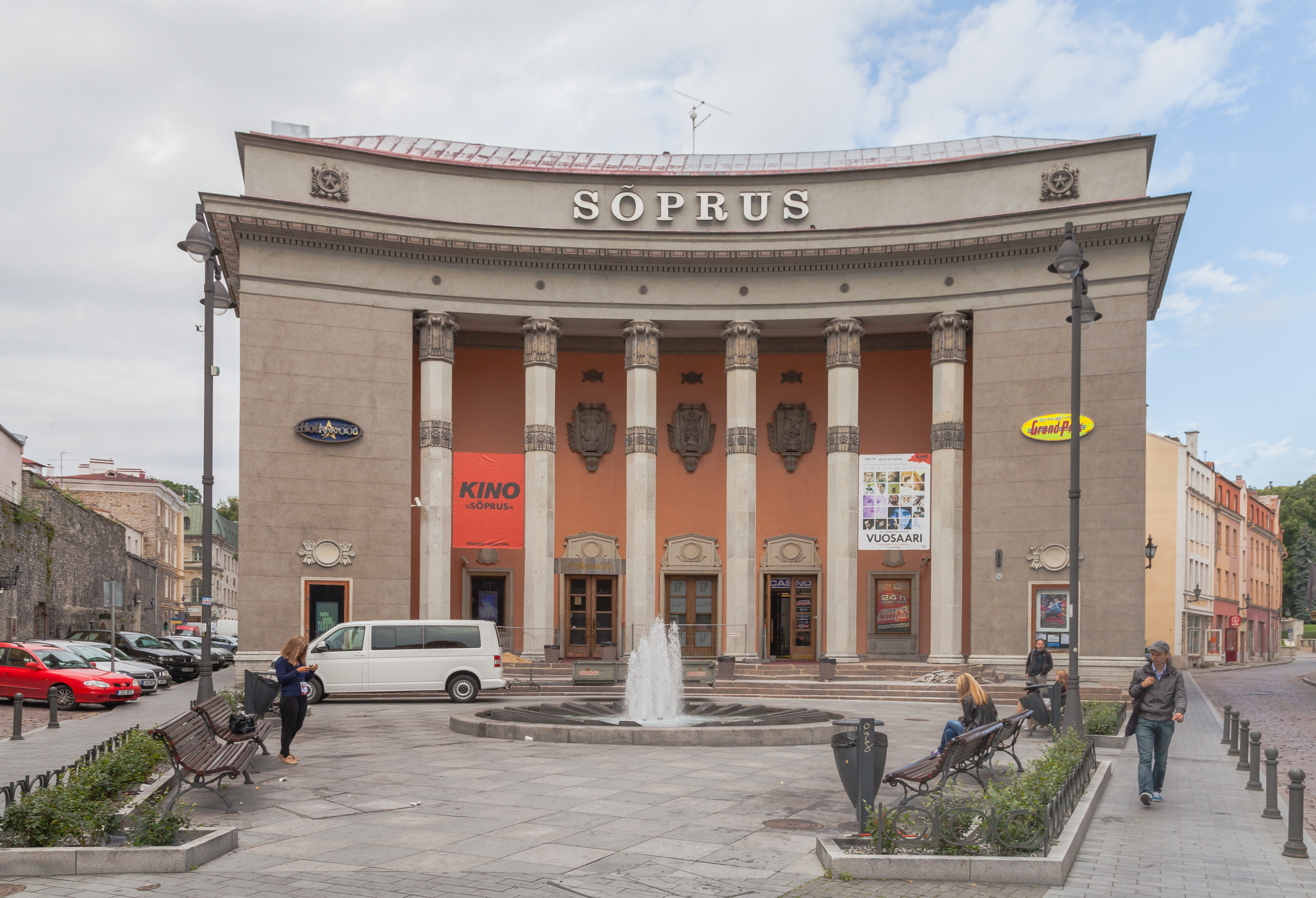
Sõprus (August 2012)

Sõprus ('Friendship') is a cinema in Tallinn, Estonia.

The venue was built in 1955 and it was designed from 1952- 1952 by Peeter Tarvas, August Volberg, Ilmar Laas; first draft by Friedrich Wendach; interior was designed by Maia Laul. It the beginning, the building's had two halls: so-called red hall and white hall, each having 396 seats. Since 1995, only one hall is used by the cinema. By 2004, the hall had 282 seats.

It is apart of Europa Cinemas, a network of movie theatres with the goal of distributing films from different countries across Europe, but also providing financial support for the venues.

== History ==
The cinema was built on the site of buildings destroyed in the 1944 March bombings of Tallinn.

Originally, it was going to be named Spartacus or Leningrad, but due to the improved relations between China and the Soviet Union, it was named Sõprus (friendship).
