= Kristjan Port =

Estonian sport biologist

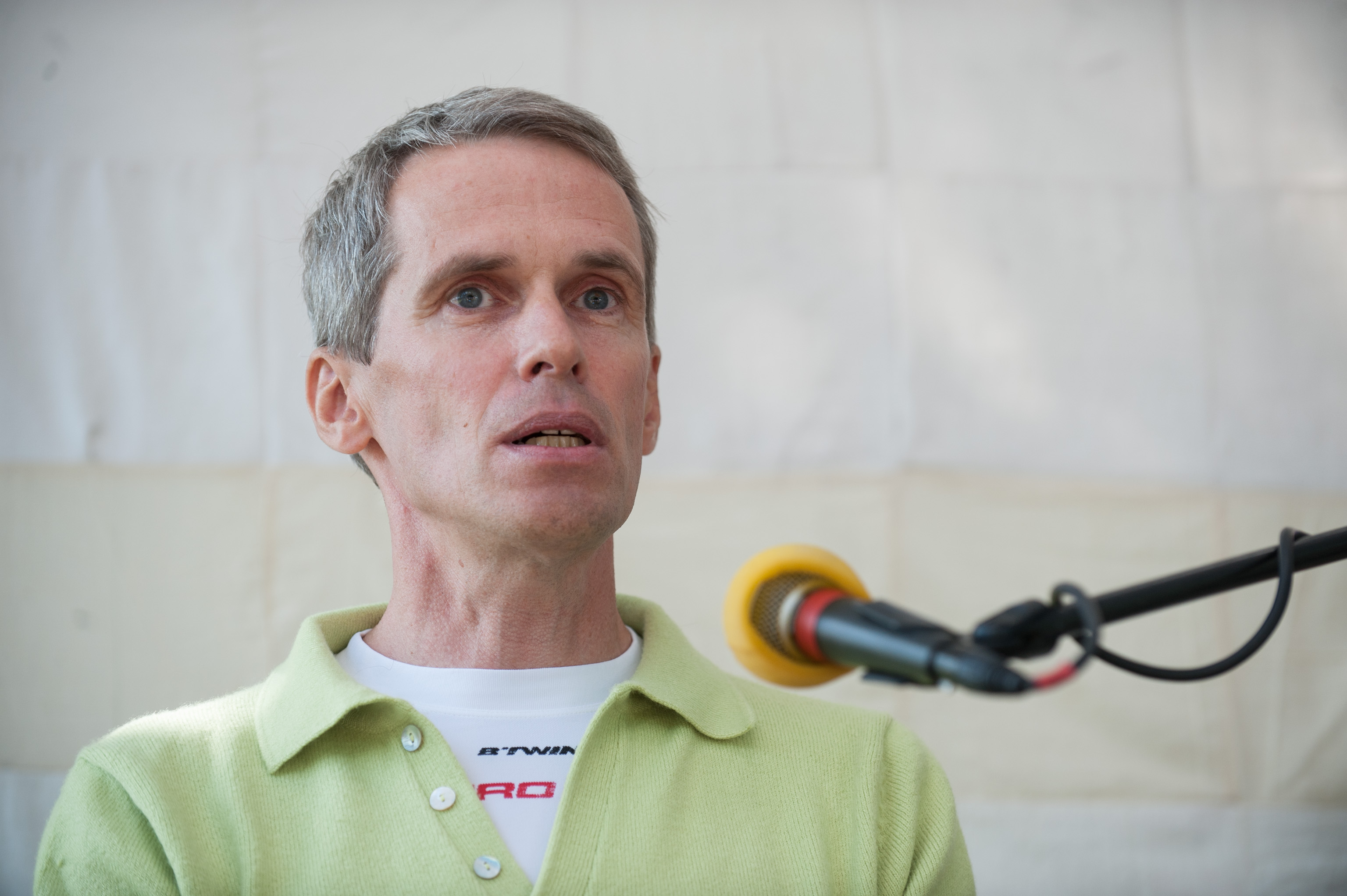
Kristjan Port

Kristjan Port (born 9 May 1960 in Tallinn) is an Estonian sport biologist. 2008–2015, he was the head of Tallinn University's Institute of Health Sciences and Sport Institute. Since 2008, he is a member of Estonian Anti-Doping Foundation.

In 2020, he was awarded with Order of the White Star, III class.
