= Tartu Elektriteater =

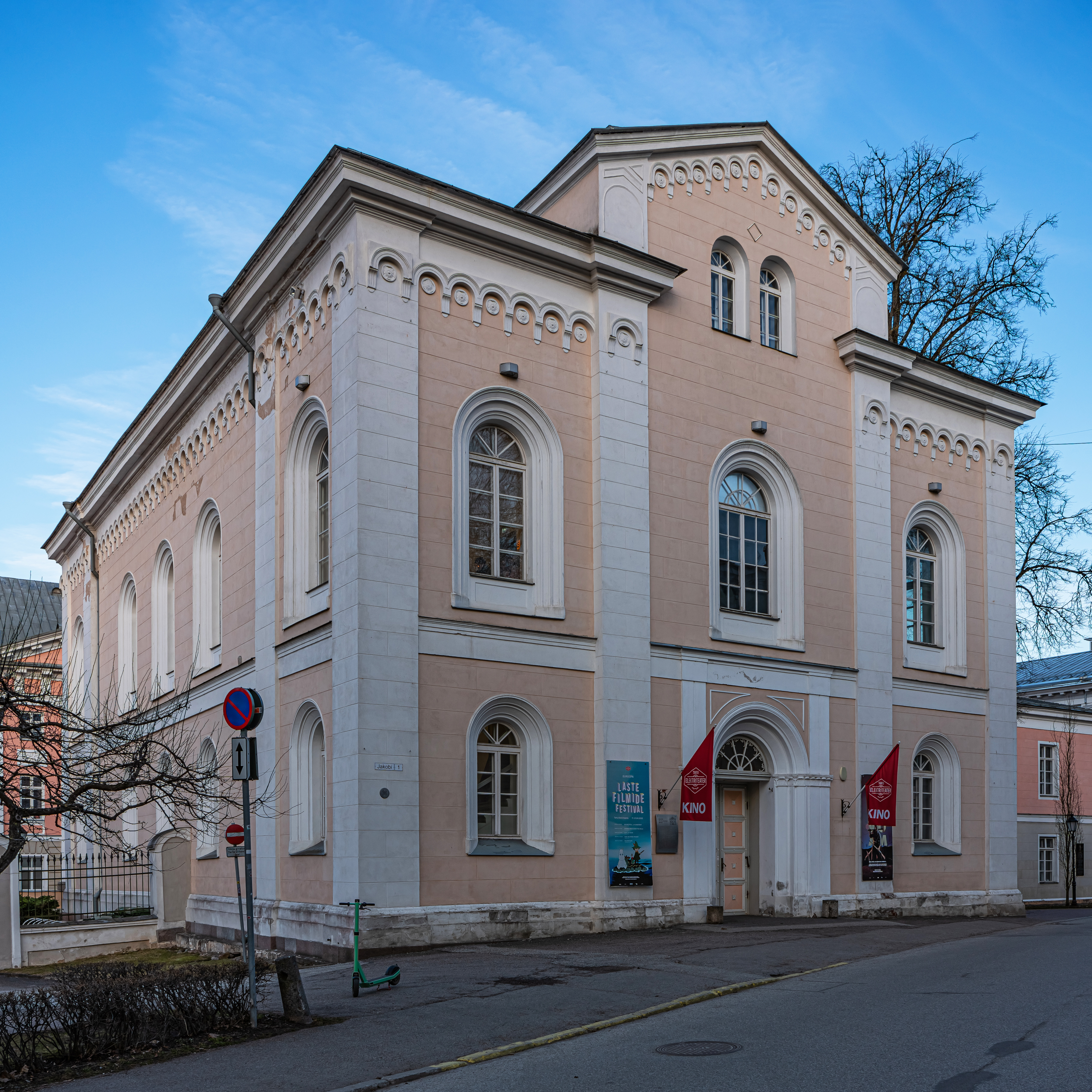
- Jakobi 1
- Address: Jakobi 1 (Kiriku hall), Kompanii 2 (Raekoja hall); Tartu, Estonia
- Capacity: 115 (Kiriku), 42 (Raekoja)
- Screens: 2

Construction
- Opened: 2012

Website
- https://elektriteater.ee/

Tartu Elektriteater (lit. 'Electric theatre') is an art-house cinema in Tartu, Estonia.

The cinema started operating under the name Tartu Elektriteater in 2012. In the early years the cinema was located at Lai 37 in the rooms of the theatre Tartu Uus Teater. In October 2017 the cinema moved into the rooms of The University of Tartu Church at Jakobi 1.

In November 2025, the cinema opened a second screening room at the corner of Raekoja plats and Kompanii street. There, the cinema's Raekoja hall (Kompanii 2) also operates a bar.

The film programme of the cinema is mostly made up of Estonian and European feature and documentary films with some animation, short or classic films.

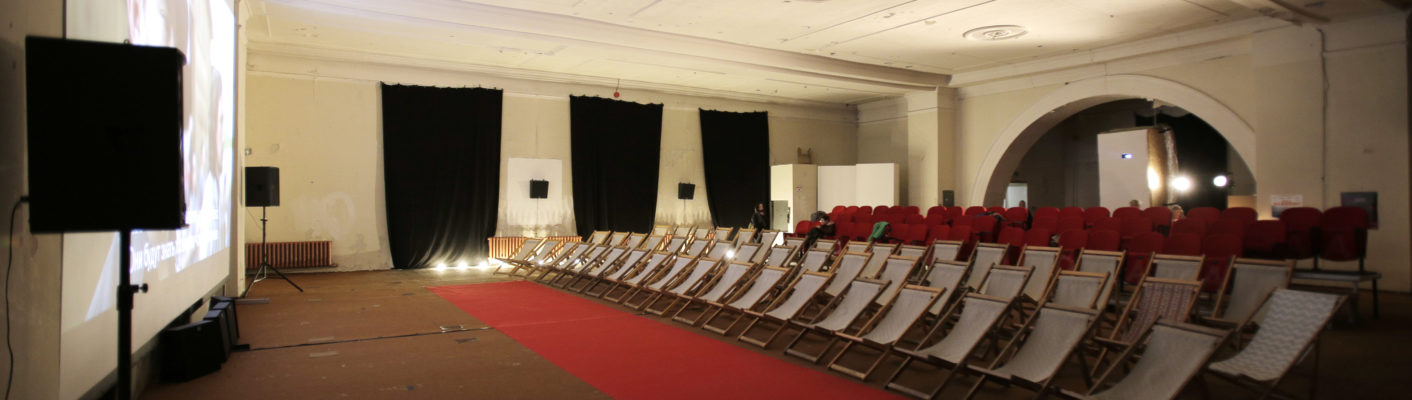
Hall of Tartu Elektriteater in 2017
