= Kuusalu =

Borough in Estonia

- Small borough
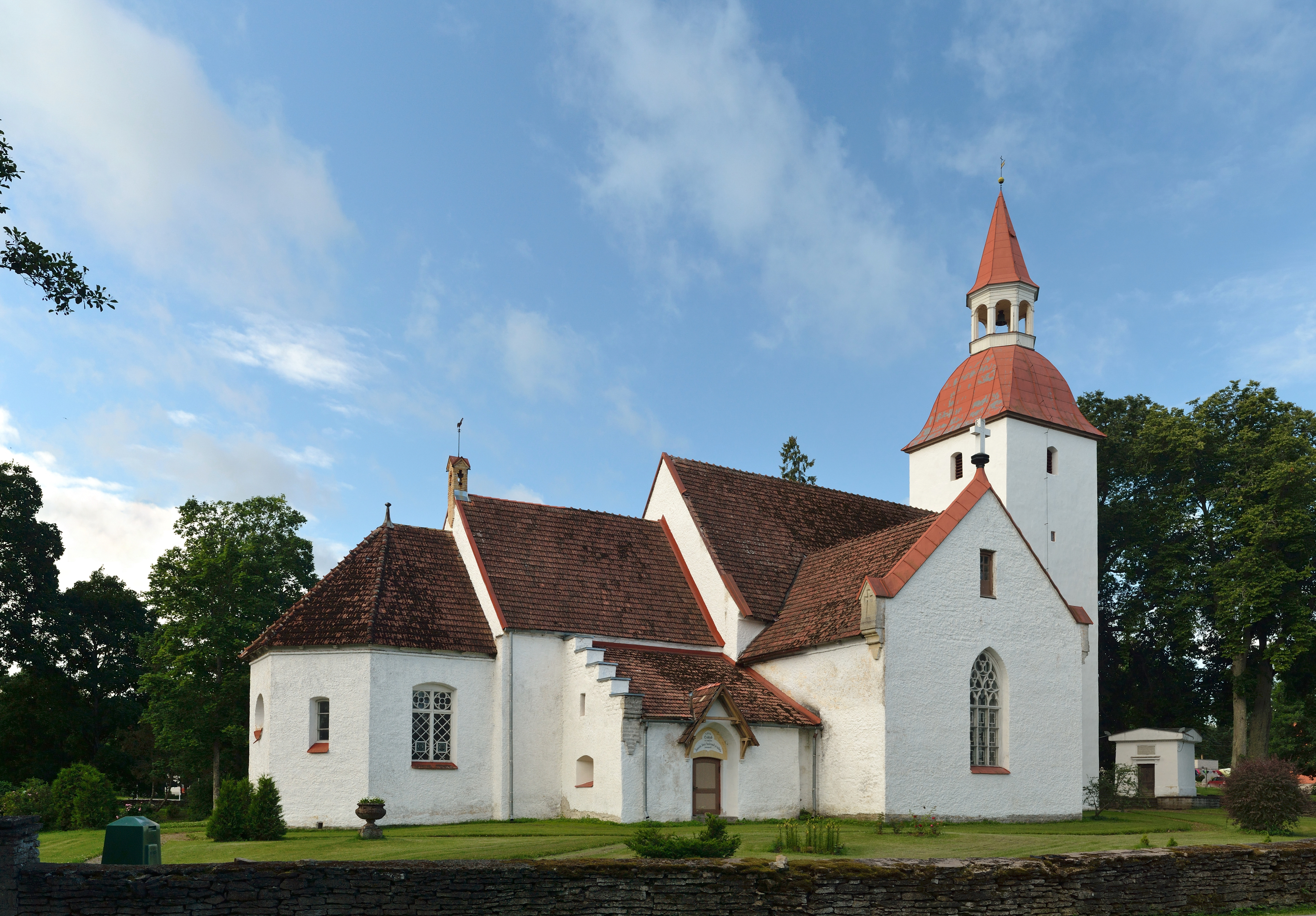
- Kuusalu church

- Location in Estonia
- Coordinates: 59°26′38″N 25°26′29″E
- Country: Estonia
- County: Harju County
- Municipality: Kuusalu Parish

Population (01.01.2010)
  - Total: 1,220

Kuusalu (German: Kusal) is a small borough (Estonian: alevik) in Harju County, northern Estonia. It is the administrative centre of Kuusalu Parish and has a population of 1,220 as of 1 January 2010.

== Monuments ==
- Memorial to the Deportees in shape of a phone.
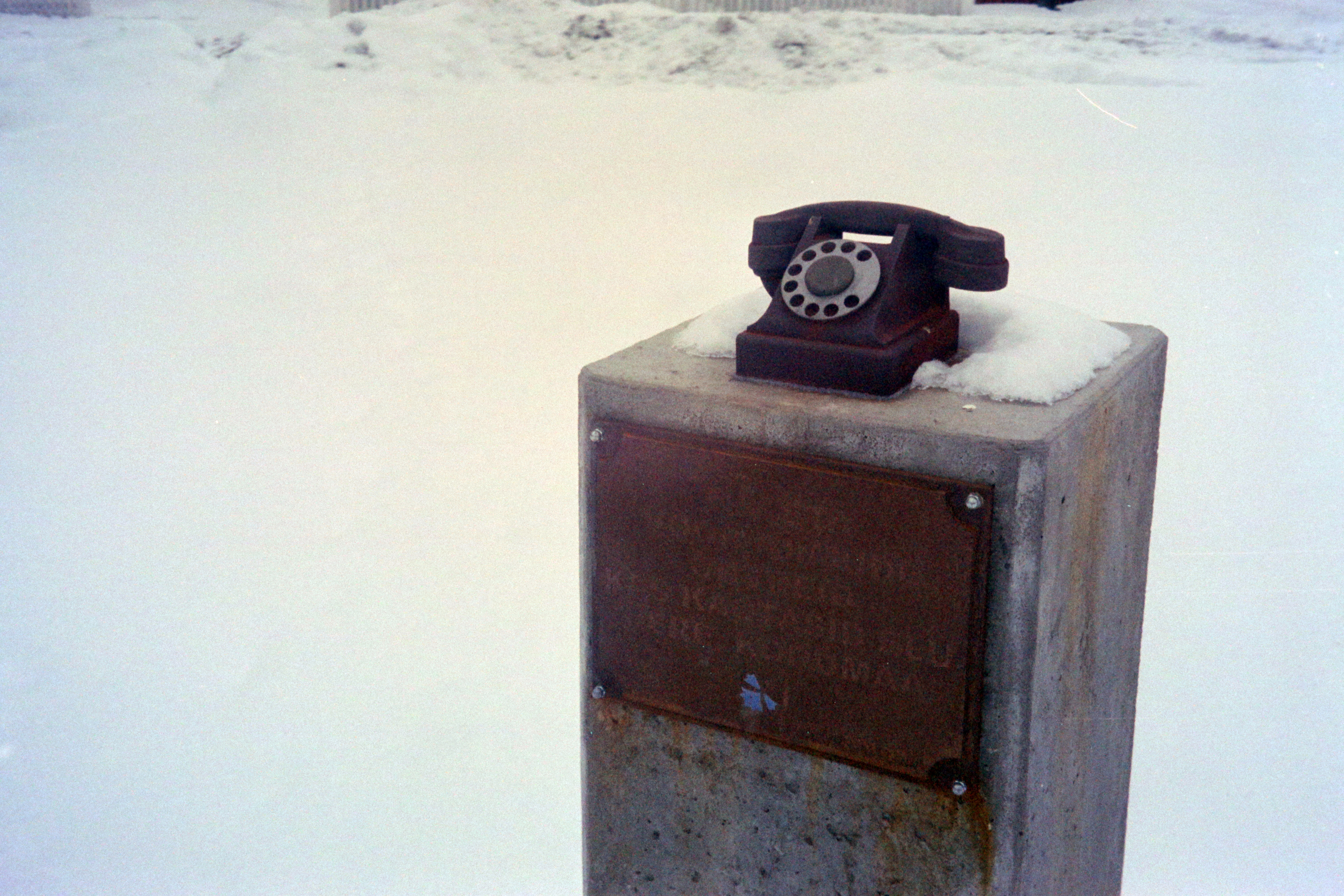
  Deportees memorial: detail.
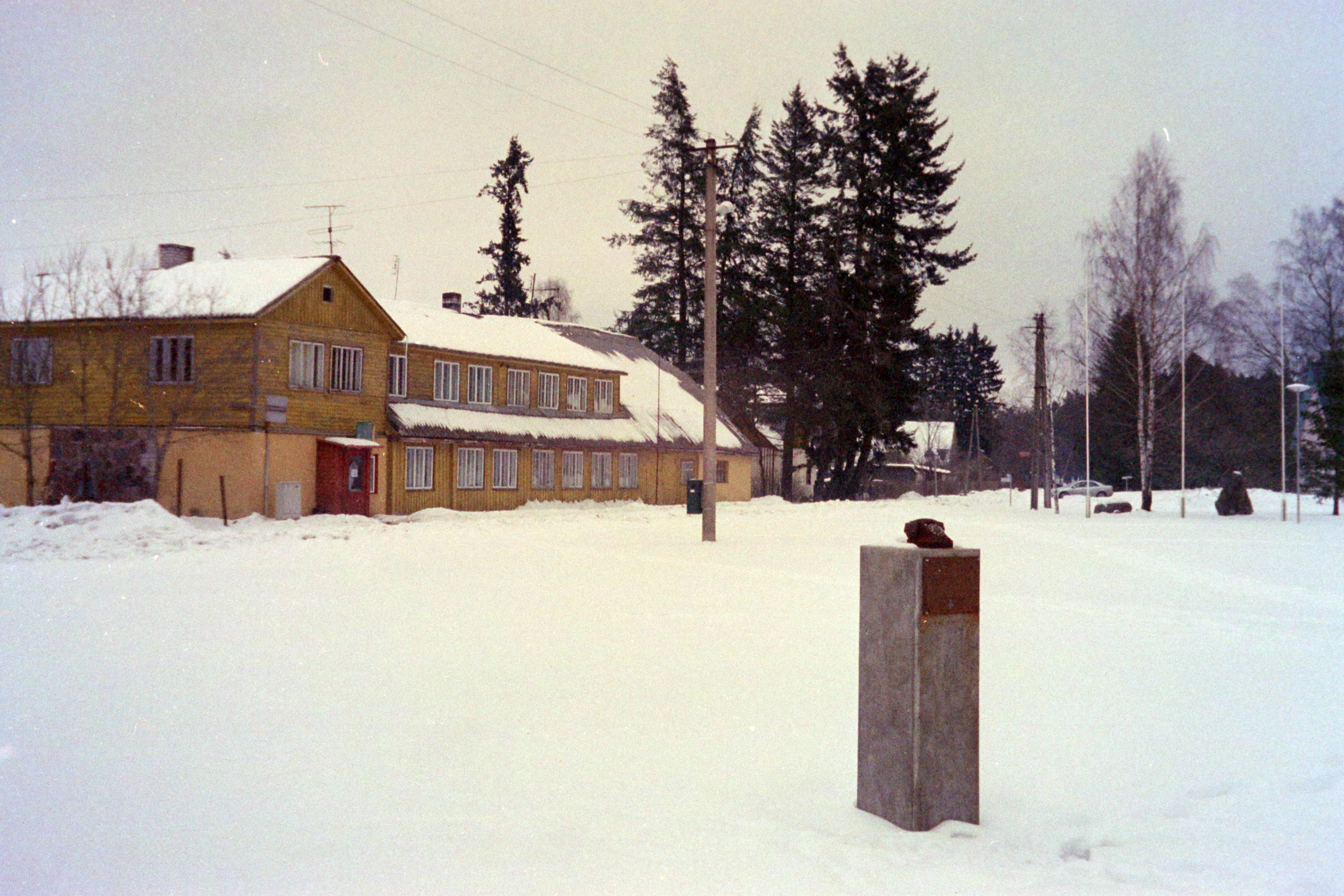
  Deportees memorial: with surroundings.

== Notable people ==
- Eduard Ahrens (1803–1863), clergyman and linguist
- Ludvig Oskar (1874–1951), painter
- Veljo Tormis (1930–2017), composer

== See also ==
- Kuusalu JK Rada
