= Estonian Red Cross =

Humanitarian non-governmental organization in Estonia

- Eesti Punane Rist
- Purpose: Humanitarian Aid
- Headquarters: Tallinn, Estonia
- Region served: Estonia
- Parent organization: International Federation of Red Cross and Red Crescent Societies
- Website: Official website

Estonian Red Cross (Estonian: Eesti Punane Rist, EPR) is the Estonian national Red Cross Society.

The organization is established on 24 February 1919 in the initiative of Hans Leesment.

Since 1992 the organization is a member of International Federation of Red Cross and Red Crescent Societies.
