= Uno Tölpus =

Estonian architect

Uno Tölpus (14 August 1928 Kunda – 11 August 1964 Käsmu) was an Estonian architect. He was one of the most notable Estonian architects in 1950s.

In 1952, he graduated from Tallinn Polytechnical Institute. From 1952 to 1964, he worked at the architectural bureau Eesti Projekt.

== Works ==
- 1958: Eesti Energia's building in Tallinn (with Peeter Tarvas)
- 1963: Tallinn University Academic Library (with P. Madalik)
- Vanemuine Concert Hall (one of the designers)
