= Peressaare =

Village in Estonia

Coordinates: 59°05′N 26°51′E

- Village
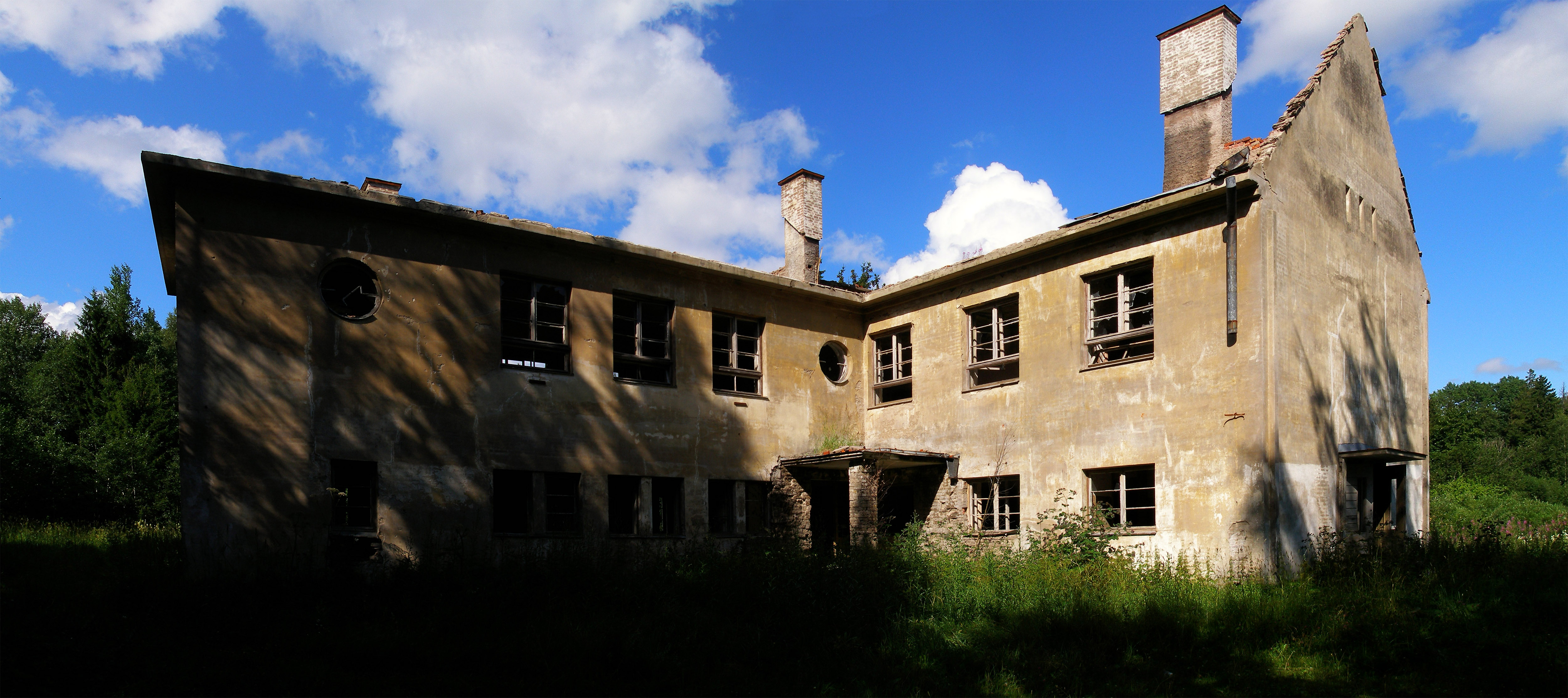
- The former Peressaare school, which closed in 1964 due to a shortage of students
- Interactive map of Peressaare
- Country: Estonia
- County: Ida-Viru County
- Parish: Alutaguse Parish
- Time zone: UTC+2 (EET)
  - Summer (DST): UTC+3 (EEST)

Peressaare is a village in Alutaguse Parish, Ida-Viru County in northeastern Estonia.
