= Muuksi =

Village in Estonia

- Village
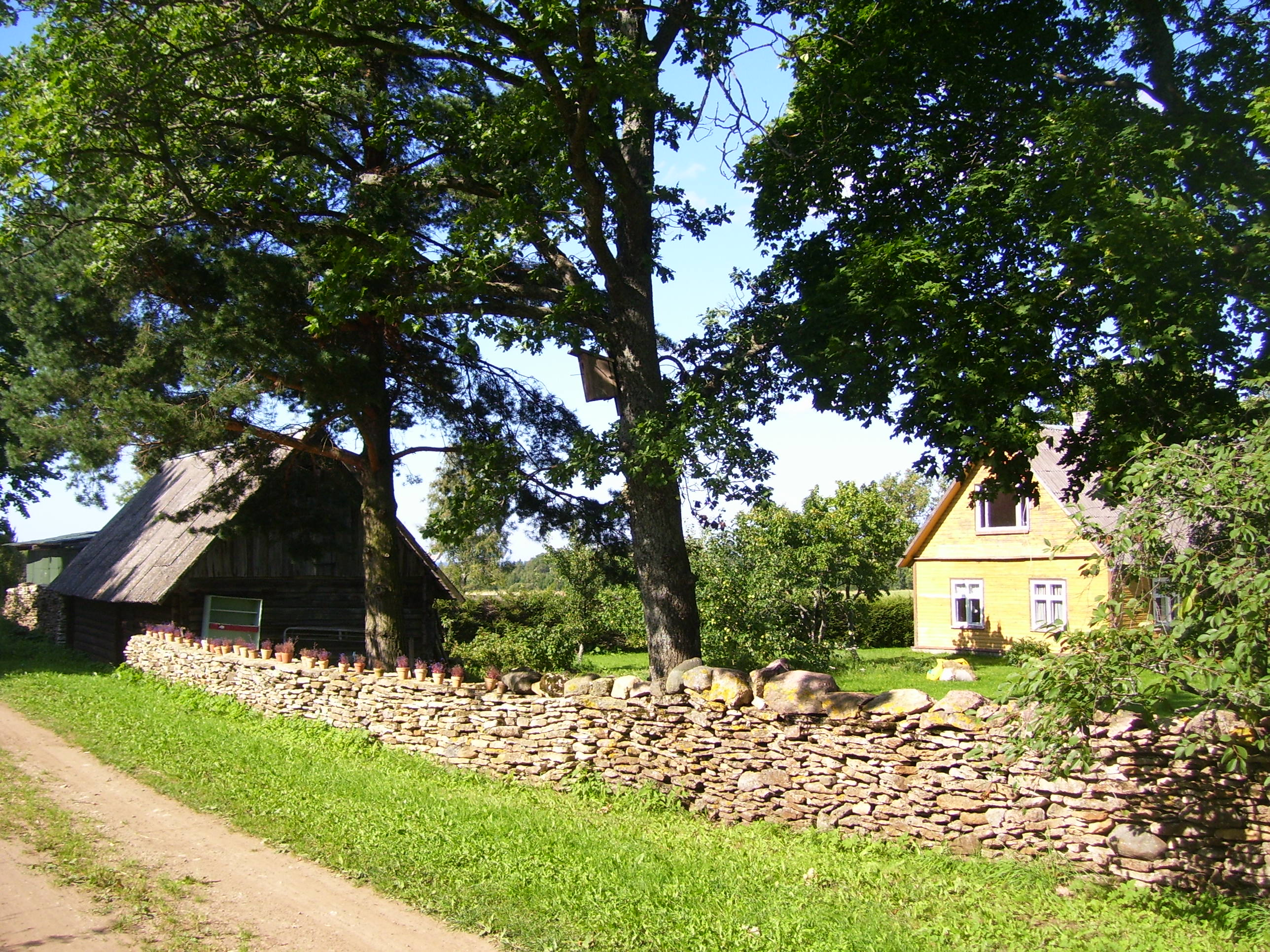

- Location within Estonia
- Coordinates: 59°30′N 25°32′E
- Country: Estonia
- County: Harju County
- Parish: Kuusalu Parish
- Time zone: UTC+2 (EET)
  - Summer (DST): UTC+3 (EEST)

Muuksi is a village in Kuusalu Parish, Harju County in northern Estonia.

Architect Erika Nõva (1905–1987) was born in Toomani farmstead in Muuksi village.

== Gallery ==
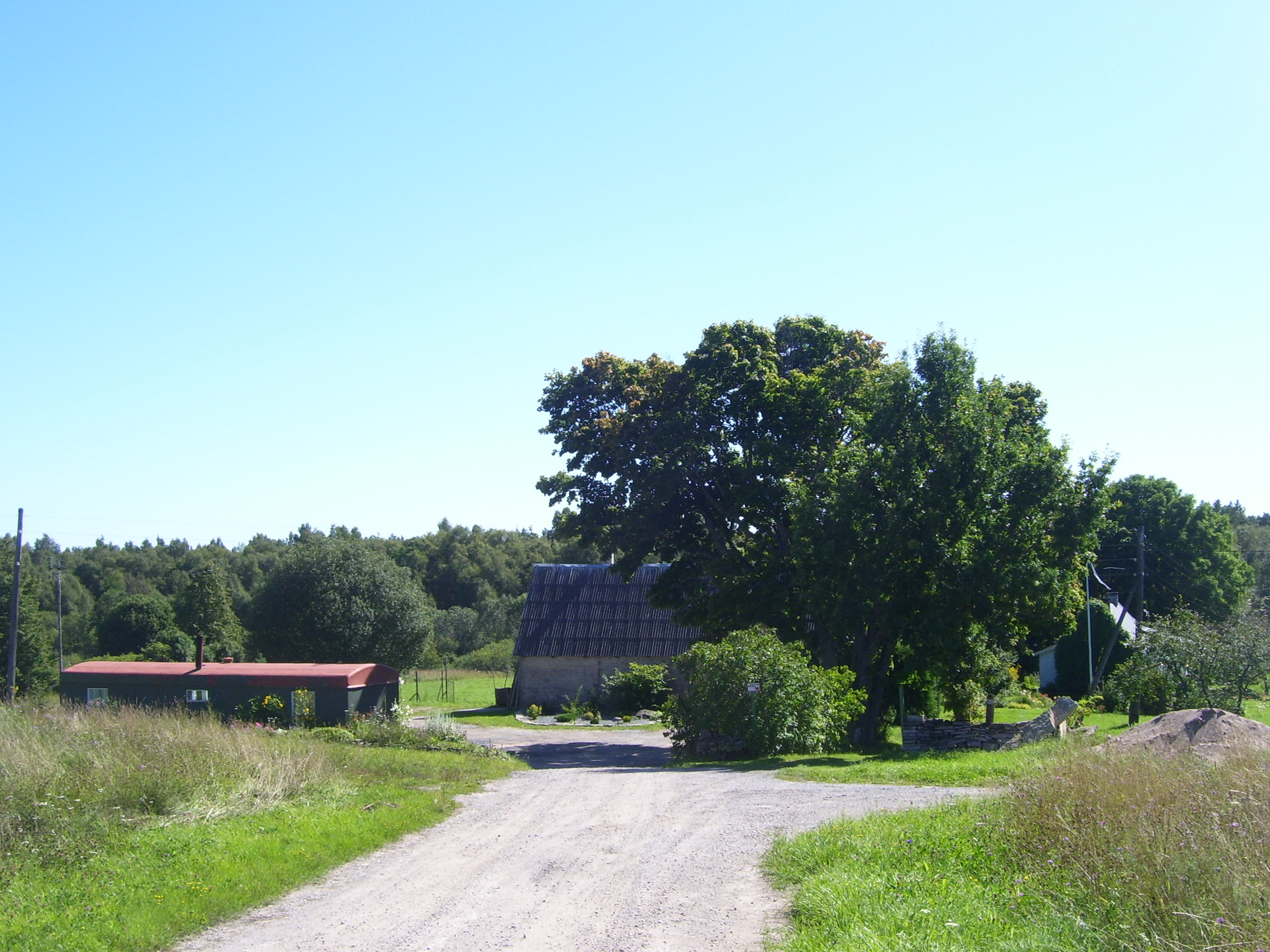
Sepa farmstead in Muuksi

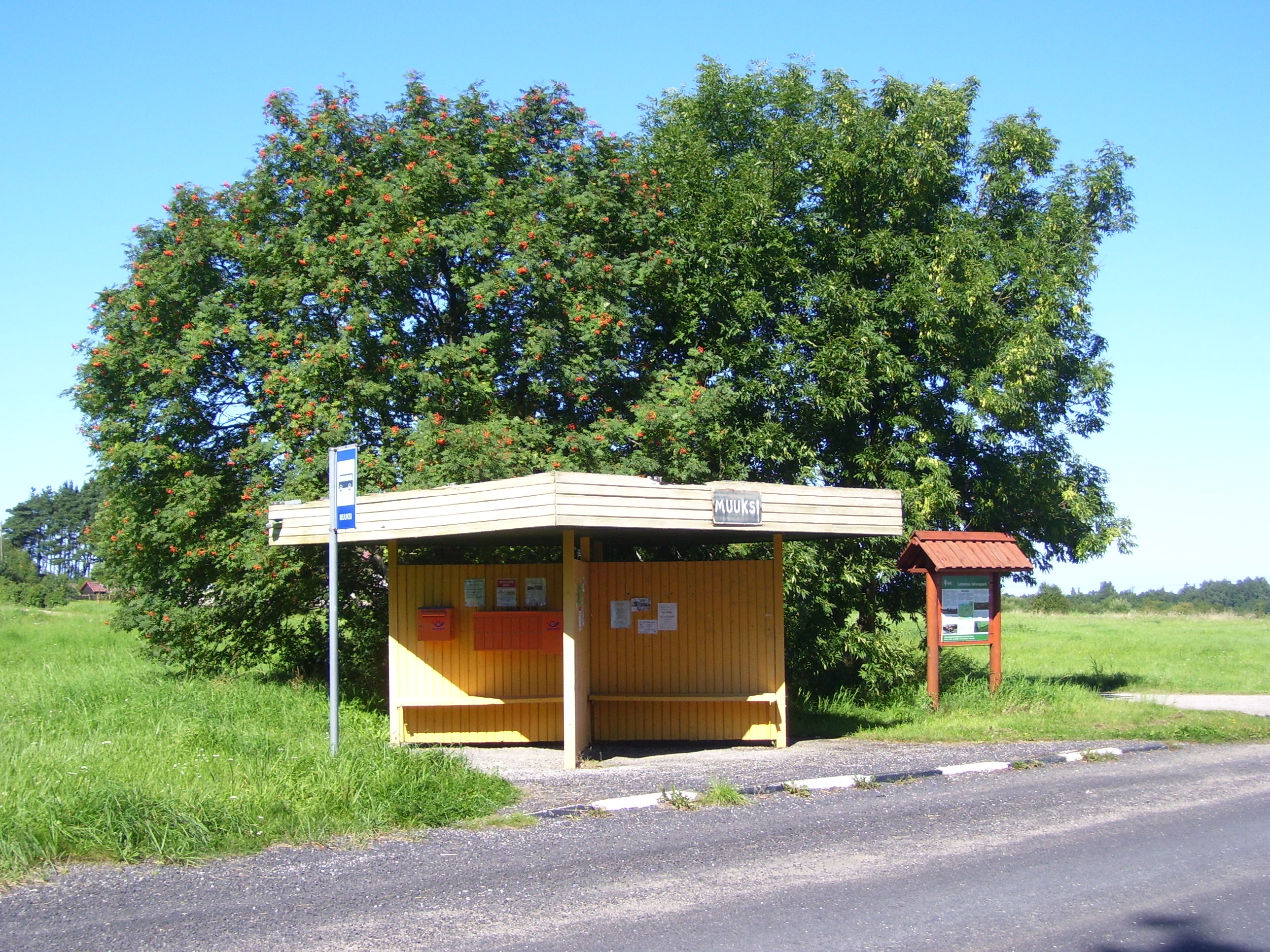
Muuksi bus stop

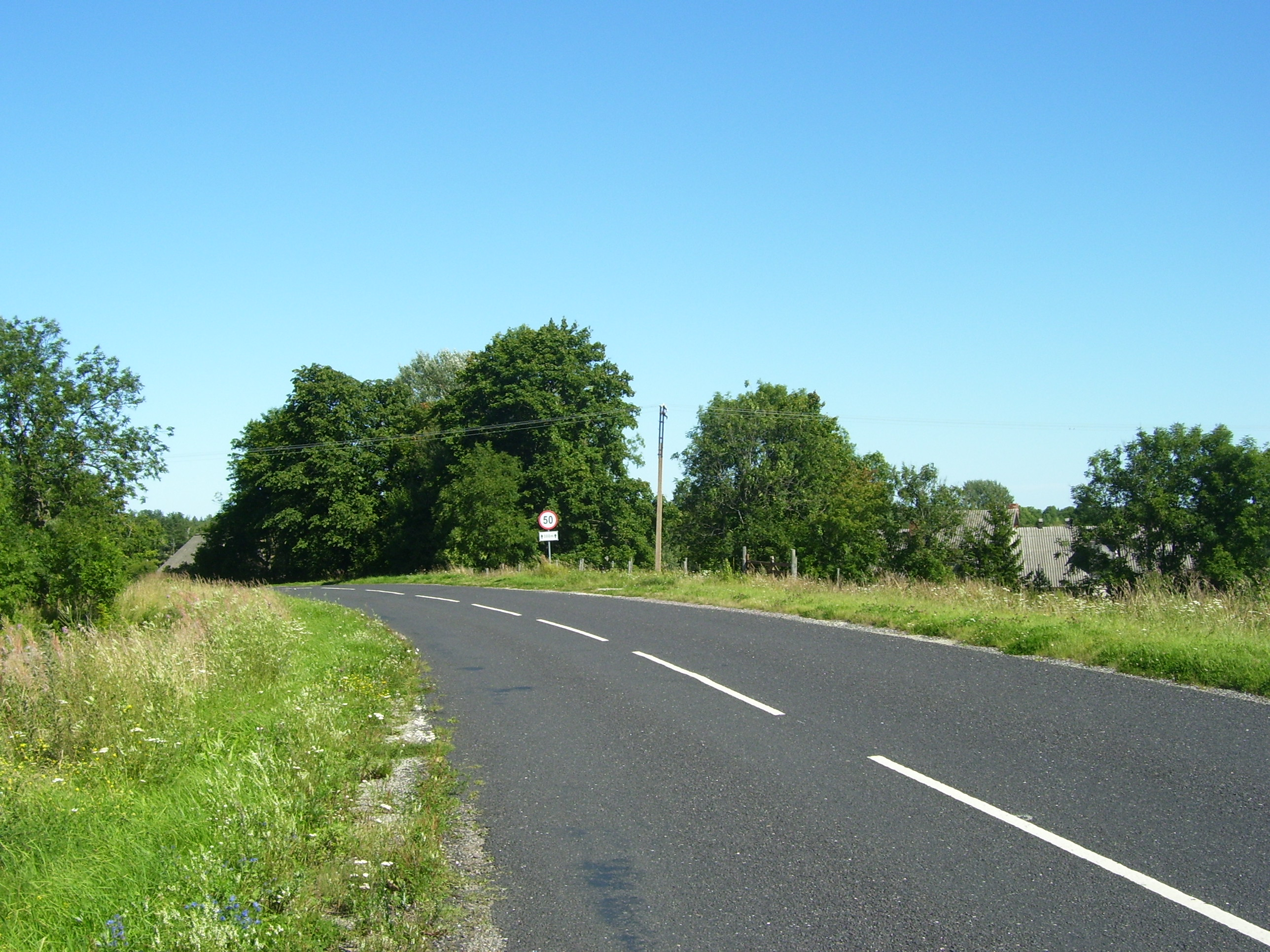
