= Eesti Projekt =

Eesti Projekt ('Estonian Project') was an Estonian architectural institute which existed between 1944 and 2006. In 2006, three companies (AS Eesti Projekt, AS ETP Grupp and AS Sweco Eesti) were merged, and AS Sweco Projekt was established.

Names

- 1944–1948 Ehituse Projekteerimise Instituut
- 1948–1949 Riiklik Ehituse Projekteerimise Instituut
- 1949–1951 Vabariiklik Projekteerimise Trust "Estonprojekt
- 1951–1955 Vabariiklik Projekteerimise Instituut "Estonprojekt"
- 1955–1957 kandis nime Riiklik Projekteerimise Instituut "Estongiprogorstroi"
- 1957–1961 kandis nime Riiklik Projekteerimise Instituut "Estonprojekt"
- 1961–1991 kandis nime Riiklik Projekteerimise Instituut "Eesti Projekt"

In 1991, the institution was re-organized into state joint-stock company.

1961–1989, the head architect of the institution was Mart Port.
