= Freedom Square, Tallinn =

Square in Tallinn, Estonia

Coordinates: 59°26′1.52″N 24°44′38.89″E

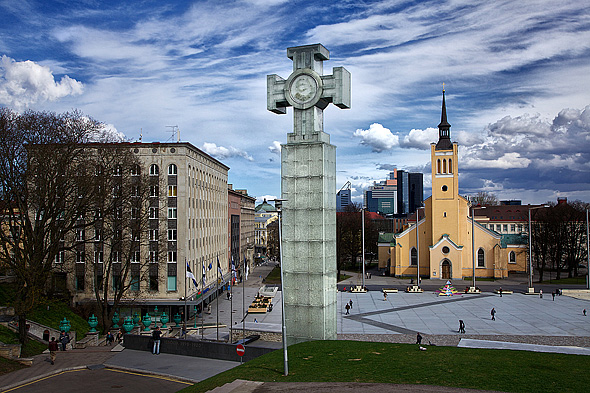
Freedom square. View from Harjumägi. In the foreground the War of Independence Victory Column, with the building of the former insurance company EEKS-MAJA on the left, and St. John's Church behind

Freedom Square (Estonian: Vabaduse väljak) is a plaza on the southern end of the Old Town in Tallinn, Estonia, where state functions and various concerts take place. It is bounded on the east by St. John's Church (built 1862–67), on the south by Kaarli Boulevard and an underground shopping center (2008–09), and on the west by a Victory Column (2009) commemorating the Estonian War of Independence 1918–1920.

== Design ==
The current design was created by the architects Tiit Trummal, Veljo Kaasik, and Andres Alver. Before 2010, it was a parking lot. It has an area of 7,752 square meters (83,440 sq ft) and measures approximately 110 by 75 meters (361 ft × 246 ft).

=== Nearby places ===
- War of Independence Victory Column
- St. John's Church, Tallinn
- Palace Hotel
- Georg Ots Tallinn Music College
- Russian Theatre
- Tallinn City Government Building
- Tallinn Art Hall
- Estonian Artists' Association
- Estonian Centre for Contemporary Art

== History ==
=== Pre-republic ===
The square arose on the site of the Swedish bastion in front of the Harju Gate, which was demolished in the middle of the 19th century. In 1867, the St. John's Church was erected on the square. In 1910, the Haymarket was liquidated on the square, and the square was paved with stones. On the 200th anniversary of the capture of the city by the Russian Empire, a monument to Peter I was erected on the square, which was dismantled on 1 May 1922.

=== First Republic ===
In 1935, the area of the square was expanded. The boulevards were relocated and almost 2,500 square meters of new space was built under the square.

=== Soviet era ===
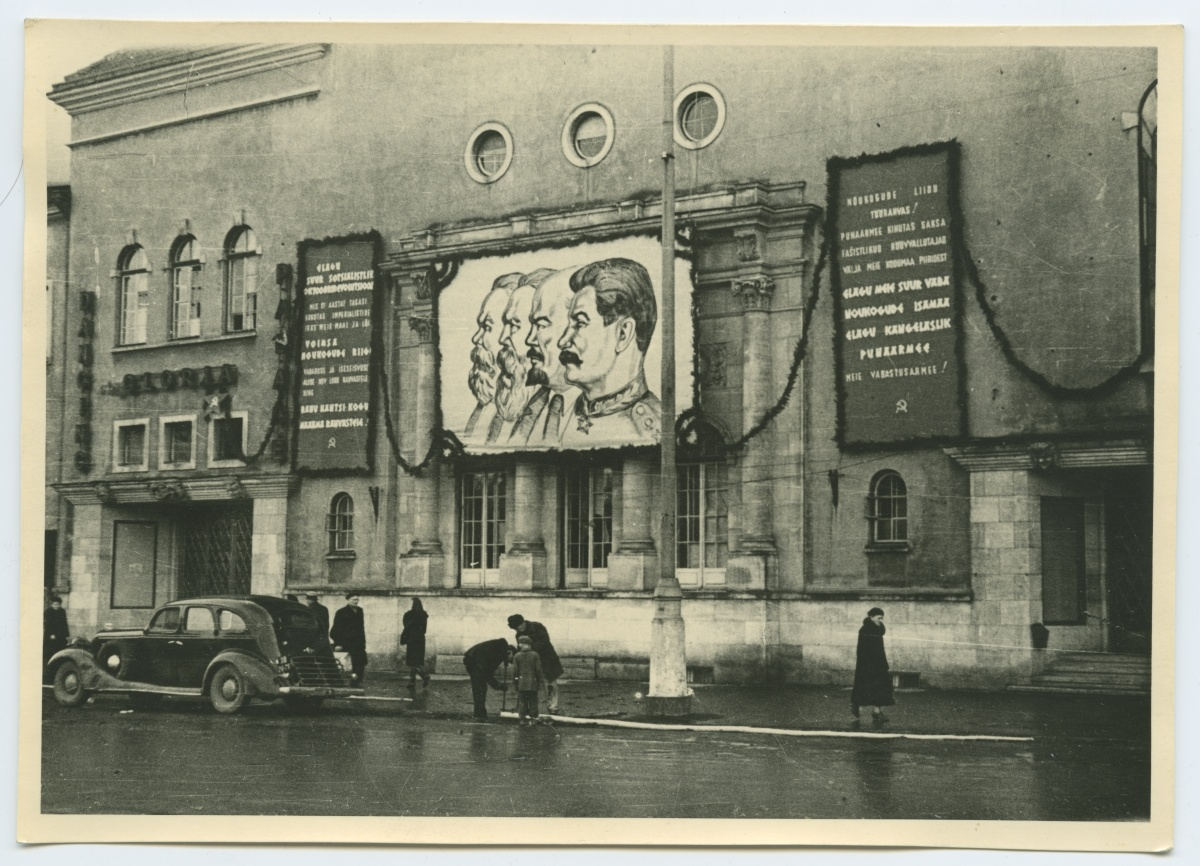
A Stalinist building facade on the square.

On 29 April 1941, Freedom Square was named to Victory Square after the beginning Soviet occupation of Estonia. In the autumn of 1941, after the arrival of the German Wehrmacht, the name of Freedom Square was restored. On 22 September 1944, the Red Army entered Tallinn and by 1948, it was reverted to Victory Square. During the Soviet period, Freedom Square was known as the Victory Square (Võidu väljak). In the USSR, the square hosted parades in honor of holidays like Victory Day, the October Revolution, and before 1969, International Workers' Day.

=== Modern Freedom Square ===
The Cross of Liberty and the Monument to the War of Independence was opened on 23 June 2009 as a memorial for those who fell during the Estonian War of Independence.

== Gallery ==
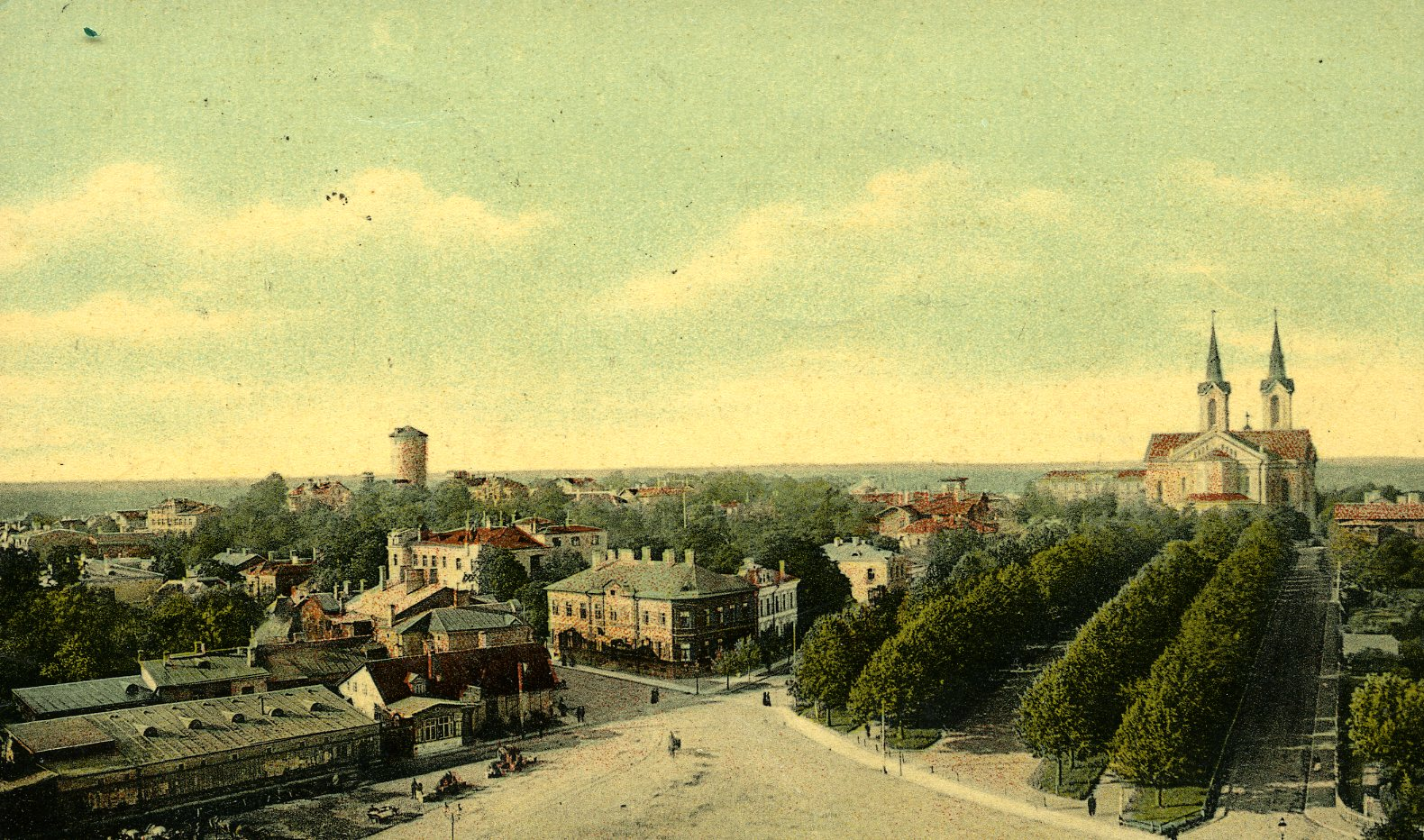
Postcard image of Freedom Square from 1900

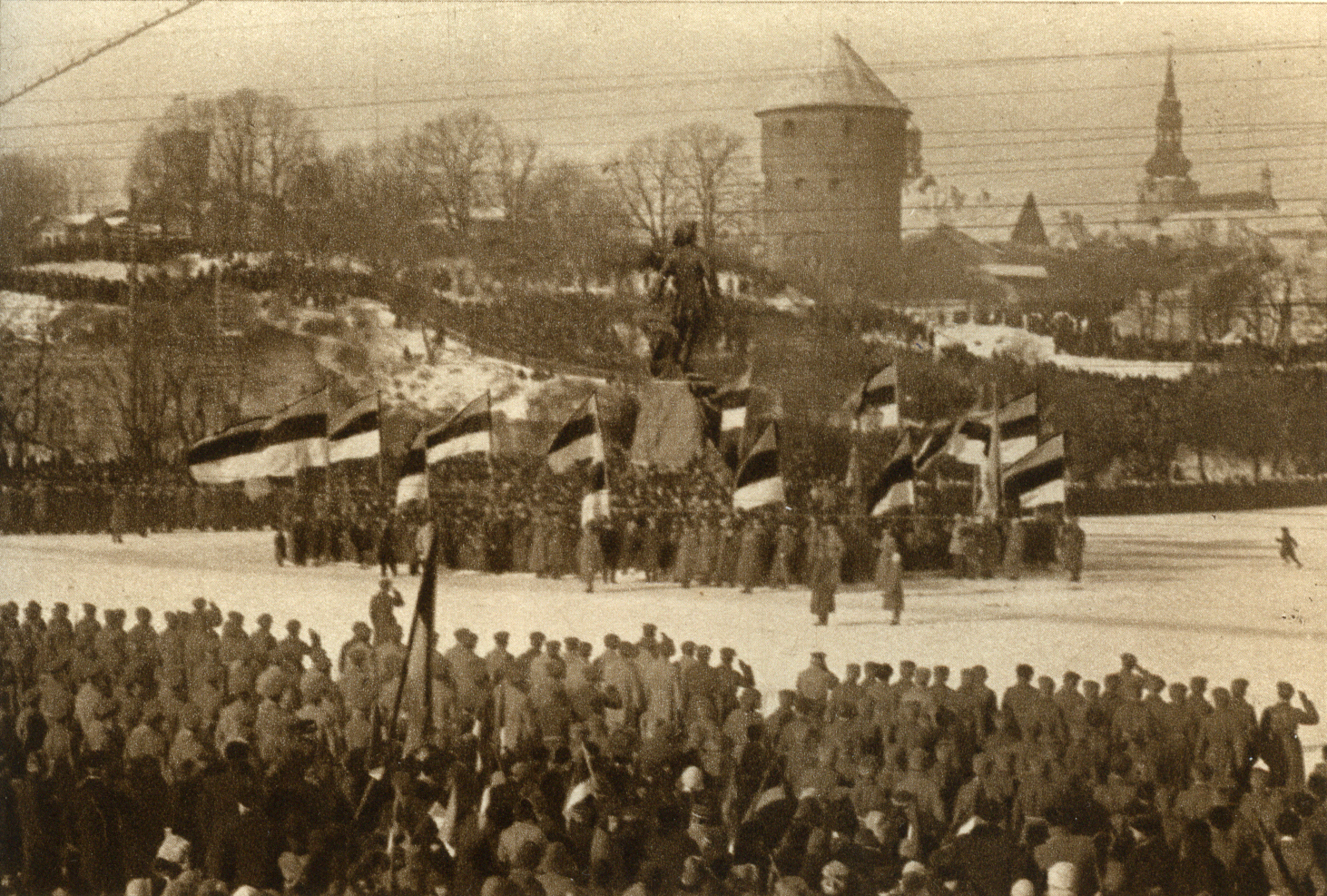
The first celebration of Estonian Independence Day in 1919

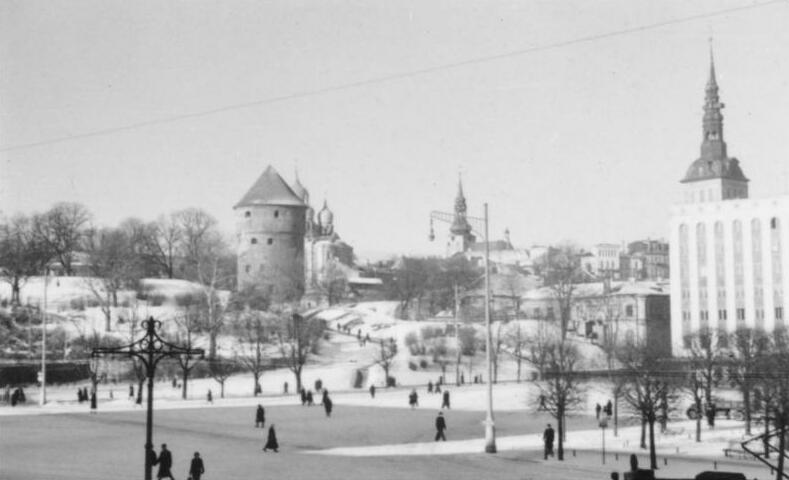
During the German occupation in 1943

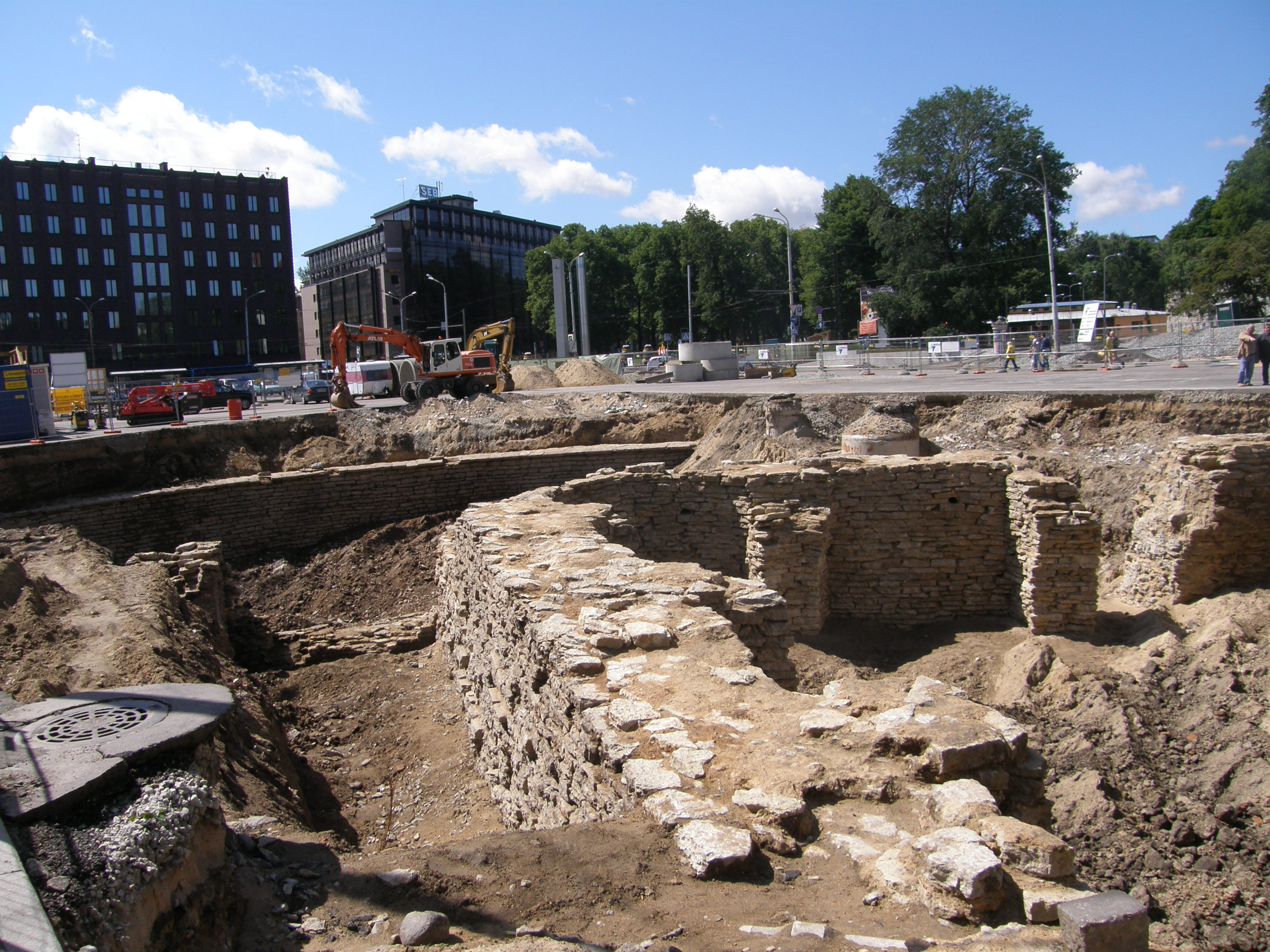
Archaeological excavation, June 2008

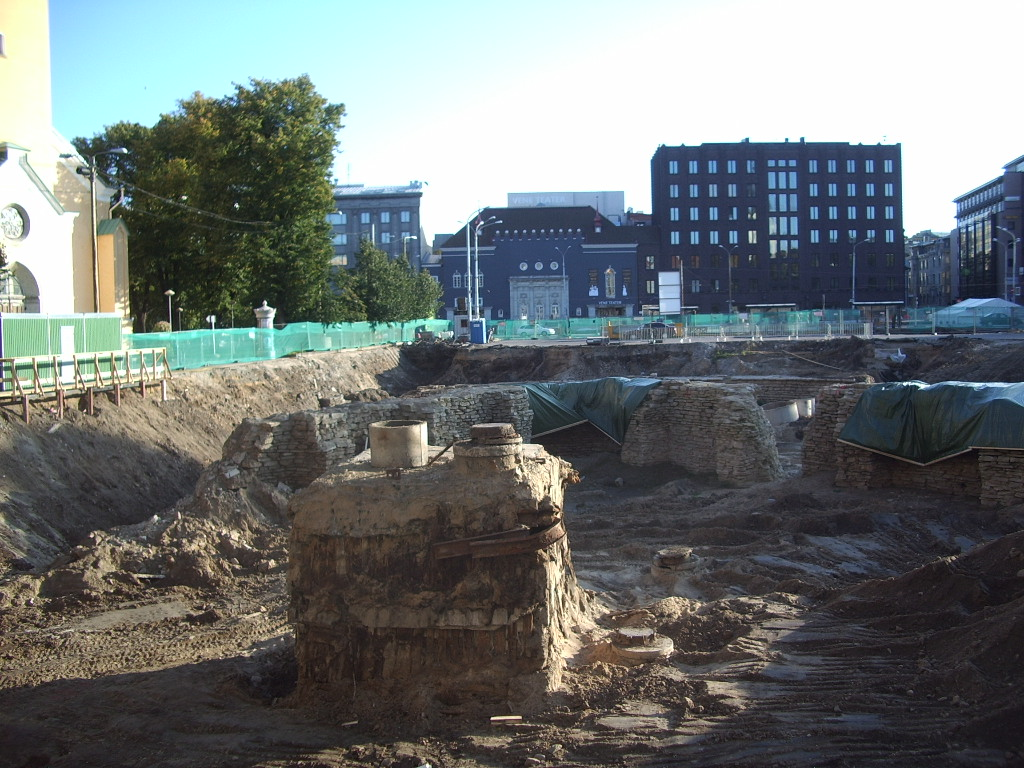
The reconstruction process in 2008

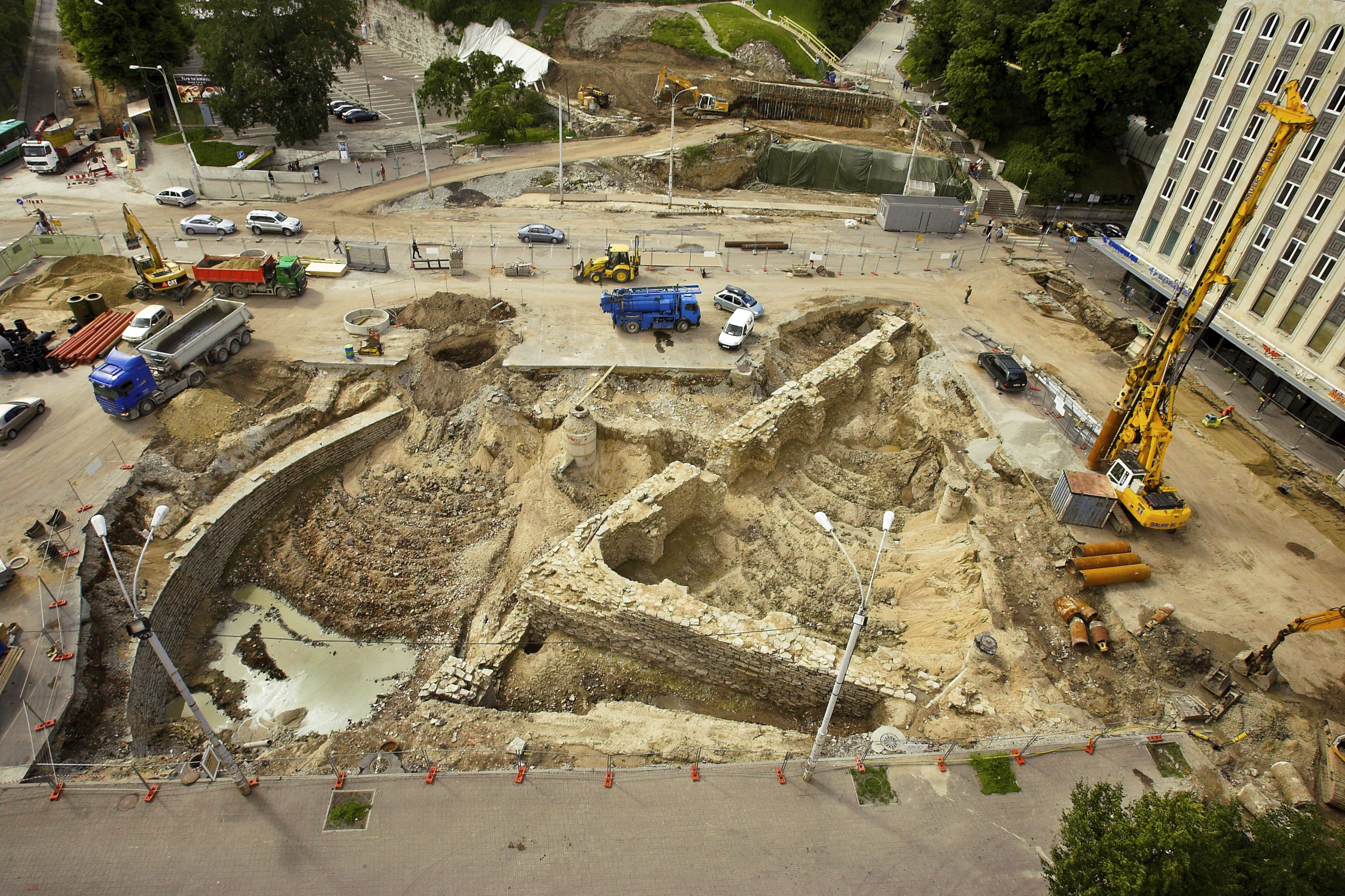
Moat in July 2008

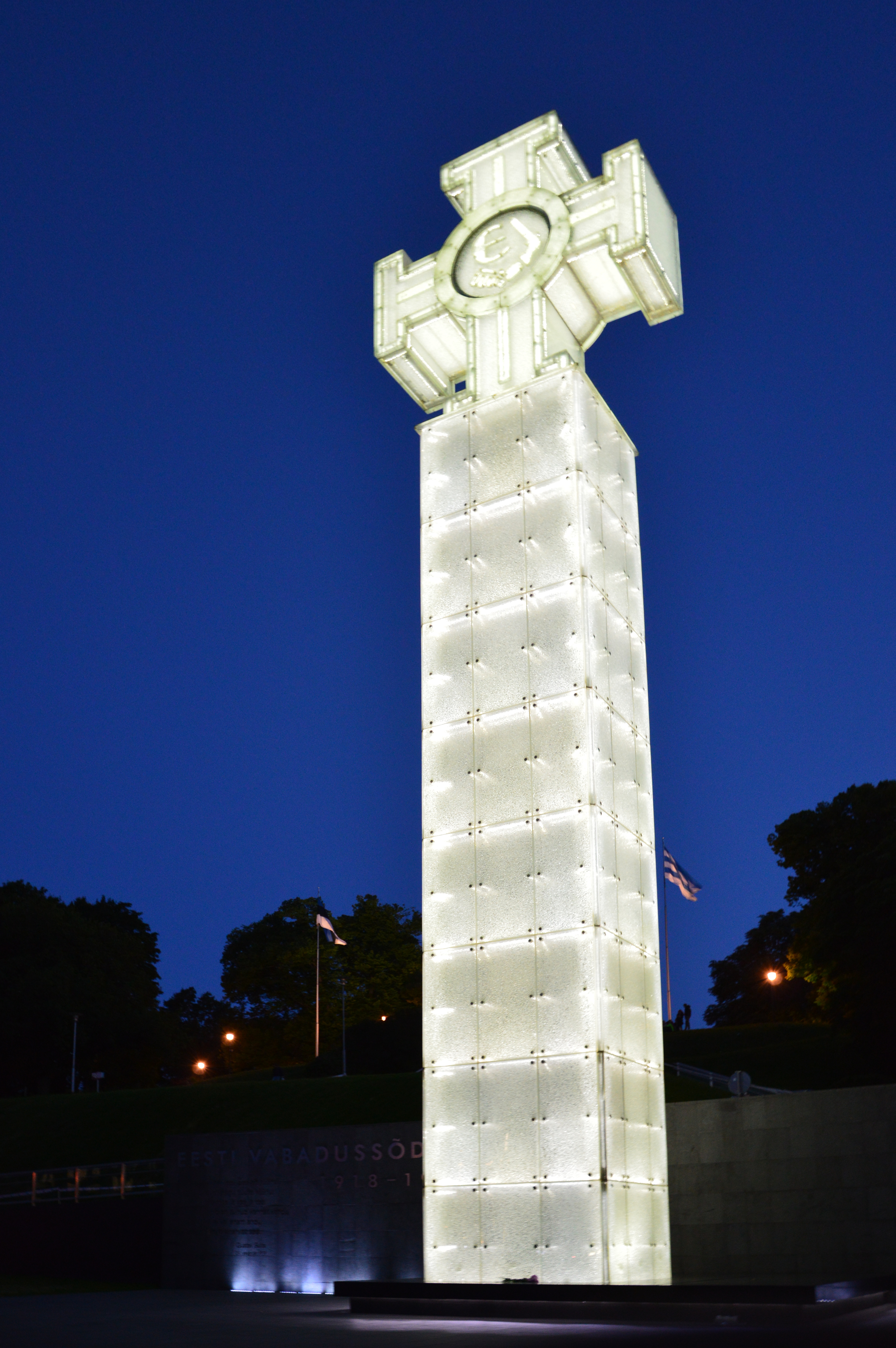
Independence War Victory Column

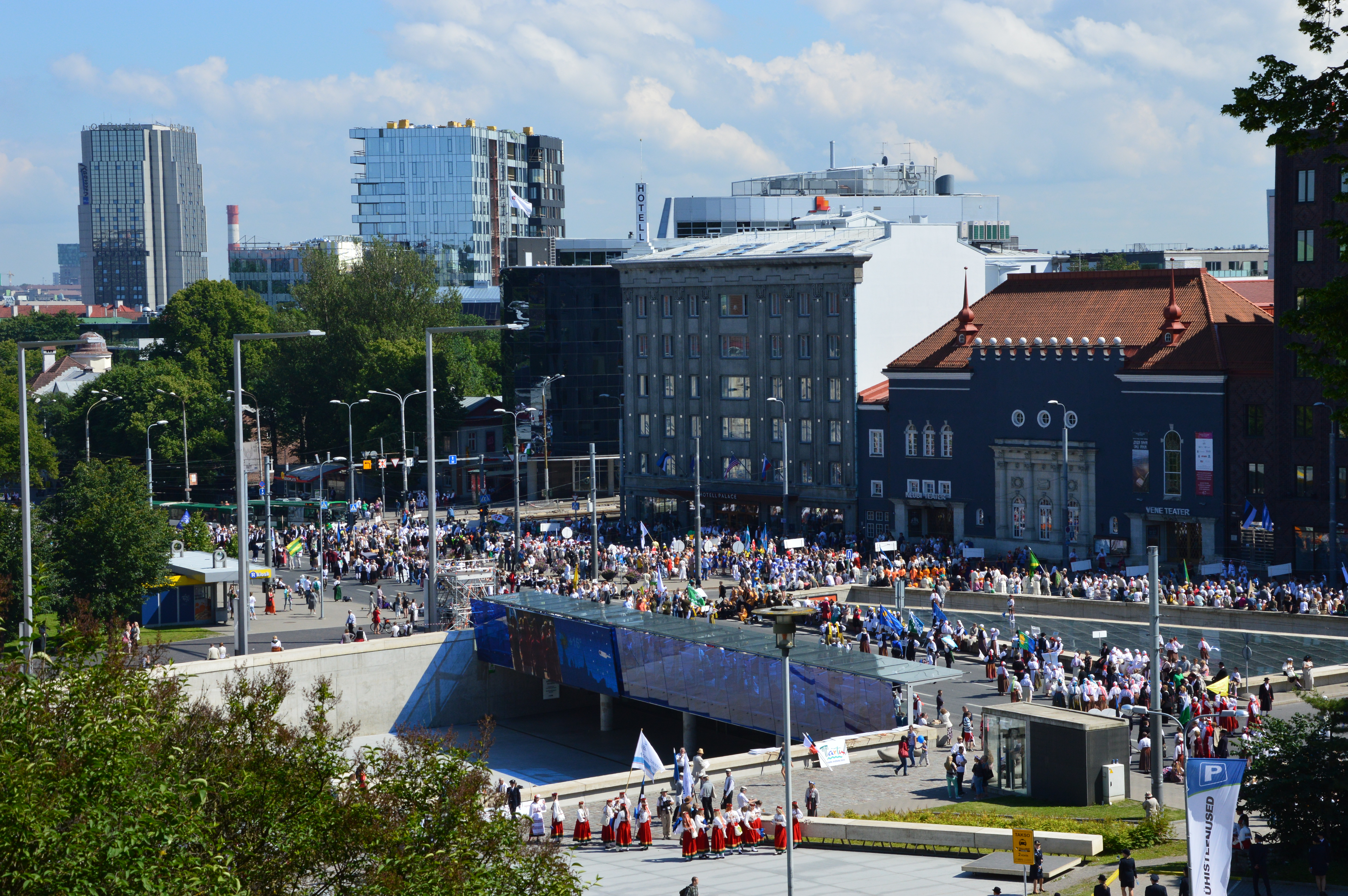
Freedom Square in 2014

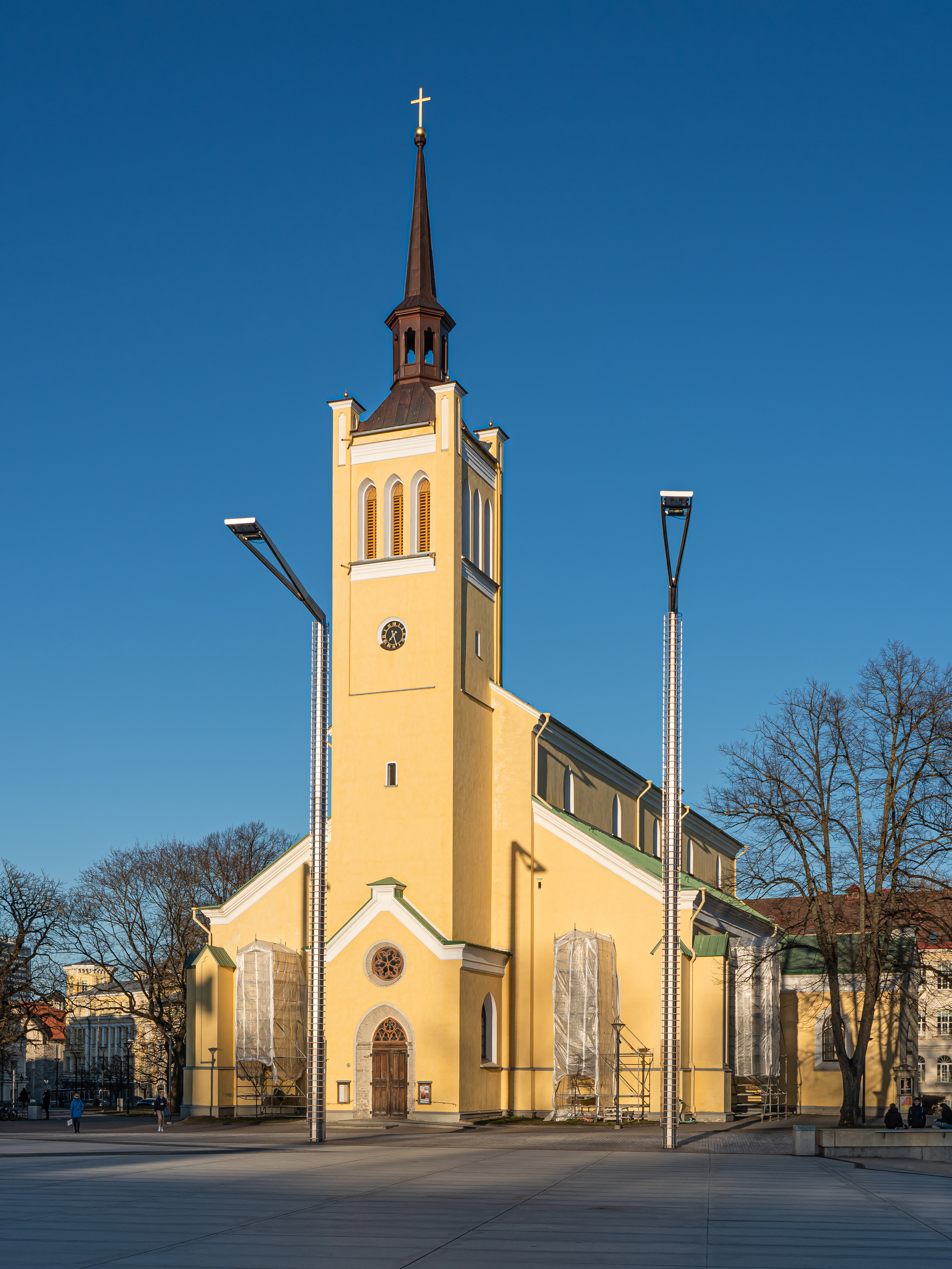
St. John's Church on the eastern side of the square

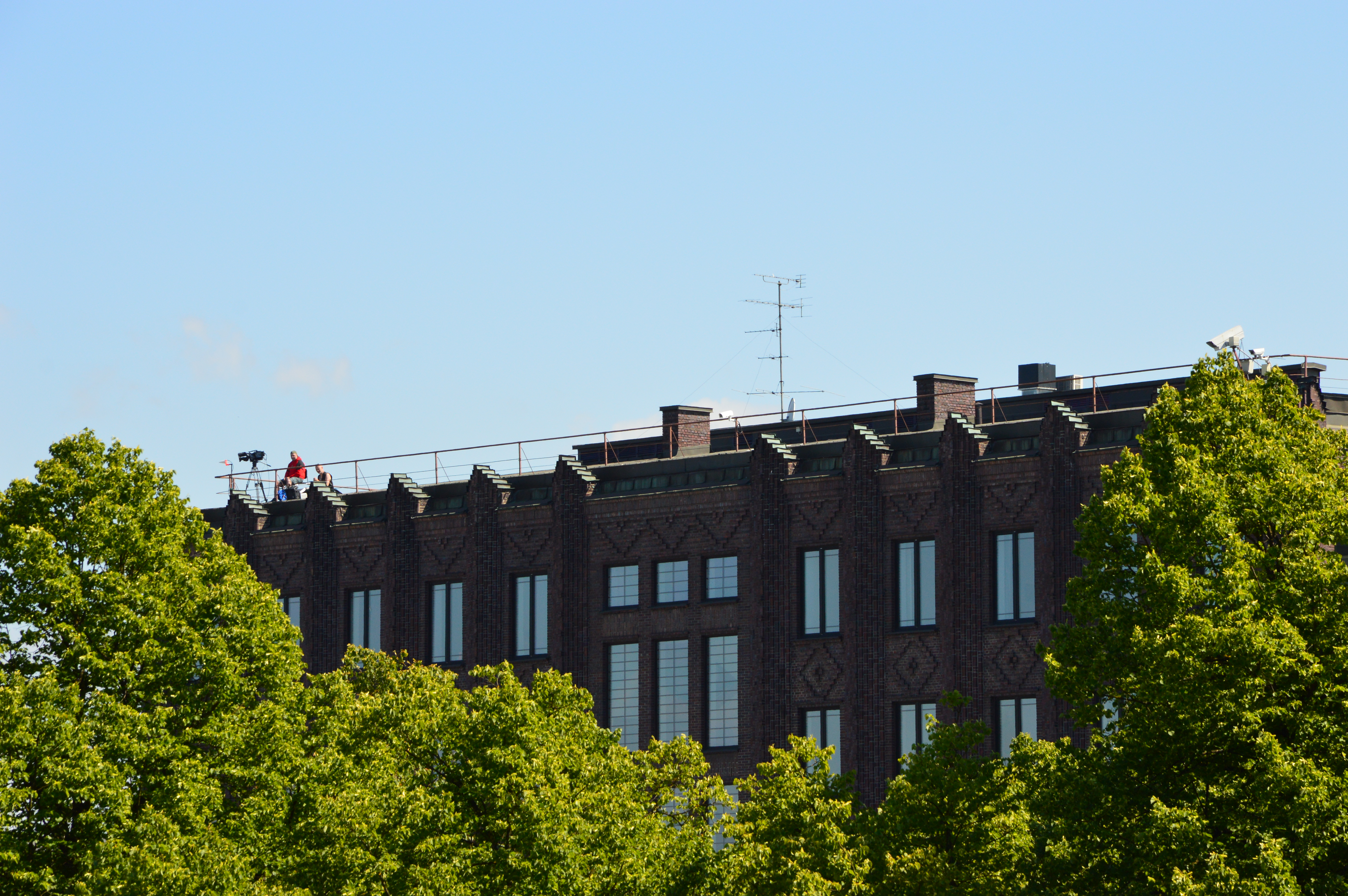
Tallinn City Office on the southern side of the square

== See also ==
- Independence War Victory Column
- Town Hall Square, Tallinn
