= LAHT =

LAHT May refer to

- High-strength low-alloy steel (LAHT)
- Laht, an Estonian surname.
- Latin American Herald Tribune, an online newspaper in Venezuela.
