= St. John's Church, Tallinn =

Church building in Tallinn, Estonia

Coordinates: 59°26′01″N 24°44′44″E

St John's Church
- The Parish Church of Saint John the Evangelist
- Jaani kirik
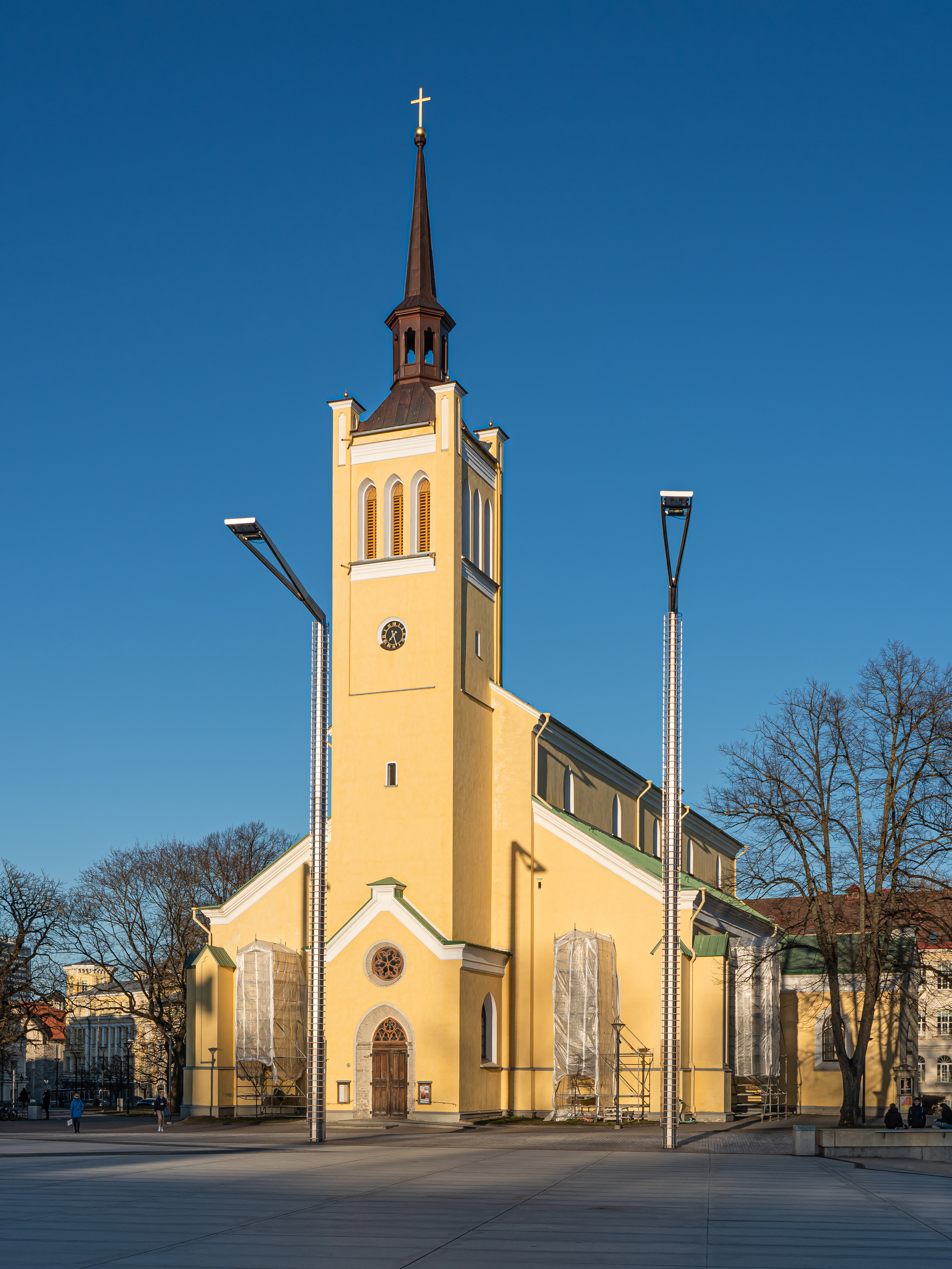
- St John's Church
- Location: Tallinn
- Country: Estonia
- Denomination: Estonian Evangelical Lutheran Church
- Website: Church website

History
- Status: Active
- Founder: Cristoph August Gablerilt
- Dedication: John the Evangelist
- Consecrated: 17 December 1867

Architecture
- Functional status: Parish Church
- Architect: Christoph August Gabler
- Architectural type: Church
- Style: Neo-Gothic
- Years built: 1862-1867
- Groundbreaking: 8 September 1862

Administration
- Diocese: Tallinn

Clergy
- Archbishop: Urmas Viilma

St. John's Church (Estonian: Jaani kirik) is a large Lutheran parish church in Tallinn, Estonia. It is dedicated to Saint John the Evangelist, a disciple of Jesus Christ and author of the fourth Christian Gospel. Construction began in 1862, and the church was opened in 1867.

== History ==
From the time of the Reformation, Estonia's primary religious tradition has been Lutheranism, with a catholic polity, and episcopal government. The national church of Estonia is the Estonian Evangelical Lutheran Church, of which St John's is a parish church. The motivation for construction was the large size of the existing congregation at the neighbouring Holy Spirit parish church (sometimes translated 'Holy Ghost'), which by the mid-nineteenth century numbered more than 14,000 members. Fundraising began in 1851 to provide a new parish church in the expanding suburbs of the 'new' town of Tallinn, at the lower level below the ancient hill-top city settlement (the Toompea). From September 1862 local craftsmen worked on construction, and the church was consecrated on 17 December 1867.

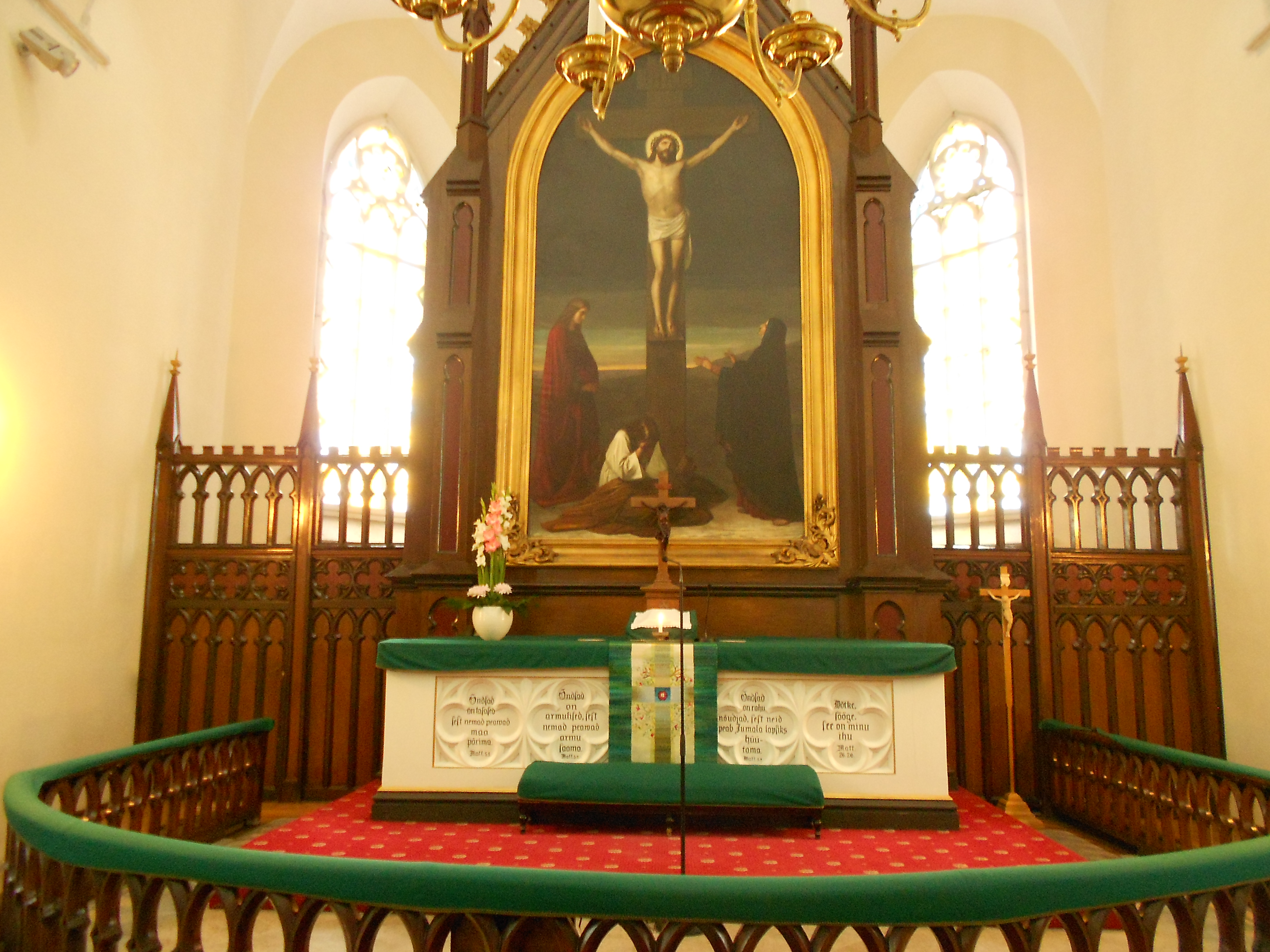
The green furnishings of the high altar are mostly plain velvet, but the main frontal panel is richly embroidered. Similar sets of alternative colours are used at other periods of the church year.

== Architecture ==
The church is built in the neo-Gothic style, with soaring lancet arches, and is a very large building, spanning three principal aisles, with a tall tower at the west end, topped with a decorative spire. There is a choir and chancel, a small semi-circular apse, and a large vestry. The church is built on the eastern edge of Freedom Square, Tallinn, and dominates the square, architecturally. The Master Mason and building supervisor was Carl Sensenberg, and the architect of the church was Christoph August Gabler (1820–1884), a native architect of the city. Plans to demolish the church were proposed in both the 1930s and the 1950s by architects and planners who felt its style jarred with the other buildings of Freedom Square; local opposition prevented the planned demolition in both cases.

== Interior, decoration, and ornamentation ==
The church received many gifts at its consecration, including artworks, precious metals (chalices and alms dishes) and a bell. The church still attracts gifts of contemporary artworks, which include modern style embroidered church furnishings (altar frontals, superfrontals, and pulpit falls - unusually the pulpit wears two falls, as it has two pulpit lecterns, allowing the preacher to choose the appropriate direction to face when delivering his address), and contemporary stained glass. A modern stained glass window depiction of the Blessed Virgin Mary, located in the Lady Chapel, is matched by a window on the opposite side of the church depicting the church's patron saint, St John the Evangelist. The large altarpiece which dominates the east end of the church, depicting the Crucifixion, is by Professor Karl Gottlieb Wenig, a graduate of the St. Petersburg Academy of Fine Arts, the same training institution as the church's architect, Gabler.

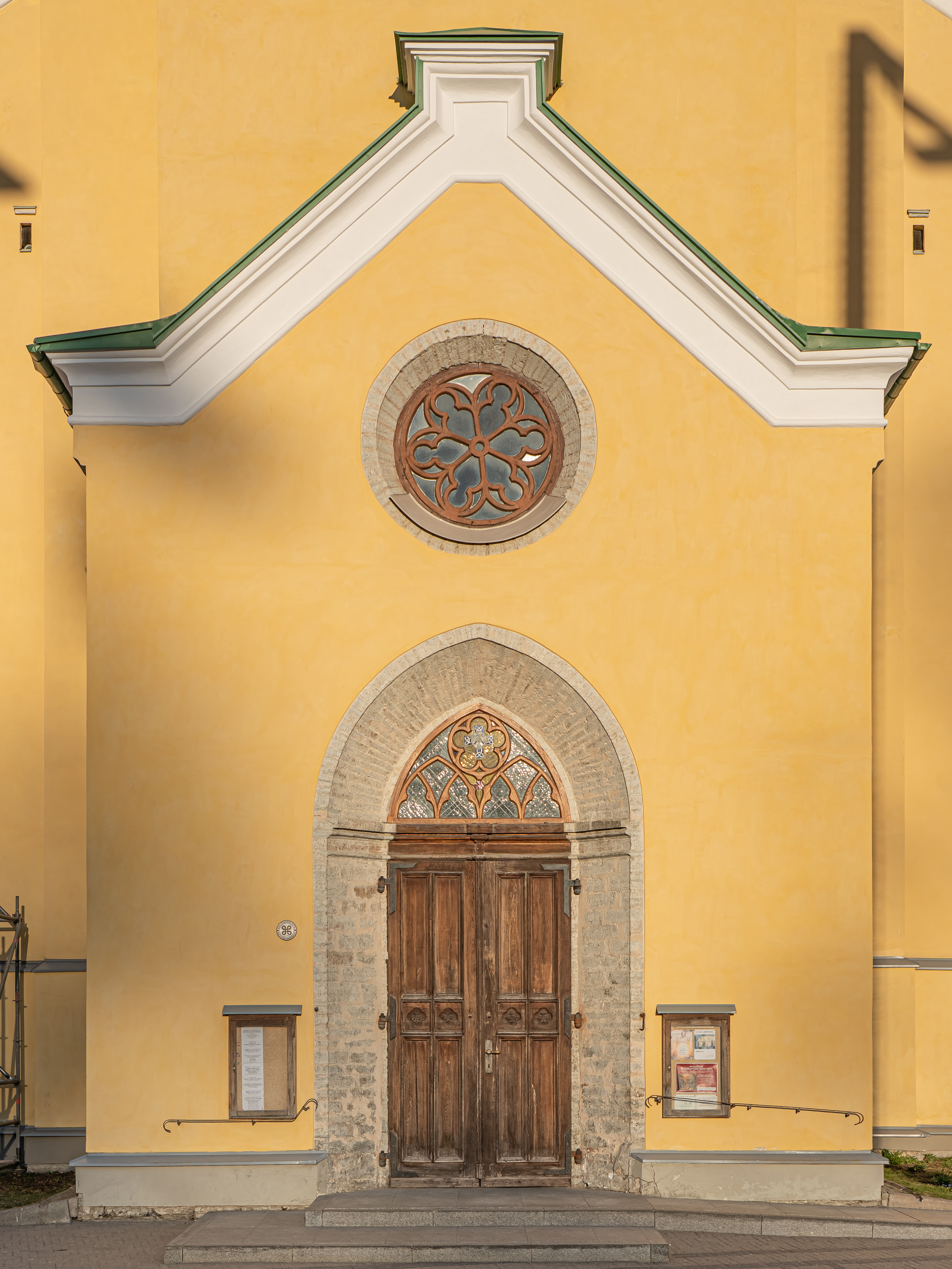
Church portal

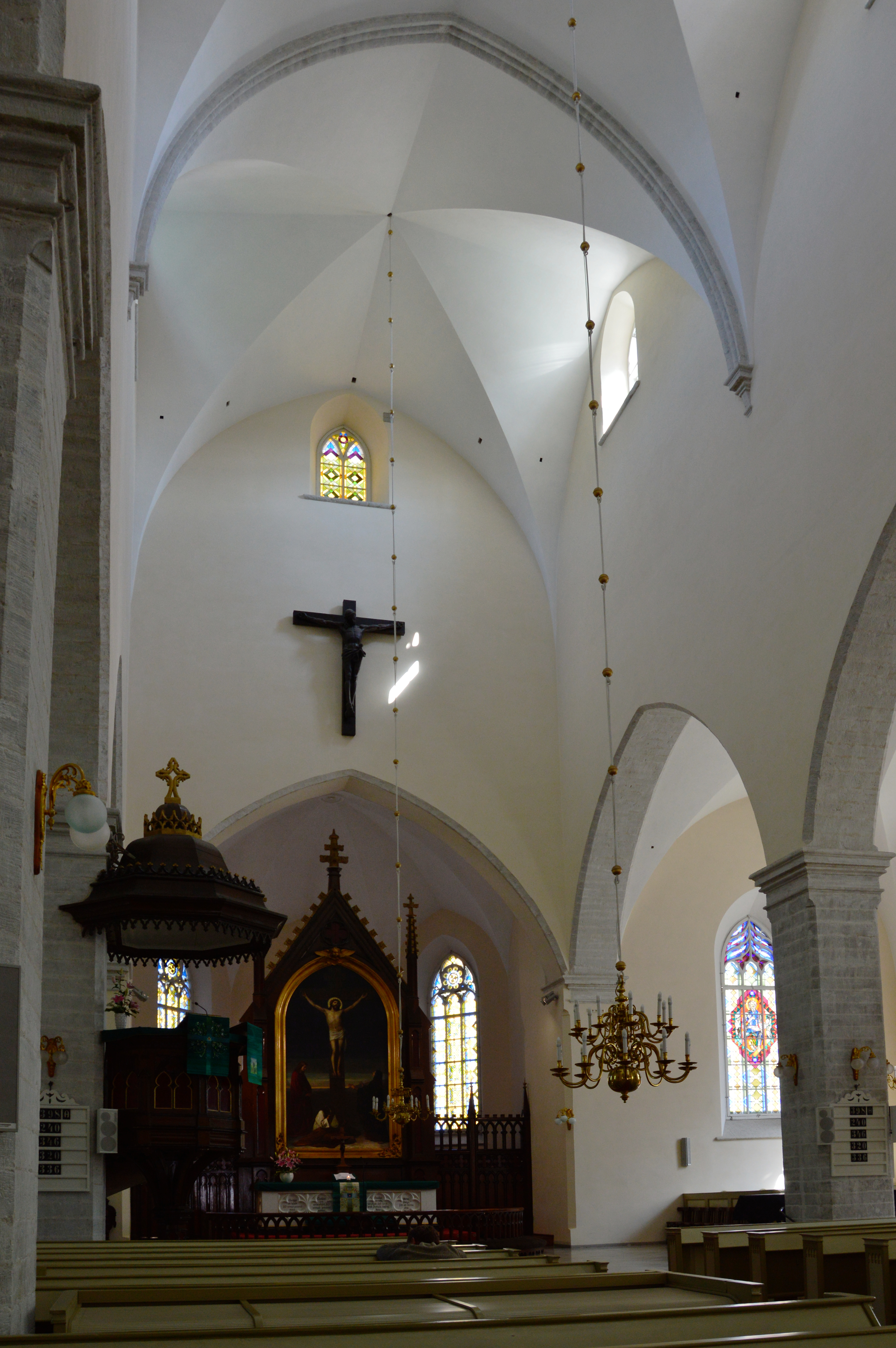
Interior

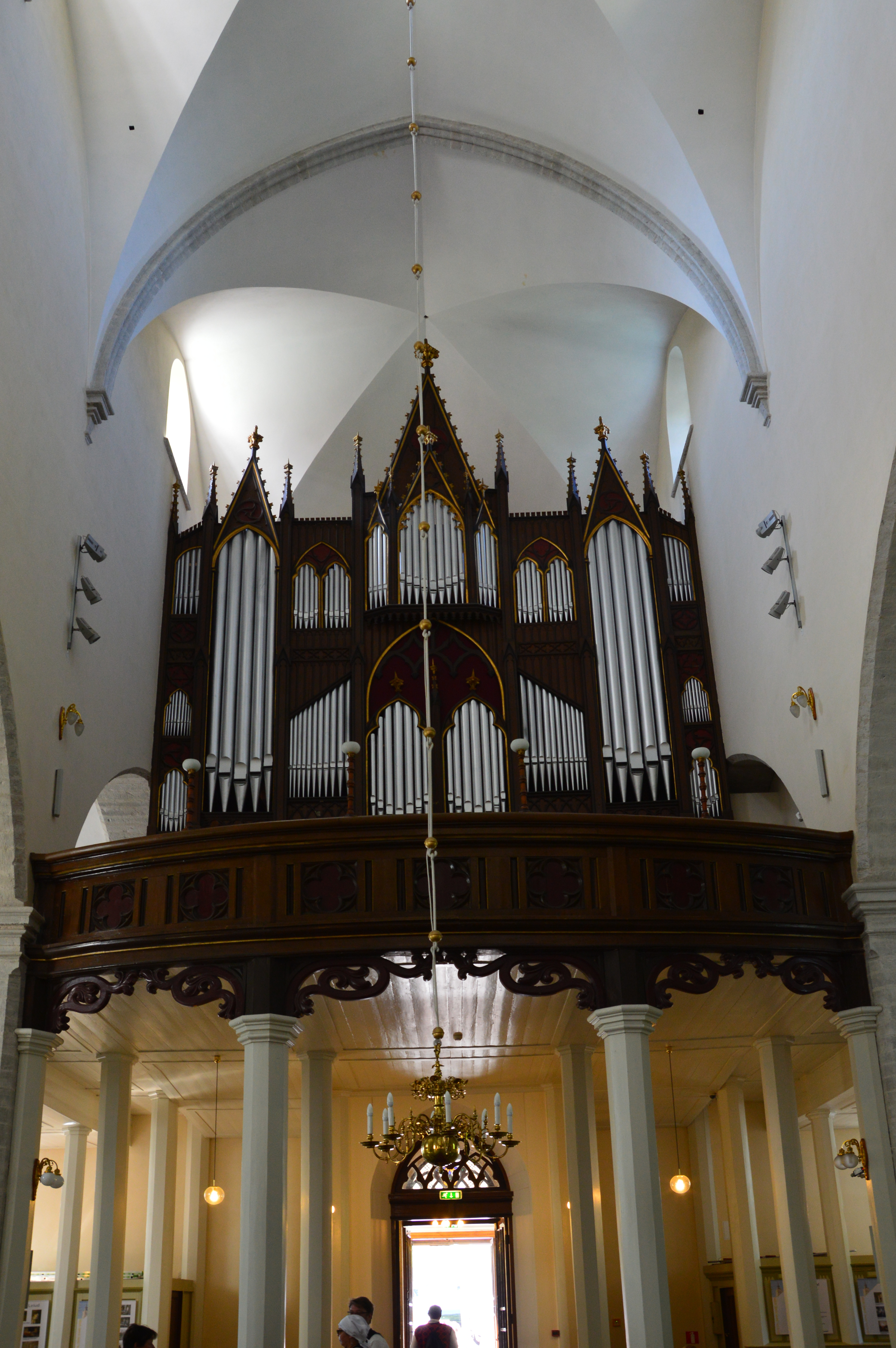
Pipe organ

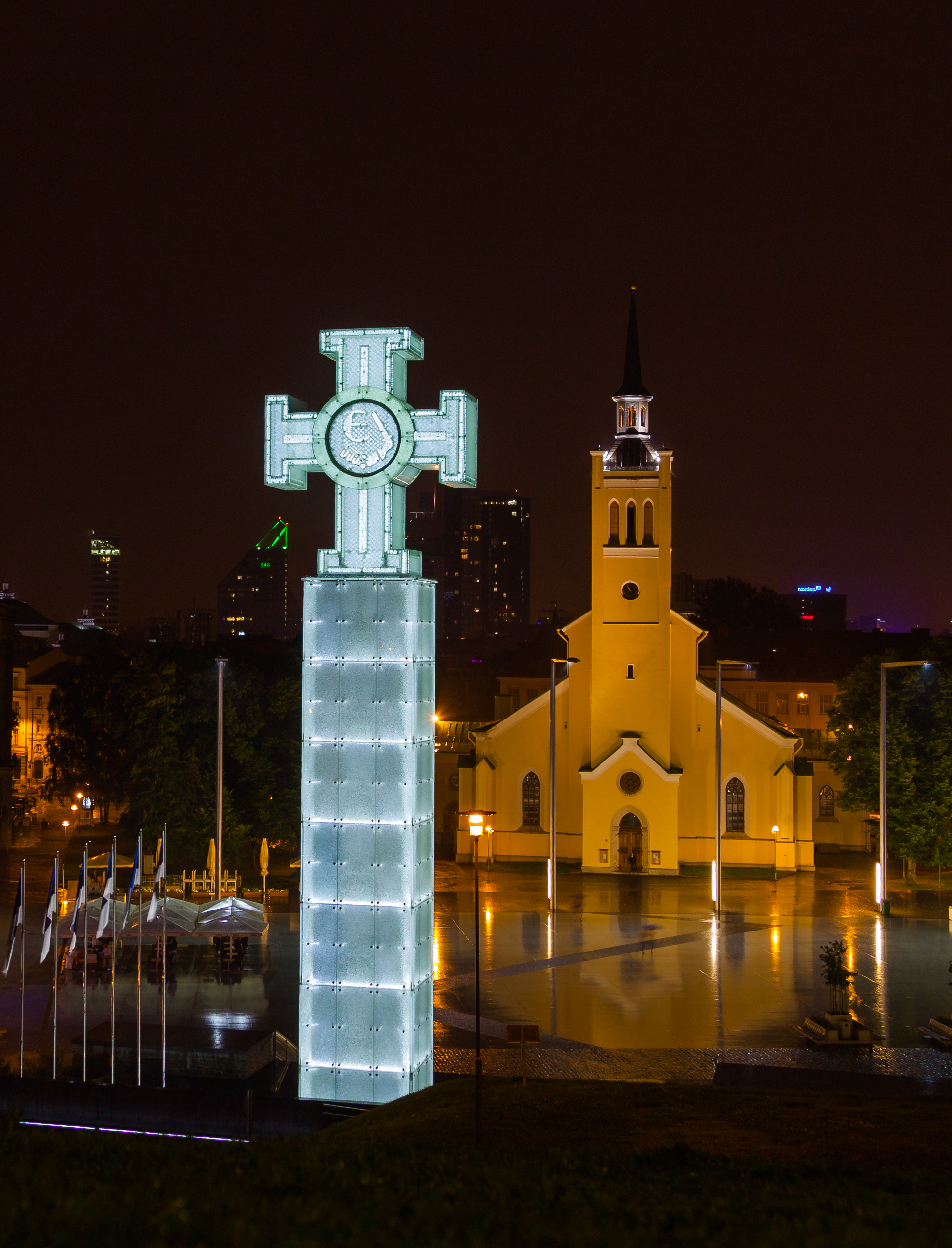
St John's Church and War of Independence Victory Column
