= Tarmo Laht =

Estonian architect

Tarmo Laht (born 22 March 1960) is an Estonian architect.

Laht was born in Kuressaare. He graduated from the Department of Architecture of the Tallinn Art University (today's Estonian Academy of Arts) in 1991, and now works in the Alver Arhitektid OÜ architectural bureau.

Works by Tarmo Laht include the Ferrum department store, De La Gardie department store and City Plaza office building.

== Works ==
- Restaurant in Pirita, 1992 (with Andres Alver, Tiit Trummal)
- Apartment building, 1999 (with Andres Alver)
- De La Gardie department store, 2000 (with Andres Alver, Tiit Trummal)
- Apartment building in Kadriorg, 2000 (with Andres Alver, Sven Koppel)
- Sports hall of the Wiedemanni Gymnasium in Haapsalu, 2001 (with Sven Koppel, Tiit Trummal, Ulla Mets)
- Ferrum department store, 2002 (with Andres Alver, Indrek Rünkla, Ulla Mets, Tiit Trummal)
- Pühajärve puhkekompleksi veekeskus, 2003 (with Andres Alver, Indrek Rünkla, Ulla Saar)
- City Plaza, 2005 (with Tiit Trummal, Andres Alver, Indrek Rünkla, Ulla Saar, Martin Melioranski)
