= Laht =

Family name

Laht is an Estonian surname (meaning "bay" or "gulf"), with notable bearers including:

- Aare Laht (born 1948), chemist
- Tarmo Laht (born 1960), architect
- Uno Laht (1924–2008), writer and poet
- Urmas Laht (born 1955), politician
