= Tallinn City Government =

Executive body of Tallinn, Estonia

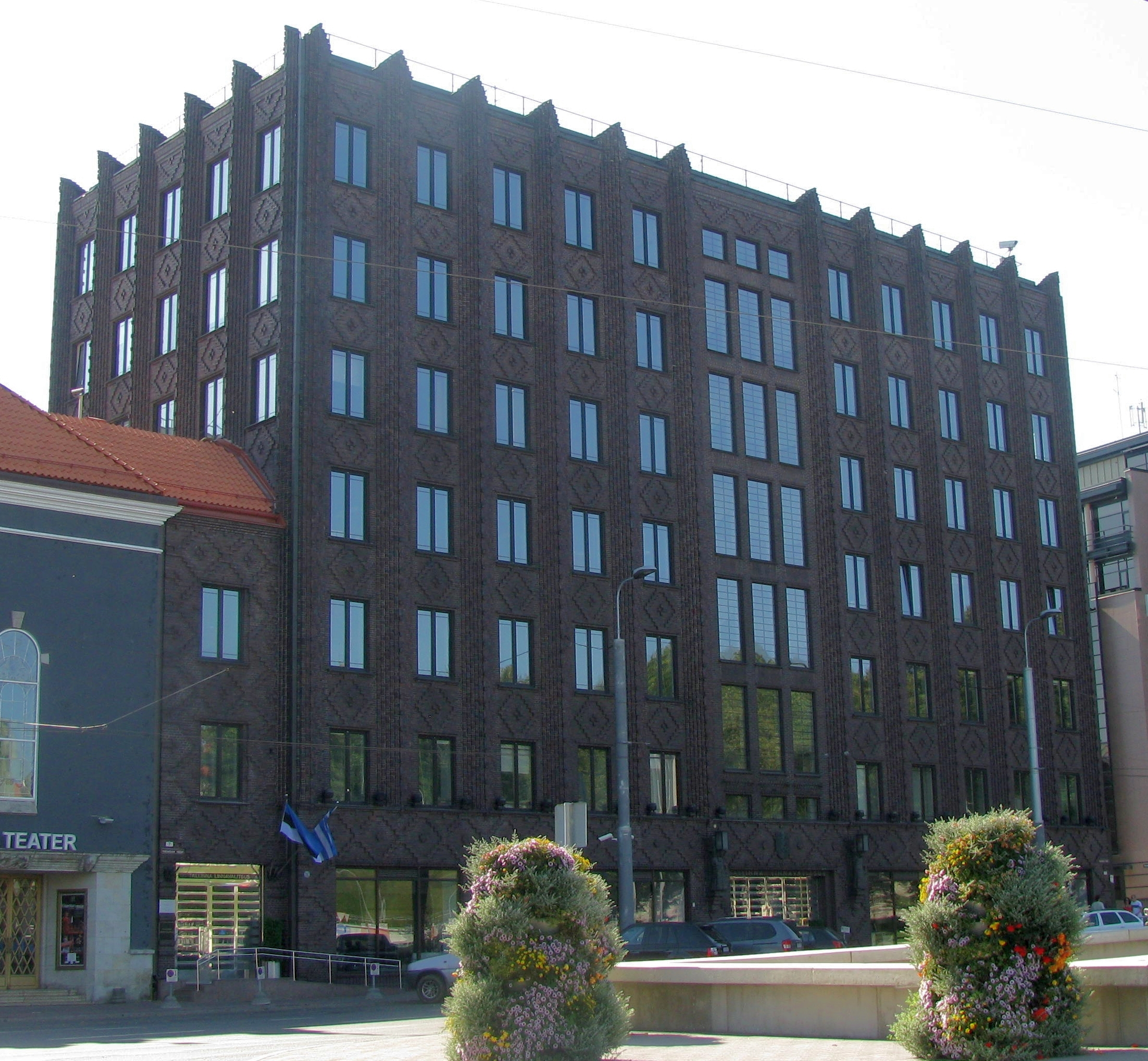
Tallinn City Government at the Freedom Square in 2011

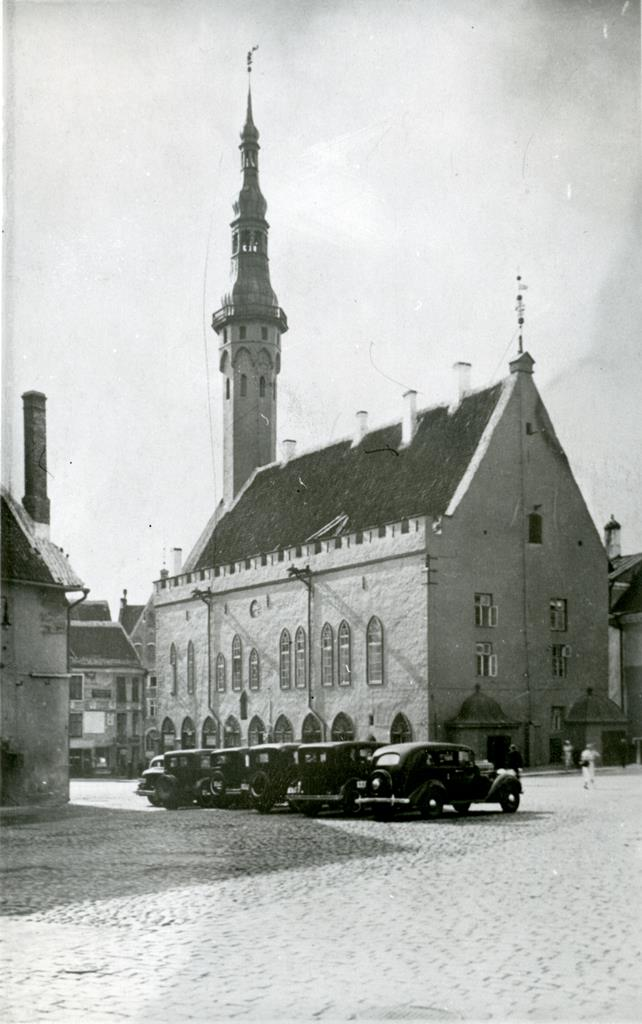
Tallinn Town Hall in 1930s

Tallinn City Government (Estonian: Tallinna linnavalitsus) is the executive body, which conducts the work of all institutions (except City Council Office) and subinstitutions of Tallinn, Estonia. The body's building is located at Freedom Square.

The body has eight members: mayor and seven deputy mayors. Current (2024) mayor is Jevgeni Ossinovski. The work of the body takes place as session. Regular sessions are held on Wednesdays.

Before WWII, the body used Tallinn Town Hall.
