= Tiit Trummal =

Estonian architect (born 1954)

Tiit Trummal (born 18 July 1954 in Tartu) is a notable Estonian architect.

Tiit Trummal graduated from the 2nd Secondary School of Tartu (today's Miina Härma Gymnasium). From 1972 he studied in the State Art Institute of the Estonian SSR (today's Estonian Academy of Arts) in the department of architecture. He graduated from the institute in 1977.

From 1980 to 1984 Tiit Trummal worked in the state design bureau Eesti Maaehitusprojekt (Estonian Rural Design). From 1984 to 1989 he worked as the chief architect of Tallinn. From 1990 to 2006 Tiit Trummal worked in the architectural bureau Alver&Trummal Architects OÜ. Currently Tiit Trummal works in the Tiit Trummal Arhitektid OÜ.

Most notable works by Tiit Trummal are the Ferrum department store in Kuressaare, De La Gardie department store in Tallinn, the City Plaza office building and the new design of the Vabaduse Square (Freedom Square) in Tallinn. Tiit Trummal is a member of the Union of Estonian Architects.

== Works ==
- Pioneers' Camp in Ilmjärve, 1983
- Restaurant in Pirita, 1992 (with Andres Alver)
- Monument to Hugo Treffner, 1996 (with Mati Karmin)
- De La Gardie department store, 1999 (with Andres Alver)
- Reconstruction of the old hospital into a hotel on the Roosikrantsi Street, 1997 (with Andres Alver)
- Ferrum department store Kuressaare, 2002, (with Andres Alver)
- Apartment buildings in Kadriorg, 2004
- City Plaza, 2006, (with Andres Alver)
- Freedom Square (Estonian: Vabaduse väljak), 2009 (with Andres Alver, Veljo Kaasik)
- Monument to Marie Under, 2010 (with Mati Karmin)
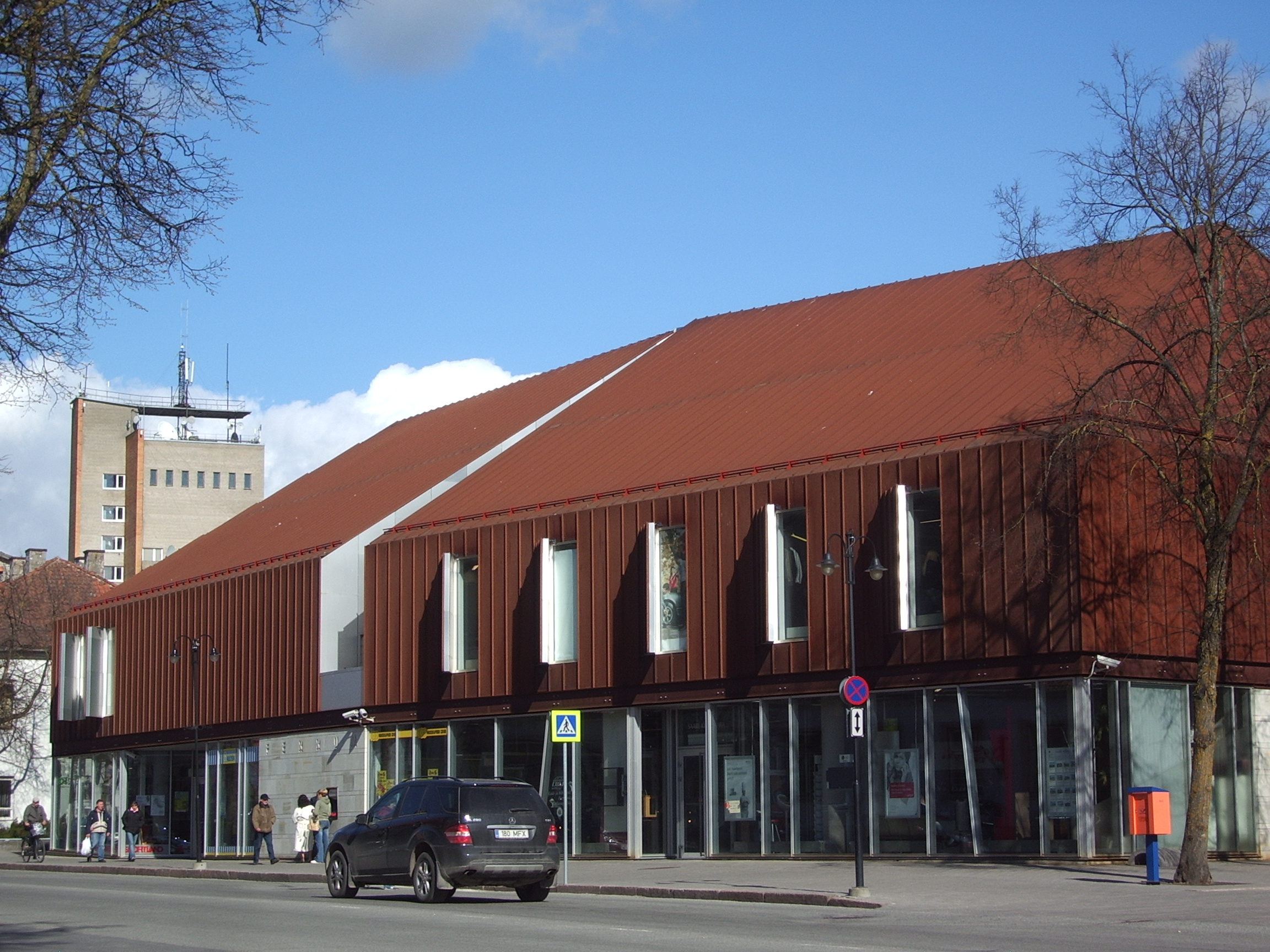
Ferrum department store in Kuressaare, 2002

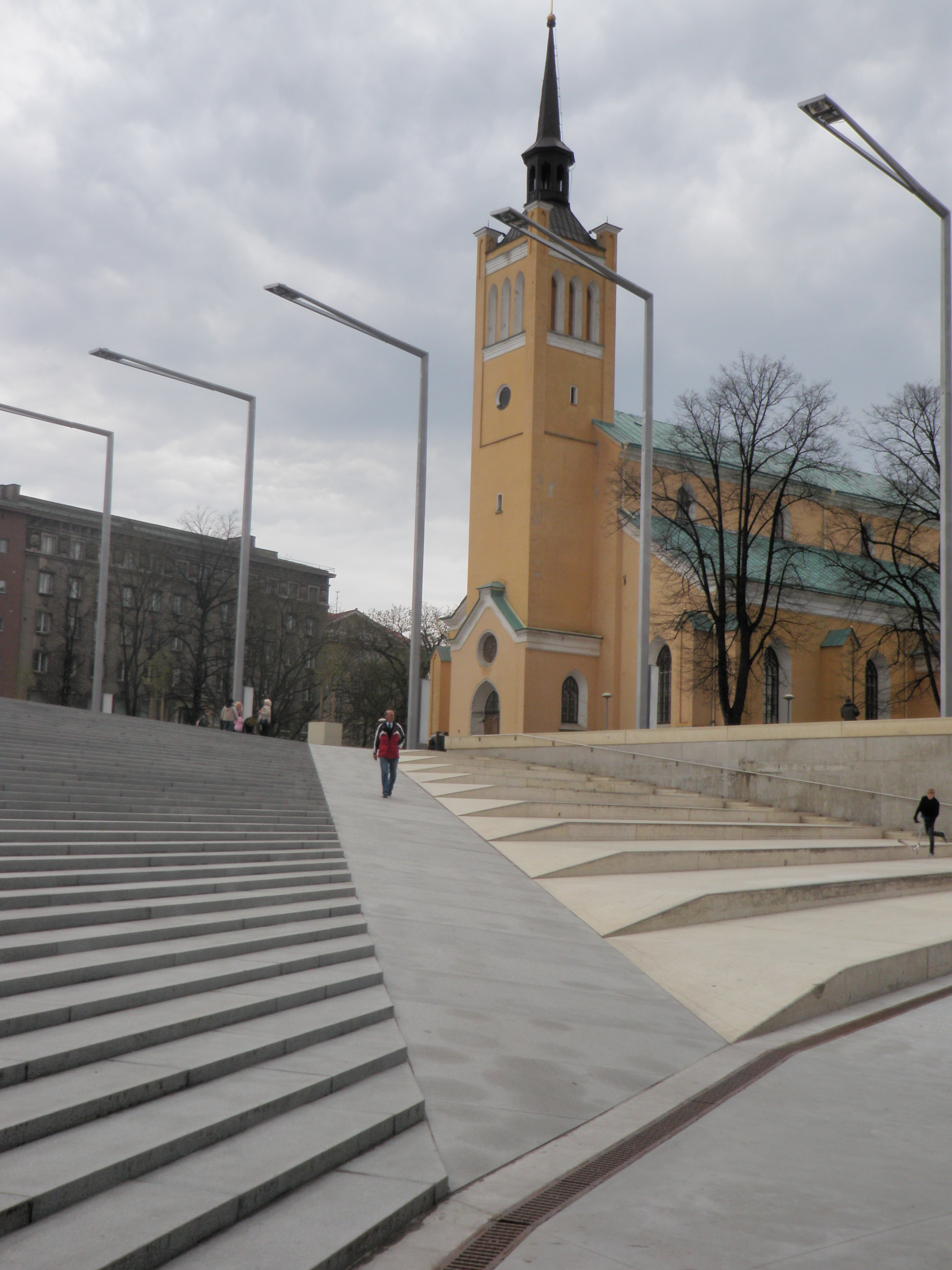
Reconstructed Freedom Square in Tallinn, 2009.

== Competitions ==
- The planning competition for Harju Street in the Old Town of Tallinn, 1987; I prize
- New design of the Freedom Square, 1998; I prize
