= Andres Alver =

Estonian architect

Andres Alver (born 23 December 1953) is an Estonian architect.

Born in Tartu, from 1961 to 1972, Alver studied in the 2nd Secondary School of Tartu (today's Miina Härma Gymnasium). From 1972, Alver studied in the State Art Institute of the Estonian SSR (today's Estonian Academy of Arts) in the department of architecture, graduating in 1977.

From 1977 to 1990, Alver worked in the architectural office of the S. M. Kirov collective farm. From 1990 to 2006, Alver worked in the architectural bureau Alver&Trummal OÜ. From 2006 to present Alver has worked in the A. Alver Architects OÜ architectural office.

The works of Alver from the 1980s include a recreational home in Loksa, restaurant Toidutare in Kose-Risti and a shop in Tallinn. Most notable works by Alver after the 1990s include restaurant Toidutare in Pirita, De La Gardie department store, City Plaza office building and the new design of the Vabaduse Väljak (Freedom Square) in Tallinn.

Alver is currently an editorial board member of Ehituskunst: Estonian Architectural Review magazine. He resides in the rural municipality of Viimsi, Estonia and is a professor of urban design at the Estonian Academy of Arts.

Alver is a member of the Union Of Estonian Architects.

== Works ==
- Playground in the S.M Kirov collective farm center, Viimsi, 1980
- Recreational home in Loksa, 1981
- Apartment building in Raua street, Tallinn, 1991
- Toidutare restaurant in Pirita, 1992 (with Tiit Trummal)
- De La Gardie department store in Tallinn old town, 1999 (with T. Trummal)
- Reconstruction of an old hospital to a hotel in Roosikrantsi street, Tallinn, 1997, (with T. Trummal)
- Ferrum department store in Kuressaare, Saaremaa, 2002, (with T. Trummal)
- City Plaza office building in Tallinn, 2006, (with T. Trummal)
- New design of Freedom Square, Tallinn, 2009 (with T. Trummal, Veljo Kaasik)
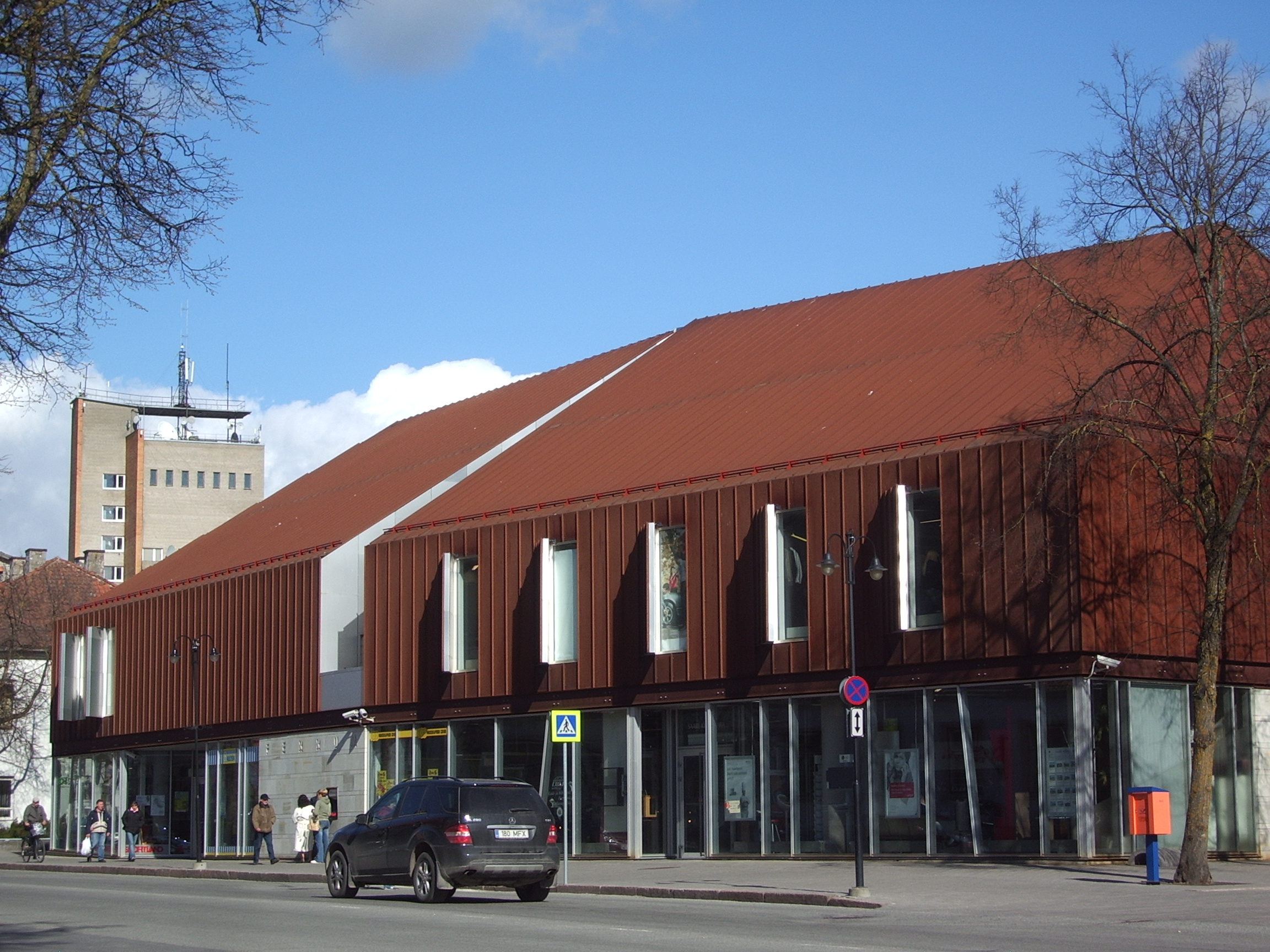
Ferrum department store in Kuressaare, 2002

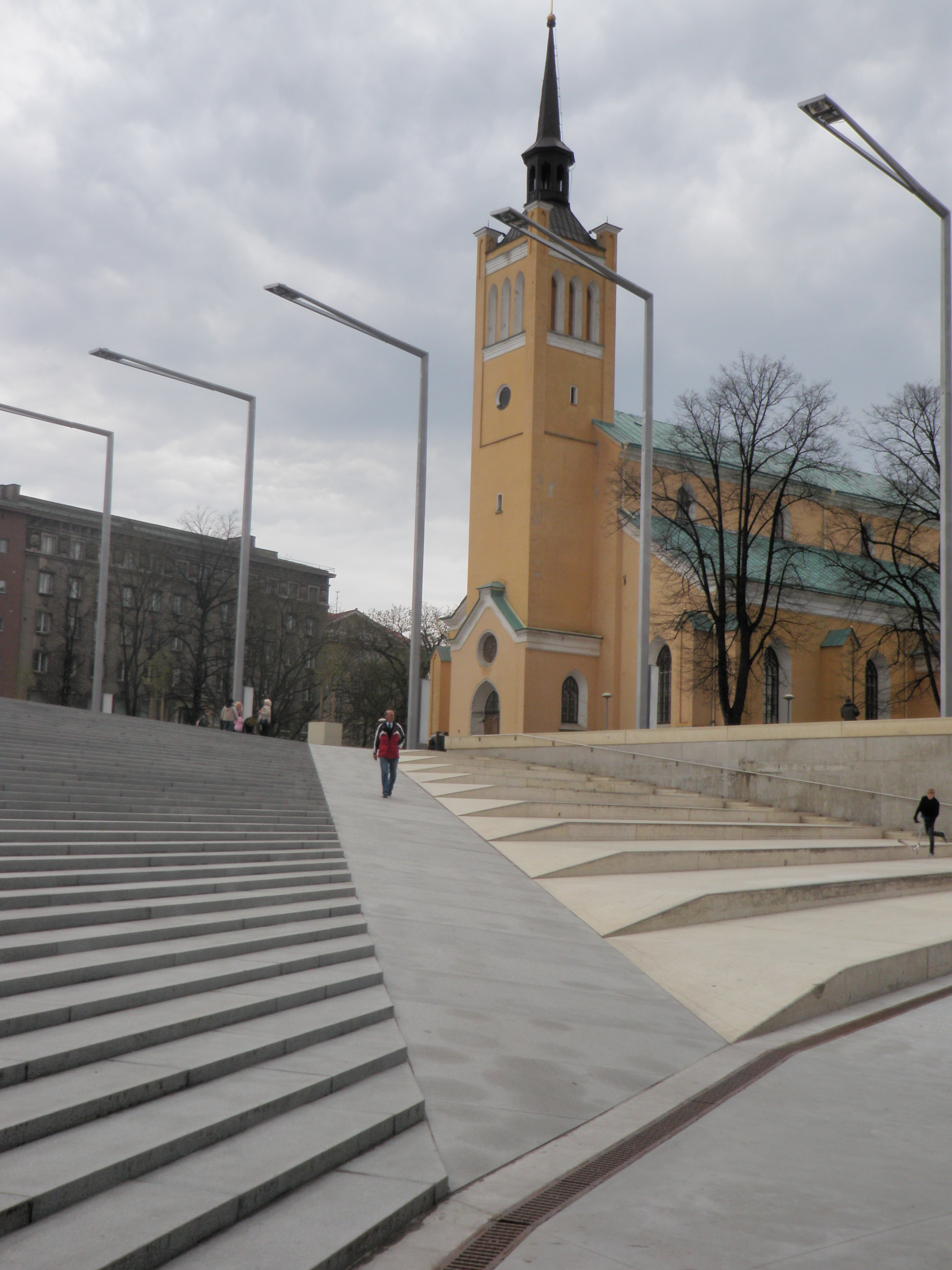
Reconstructed Freedom Square in Tallinn, 2009.

== Competitions ==
- Extension of the 2nd Secondary School of Tallinn, 1981
- Arktikum in Rovaniemi, 1983
- Harju street in Tallinn, 1987; 1. prize
- Hotel and conference center in Pirita, 1992; 1. prize
- New design for the Freedom Square, Tallinn, 1998; 1. prize
- New Townhall of Tallinn, 2009; 2. prize

== Sources ==
1. Eesti kunstnike ja arhitektide bibliograafiline leksikon. Tallinn: Eesti Entsüklopeediakirjastus. 1996. p. 26. ISBN 5-89900-049-X.
2. Union of Estonian Architects, members, Andres Alver
3. Ingrid Lillemägi: Ferrum Centre in Saaremaa in Kuressaare, MAJA 2-2003
4. Kurg Andres: From Post-Socialism to the City of the Spectacle. Two Commercial Buildings in Tallinn – City Plaza and 4 Rävala Avenue, MAJA 1-2007
5. Vabaduse väljak (Liberty Square), Tallinn. Q&A with Andres Alver, Tiit Trummal and Veljo Kaasik, MAJA 3-2009
