= War of Independence Victory Column =

Monument in Freedom Square, Tallinn, Estonia

War of Independence Victory Column Vabadussõja võidusammas
- Vabaduse väljak, Tallinn; Freedom Square, Tallinn
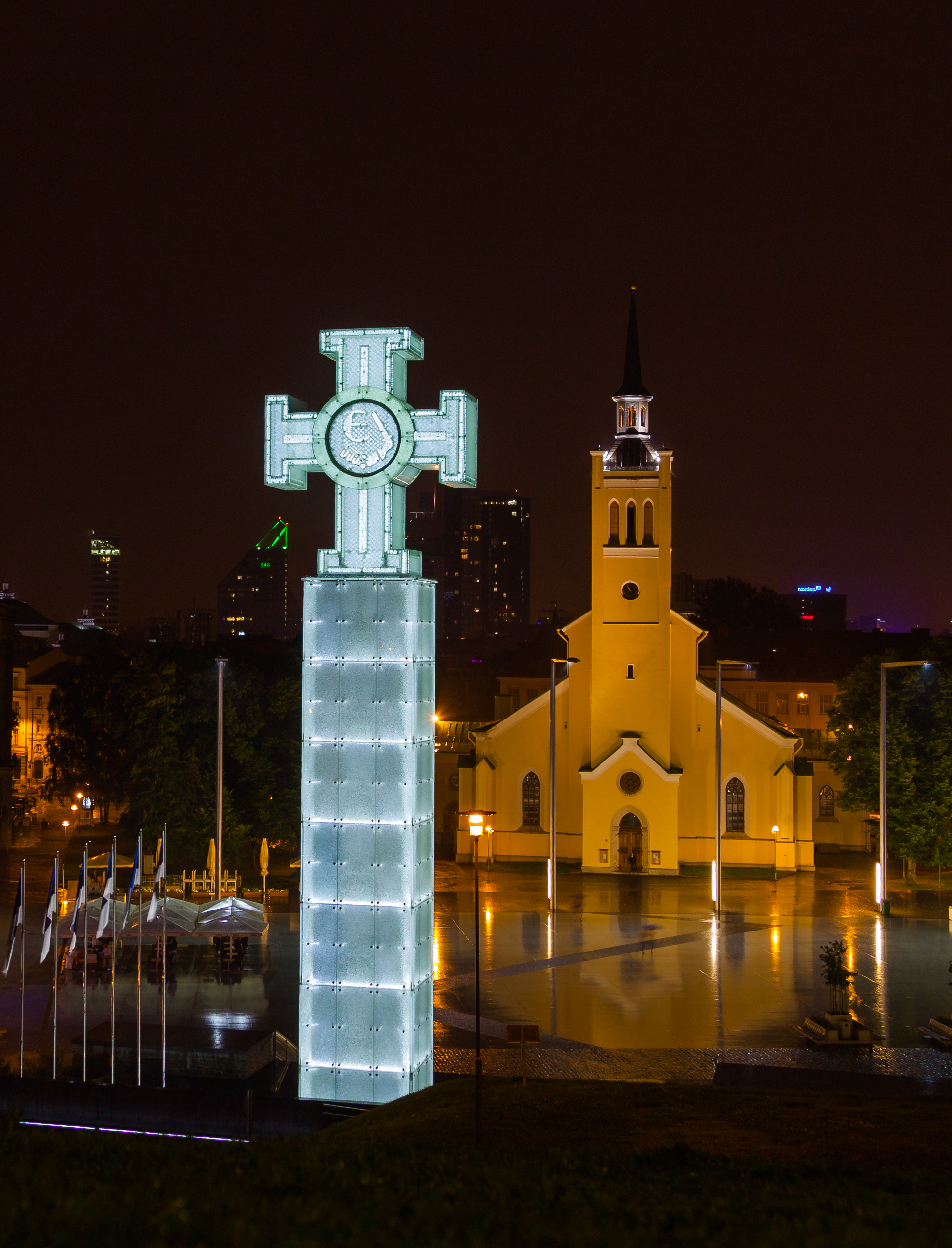
- For soldiers and civilians killed in action during the Estonian War of Independence between 1918 and 1920.
- Unveiled: Victory Day on 23 June 2009
- Location: 59.4340505°N 24.7433835°E; Tallinn, Estonia
- Designed by: Rainer Sternfeld, Andri Laidre, Kadri Kiho, Anto Savi
- (Estonian: "Eesti Vabadussõda 1918–1920") (English: "Estonian War of Independence 1918–1920")

The Cross of Liberty and the Monument to the War of Independence (Estonian: Vabadussõja võidusammas) is located in Freedom Square, Tallinn, Estonia. It was opened on 23 June 2009 as a memorial for those who fell during the Estonian War of Independence, through which the people of Estonia will be able to commemorate all those who had fought for freedom and independence. The pillar is 23.5 m high and consists of 143 glass plates. The memorial incorporates the Cross of Liberty, Estonia's most distinguished award established in 1919.

== History ==
The idea of creating a monument was conceived in 1919, before the end of the war. During the War of Independence in 1918–1920, 4,000 people were killed, and 14,000 wounded on the Estonian side.

In 1936, a law was passed to establish a nationwide monument in commemoration of the war. Preparatory work was interrupted by the Second World War and subsequent Soviet occupation. After Estonia regained independence in 1991, the question of establishing a national monument for the commemoration of the War of Independence was raised again. In the spring of 2005, the Riigikogu decided that a column of victory in memory of the War would be erected at the Freedom Square in Tallinn.

In 2006, a design competition for the monument received more than 40 entries. The winning entry "Libertas" was designed by Rainer Sternfeld, Andri Laidre, Kadri Kiho and Anto Savi. Celander Ehitus OÜ was selected as the prime constructor.

== Gallery ==
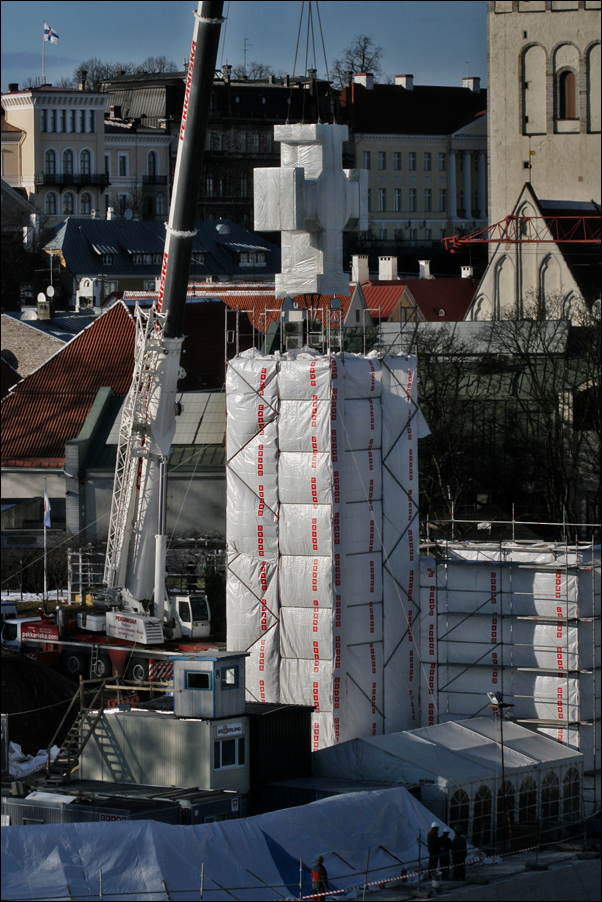

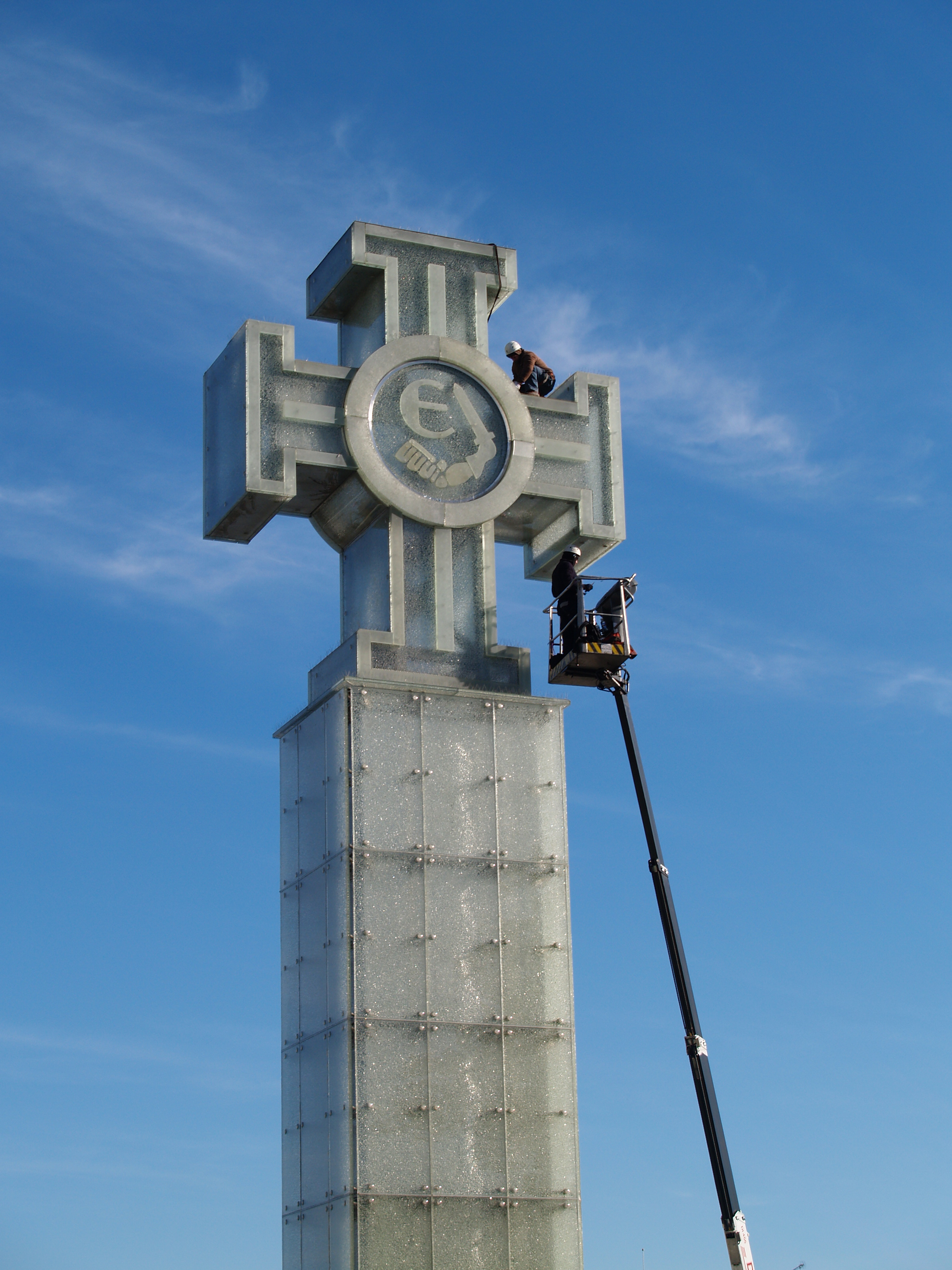

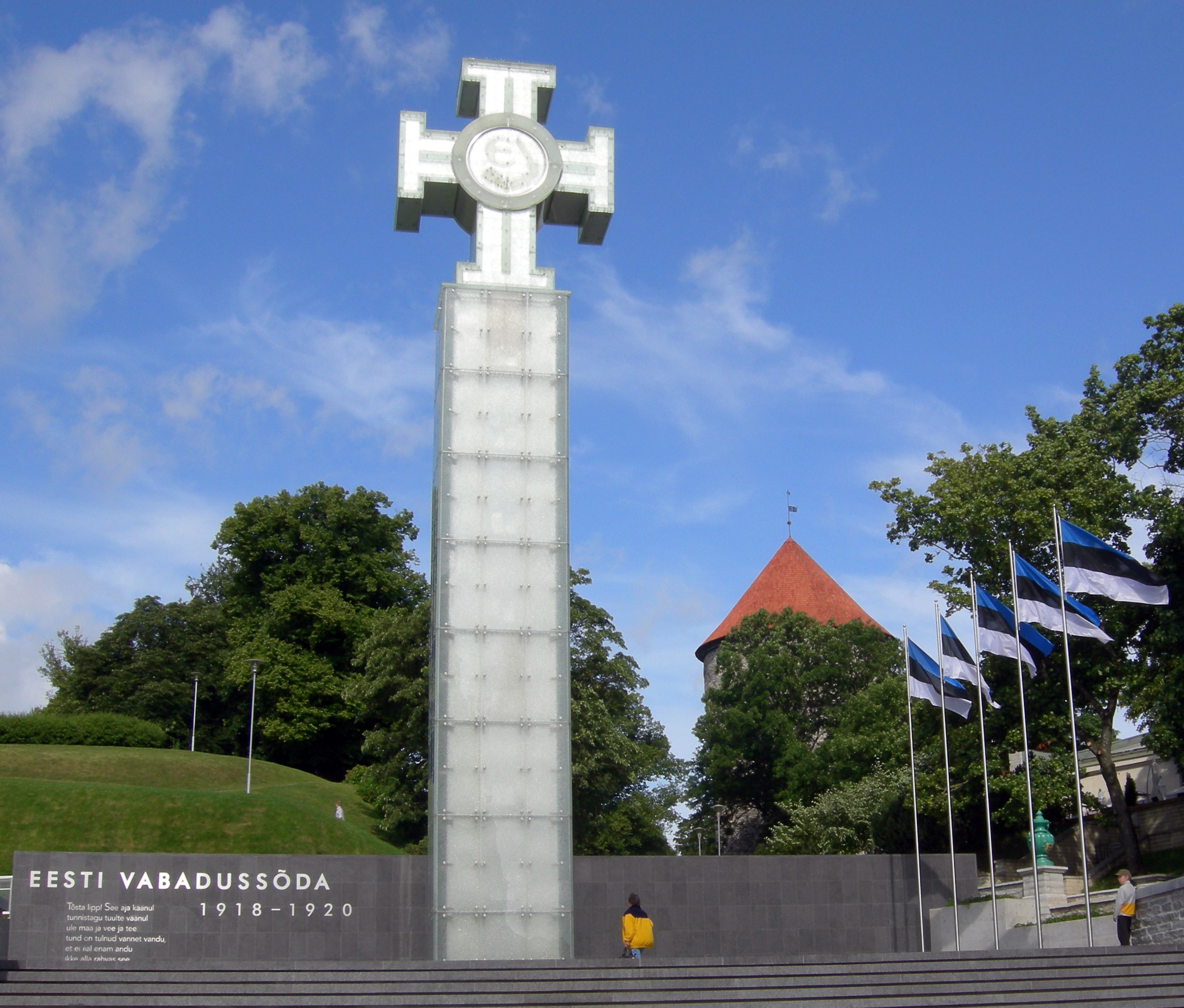

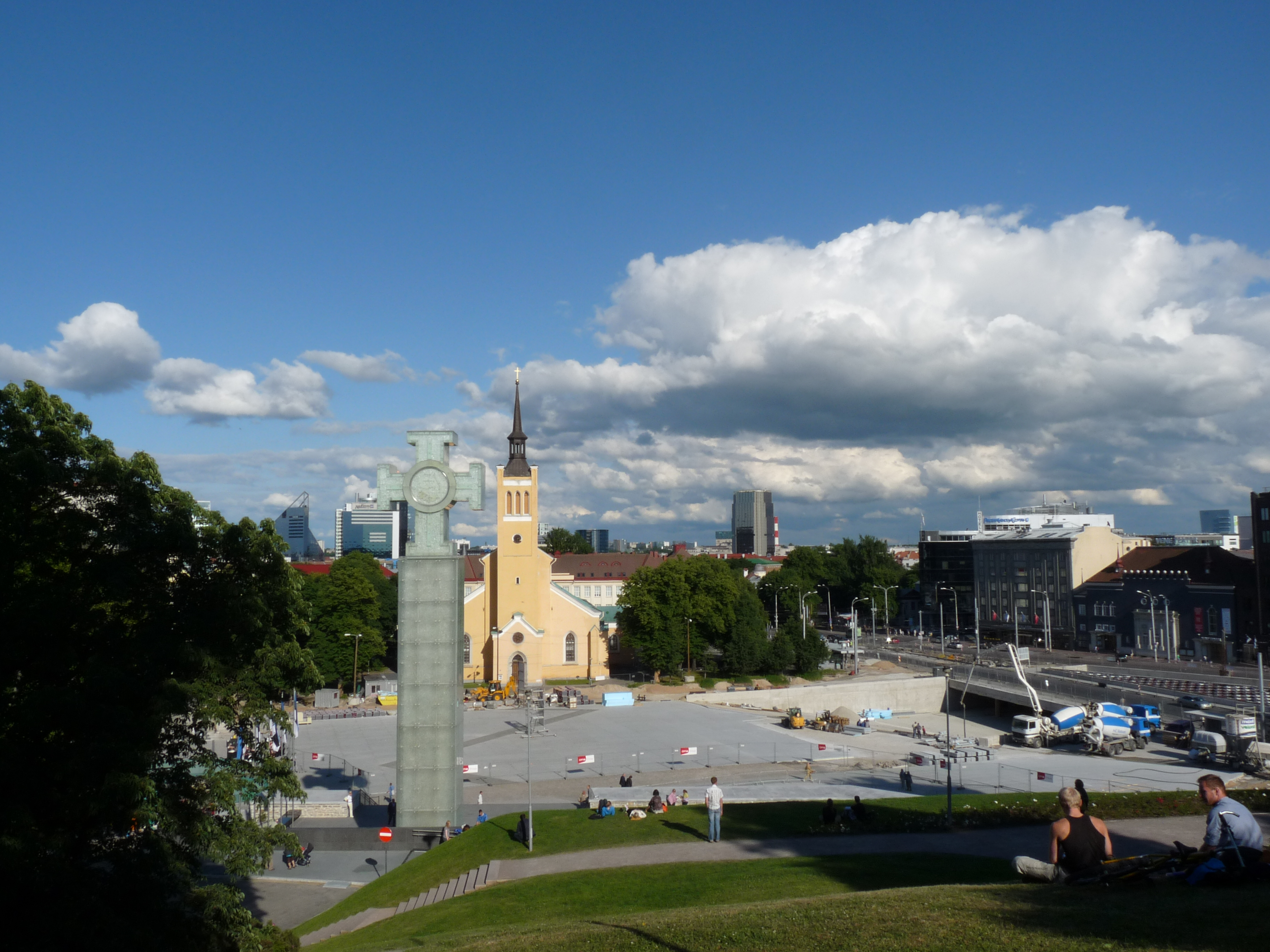

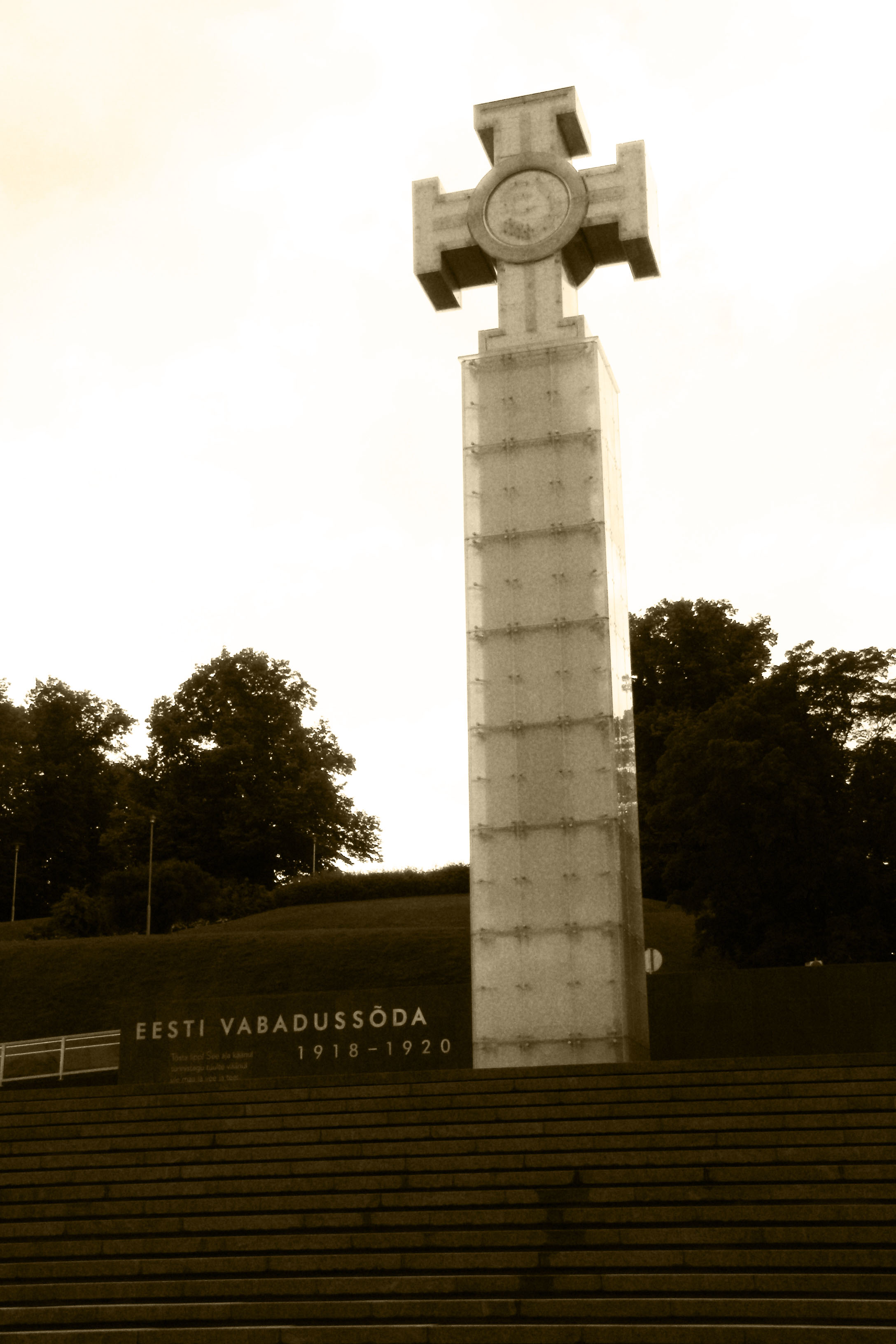

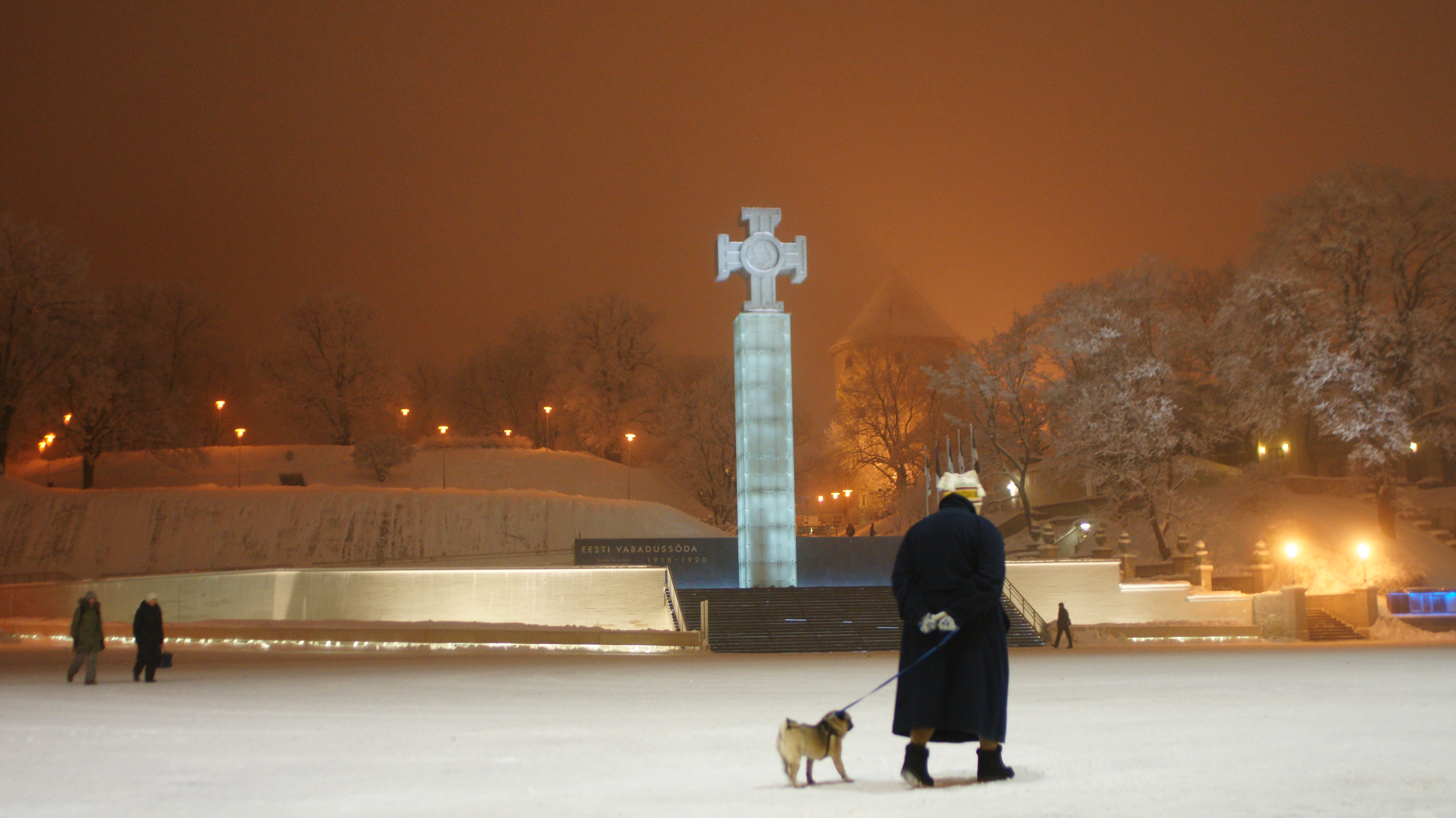

== See also ==
- Cross of Liberty (Estonia)
- Freedom Monument in Riga, Latvia
- Estonian War of Independence
