= Veljo Kaasik =

Estonian architect (born 1938)

Veljo Kaasik (born 17 July 1938 in Tallinn) is an Estonian architect.

He was active architect between 1964 and 1993. He has designed public buildings, apartment houses, flats. Since 1990s, he is the head of architecture and urban planning department of Estonian Academy of Arts.

In 2015, he was awarded with Order of the White Star, IV class.
