= 1971 Estonian Supreme Soviet election =

1971 elections in Estonian SSR

Elections to the Supreme Soviet of the Estonian SSR were held on 13 June 1971. The Bloc of Communists and Non-Party Candidates was the only party able to contest the elections, and won all 183 seats.

== Results ==
Party	Votes	%	Seats
Bloc of Communists and Non-Party Candidates		99.78	183
Against		0.22	–
Total			183
Registered voters/turnout		99.82	
Source: Liivik

== See also ==
- List of members of the Supreme Soviet of the Estonian Soviet Socialist Republic, 1971–1975
