= List of members of the Supreme Soviet of the Estonian Soviet Socialist Republic, 1971–1975 =

This is a list of members of the eighth legislature of the Supreme Soviet of the Estonian Soviet Socialist Republic which was the Estonian Soviet Socialist Republic's legislative chamber between 1940 and 1941, and between 1944 and 1992. The session ran from 13 June 1971 to 15 June 1975, and followed the 1971 Estonian Supreme Soviet election in which only Bloc of Communists and Non-Party Candidates was the only party able to contest the elections.

== List of members ==
Source: Jaan Toomla, Valitud ja Valitsenud: Eesti parlamentaarsete ja muude esinduskogude ning valitsuste isikkoosseis aastail 1917–1999 (National Library of Estonia, 1999), pp. 102–105.

Name	Party	Notes
Evald Äärt		
Robert Adamson	NLKP	
Hendrik Allik	NLKP	
Mihail Ameltšenko	NLKP	
Valter Ani	NLKP	
Aleksander Ansberg	NLKP	Died in office on 20.02.1975
Valve Anton		
Valentina Breh(h)unova	NLKP	
Hiili Burmeister	NLKP	
Elma Dovnar		
Enn Ehala	NLKP	
Ferdinand Eisen	NLKP	
Aleksander Gavrilov		
Arnold Green	NLKP	
Valter Hallmägi	NLKP	
Harald Ilves	NLKP	
Rudolf Isak	NLKP	
Endel Jaanimägi	NLKP	Died in office on 01.03.1974
Meta Jangolenko (Vannas)	NLKP	
Pavel Jerošin	NLKP	
Nikolai Johanson	NLKP	
Mare Juhanson	ÜLKNÜ	
Aino Juhkam	NLKP	
Laine Jäetma	NLKP	
Uno Jürisoo	NLKP	
Ilmar Jürisson	NLKP	
Juhan-Kaspar Jürna	NLKP	
Evald Kaldalu	NLKP	
Osvald Kaldre	NLKP	
Ivar Kallion	NLKP	
Heldor Kann		
Arnold Karu	NLKP	
Lembit Katkosilt		
Vanda Kaunismäe		
Lidia Kaus		
Karl Kimmel	NLKP	
Jannu Kink		
Valter Klauson (Klaussen)	NLKP	
Mihhail Klement	ÜLKNÜ	
Liidia Konopljova		
Vassili Konstantinov	NLKP	
Aleksei Kotov	NLKP	
Aime Kreideberg	-, NLKP	
Vallot Kristal	NLKP	
Meeta Kristel	NLKP	
Vassili Kubarev	NLKP	
Tamara Kudep		
Helga Kurm	NLKP	
Estra Kuudeberg	-, NLKP	
Paul Kuusberg	NLKP	
Elfrida Kuusemäe	NLKP	
Laine-Venaida Kõpper		
Boris Kõrver		
Johannes Käbin	NLKP	
Vladimir Käo	NLKP	
Valve Köster		
Juhan Küla	NLKP	Died in office on 02.08.1972
Lembit Laks		
Tõnis Lasn		
Aleksei Lavrentjev	-, NLKP	
Konstantin Lebedev	NLKP	
Leonid Lentsman	NLKP	
Lehte Leppik		
Endel Lieberg	NLKP	
Boriss Lihhatšov	NLKP	
Pjotr Lih(h)odedov	NLKP	
Marju Liiva	ÜLKNÜ	
Vello-Vambola Liive	NLKP	
Elle Lill	NLKP	
Johannes Lott	NLKP	
Maie Luht		
Eha Lumi	NLKP	
Robert Lätt	NLKP	
Viktor Maamägi	NLKP	
Nadežda Maibach	NLKP	
Hugo Maide	NLKP	
Vladimir Makarov	NLKP	
Jaan Mere	NLKP	
Otto Merimaa	NLKP	
Aleksander Mette	NLKP	
Ivan Molev	NLKP	
Valter Mõttus	NLKP	
Elvi Mõtus		
Kersti Mägi	ÜLKNÜ	
Tiiu Mägi	-, NLKP	
Aasa Mäll		
Aino Nagel	ÜLKNÜ	
Andres Nahk	NLKP	
Georg Nellis	NLKP	
Albert Norak	NLKP	
Voldemar Norden	NLKP	
Tiiu Nurmik	-, NLKP	
Vaike Nutt	NLKP	
Kalev Nõmm	NLKP	
Ülo Nõmm	NLKP	
Oskar Oja	NLKP	
Jaan Ollino	NLKP	
Silvia Pallon	NLKP	
Laine Parvelt		
August Pedajas	NLKP	
Maria Pikkmaa	NLKP	
Juri Polunin	NLKP	
August Pork	NLKP	
Lembit Pukk		
Ääre Purga	NLKP	
Liidia Puulaid	NLKP	
Leili Puusepp	NLKP	
Aksel Põldroo	NLKP	Elected on 16.06.1974
Voldemar Põllus	NLKP	
Heino Pärnamägi		
Eeva Pärtelpoeg	-, NLKP	
Meiner Raag	NLKP	
Enno Rand	NLKP	Died in office on 06.05.1974
Ellen Randoja		
Vello Ranne	NLKP	
Pilvi Reest		
Heino Rohtla	NLKP	
Õie Rööp	NLKP	
Välde Roosmaa	NLKP	
Ludvig Rõõm		
Arnold Rüütel	NLKP	
Nikolai Saaremets	NLKP	Died in office on 07.06.1975
August Saaremägi	NLKP	
Nikolai Serebrjannikov	NLKP	
Ljubov Sergutšova	NLKP	
Dmitri Sevastjanov	NLKP	
Selma Sild	-, NLKP	
Maimu-Maia Sillat	-, NLKP	
Aleksandra Sinjavskaja (Zahharova)	NLKP	
Leida Sipria	NLKP	
Kalju Sõnn		
Virve Sooväli	NLKP	
Ääre Suits	NLKP	
Jakob-Johannes Sune		
Jüri Suurhans	NLKP	
Maie Sülla	-, NLKP	
Lev Šišov	NLKP	
Arvo Taal	NLKP	
Aino Tammeorg	NLKP	
Ellen Tampuu (Koidumaa)	-, NLKP	
Leida Teetsmann	-, NLKP	
Helve Tenner		
Viktor Tenosaar	NLKP	
Jaan Tepandi	NLKP	
Erich Teppe		
Mare Teras		
Rinaldo Thomson	NLKP	
Aime Tihhomirova	ÜLKNÜ	
Ants Tiinas	NLKP	
Vilja Tikk	NLKP	
Kuno Todeson	NLKP	
Aino Toirk	ÜLKNÜ	
Boris Tolbast	NLKP	
Arnold Toome	NLKP	
Indrek Toome	NLKP	Elected on 18.02.1973
Ilmar Tom	NLKP	
Gustav Tõnspoeg	NLKP	
Edgar Tõnurist	NLKP	
Valter Udam	NLKP	
Artur-Bernhard Upsi	NLKP	
Enno Urbel	-, NLKP	
Fjodor Ušanjov	NLKP	
Endel Vaarmets		
Artur Vader	NLKP	
Ilmar Vahe	NLKP	
Herbert Vaher	NLKP	
Viktor Vaht	NLKP	
Linda Vaikmaa		
Karl Vaino	NLKP	
Valter Vaino	NLKP	
Anna Valgepea		
Pjotr Vassikov	NLKP	
Aino Vassiljeva		
Uno Veeperv	NLKP	
Arnold Veimer	NLKP	
Albert Vendelin	NLKP	
Lembit Vihvelin	NLKP	
Jaan Vija	NLKP	
Antonina Vikman	NLKP	
Vello Vilimaa	NLKP	
Helga Viiu		
Juri Vladõtšin	NLKP	
Jevgeni Volkov	NLKP	
Jevgeni Vtorov	NLKP	
Vaino Väljas	NLKP	Elected on 16.06.1974
Kalju Õiglane		
