= Ülo =

Male given name

- Gender: Male
- Language: Estonian

Origin
- Region of origin: Estonia

Ülo is an Estonian masculine given name. The feminine form of Ülo is Ülle.

People named Ülo include:

- Ülo Jaaksoo (born 1939), computer scientist
- Ülo Jõgi (1921–2007), war historian, nationalist and activist
- Ülo Kaasik (1926–2017), mathematician
- Ülo Kaevats (1947–2015), statesman, academic, and philosopher
- Ülo Kesker (1934–2019), draughts player and sports journalist
- Ülo Kiiler (1942–2010), writer and humorist
- Ülo Krigul (born 1978), composer
- Ülo Laanoja (born 1953), politician
- Ülo Langel (born 1951), biochemist
- Ülo Lepik (1921–2022), mathematician and mechanics researcher
- Ülo Lumiste (1929–2017), mathematician
- Ülo Mander (born 1954), ecologist, geographer and educator
- Ülo Matjus (1942–2023), philosopher
- Ülo Mattheus (born 1956), writer and journalist
- Ülo Niinemets (born 1970), plant physiologist and ecophysiologist
- Ülo Nugis (1944–2011), politician and economist
- Ülo Õun (1940–1988), sculptor
- Ülo Peets (born 1944), politician
- Ülo Pikkov (born 1976), animator, film director and producer
- Ülo Raudmäe (1923–1990), conductor, composer and trombonist
- Ülo Seppa (1933–2015), lawyer and agronomist
- Ülo Sooster (1924–1970), painter
- Ülo Tärno (born 1936), politician
- Ülo Tedre (1928–2015), folklorist
- Ülo Tootsen (1933–2006), journalist and politician
- Ülo Torpats (1920–1988), philologist and translator
- Ülo Tulik (1957–2022), politician
- Ülo Tuulik (born 1940), writer
- Ülo Uluots (1930–1997), politician, mining engineer and military historian
- Ülo Varul (1952– 2016), basketball player
- Ülo Vilimaa (1941–2021), dancer, choreographer, theatre director and painter
- Ülo Vinter (1924–2000), composer
- Ülo Voitka (born 1968), freedom fighter, forest brother, and pro-anarchist
- Ülo Vooglaid (born 1935), social scientist and politician
