= Erik Norkroos =

Estonian cinematographer and director

Erik Norkroos (born 1 October 1969 in Tallinn) is an Estonian cinematographer, producer, editor and director.

Between 1993 and 1997 studied cinematography (master Arvo Iho) at the Tallinn Pedagogical Institute nowadays known as Baltic Film and Media School, Tallinn University.

Producing documentaries at Rühm Pluss Null/Missing Pictures and Umberto Productions.

== Filmography ==
=== Cinematographer ===
- Aknavaade / My Window, 2026
- Leek läidab luule / The Flame Ignites Poetry, 2025
- Extempore. Vabanedes teadvuse tegevusest / Freeing the Mind (director Heli Reimann, Erik Norkroos), 2023
- Neeme Järvi. Muusika üle kõige / Neeme Järvi. Only Music Matters (director Erik Norkroos), 2023
- Neeme Järvi. Tõeline kapellmeister / Neeme Järvi. A True Kapellmeister (director Erik Norkroos), 2023
- Võrdlev anatoomia / Comparative Anatomy (director Kristina Norman), 2022
- Orhideliirium (Pelgupaik. Rip-off. Janu) / Orchidelirium (Shelter. Rip-off. Thirst) (director Kristina Norman), 2022
- Randvere Leonardo (director Kerttu Soans), 2022
- Kasuemad / Foster Mothers (director Meelis Muhu), 2021
- Suurem kui sport / Bigger Than Sports (director Kerttu Soans), 2019
- Mees muinasjutust / A Man From A Fairytale (director Ruti Murusalu), 2019
- Risti aarded / Risti Treasures (director Ruti Murusalu), 2019
- Vello Salo. Igapäevaelu müstika / Vello Salo. Everyday mysticism (director Jaan Tootsen), 2018
- Ahto. Unistuste jaht / Ahto. Chasing a Dream (director Jaanis Valk), 2018
- Mõned tähelepanekud armastuse kohta / Some Notes About Love (director Maris Kerge), 2018
- Pagulasega elutoas / At Home With Refugees (director Kristina Norman), 2017
- Ühe unistuse maja / House Of A Dream (director Ruti Murusalu), 2016
- Hingemaa / Land Of Soul - Director's Cut (director Erik Norkroos, Kullar Viimne), 2016
- Täna mängime sõda / Today We Play War (director Meelis Muhu), 2016
- Hingemaa / Land Of Soul (director Erik Norkroos, Kullar Viimne), 2016
- Elizabeth'i mänguväljak / Elizabeth's Playground (director Maris Kerge, Erik Norkroos), 2015
- Englas. Vana soldat / Englas. Old Warrior (director Peeter Simm), 2015
- Puhta mõtte ruum / Space Of Pure Thought (director Puu Estonia), 2015
- Ballettmeister / Ballet Master (director Ruti Murusalu), 2014
- Musta mere pärlid / Pearls Of The Black Sea (director Erik Norkroos), 2014
- Ühisel pinnal / Common Ground (director Kristina Norman), 2013
- Üks palav suvepäev / One Hot Summer Day (director Erik Norkroos), 2013
- Velosoofid / Velosophy (director Jaan Tootsen), 2013
- Veregrupp / Blood Type (director Leeni Linna), 2013
- Sinine Kõrb / Ballerina Blues (director Ruti Murusalu), 2012
- Jahis ainult naised / Only For Women (director Kullar Viimne), 2012
- Sünnipäev / Birthday (director Erik Norkroos), 2011–2012
- Et meeldiks kõigile / A Monument To Please Everyone (director Kristina Norman), 2011
- Päikeselill / Flower Of the Sun (director Jaanis Valk), 2011
- Regilaul - laulud õhust / Regilaul - Lieder Aus Der Luft / Regilaul - Songs Of The Ancient Sea (director Ulrik Koch), 2011
- Roots - sada aastat sõda / Roots - One Hundred Years Of War And Music (director Katrin Laur), 2011
- Uus maailm / New World (director Jaan Tootsen), 2011
- Püha tuli / Holy Fire (director Erik Norkroos), 2010
- Kihnu pulm / Kihnu Wedding (director Meelis Muhu), 2009
- Kihnu kosjad / Kihnu Wooing (director Meelis Muhu), 2009
- Palusalu (director Kristina Davidjants), 2009
- Teisel pool teed / From Side To Side (director Jaanis Valk), 2009
- Ultra Vennikased / No Finish Line (director Kullar Viimne), 2009
- Aja meistrid / The Kings Of The Time (director Mait Laas), 2008
- Aljoša / Alyosha (director Meelis Muhu), 2008
- Professionaalne amatöör / Professional amateur (director Indrek Kangro), 2008
- 24/1 ehk alla 7-aastastele keelatud (director Kerttu Soans-Tammisto), 2007
- Apteeker / Pharmacist (director Jaanis Valk), 2007
- Ihust ja hingest / From Body And Soul (director Indrek Kangro), 2007
- Öö / Night (director Jaanis Valk), 2007
- Pronksiöö: Vene mäss Tallinnas (director Urmas E. Liiv), 2007
- Hea uus ilm / Brave New World (director Jaan Tootsen), 2006
- Udmurtiast armastusega (director Õnne Luha), 2006
- Avasta rikas nurgatagune kosmoses (director Jaan Tootsen), 2005
- Kahe näoga saar (director Kerttu Soans-Tammisto), 2005
- Kursi koolkond (director Rein Maran), 2005
- Parma elu nimel / For Better Life (director Märt Sildvee), 2005
- Südame kutse: Inna Taarna (director Jaanis Valk), 2005
- Bussi juures (director Meelis Muhu), 2005
- ID (director Meeme Kerge), 2005
- Kinobuss - kino koju kätte (director Mikk Rand), 2004
- Osta elevant ära / Buy An Elephant, 2004
- Teistmoodi tihane / Another Titmouse (director Mart Taevere), 2004
- Meeleavaldaja / Opinionator (director Meelis Muhu), 2003
- Erki Kasemets (director Meelis Salujärv), 2002
- Isamaa ilu / Beauty Of Motherland (director Jaak Kilmi, Andres Maimik), 2001
- Kalamaja - puitlinna võimalus (director Marko Raat), 2001
- Päkapikudisko / Elf Disco (director Jaak Kilmi, Andres Maimik), 2001
- Inimeste lemmik / The Philosopher (director Meelis Piller), 2000
- Maire Männik, 54 rue du Montparnasse (director Rein Maran), 2000
- Suur õde / Big Sister (director Jaak Kilmi, Andres Maimik), 2000
- Töö / Work (director Rainer Sarnet), 2000
- Eesti posti lugu (director Aare Tilk), 1998
- Koera surm (director Urmas E.Liiv), 1998
- Õppija õigus (director Jaak Kilmi, Andres Maimik), 1998
- Inglid kaasa (director Märt Sildvee), 1997
- Ma armastan sind (director Peeter Herzog), 1996
- McCulloc (director Marko Raat), 1995
- Üksindus tema näo järgi (director Meelis Salujärv), 1995
- Vari seinal (director Rainer Sarnet), 1994
- Mielikuva / Mental Image (director Teppo Räisanen), 1994
- Merehaigus (director Rainer Sarnet), 1993
- Luuletus (director Meelis Salujärv), 1991
- Kell (director Erik Norkroos), 1988

=== Producer ===
- Un Photographe À Cannes (director Kullar Viimne), 2026
- Aknavaade / My Window (co-director Maris Kerge), 2026
- Päevapiltnik / Lensman (director Kullar Viimne), 2026
- Torn / Torn (director Kullar Viimne), 2024
- Hungerburg: inimesed / Hungerburg: people (director Maria Reinup), 2024
- Extempore. Vabanedes teadvuse tegevusest / Freeing the Mind (director Heli Reimann, Erik Norkroos), 2023
- Neeme Järvi. Muusika üle kõige / Neeme Järvi. Only Music Matters (director Erik Norkroos), 2023
- Põrgu katlakütja / Hell's Stoker (director Kullar Viimne), 2023
- Neeme Järvi. Tõeline kapellmeister / Neeme Järvi. A True Kapellmeister (director Erik Norkroos), 2023
- Orhideliirium (Pelgupaik. Rip-off. Janu) / Orchidelirium (Shelter. Rip-off. Thirst) (director Kristina Norman), 2022
- Hobujõud / Horsepower (director Kullar Viimne), 2022
- Randvere Leonardo (director Kerttu Soans), 2022
- Pärand. Anu Raud / The Heritage (director Erle Veber), 2021
- Kasuemad / Foster Mothers (director Meelis Muhu), 2021
- Suurem kui sport / Bigger Than Sports (director Kerttu Soans), 2019
- Mees muinasjutust / A Man From A Fairytale (director Ruti Murusalu), 2019
- Risti aarded / Risti Treasures (director Ruti Murusalu), 2019
- Ahto. Unistuste jaht / Ahto. Chasing a Dream (director Jaanis Valk), 2018
- Jagatud valgus / Shards Of Light (director Kullar Viimne), 2018
- Pagulasega elutoas / At Home With Refugees (director Kristina Norman), 2017
- Ühe unistuse maja / House Of A Dream (director Ruti Murusalu), 2016
- Hingemaa / Land Of Soul - Director's Cut (director Erik Norkroos, Kullar Viimne), 2016
- Hingemaa / Land Of Soul (director Erik Norkroos, Kullar Viimne), 2016
- Elizabeth'i mänguväljak / Elizabeth's Playground (director Maris Kerge, Erik Norkroos), 2015
- Englas. Vana soldat / Englas. Old Warrior (director Peeter Simm), 2015
- Puhta mõtte ruum / Space Of Pure Thought (director Puu Estonia), 2015
- Ballettmeister / Ballet Master (director Ruti Murusalu), 2014
- Kuidas ma Aafrikat päästsin / How I Saved Africa (director Kullar Viimne), 2014
- Musta mere pärlid / Pearls Of The Black Sea (director Erik Norkroos), 2014
- Üks palav suvepäev / One Hot Summer Day (director Erik Norkroos), 2013
- Veregrupp / Blood Type (director Leeni Linna), 2013
- Sinine Kõrb / Ballerina Blues (director Ruti Murusalu), 2012
- Jahis ainult naised / Only For Women (director Kullar Viimne), 2012
- Sünnipäev / Birthday (director Erik Norkroos), 2011–2012
- Et meeldiks kõigile / A Monument To Please Everyone (director Kristina Norman), 2011
- Hing / Breath (director Kullar Viimne), 2011
- Päikeselill / Flower Of the Sun (director Jaanis Valk), 2011
- Regilaul - laulud õhust / Regilaul - Lieder Aus Der Luft / Regilaul - Songs Of The Ancient Sea (director Ulrik Koch), 2011
- Püha tuli / Holy Fire (director Erik Norkroos), 2010
- Kihnu pulm / Kihnu Wedding (director Meelis Muhu), 2009
- Kihnu kosjad / Kihnu Wooing (director Meelis Muhu), 2009
- Palusalu (director Kristina Davidjants), 2009
- Teisel pool teed / From Side To Side (director Jaanis Valk), 2009
- Ultra Vennikased / No Finish Line (director Kullar Viimne), 2009
- Professionaalne amatöör / Professional amateur (director Indrek Kangro), 2008
- 24/1 ehk alla 7-aastastele keelatud (director Kerttu Soans-Tammisto), 2007
- Apteeker / Pharmacist (director Jaanis Valk), 2007
- Ihust ja hingest / From Body And Soul (director Indrek Kangro), 2007
- Öö / Night (director Jaanis Valk), 2007
- Hea uus ilm / Brave New World (director Jaan Tootsen), 2006
- Udmurtiast armastusega (director Õnne Luha), 2006
- Avasta rikas nurgatagune kosmoses (director Jaan Tootsen), 2005
- Kahe näoga saar (director Kerttu Soans-Tammisto), 2005
- Parema elu nimel / For Better Life (director Märt Sildvee), 2005
- Südame kutse: Inna Taarna (director Jaanis Valk), 2005
- Bussi juures (director Meelis Muhu), 2005
- ID (director Meeme Kerge), 2005
- Jumalaga / Godspeed (director Kullar Viimne), 2004
- Osta elevant ära / Buy An Elephant, 2004
- Teistmoodi tihane / Another Titmouse (director Mart Taevere), 2004
- Erki Kasemets (director Meelis Salujärv), 2002
- Ballada (director Märt Sildvee), 2001
- Raudroosiõied / Iron Rose Blossoms (director Karol Ansip), 2001
- Kalamaja - puitlinna võimalus (director Marko Raat), 2001
- Päkapikudisko / Elf Disco (director Jaak Kilmi, Andres Maimik), 2001
- Õine navigatsioon / Night Navigation (director Marko Raat), 1998
- Õppija õigus (director Jaak Kilmi, Andres Maimik), 1998
- Üksindus tema näo järgi (director Meelis Salujärv), 1995
- Luuletus (director Meelis Salujärv), 1991
- Kell (director Erik Norkroos), 1988

=== Director ===
- Aknavaade / My Window (co-director Maris Kerge), 2026
- Leek läidab luule / The Flame Ignites Poetry, 2025
- Extempore. Vabanedes teadvuse tegevusest / Freeing the Mind (director Heli Reimann, Erik Norkroos), 2023
- Neeme Järvi. Muusika üle kõige / Neeme Järvi. Only Music Matters, 2023
- Põrgu katlakütja / Hell's Stoker (director Kullar Viimne, co-author Erik Norkroos), 2023
- Neeme Järvi. Tõeline kapellmeister / Neeme Järvi. A True Kapellmeister, 2023
- Hingemaa / Land Of Soul - Director's Cut (co-director Kullar Viimne), 2016
- Hingemaa / Land Of Soul (co-director Kullar Viimne), 2016
- Elizabeth'i mänguväljak / Elizabeth's Playground (co-director Maris Kerge), 2015
- Musta mere pärlid / Pearls Of The Black Sea, 2014
- Üks palav suvepäev / One Hot Summer Day, 2013
- Sünnipäev / Birthday, 2011–2012
- Püha tuli / Holy Fire, 2010

=== Editor ===
- Aknavaade / My Window (co-director Maris Kerge), 2026
- Un Photographe À Cannes (director Kullar Viimne), 2026
- Päevapiltnik / Lensman (director Kullar Viimne), 2026
- Leek läidab luule / The Flame Ignites Poetry, 2025
- Torn / Torn (director Kullar Viimne), 2024
- Extempore. Vabanedes teadvuse tegevusest / Freeing the Mind (director Heli Reimann, Erik Norkroos), 2023
- Neeme Järvi. Muusika üle kõige / Neeme Järvi. Only Music Matters (director Erik Norkroos), 2023
- Põrgu katlakütja / Hell's Stoker (director Kullar Viimne), 2023
- Neeme Järvi. Tõeline kapellmeister / Neeme Järvi. A True Kapellmeister (director Erik Norkroos), 2023
- Orhideliirium (Pelgupaik. Rip-off. Janu) / Orchidelirium (Shelter. Rip-off. Thirst) (director Kristina Norman), 2022
- Hobujõud / Horsepower (director Kullar Viimne), 2022
- Suurem kui sport / Bigger Than Sports (director Kerttu Soans), 2019
- Mees muinasjutust / A Man From A Fairytale (director Ruti Murusalu), 2019
- Risti aarded / Risti Treasures (director Ruti Murusalu), 2019
- Ahto. Unistuste jaht / Ahto. Chasing a Dream (director Jaanis Valk), 2018
- Jagatud valgus / Shards Of Light (director Kullar Viimne), 2018
- Pagulasega elutoas / At Home With Refugees (director Kristina Norman), 2017
- Ühe unistuse maja / House Of A Dream (director Ruti Murusalu), 2016
- Hingemaa / Land Of Soul - Director's Cut (co-director Kullar Viimne), 2016
- Hingemaa / Land Of Soul (co-director Kullar Viimne), 2016
- Elizabeth'i mänguväljak / Elizabeth's Playground (co-director Maris Kerge), 2015
- Englas. Vana soldat / Englas. Old Warrior (director Peeter Simm), 2015
- Musta mere pärlid / Pearls Of The Black Sea, 2014
- Üks palav suvepäev / One Hot Summer Day, 2013
- Sinine Kõrb / Ballerina Blues (director Ruti Murusalu), 2012
- Sünnipäev / Birthday, 2011–2012
- Et meeldiks kõigile / A Monument To Please Everyone (director Kristina Norman), 2011
- Püha tuli / Holy Fire, 2010
- Palusalu (director Kristina Davidjants), 2009
- Vabadus algab seest / Freedom Starts From Within, 2009
