= Tootsen =

Tootsen is an Estonian surname. Notable people with the surname include:

- Jaan Tootsen (born 1975), Estonian film director, producer and journalist
- Toivo Tootsen (born 1943), Estonian politician and writer
- Tõnis Tootsen (born 1988), Estonian writer
- Ülo Tootsen (1933–2006), Estonian journalist and politician
