= Rein Ahas =

Estonian geographer (1966–2018)

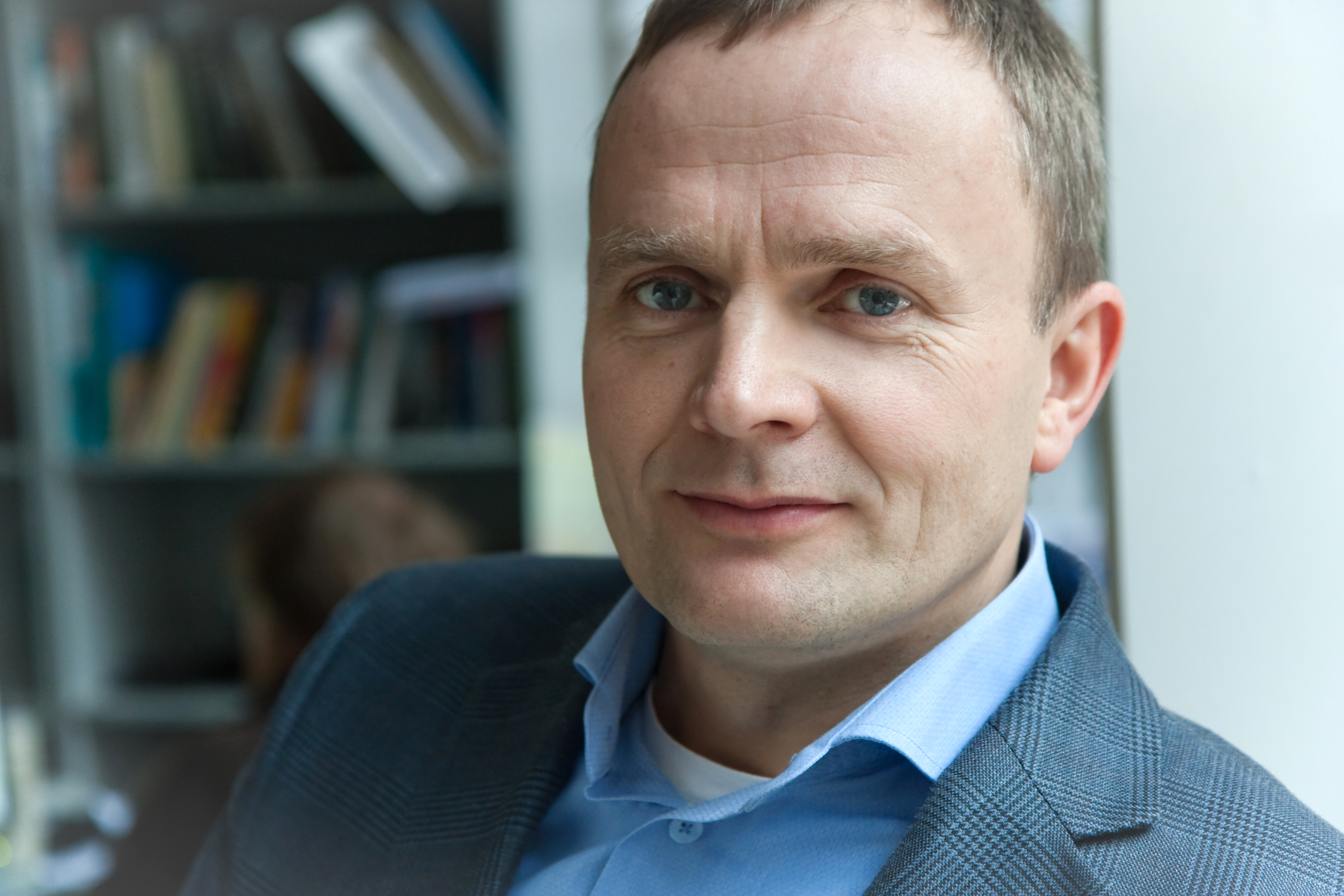
Rein Ahas in 2013

Rein Ahas (10 December 1966 – 18 February 2018) was an Estonian geographer and a professor at the University of Tartu. From 2013–2015 he was a researcher-professor of the Estonian Academy of Sciences.

== Education ==
In 1991 he received his undergraduate degree in Physical Geography and Nature Conservation from the University of Tartu, in 1994 he completed his MSc and in 1999 his PhD, with the thesis "Spatial and Temporal Variability of Phenological Phases in Estonia", supervised by Prof. Ülo Mander and Jaan Eilart.

== Research ==
His research topics included spatial mobility of people, travel, urban geography and segregation, with special interest on using and developing mobile positioning based methods. Previous research included the impact of climate change, environmental impact and seasonality.

Scientific activities focus to Mobility Lab of University of Tartu.

He was the co-founder and co-owner of spin-off company Positium LBS.

== Death ==
On 18 February 2018, Ahas collapsed while competing in the Tartu Ski Marathon. He was resuscitated by fellow skiers and taken to the University of Tartu Hospital, where he died of what was determined to be a heart attack, aged 51.

== Publications ==
Top 5 cited publications in Google Scholar

- Ahas, R. 1999. Long-term phyto-, ornitho- and ichthyophenological time-series analyses in Estonia. Int. J. Biometeorology, 42, pp. 119–123.
- Ahas, R., Aasa, A., Menzel, A., Fedotova, V.G., Scheifinger, H. 2002. Changes in European spring phenology. Int. J. Climatology, 22, pp. 1727–1738.
- Ahas, R., Ü. M. 2005. Location based services—new challenges for planning and public administration?. Futures, 37, pp. 547–561.
- Menzel, A., Sparks, T., Estrella, N., Koch, E., Aasa, A., Ahas, R., Alm-Kübler K., et al. 2006. European phenological response to climate change matches the warming pattern. Global Change Biology, 12: pp. 1969–1976.
- Schwartz, MD, Ahas, R., Aasa, A. 2006. Onset of Spring Starting Earlier Across the Northern Hemisphere. Global Change Biology. 12(2): pp. 343–351.
