= Raudmäe =

Raudmäe is an Estonian surname, meaning "iron hill". Notable people with the surname include:

- Ülo Raudmäe (1923–1990), Estonian conductor and composer
- Urve Raudmäe-Tauts (born 1935), Estonian opera singer
