= Kaire Vilgats =

Estonian vocalist and actress

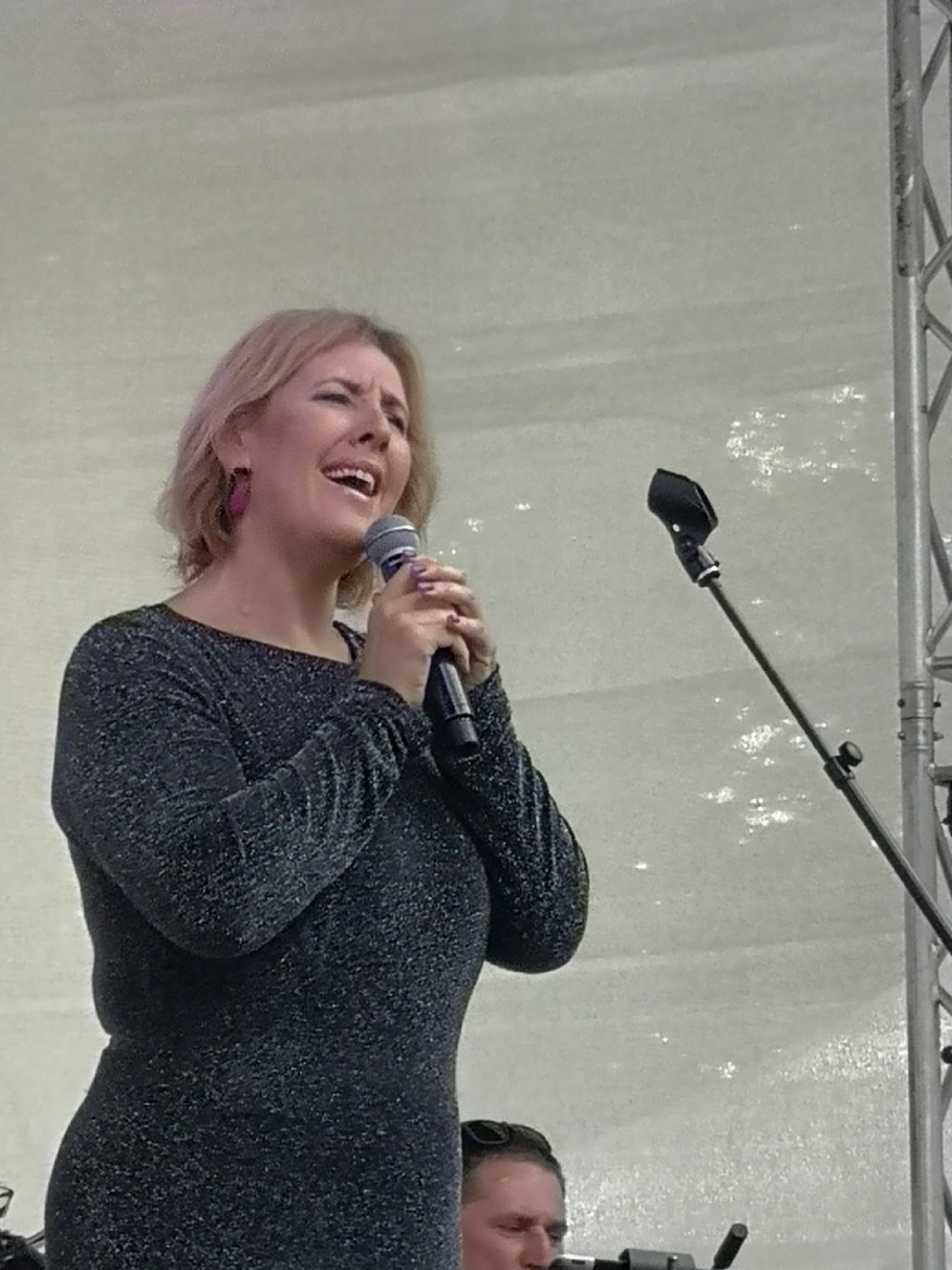

Background information
- Born: 11 January 1976 (age 50); Pärnu, then part of Estonian SSR, Soviet Union
- Genres: Pop; jazz
- Occupations: Singer, actress

Kaire Vilgats (born 11 January 1976) is an Estonian vocalist and actress, known for numerous roles in stage musicals. Over the years, she has repeatedly participated in the Eurovision Song Contest as a backing vocalist for Estonian entries.

== Early life ==
Kaire Vilgats was born and spent her childhood in Pärnu, a resort town in the south-west of Estonia, where she also went to school. She learnt the accordion in a music school before taking classes in singing.

== Career ==
Vilgats has later been trained in pop-jazz singing at the Georg Ots Music School in Tallinn, with Silvi Vrait as her vocal coach.

In 1999, Vilgats was awarded third place in the Kaks takti ette contest for young singers, organized by Estonian Television. The winner of that season was an Estonian rock star, Tanel Padar, with Eda-Ines Etti in second position. The same year, she was cast in the company of the Estonian production of the musical La Cage aux Folles which was her theatre début. A series of supporting roles in musicals were to follow.

Kaire Vilgats has been the musical director of the Estonian Puppet Theatre in Tallinn, where she composed music for children's musicals and plays, like, The Little Witch by Otfried Preußler.

In 2006, she was nominated for an Estonian theatre prize for the supporting role of Amps in the musical Romeo & Julia but did not win.

=== Roles ===
- 2000: Tanz der Vampire (Magda)
- 2000: Little Shop of Horrors (Crystal)
- 2000: Zorba (Storyteller)
- 2001: No, No, Nanette (Betty from Boston)
- 2001: Les Misérables (Mme Thenardier, understudy)
- 2002: Miss Saigon (Gigi)
- 2003: Fiddler on the Roof (Golde)
- 2004: Crazy for You (Irene Roth)
- 2006: Fame (Esther Sherman)
- 2006: Romeo & Julia (Amps)
- 2006: Lumekuninganna (Snow Queen) (Grandmother/Snow Queen)
- 2007: Phantom (Carlotta)
- 2008: Anything Goes (Reno Sweeney)
- 2008: Buratino senitundmatud seiklused ("Buratino`s Yet Unknown Adventures") (Malviina)
- 2011: Libahunt ("The Warewolf") (Grandmother)
- 2011: The Beauty and the Beast (Teapot)
- 2011: Karlsson katuselt ("Karlsson on the Roof") (Hildur Sokk), drama
- 2012: Seljatas sada meest ("Overcame a Hundred Men") (Maria Loorberg), drama
- 2013: Shrek (Dragon)
- 2014: Koerhaldjas Mia (Dog-Fairy Mia) (Christmas Mom)
- 2015: Billy Elliiot (Mrs Wilkinson)
- 2015: Karlsson katuselt ("Karlsson on the Roof"), (Hildur Sokk)
- 2016: Mamma Mia (Rosie Mulligan / Tanya Chesham-Leigh)
- 2017: Les Misérables (Mme Thenardier)
- 2026: Romeo & Julia (Amps)

As a chorist, Vilgats has appeared in Evita, La Cage aux Folles, Georg and Mort. She is also a voice actress and vocal coach.

== Other credits ==
Kaire Vilgats is a backing vocalist for various Estonian pop acts such as Anne Veski, Ivo Linna or Maarja.

With 7 appearances, she holds the record for highest number of participations in the Eurovision Song Contest for Estonia. In 2000 and 2002, she sang backing vocals for the Estonian and Maltese songs, and did the same for Estonia at the 2014, 2016, 2017, 2019 and 2026 contests. She was also due to attend the canceled 2020 contest in Rotterdam as a backing singer.

Vilgats provided her vocals for the album Family. We are Family, released in 2003 as a cooperative effort of several popular vocalists, such as Nele-Liis Vaiksoo and Lauri Pihlap. She has also performed with the Estonian Police Orchestra and a number of other orchestras and groups.

Kaire Vilgats has been open about her weight problems and has therefore given patronage to sporting events, like Tartu Maraton in which she successfully participates. She has co-hosted and participated in TV-shows, Your Face Sounds Familiar among many.

In 2021, she had a small role in the Ergo Kuld directed comedy film Jahihooaeg. In 2023, she appeared as Sohvia in the Kuld directed feature film comedy Suvitajad.

== Personal life ==
Vilgats is a mother of three children - two sons and a daughter. She is divorced from a music producer Johannes Lõhmus.

Vilgats' mother is Ester Vilgats, a news journalist for Estonian Public Broadcasting.
