= Varul =

Varul is an Estonian surname. Notable people with the surname include:

- Paul Varul (born 1952), Estonian lawyer and politician
- Ülo Varul (1952–2016), Estonian basketball player

== See also ==
- Varul River, river in Romania
