= Aino Õige =

Estonian botanist (1935–2018)

- Born: June 29, 1935; Jutapere, Estonia
- Died: July 17, 2018 (aged 83); Tallinn, Estonia
- Occupation: Botanist

Aino Õige, also known as Aino Somann-Õige (née Aino Sooman, June 29, 1935 – July 17, 2018) was an Estonian botanist and popularizer of nature.

== Early life and education ==
Aino Õige was born at the Abema farm in Jutapere (since 1977 part of the village of Pajaka) to the farmer Hugo Sooman (1909–1952) and his wife Kristiine Sooman (née Tarkmeel, 1911–1995). In 1960, she graduated from the Faculty of Biology at the University of Tartu, majoring in botany, with the thesis Andmeid kaasikute alustaimestikust ja ökoloogilistest tingimustest Eesti NSV-s (Data on the Understory Vegetation and Ecological Conditions of Birch Groves in the Estonian SSR).

== Career ==
From 1960 to 1964, Õige was the manager of the Viidumäe Nature Reserve. She then worked in Tallinn as a methodologist at the Center for Young Naturalists of the Estonian SSR (later called the Center for Young Nature Lovers), prepared teaching materials for nature conservation, and supervised the botany circle there. She was the head of the Tallinn Nature Conservation Inspectorate.

== Family ==
Aino Ōige was married to Sulev Ōige (born 1937), and she had three children. Ōige died as a result of leukemia in 2018.

== Bibliography ==
- 1960: Andmeid kaasikute alustaimestikust ja ökoloogilistest tingimustest Eesti NSV-s (Data on the Understory Vegetation and Ecological Conditions of Birch Groves in the Estonian SSR). Thesis, University of Tartu
- 1963: Viidumägi – haruldaste taimede kodu (Viidumägi: Home of Rare Plants). Coauthor with Jaan Eilart. Tallinn: Eesti Riiklik Kirjastus
