= Ulo =

Ulo, ULO or Ülo may refer to:

- Ülo, Estonian masculine given name
- Ulaangom Airport IATA code
- Ulo, a brand name of the medication Clofedanol

== See also ==
- Ulos, traditional fabric of the Batak people of North Sumatra in Indonesia
