= Vaiksoo =

Family name

Vaiksoo is an Estonian language surname and may refer to:

- Jaanus Vaiksoo (born 1967), Estonian children's writer, literary scholar, teacher and translator
- Nele-Liis Vaiksoo (born 1984), Estonian singer and actress
