= List of Estonian plays =

This is a list of Estonian-language plays. It is currently incomplete.

| Name | Name in English | Author(s) | Premier (year, location) | Further info |
|---|---|---|---|---|
| Buratino senitundmatud seiklused | | | | |
| Enne kukke ja koitu | Before Cock's Crow at Dawn | August Kitzberg | | |
| Olen kolmeteistkümne aastane | I Am 13 | | | |
| Pruutide kool | | Gerda Kordemets, Margit Keerdo | | |
| Saaremaa onupoeg | | Lydia Koidula | | |
| Seljatas sada meest | | Andres Ehin, director: Kaili Viidas | | |
| Tabamata ime | | Eduard Vilde | | |
| Tallinna legendid | Tallinn Legends | | | |
| Rahamaa | Business As Usual | Mehis Pihla | 2024, Tartu Comb Factory | Was part of Tartu 2024 main programme |
| Öökuninganna | Queen of the Night | Piret Jaaks | 2015 | |
| Orgia | An Orgy | Livia Ulman and Andris Feldmanis | | |
| Viimane Liivlane | The Last Livonian | Paavo Piik | | |

== See also ==
- List of Estonian musicals
