= Pala, Järva County =

Village in Estonia

Coordinates: 58°51′N 25°25′E

Pala
- Village
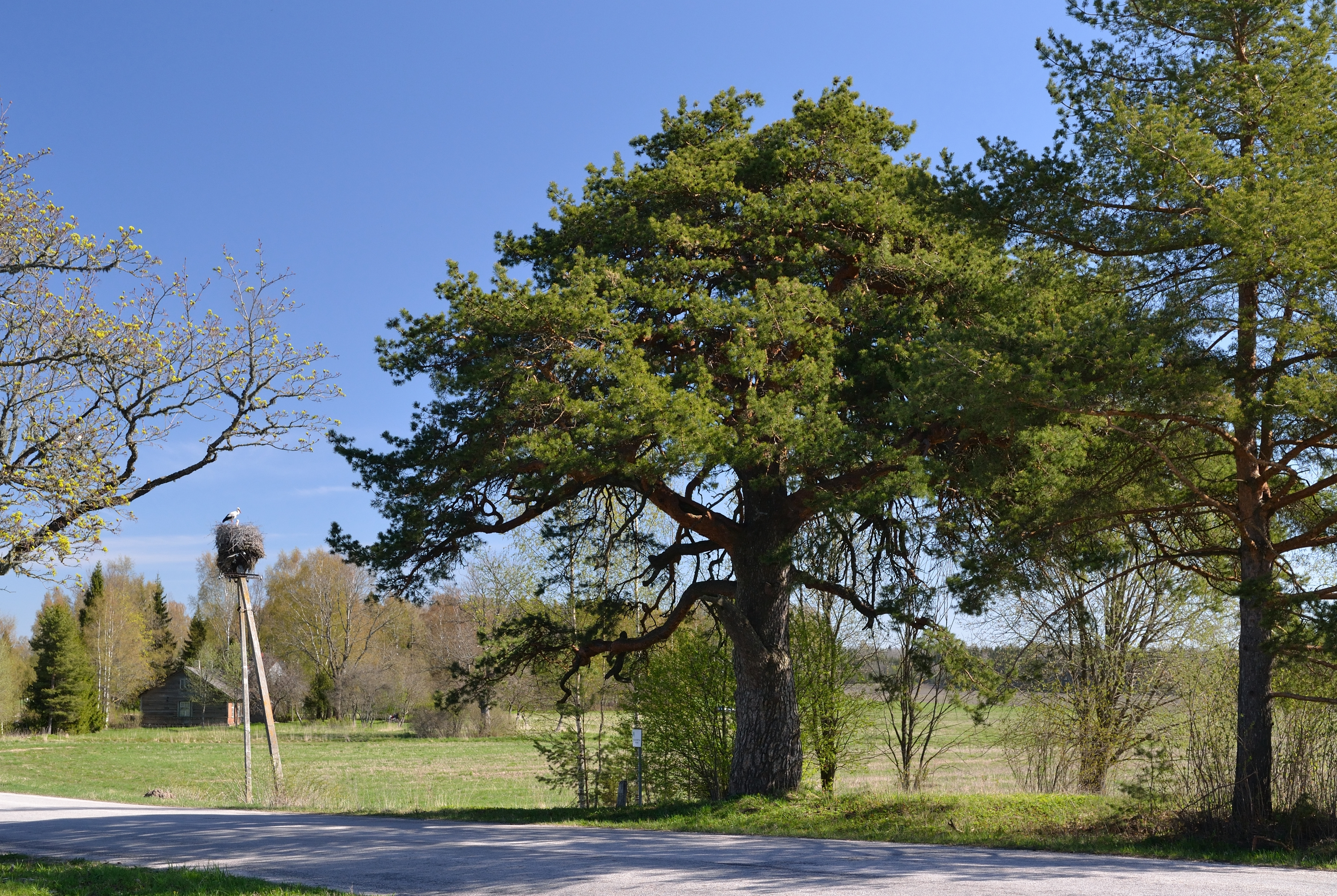
- Raudmetsa pine in the village
- Interactive map of Pala
- Country: Estonia
- County: Järva County
- Parish: Türi Parish
- Time zone: UTC+2 (EET)
  - Summer (DST): UTC+3 (EEST)

Pala is a village in Türi Parish, Järva County in central Estonia.

The biologist and conservationist Jaan Eilart (1933–2006) was born in Pala.
