= Tõnis Tootsen =

Tõnis Tootsen (born 17 October 1988) is an Estonian poet, prose writer and novelist. He mainly writes in the genres of science fiction and fantasy.

Tõnis Tootsen was born in Tallinn. His father is journalist, writer and politician Toivo Tootsen and his mother is journalist Reet Tõllasepp. He has one sister and his half-brother is journalist and documentary filmmaker Jaan Tootsen from his father's previous marriage. His uncle was television journalist and politician Ülo Tootsen. Tootsen attended schools in Tallinn and studied semiotics at the University of Tartu.

His debut novel Esimene päev (The First Day) was published in 2016 and received the Estonian Literature Endowment Annual Award. His 2022 novel Ahvide pasteet. Ühe ahvi mälestusi ja mõtteid (Pâté of the Apes: One Primate’s Thoughts and Memories) was nominated for the 2023 European Union Prize for Literature and garnered a special mention.

His books include:

- Nukumeister (The Puppet Master, short stories, 2012)
- Esimene Päev (The First Day, novel, 2016)
- Uttu (Into the Fog, poetry, 2021)
- Ahvide pasteet. Ühe ahvi mälestusi ja mõtteid (Pâté of the Apes: One Primate’s Thoughts and Memories, novel, 2022)
