= Ülo Vinter =

Estonian composer

Ülo Vinter (3 January 1924 in Tallinn – 2 July 2000 in Käsmu) was an Estonian composer.

In 1951, he graduated from Tallinn Music High School in music theory. Afterwards, he graduated from Tallinn State Conservatory in composition specialty.

From 1956 to 1969 he was the music editor at Estonian Radio and from 1969 to 1986 at Eesti Telefilm.

He has created music for several Estonian cult films, including Mehed ei nuta ('Men Don't Cry') (1968), A Young Retiree (1972) and Here We Are! (1979).

Since 1958 he was a member of Estonian Composers' Union.

== Works ==
- 1969: children’s musical "Pippi Longstocking" (co-author Ülo Raudmäe)
- orchestral suite "Paunvere"
- Paunvere (Süit Sümfooniaorkestrile) (10"), 1968
- Väiksed Nipid (LP), 1986
