= Tallinn University of Applied Sciences =

Vocational university in Tallinn

TTK University of Applied Sciences
- Tallinna Tehnikakõrgkool
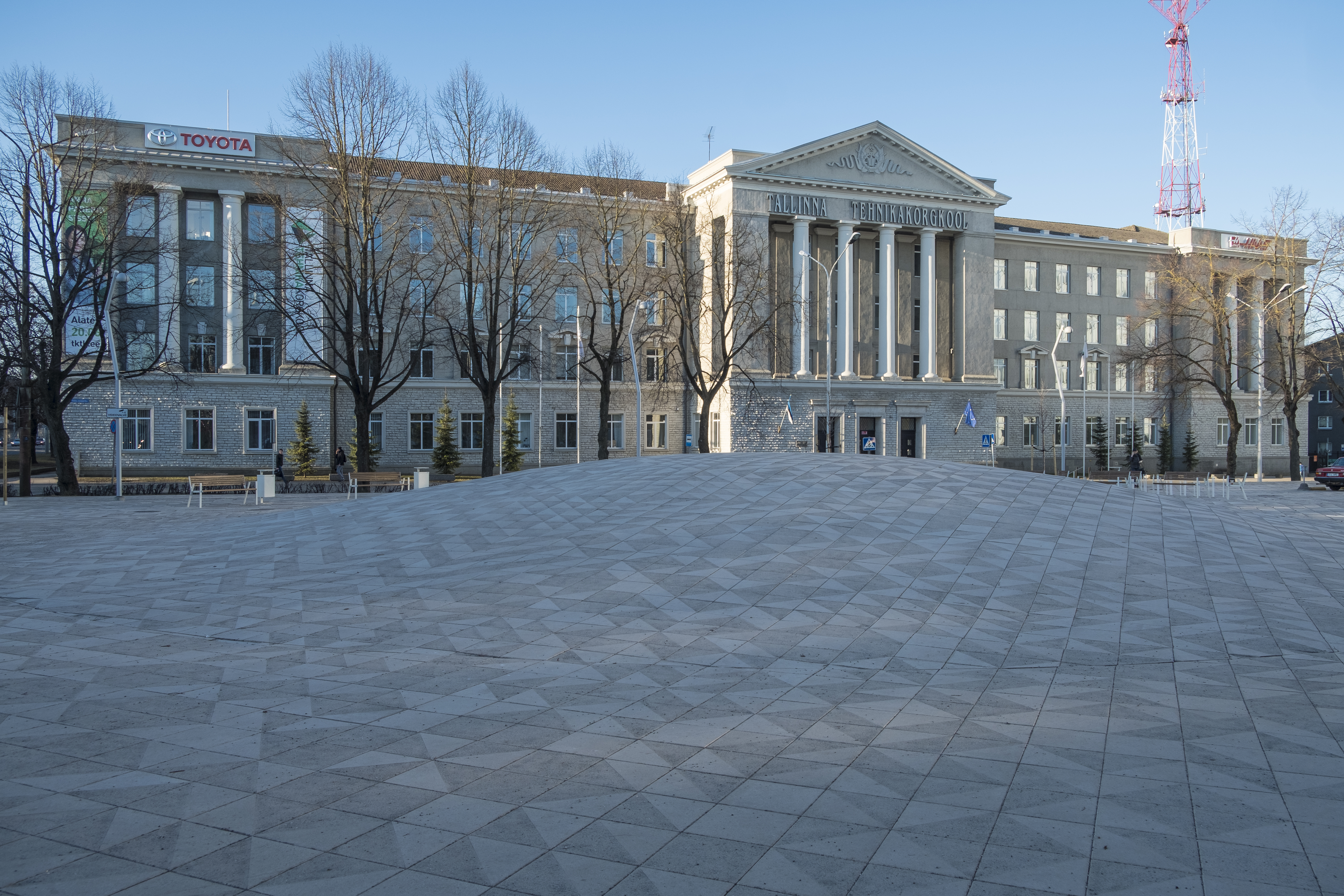
- TTK University of Applied Sciences building in Uus Maailm
- Motto: Usus Est Magister Optimus
- Type: Public
- Established: 1915; 111 years ago
- Rector: Martti Kiisa
- Students: 2234 (2017)
- Location: Tallinn, Estonia; 59°25′35.38″N 24°44′29.34″E
- Website: tktk.ee

TTK University of Applied Sciences (Estonian: Tallinna Tehnikakõrgkool; TTK) is a higher education institution in Tallinn, Estonia, founded in 1992. It provides professional higher education and applied research in the fields of technology, production, civil engineering, logistics, economics, and welfare. TTK UAS is the largest university of applied sciences in Estonia, currently educating about 3000 students.

The university has 6 institutes: the Institute of Architecture, Institute of Engineering and Circular Economy, Institute of Civil Engineering, Institute of Logistics, Institute of Technology and Institute of Service Economy.

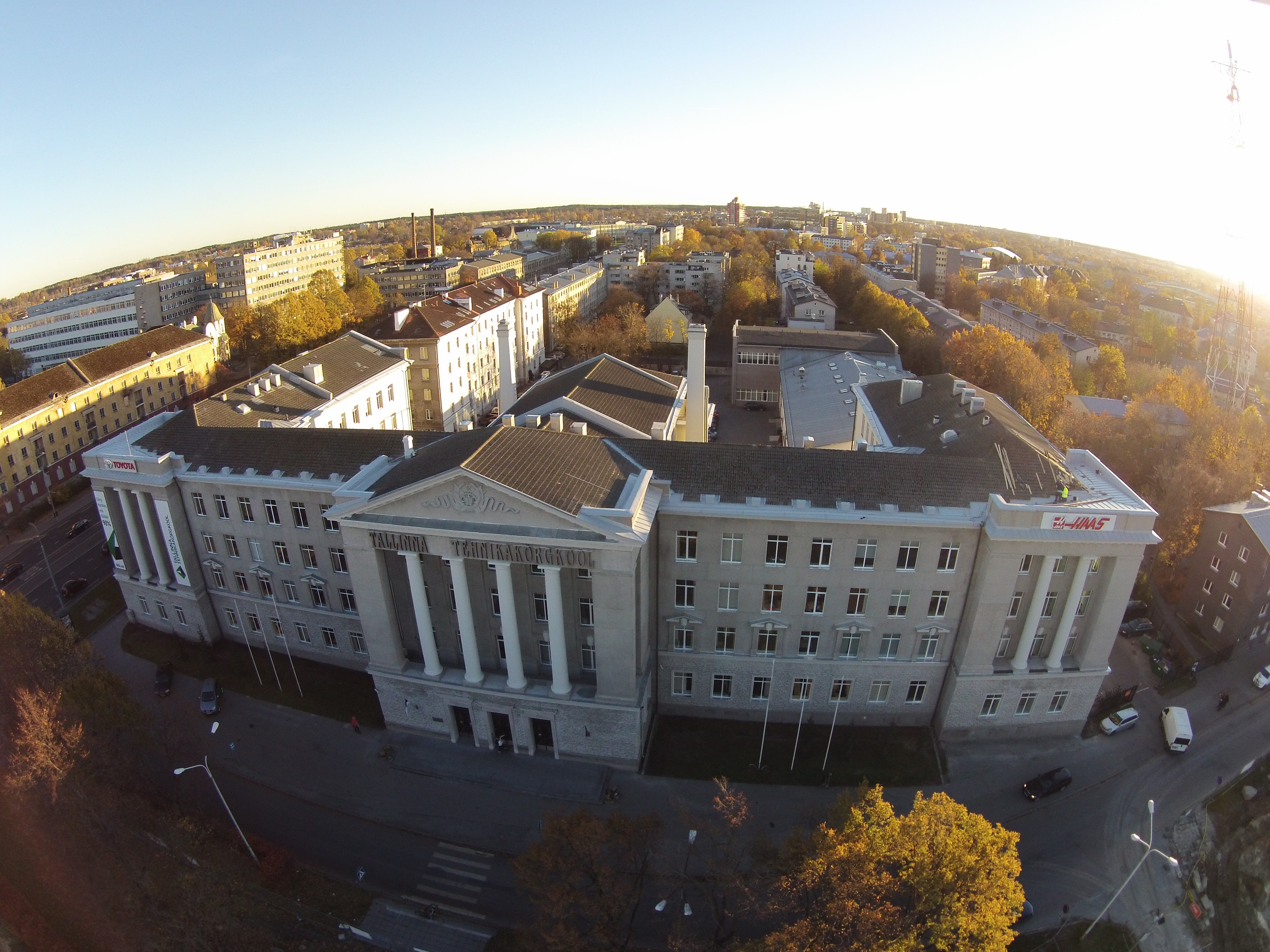

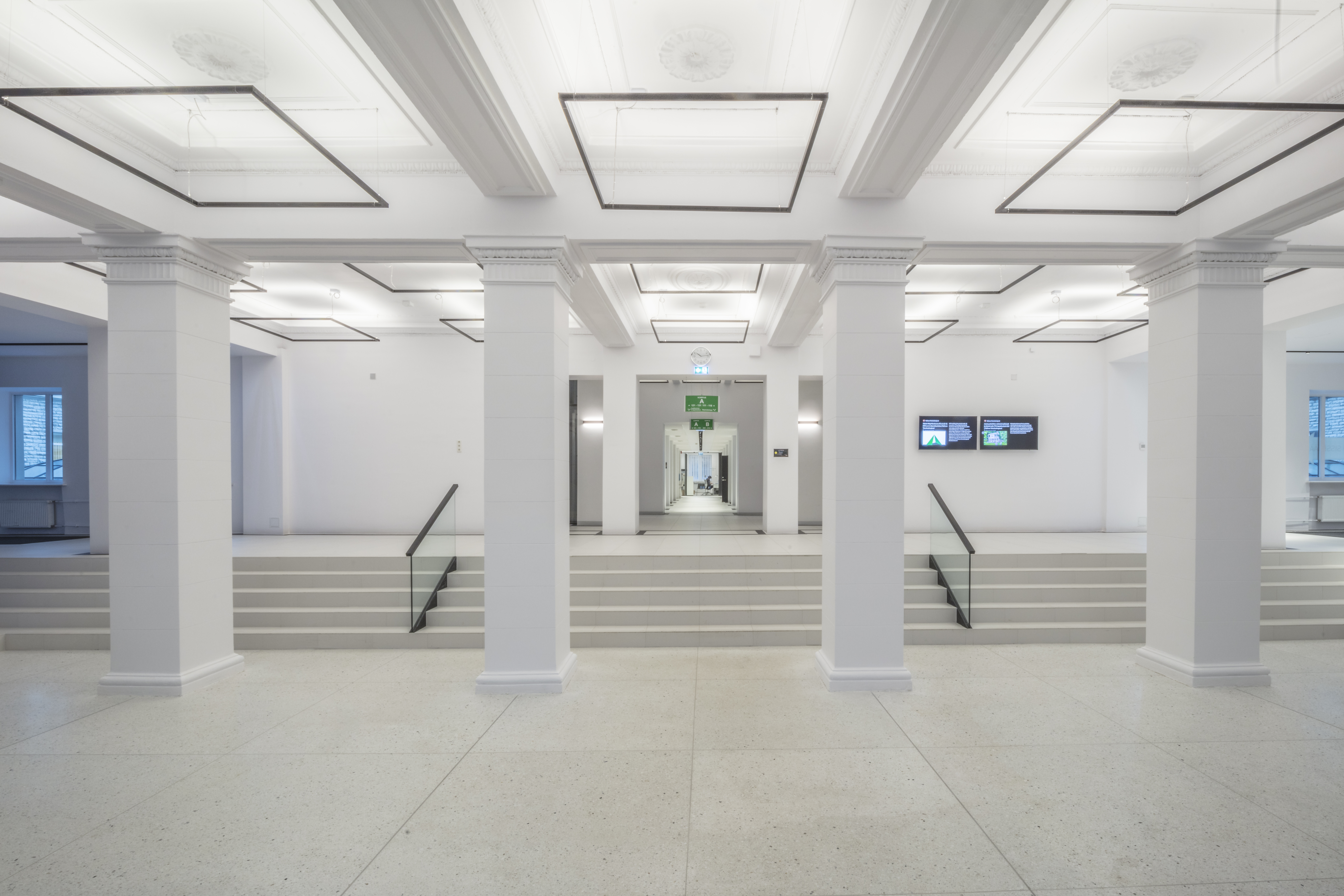
