= Pajaka, Estonia =

Village in Estonia

Coordinates: 59°04′N 24°26′E

Pajaka
- Village
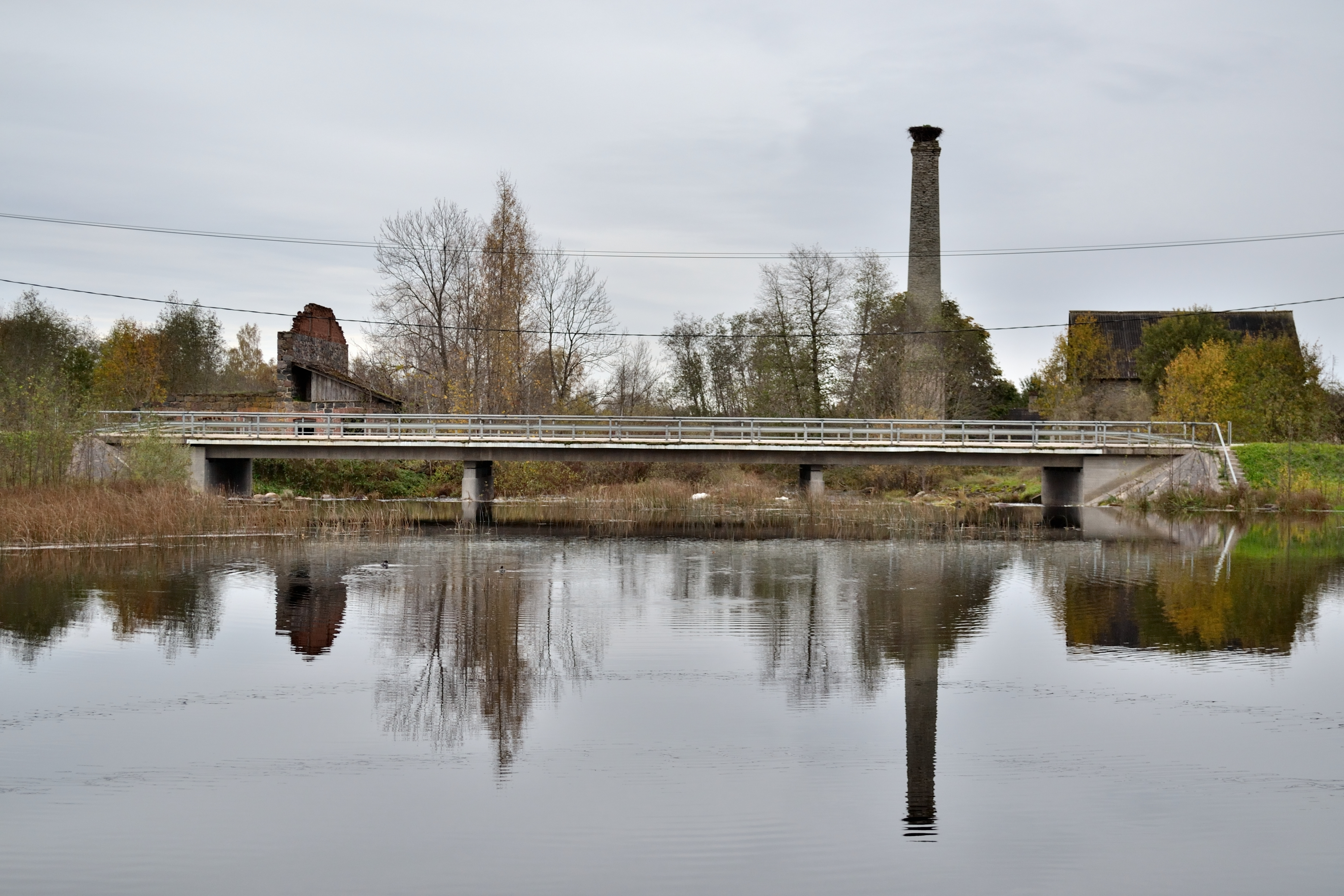
- Bridge over the Kasari River in Pajaka
- Interactive map of Pajaka
- Country: Estonia
- County: Rapla County
- Parish: Märjamaa Parish
- Time zone: UTC+2 (EET)
  - Summer (DST): UTC+3 (EEST)

Pajaka (German: Pajak) is a village in Märjamaa Parish, Rapla County in western Estonia. Pajaka has a population of 48 according to the 2021 census.

== History ==
In 1977, the former village of Jutapere was merged with Pajaka.

== Notable people ==
Notable people that were born or lived in Pajaka include the following:

- Aino Õige (1935–2018), botanist, born in Jutapere
