= Kullar Viimne =

Estonian film director and cinematographer

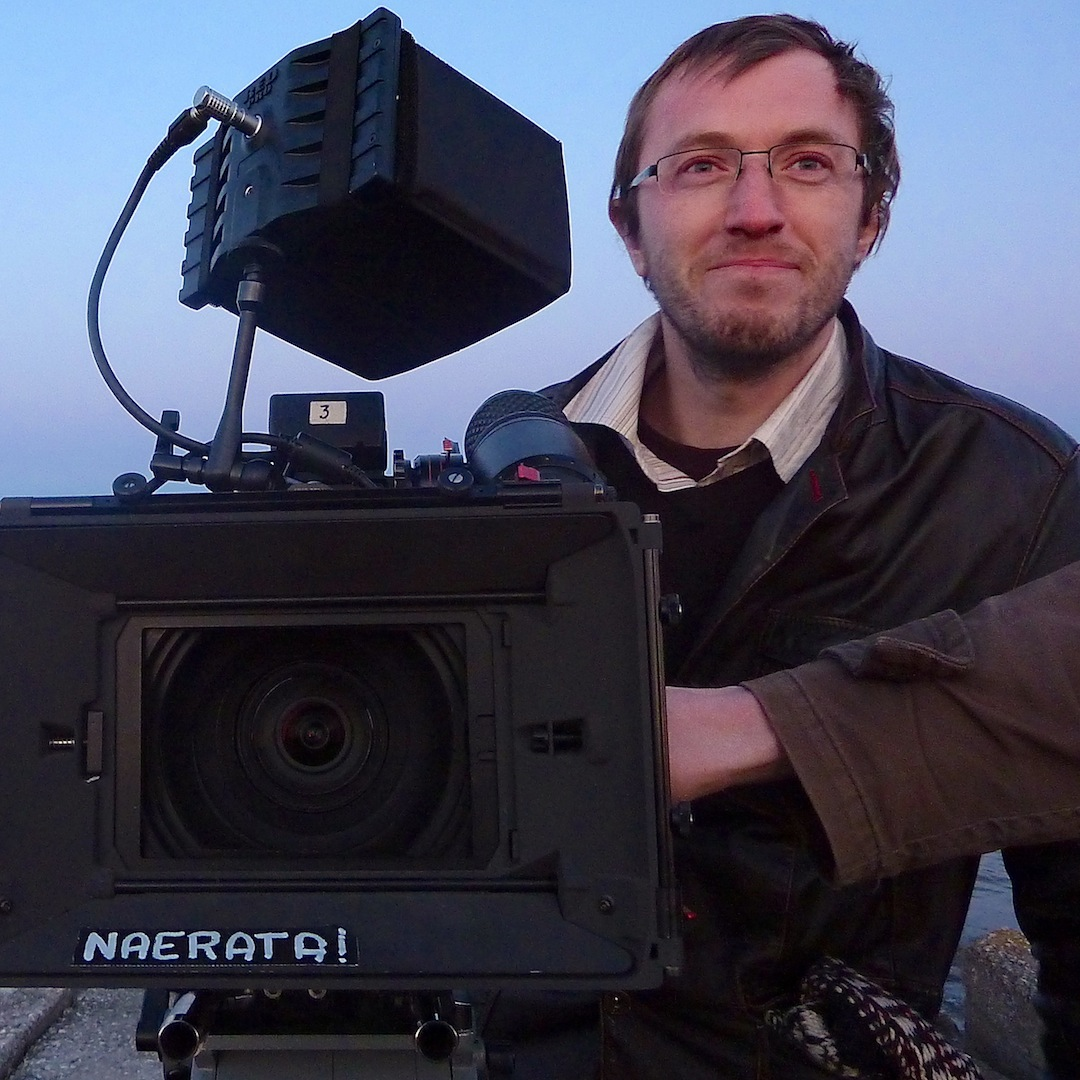
- Camera test in Paljassaare, Tallinn
- Born: March 22, 1980 (age 46); Võru, then part of Estonian SSR, Soviet Union
- Education: Baltic Film and Media School of Cinema, Tallinn University; film school FAMU (Czech Republic); IAD (Belgium)
- Occupations: director, scriptwriter, editor, cinematographer

Kullar Viimne (born March 22, 1980 in Võru) is an Estonian director, scriptwriter, editor and cinematographer.

Between 2004 and 2011, he studied at the Baltic Film and Media School of Cinema, Tallinn University. He furthered his education at the film school FAMU (Czech Republic) and IAD (Belgium).

== Filmography ==
=== As director ===
- Kuidas ma Aafrikat päästsin (2014)
- Jahis ainult naised (2012)
- Hing (2011)
- Ultra Vennikased (2009)
- Süütu (kaasautor, 2009)
- Viimnepäev (2006)
- Reis kerge pagasiga (2006)
- Jumalaga (2004)
- Kuhu lähed? (2003)

=== Cinematographer ===
- "Kuidas ma Aafrikat päästsin" (dir. Kullar Viimne, 2014)
- "Velosoofid" (dir. Jaan Tootsen, 2013)
- "Veregrupp" (dir. Leeni Linna, 2013)
- "Jahis ainult naised" (dir. Kullar Viimne, 2012)
- "Sinine Kõrb" (dir. Ruti Murusalu, 2012)
- "Sünnipäev" (dir. Erik Norkroos, 2012)
- "Üleloetud inimesed" (dir. Meelis Muhu, 2012)

== Awards ==
- Estonian Cultural Endowment Scholarship "Live and Shine" (2011)
- IX Estonian Film Days, the best Estonian documentary film Travelling Light (in 2007)
- XIX Pärnu Film Festival in the best Estonian documentary film "God" for the (2005)
- Estonian Cultural Endowment, a young filmmaker Scholarship (2004)
- Estonian Film Foundation, the young filmmaker Scholarship (2002)
