= Baltic Film, Media, Arts and Communication School of Tallinn University =

Unit of Tallinn University

Baltic Film, Media and Arts School of Tallinn University
- Type: Public
- Established: 2005
- Director: Riho Västrik
- Location: Tallinn, Estonia; 59°23′47″N 24°41′52″E
- Website: www.tlu.ee/bfm

Baltic Film, Media and Arts School of Tallinn University (BFM) is a film and media school created in 2005 (as Baltic Film and Media School) as a college of Tallinn University.

BFM provides students with free shooting and post-production equipment, studio space and production support for their creative works, supervised by established professionals from the audiovisual industry.

== Programs ==
BFM offers programs at the Bachelor's, Master's and PhD level in Estonian and English.

== BFM Training ==
BFM Training is the Baltic Film, Media and Arts School's training unit that offers tailor-made trainings and productions that correspond to the profiled needs of clients. Working languages include English, Estonian, Russian, and Finnish.

== Equipment and Room Rental ==
BFM offers the opportunity for people and organizations outside the school to rent the school's shooting equipment and editing rooms for commercial productions. The school has several production and editing rooms for rent: a 161 m^{2} film soundstage, a 112 m^{2} television studio with the service areas, a cinema hall, two sound mixing rooms, 3 sound editing rooms, 8 editing rooms and an 18-seat Apple iMac based computer lab with central SAN media storage. Information about booking.

== Notable alumni ==
- Sass Henno, Estonian screenwriter
- Kullar Viimne, Estonian director, screenwriter and cinematographer
- Erik Norkroos, Estonian filmmaker
- Tanel Toom, Estonian Oscar-nominated director and screenwriter

== Notable academic staff ==
- Tiina Lokk, Estonian filmmaker
- Riho Västrik, Estonian documentarian, journalist and historian
- Taavi Varm, Estonian artist
- Arvo Iho, Estonian cinematographer
- Mar Canet Sola, Artist and AI Art researcher
