= Estonian Nature Conservation Society =

Nature conservation organization based in Estonia

Estonian Nature Conservation Society (or Estonian Society for Nature Conservation; Estonian: Eesti Looduskaitse Selts, abbreviation ELKS) is a nature conservation organization based in Estonia. The goal of the organization is "to coordinate the relationship between nature and society, to value the national cultural heritage, to promote and advocate sustainable development, use of nature and landscape management, and to increase people's environmental awareness".

The organization was established in 1966 under the leadership of Jaan Eilart.

== Chairmen ==
- Edgar Tõnurist (1966–1981)
- Arnold Rüütel (1981–1988)
- Jaan Eilart (1988–1996)
- Arvo Iital (1996–1999)
- Juhan Telgmaa (1999–2013)
- Jaan Riis (2013–2017)
- Vootele Hansen (2017–2019)
- Toomas Tiivel (2019–2021)
- Kalev Sepp (since 2021)

== See also ==
- Estonian Naturalists' Society
