= Nele-Liis Vaiksoo =

Estonian singer and actress

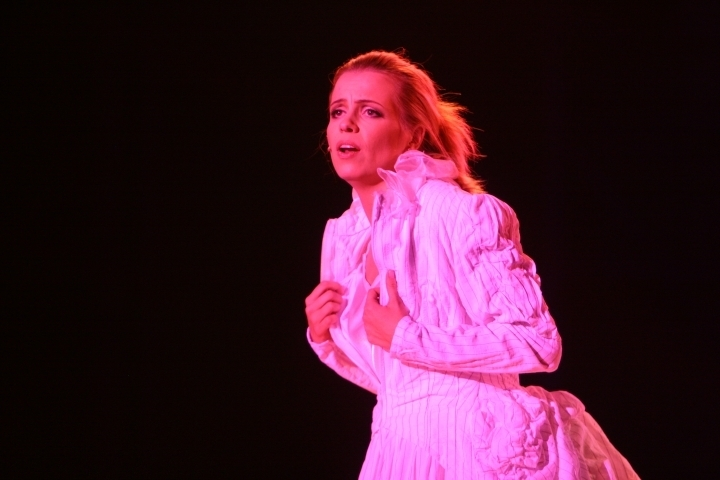
Nele-Liis Vaiksoo in "Fame" (2006)

Nele-Liis Vaiksoo (born 16 March 1984) is an Estonian singer and actress, known for her work in musical theatre.

== Biography ==
Nele-Liis Vaiksoo was born in Tallinn.

In the 1990s, she toured Europe with the Eesti Televisioon (ETV) Concert Choir, having been a member since childhood. At the same time, she studied piano at a local music school. In 2000, she placed fourth in the nationwide children’s song contest organized by ETV. Vaiksoo made her musical theatre debut in the 1998 Estonian production of The King and I.

On 7 November 2023, she was announced as one of the finalists of Eesti Laul 2024, the Estonian selection for the Eurovision Song Contest 2024, with the song "Käte ümber jää". Prior to this, she had participated in the Estonian pre-selection for Eurovision either as a backing singer, or member of multiple performing acts. Her entry was placed 3rd in the final round of the voting.

== Stage work ==
- 1998: The King and I (harem) Tallinn City Hall
- 2000: Tanz der Vampire (Sarah) Tallinn City Hall
- 2001: No, No, Nanette (choir artist) Tallinn City Hall
- 2001: Les Misérables (Factory Girl; Cosette, understudy) Tallinn City Hall
- 2002: Miss Saigon (Kim) Tallinn City Hall
- 2003: Miss Saigon (Kim, understudy) Luxembourg and Xanten (Germany)
- 2003: Aida (choir, Amneris, understudy) Vanemuine theatre
- 2003: Oliver! (Bet) Tallinn City Hall
- 2004: Crazy for You (choir)
- 2005: West Side Story (Maria) Vanemuine theatre
- 2005: Cats (Jemima) Vanemuine theatre
- 2005: Cinderella (Cinderella) Tallinn City Hall
- 2006: Fame (Serena) Tallinn City Hall
- 2007: Personals (Claire)
- 2007: Phantom (mother) Tallinn City Hall
- 2007: Pippi Longstocking (Pippi) Tallinn City Hall
- 2008: Tanz der Vampire (Sarah) Oberhausen, Germany
- 2011: Pippi Longstocking (Pippi) Estonian National Opera
- 2011: Mary Poppins (Mary Poppins) Vanemuine theatre
- 2012: Dreams from a Summer House, drama play, (Belle)
- 2013: Shrek (Fiona) Tallinn Youth Theatre
- 2017: Les Misérables (Fantine) Vanemuine theatre
- 2018: Beauty and the Beast (Babette) Vanemuine theatre
- 2019: West Side Story (Rosalia) Estonian National Opera
- 2019: The Maid of the North, oratorio, (Mutik)
- 2023: Lotte ja kadunud jõuluvana ("Lotte and the Lost Santa Claus"), (cough)
- 2024: The Prophet and the Idiot, multiple roles, drama play, Vanemuine theatre
- 2024: Kinky Boots, (Nicola), Vanemuine theatre
- 2025: The Seto Odyssey, (Kalipso), The Royal Seto Theatre

In addition to stage work, Vaiksoo is a voice actress, having provided Estonian voices for several animated films, including "Tangled" (Rapunzel), "The Lion King" (Nala) and "Frozen 2" (Queen Iduna).

She has participated in TV entertainment shows, such as "Your Face Sounds Familiar", and has raised awareness about cancer and premature births by taking part in charity events.

== Discography ==
In 2003 the album We Are Family was released, which was recorded by Vaiksoo and eight other Estonian solo artists, such as Kaire Vilgats, Maiken, Bert Pringi, Lauri Liiv, and Lauri Pihlap. In 2008 she released a Christmas album together with Rolf Roosalu.

In 2011, Nele-Liis Vaiksoo released a concept album of the musical Pipi Pikksukk ("Pippi Longstocking") in which she played the lead character, Pipi.

In 2013, she released an album Mina ("Me") to celebrate her 15 years on musical stage. The album consists of numbers from different musicals in which she has, or still hoped to be playing in (Les Miserables, Little Shop of Horrors, Cats, Cabaret, Chess and many more).

2021 saw the release of "Valguses ja varjus", a tribute album to lyricist Leelo Tungal and her accomplishments in Estonian music.

== Personal life ==
Nele-Liis Vaiksoo lives in Tallinn, she is a mother of two. Her mother Liia Vaiksoo is a theatrical costume designer, her father Raul Vaiksoo is an architect and publicist. Her brother Raul Markus Vaiksoo is a folk dance teacher.
