= The New World (2011 film) =

2011 film

- Film poster
- Estonian: Uus Maailm
- Directed by: Jaan Tootsen
- Written by: Jaak Kilmi; Jaan Tootsen
- Produced by: Jaak Kilmi
- Starring: Jaan Tootsen
- Release date: 6 October 2011
- Running time: 88 minutes
- Country: Estonia
- Language: Estonian

The New World (Estonian: Uus Maailm) is a 2011 Estonian documentary film about New World Society, a citizens' initiative in Uus Maailm, Tallinn, that aims to remake neighbourhoods and change people's lives. Written and directed by Jaan Tootsen, it was presented with the award for Best Film by the Estonian Association of Film Journalists.
