= Taavi Varm =

Estonian artist

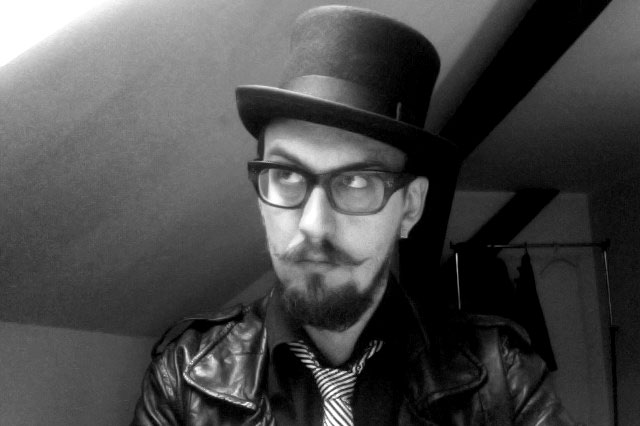
Taavi Varm (2011)

Taavi Varm (born 2 June 1979) is an Estonian artist.

== Education ==
Taavi Varm was born in Tallinn. He studied at the Tallinn Art Gymnasium in Estonia from 1991 to 1997. In 1997 to 1998 he studied at Sogndal Folk High School in Norway. After graduating from high school Varm continued his studies at the Tartu Art College in Estonia. In 2012, he graduated from the university with a bachelor's degree in media and advertisement design. His final thesis was the making of new media performance "FUNK KON". In 2013 he began his studies on at Aalto University in Finland, master's degree in new media.

== Work ==
Since 2001, he has been giving lectures in various Estonian universities such as, Tartu Art College, Estonian Academy of Arts, Tallinn University Baltic Film and Media School and University of Tartu Viljandi Culture Academy). As a video artist he has done over thirty theatre videos and set design.

== Selection of productions ==
- 2017 Unity DOME – Brussels, Belgium
- 2014 Estonian Song and Dance Celebration, Designer
- 2013 Night Song Celebration "Järjepidevus" - visual creative advisor video mapping
- 2012 Direction of play FUNK KON
- 2012 Multimedia lab and Blackbox - preparation of public procurement and expert opinions (UT Viljandi Culture Academy)
- 2011 LHV Bank video mapping
- 2010–11 Estonian Music and Design Café (Tallinn 2011)
- 2010 90th anniversary of Estonian Drama theatre video mapping
- 2010 MIMproject goes Helsinki (Tallinn, 2011) mimproject.org
- 2009 Estonian Song and Dance Celebration animation clips – Orbital Vox
- 2009 More & Gerda music video "Ma ei kuule sind"
- 2008 Night Song Celebration "Märkamisaeg" video clips

== Video Art, installations, video mapping, LIVE ==
- 2018 Restaurant ULTIMA, Interactive LED light wall and ceiling “Shadow Rabbit” installation, Sotamaa, Helsinki, Finland
- 2018 Estonia 100 Kira Skov/Maria Faust “In the beginning” concert at Brorson kirke, Copenhagen Denmark
- 2018 EVR Cargo short movie and video projection, Tallinn
- 2018 Estonia 100 „Põhjamaa pulss“ concert by Kristjan Järvi, Estonia, Tallinn
- 2018 Estonia 100 Mapping on Freedom square – Tallinn Estonia
- 2018 Estonia 100 “Eile nägin ma Eestimaad” live concert by Rasmus Puur, Pärnu Estonia
- 2018 Estonia 100 – Flag Mapping – Tallinn Estonia
- 2018 Estonia 100 „Nordic Passion“ tour – Estonia
- 2018 “Rand ja Tuulberg 25”, cool mapping project, technical, Lennusadam, Estonia
- 2017 Unity DOME – Brussels, Belgium
- 2017 World Expo Astana 2017 Led animation and Sound Design – Georgian Pavilion
- 2017 World Expo Astana 2017 VR pavilion – Sotamaa, Finnish Pavilion
- 2017 Kaubamaja sound and space “Buttons edition”– Tartu Department store
- 2017 Opening Concert, Estonia Presidency of the Council of the European Union -Tallinn
- 2016 Kaubamaja sound and space – Tallinn Department store
- 2016 Fazer Visitor Centre, 14 m interactive wall – Sotamaa, Helsinki
- 2016 Fazer Visitor Centre, Fazer Blue factory mapping – Sotamaa, Helsinki
- 2016 Estonia 98 gala/performance – Video mapping – Estonia Theatre
- 2016 Ewert and two dragons – Live performance video – Tallinn
- 2016 Velocipede – Live performance video for Maria Faust
- 2016 Nordic Sounds – Live performance video for Villu Veski band – Nordic Hotel, Kumu
- 2015 Estonian Chamber of Commerce 90 Years, Estonia Theatre, Estonia
- 2014 Kuressaare merepäevad, Saaremaa, Estonia
- 2013 BMW X5 presentation in KUMU, Tallinn
- 2013 Night Song Celebration "Järjepidevus", Tartu
- 2013 Estonian National Public Library 95 years, Tallinn
- 2013 Iiris single “Tigerhead” mapping on Estonian Foreign Ministry
- 2012 “Narva College of the University of Tartu”, Narva
- 2012 “Blue Sirius”, Port of Tallinn
- 2011 “Song of the Tower Bells” – The closing ceremony of European Capital of Culture Tallinn 2011, Tallinn's Freedom Square
- 2011 “LHV bank” – LHV Bank opening, City Plaza with Andres Tenusaar, Raivo Möllits, George Bigiakis, Aleks Tenusaar
- 2011 “Objekt 2011” – opening, Tallinn's Freedom Square
- 2010 “Hammaste tervise kuu”, Tallinn's Freedom Square with Taavet Jansen and Andres Tenusaar
- 2010 “Dramatheater 90”, Drama theatre facade with Taavet Jansen and Andres Tenusaar
- 2003 Alphabet

== Films ==
- 2016 "Mistra" animation film – Mask
- 2016 “Rock ON II” – FX, video mapping for feature movie – Mumbai, Nirvana Films
- 2010 "Estonian Fairytales" – Enterprise Estonia
- 2010 Dance film "Young man listening to music on a bicycle”
- 2009 Music film "White Noise" for Märt-Matis Lill composition
- 2008 Stereo film "Fire Dots in the Darkness" for Märt-Matis Lill composition
- 2006 "Vanadaami visiit" – stage designer Ain Nurmela's assistant
- 2001 Dance film "According to law" with Katrin Essensoniga Arvo Pärdi statue opening in Rakvere / Estonian National Television live

== Theatre direction ==
- 2017 “000- Xanax” work in progress, NUQ Festival, Tallinn
- 2012 "FUNK KON" – Kanuti Gildi SAAL, Tallinn

== Theatre video and set design ==
- 2018 “KERES” – Ballet, Estonia, Vaba Lava
- 2018 “Sweeney Todd“ – Vanemuine, Tartu
- 2017 “Lapsepõlvebänd” – Vanemuine, Tartu
- 2017 “000- Xanax” work in progress, NUQ Festival, Tallinn
- 2017 “Nurjatu Saar” Rock Opera – Saaremaa, Estonia
- 2016 “I’d rather dance with you” – Vaba Lava, RAAM
- 2016 “Lumekuninganna” – Vanemuine, Tartu
- 2015 “Lumekininganna” - Vanemuine
- 2015 “Öö Pariisis” – Vanemuine
- 2014 “Ooperi Fantoom” - Vanemuine
- 2014 “12 Movements” – Cabaret Rhizome
- 2012 "Tiiger, Tiiger!" – Endla Theatre
- 2012 "Musta Pori Näkku" – Vanemuine
- 2012 "Täna õhtul: Seeri Feibok” – Cabaret Rhizome
- 2011 “Hamlet Anderson” – Endla Theater
- 2011 “Nullpunkt” video + set design – Rakvere Theatre
- 2011 “Reality Show” Open Tallinn 2011, Kalevi Sport Hall
- 2011 “Võlanõudjad” – Estonian Drama Theatre
- 2010 “Transformer” – Kanuti Gildi SAAL
- 2010 “Quevedo” – Vanemuine theatre
- 2010 “Bastien ja Bastienne” – Estonian Concert
- 2010 “Vassiljev ja Bubõr ta tegid siia...” – Estonian Drama Theatre
- 2010 “Kirjaklambritest vöö” – VAT Theatre
- 2009 “Vombat” – Estonian Drama Theatre
- 2008 “Ingel Ingel vii mind taeva“ – VAT Theatre
- 2008 “Sigma tau C-705“ – Estonian Drama Theatre
- 2007 “Salasõber“ – Endla theatre
- 2007 nuunioon “LP 33 1/3 rpm “– kanuti gildi SAAL
- 2007 “Jean d’Arc“ – Birgitta Festival
- 2006 “Lumumm“ – Rakvere Theatre
- 2006 “aaron:juuni“ – Rakvere Theatre
- 2004 “Sebastian” – Tallinn City Theatre (with Andres Tenusaar)
- 2004 “it’s getting so dark” Helena Tulve chamber opera – Tallinn City Theatre
- 2002 “Kunksmoor ja kapten Trumm” – Estonian Drama Theatre
- 2002 “Kajakamägi” – Estonian Drama Theatre
- 2002 “Vapper keefir” – Estonian Puppet theatre
- 2002 “aurora temporalis” – Tartu Teatrilabor / Lendav Hollandlane
- 2002 “Erepunane lilleke” – Estonian Puppet Theatre
- 2001 “ameerika” – Tartu Teatrilabor / Lendav Hollandlane
- 2001 “une luup. uus elyseum” trailer – Tartu Teatrilabor / Lendav Hollandlane

== Exhibitions ==
- 2014 Dark Shadows, Helsinki Finland
- 2000 „FASTsoulFOOD“ Obu Galerii, Paide Vallitorn, Tampere art school (with Martin Rästa)
- 1995 „Moving Art“ Kullo Lastegalerii (with Andres Tenusaar)

== Articles ==
- 2008–2009 Tech culture magazine “Maatriks”
- 2011-2011 Tech culture magazine “21”
