= Ülle =

Female given name

- Gender: Female
- Language: Estonian
- Name day: 19 February (Estonia)

Origin
- Region of origin: Estonia

Other names
- Related names: Ülvi

Ülle is an Estonian feminine given name, a feminine form of the masculine given name Ülo.

People named Ülle include:

- Ülle Aaskivi (1950–2007), politician
- Ülle Jaakma (born 1957), agronomist, veterinarian and university rector
- Ülle Kaljuste (born 1957), actress
- Ülle Kukk (born 1937), botanist and conservationist
- Ülle Lichtfeldt (born 1970), actress
- Ülle Madise (born 1974), lawyer and current Chancellor of Justice
- Ülle Rajasalu (born 1953), politician
- Ülle Toming (born 1955), dancer and actress
- Ülle Ulla (1934–2016), ballet dancer, actress, dance teacher and opera singer
- Kauksi Ülle (born 1962 as Ülle Kahusk), poet
