= Wõrumaa Teataja =

Estonian newspaper

- Publisher: AS Võru Teataja
- Founded: 1995
- Language: Estonian
- Website: Official website

Wõrumaa Teataja (from 1995 to 2001 Võrumaa Teataja) is a newspaper published in Võru, Estonia. The use of the letter W instead of V in the title is a deliberate use of obsolete Estonian spelling.

Its precursors were Võru Teataja (originally spelled Wõru Teataja), published from 1913 to 1935 and from 1988 to 1994, and Võrumaa Teataja, published from 1941 to 1944.
