= Ülo Vilimaa =

Estonian dancer, choreographer, theatre director, and painter (1941–2021)

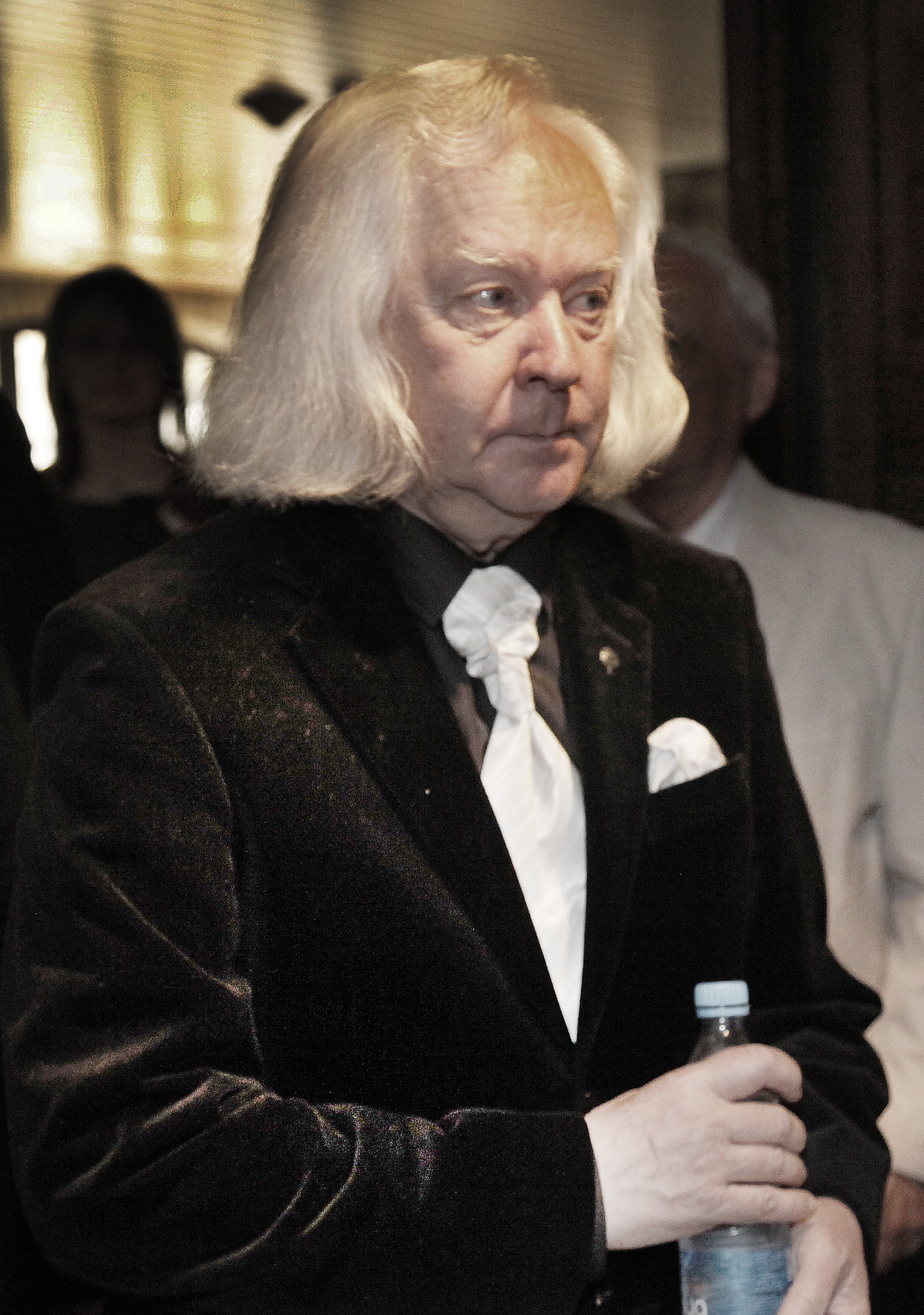
Ülo Vilimaa, 2013

Ülo Vilimaa (13 March 1941 – 27 September 2021) was an Estonian dancer, choreographer, theatre director, and painter.

== Career ==
From 1962 until 1974, he was ballet soloist and ballet master at the Vanemuine theatre, and from 1974 until 1997 principal ballet master. From 1997 until 2002, he was a director at the Vanemuine theatre.

In addition Vilimaa was also a painter. His personal exhibitions have been shown in Estonia and abroad.

Awards:

- 1970 Merited Artist of Estonian SSR
- 2001 Order of the White Star, III class.
