= Viidumäe Nature Reserve =

Protected area in Estonia

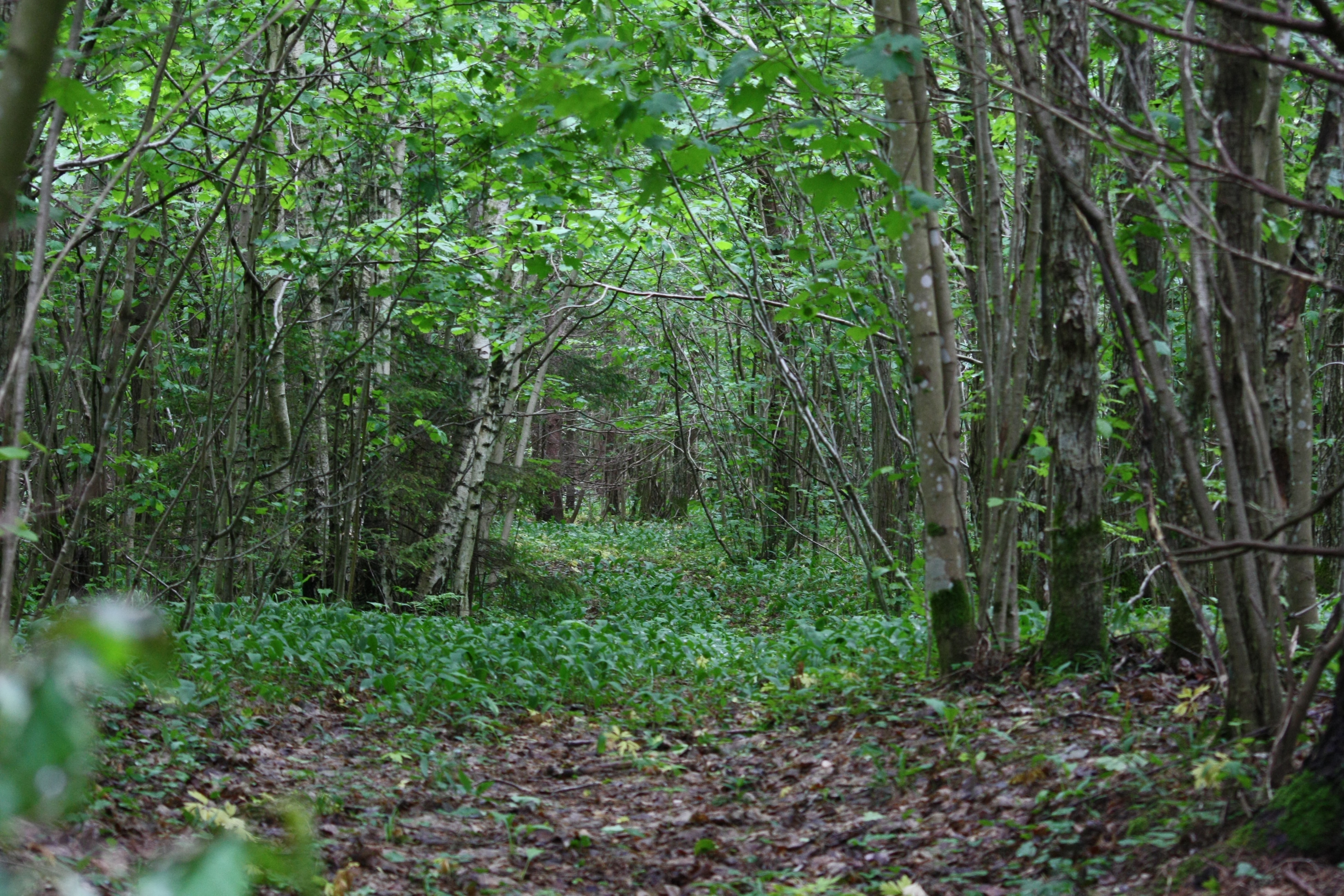

- Location within Estonia
- Location: Estonia
- Nearest city: Kuressaare
- Coordinates: 58°17′23″N 22°08′02″E
- Area: 11.94 km^{2} (2,950 acres)
- Established: 1957

Viidumäe Nature Reserve (Estonian: Viidumäe looduskaitseala) is a nature reserve situated on Saaremaa in western Estonia, in Saare County.

Viidumäre nature reserve consists mostly of pine- and oak-forest, complemented with meadows, bogs and traditionally utilised wooded meadows. The nature reserve is located in the west of Saaremaa, on the oldest and highest lying part of the island. The nature reserve is important for its great biodiversity. As regards the flora, the nature reserve is home to the Rhinanthus osiliensis, a species of rattle which can only be found on Saaremaa and Gotland islands in the Baltic Sea. Other notable species include red helleborine, marsh helleborine, Kashubian vetch and rock whitebeam. The bird life is rich with species like black woodpecker, Eurasian pygmy owl, black stork and white-tailed eagle as typical representatives. Mammals such as elk and wild boar are frequent in the area. Facilities for visitors include bird watching towers, hiking trails with information boards and a visitor centre.
