= Piret Jaaks =

Estonian writer and playwright

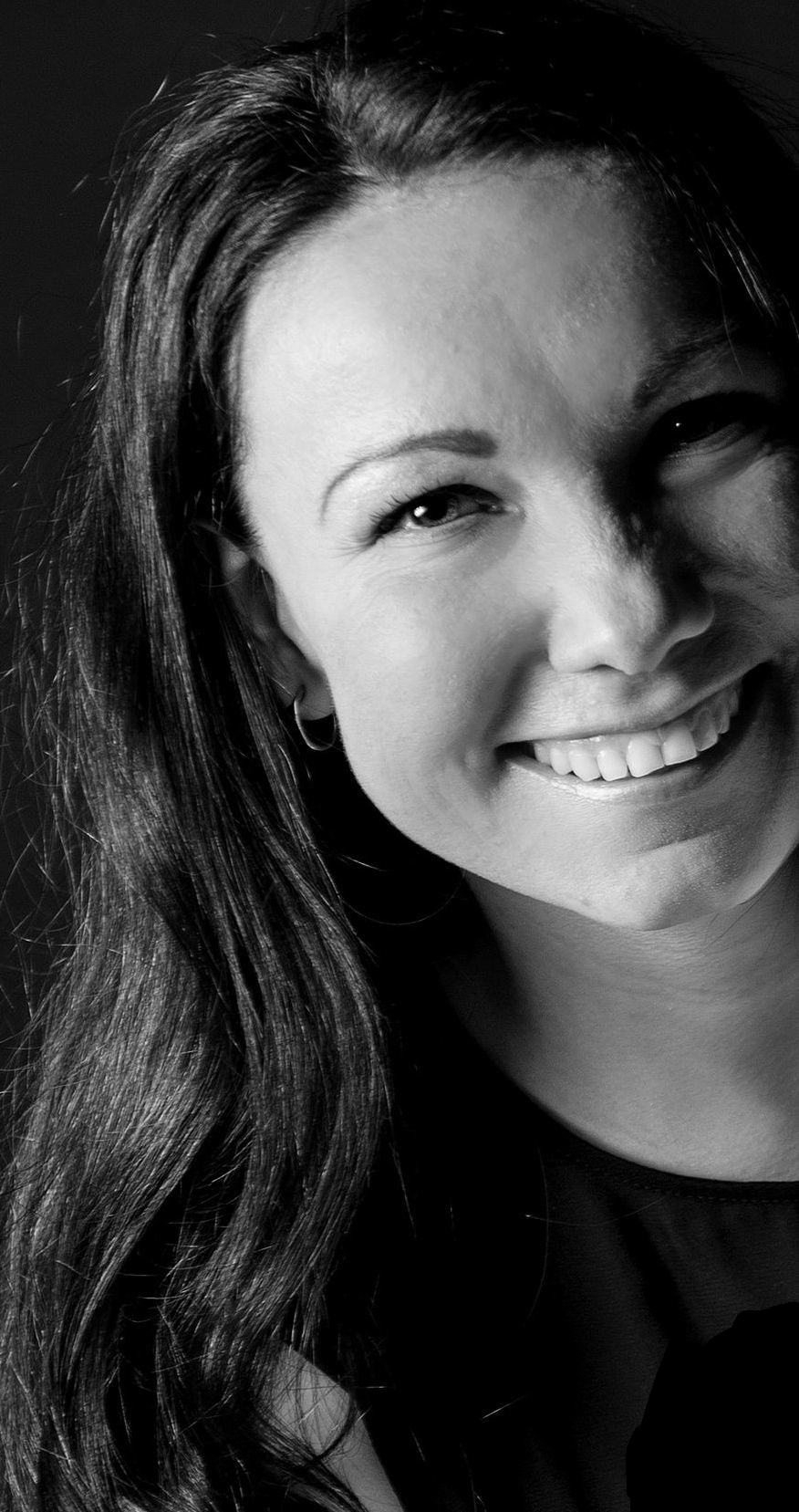
Piret Jaaks

Piret Jaaks (born 5 August 1980) is an Estonian writer and playwright.

She has graduated from University of Tartu in theatre science. After graduating, she started her doctoral studies at Estonian Academy of Music and Theatre.

She has written several children's plays and these plays are staged at Piip and Tuut Theatre in Tallinn. She has also written children's books.
