= Ülo Varul =

Estonian basketball player

Ülo Varul (Estonian pronunciation: [/ylo vɑrul/]) (4 October 1952 – 13 October 2016) was an Estonian basketball player who was born and raised in Tartu. He was 190 cm (74.8 in) tall.

== History ==
From 1967 to 1972, he studied at the Tallinn Sports Boarding School (TSIK) and at the Tallinn Construction and Mechanical Engineering School.

He started playing basketball at the EPA Sports Club as a student of August Soku.

In 1972 and 1975–1979, Varul was a member of the Estonia men's national basketball team. In 1973, he was second place at the Estonian Championships of the Tallinn Kalev team. In 1974–1975 in Ehitaja and from 1975–1979 elsewhere, he was a member of Kalev's representative team.

He was in 8th place in the 1975 USSR Nations Spartakiat and the 1979 in the NRL MVs, 1st place in the Baltic Cup in 1976 and 1977, 7th place in the 1977 NRL MVs, and 2nd place in the 1978 and 1987 NRL Cups.
