= Toivo Tootsen =

Estonian politician (born 1943)

Toivo Tootsen (born 17 June 1943 in Rõuge) is an Estonian journalist, writer and politician. He has been member of IX, X and XI Riigikogu.

He is a member of Estonian Centre Party. His brother was journalist and politician Ülo Tootsen and his sons are filmmaker Jaan Tootsen and writer Tõnis Tootsen.
