= Ülo Kiiler =

Estonian writer (1942–2010)

- Born: 17 November 1942; Pärnu
- Died: 5 July 2010 (aged 67)
- Education: Tartu State University

Ülo Kiiler (17 November 1942 – 5 July 2010) was an Estonian writer and humorist.

== Early life ==
Ülo Kiiler was born on 17 November 1942 in Pärnu, Estonia during the occupation by Nazi Germany. His father Elmar Kiiler was killed by the Germany Army in 1944, when Ülo was two years old.

He attended school in Viljandi before studying law at Tartu State University.

== Career ==
Kiiler published several humorous and short stories in newspapers.

In 1979, Kiiler published Märgikogujale (lit. 'For the Badge Collector'), a pioneering handbook in the field.

== Death ==
Kiiler died on 5 July 2010.

== Bibliography ==
- Märgikogujale [For the Badge Collector] (in Estonian). Tallinn: Valgus. 1979. ISBN 978-9916-5-8726-3.
- Vibukits (in Estonian). Viljandi. 2006.
