= Meelis Muhu =

Estonian film director

Meelis Muhu (born 11 August 1972) is an Estonian documentary film director, producer and actor.

Muhu was born in Paide. 2003-2010 he worked at Ministry of Culture's department of arts (Estonian: Eesti Kultuuriministeeriumi kunstide osakond).

== Selected filmography and film roles ==
- 1995: Wikmani poisid (television series; role: Vare)
- 2008: "Aljoša" (documentary film; director)
- 2009: "Kihnu kosjad" (documentary film; director)
- 2009: "Kihnu pulm" (documentary film; director)
