= Urve Tauts =

Estonian opera singer (born 1935)

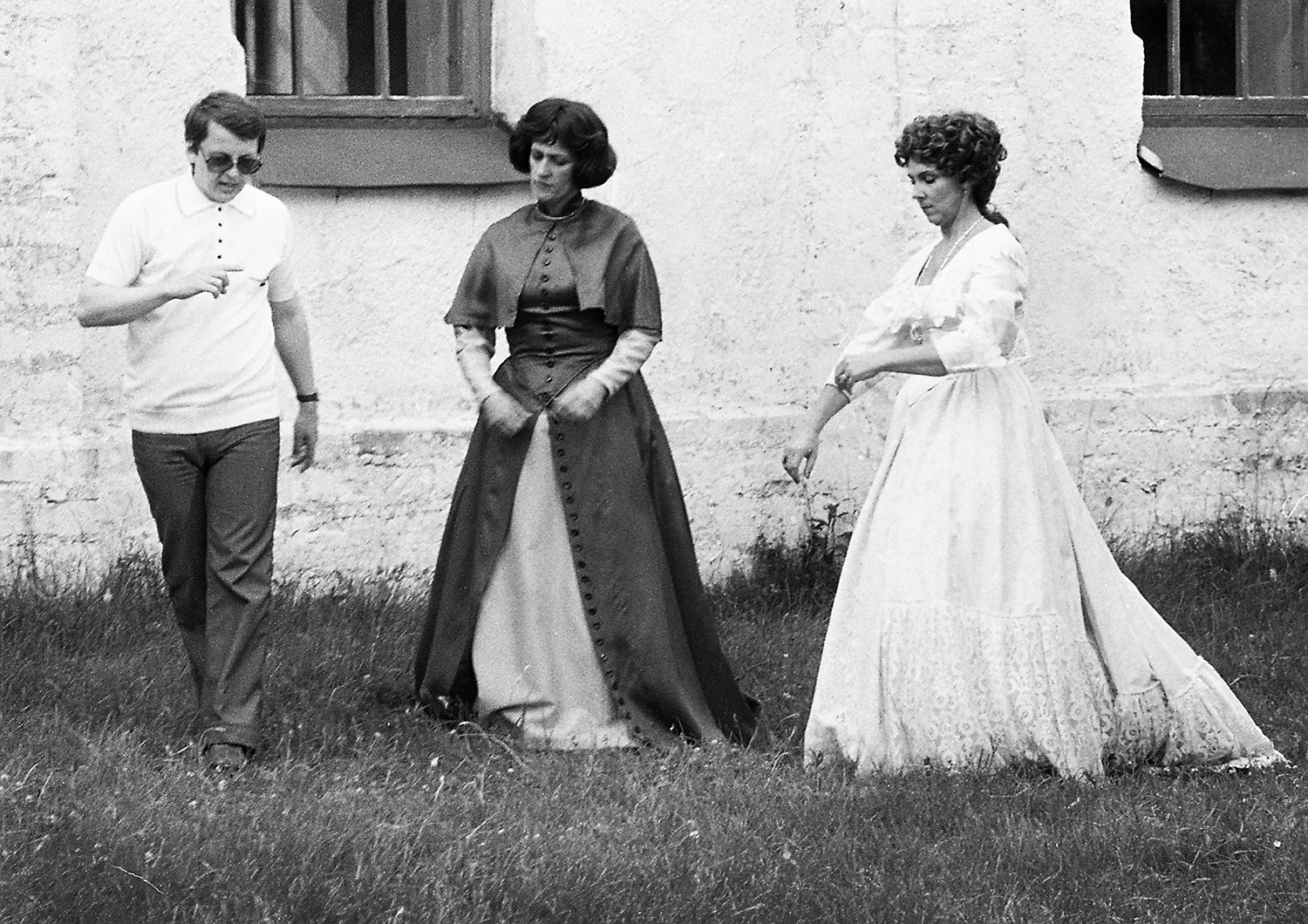
Enn Eesmaa, Urve Tauts and Margarita Voites in 1980

Urve Tauts (born 2 November 1935 in Pärnu) is an Estonian opera singer (mezzo-soprano).

In 1963, she graduated from Tallinn State Conservatory in singing specialty.

1960–2001, she was the soloist in Estonian National Opera.

1974–1978, she taught singing at Georg Ots Tallinn Music School and 1978–2002 at Tallinn State Conservatory (later Estonian Academy of Music and Theatre).

== Awards ==
- 1968 Honoured Worker in Arts of Estonian SSR
- 1969 Annual Theatre Award
- 1974 People's Artist of Estonian SSR
- 1980 Georg Ots Prize

== Operatic roles ==
During her long stage career, she has performed over 70 stage characters.

Her operatic roles:

- Voice of Antonia's Mother (Jacques Offenbach's The Tales of Hoffmann, 1957 and 1988)
- Cherubino (Wolfgang Amadeus Mozart's Le nozze di Figaro, 1958)
- Lyubasha (Nikolai Rimsky-Korsakov's The Tsar's Bride, 1959)
- Katharina (Vissarion Shebalin's The Taming of the Shrew, 1960)
- Ulrica (Giuseppe Verdi's Un Ballo in maschera, 1961 and 1985)
- Emilia (Giuseppe Verdi's Othello, 1963)
- Carmen (Georges Bizet's Carmen, 1963 and 1982)
- Suzuki (Giacomo Puccini's Madama Butterfly, 1963 and 1991)
- 3rd Lady (Wolfgang Amadeus Mozart's Die Zauberflöte, 1964 and 1991)
- Amneris (Giuseppe Verdi's Aida, 1964)
- Iige (Eino Tamberg's Iron Home, 1965)
- Olga (Pyotr Tchaikovsky's Eugene Onegin, 1966)
- Filipyevana (Pyotr Tchaikovsky Eugene Onegin, 1986 and 2000)
- Azucena (Giuseppe Verdi's Il trovatore, 1967 and 1993)
- Maddalena (Giuseppe Verdi's Rigoletto, 1968)
- Laura (Amilcare Ponchielli's Gioconda, 1969)
- Anna von Tödwen (Eduard Tubin's Barbara von Tisenhusen, 1969 and 1990)
- Céline (Dmitry Kabalebsky's Colas Breugnon, 1970)
- Octavian (Richard Strauss's Der Rosenkavalier, 1970)
- Eboli (Giuseppe Verdi's Don Carlos, 1971)
- Frugola, The Princess, Zita (Giacomo Puccini's Il trittico: Il tabarro, 1972; Sour Angelica 1972; Gianni Schicchi, 1972 and 1997)
- Judith (Béla Bartók's Bluebeard's Castle, concert performance, 1972)
- Felicia (Leo Normet's Pear Tree, 1973)
- Herodias (Richard Strauss's Salome, 1973)
- Flora (Giuseppe Verdi's La Traviata, 1974)
- Roxane's duenna (Eino Tamberg's Cyrano de Bergerac, 1976)
- Santuzza (Pietro Mascagni's Cavalleria rusticana, 1978)
- Female voice (Francis Poulenc's La voix humaine, 1978)
- The Marquise of Berkenfield (Gaetano Donizetti's The Daughter of the Regiment, 1979)
- Nurse (Modest Mussorgsky's Boris Godunov, 1980, 1985 and 2001)
- The Innkeeper (Modest Mussorgsky's Boris Godunov, 1980 and 1985)
- Federica (Giuseppe Verdi's Luisa Miller, 1981)
- Háta (Bedřich Smetana's The Bartered Bride, 1983)
- Duneya (Sergei Prokofiev's Betrothal in a Monastery, 1982)
- Mary (Richard Wagner's The Flying Dutchman, 1984)
- Mrs. Lippe (Alo Põldmäe's Town Hall Opera, 1986)
- Marfa (Modest Mussorgsky's Hovanshchina, 1987)
- Kristi (Eduard Tubin's The Parson of Reigi, 1988)
- Marta (Arrigo Boito's Mefistofele, 1988)
- Woman (Aulis Sallinen's The Horseman, 1991)
- Mrs. Herring (Benjamin Britten's Albert Herring, 1993)
- Czipra (Johann Strauss's Der Zigeunerbaron, 1993)
- Berta (Gioachino Rossini's The Barber of Seville, 1994)
- Anhilte (Imre Kálmán's Silva, 1995)
- Nan (Olav Ehala's The Imp, 1999)
- Countess Ceprano (Giuseppe Verdi's Rigoletto, 2003)
