= Jaan Eilart =

Estonian botanist and conservationist

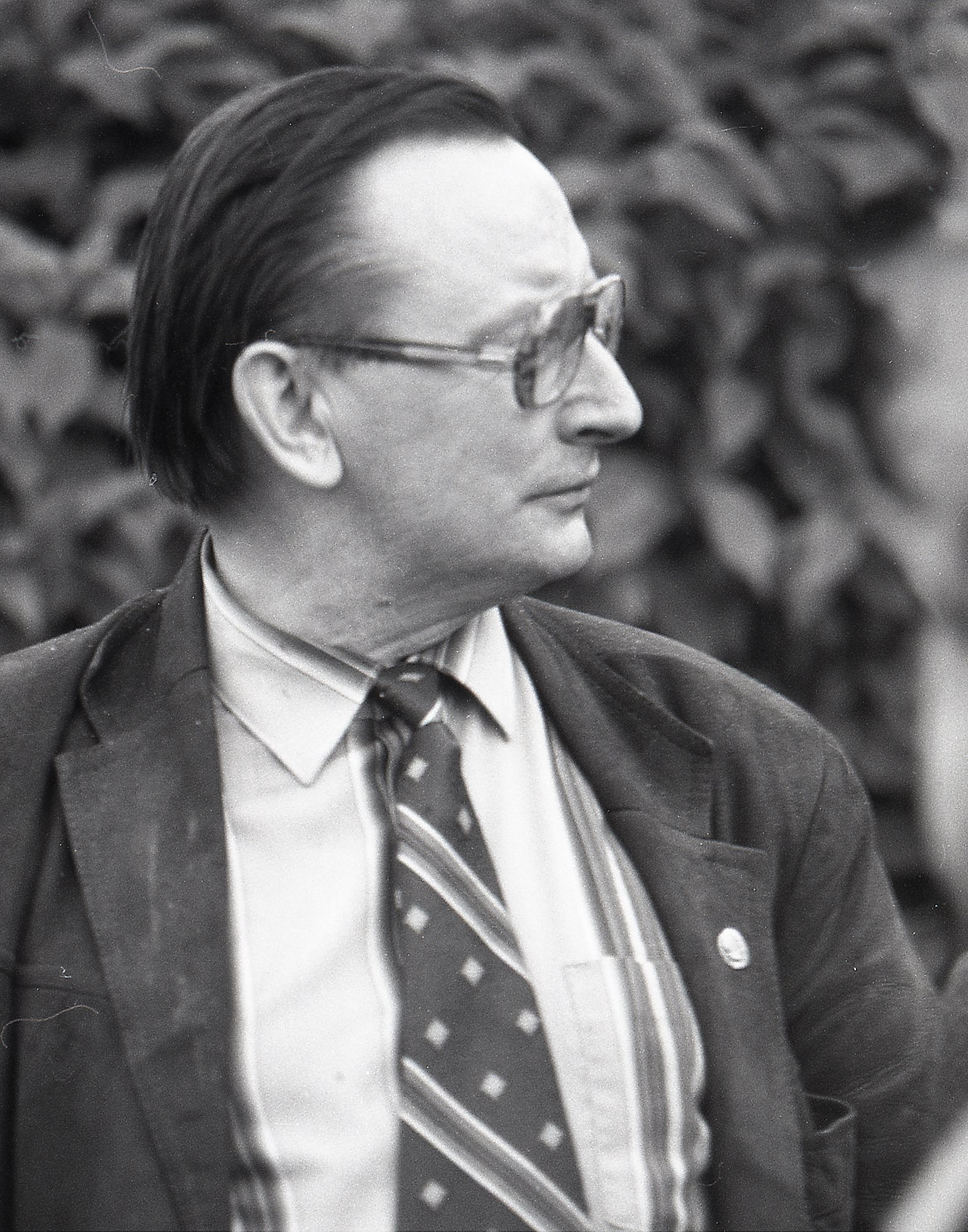
Jaan Eilart in 1983

Jaan Eilart (24 June 1933 – 18 May 2006) was an Estonian phytogeographer, landscape ecologist, cultural historian and conservationist.

Eilart was born in Pala, Kirna Parish, Järva County. In 1957 he started teaching conservation as a subject in the Tartu State University. In 1958 he established the Tartu Students' Nature Protection Circle (Estonian: Tartu Üliõpilaste Looduskaitsering; TÜLKR), which is allegedly the oldest student's community dedicated to conservation, and in 1966 he established the Estonian Nature Conservation Society (Eesti Looduskaitse Selts; ELKS). In 1969 Eilart led the establishment of Lahemaa National Park which was the first national park in the Soviet Union. Later he also instructed the establishment of national parks in Komi, Armenia and Tajikistan. Eilart held the chair of Eastern-European Committee of IUCN from 1982 to 1990. He died, aged 72, in Tartu.

== Bibliography ==
- 1963: Viidumägi – haruldaste taimede kodu (Viidumägi: Home of Rare Plants). Coauthor with Aino Õige. Tallinn: Eesti Riiklik Kirjastus
