= List of Estonian musicals =

This is a list of Estonian-language musicals.

Name	Name in English	Author(s)	Premier (year, location)	Further info
Detektiiv Lotte	Detective Lotte			children's musical
Georg	Georg			talks about Estonian singer Georg Ots
Karlsson katuselt	Karlsson on the Roof	Tauno Aints		
Koerhaldjas Mia		Kadi Urbas		
Kuidas kuningas kuu peale kippus		Elvi Koppel	1976	based on Joachim Knauth's play
Lotte ja kadunud jõuluvana		Ain Mäeots		based on Lotte series
Mootorsaed laulsid	Chainsaws Were Singing	Sander Maran	2024, Haapsalu Horror and Fantasy Film Festival	Horror comedy film about two lovers separated by a chainsaw killer.
Pipi Pikksukk	Pippi Longstocking	Ülo Vinter and Ülo Raudmäe	1969, Estonia Theatre	
Romeo & Julia	Romeo & Julia			
Savisaar	Savisaar			talks about Estonian politician Edgar Savisaar

== See also ==
- List of Estonian plays
