= Ülo Seppa =

Estonian lawyer and agronomist (1933–2015)

Ülo Seppa (10 February 1933 in Tartu – 2015) is an Estonian lawyer and agronomist.

He was a member of Constitutional Assembly of Estonia.

In 2006, he was awarded with Order of the National Coat of Arms, V class.
