= Ülo Jaaksoo =

Estonian computer scientist

Ülo Jaaksoo (born 16 April 1939 in Mõisaküla) is an Estonian computer scientist.

In 1969, he graduated from Tallinn University of Technology in engineering.

Since 2013, he is the chairman of Supervisory Board of AS Cybernetica.

In 2004, he was awarded with Order of the White Star, III class.
