= Uus Maailm =

Subdistrict of Tallinn, Estonia

Coordinates: 59°25′32.51″N 24°44′2.52″E

- Subdistrict of Tallinn
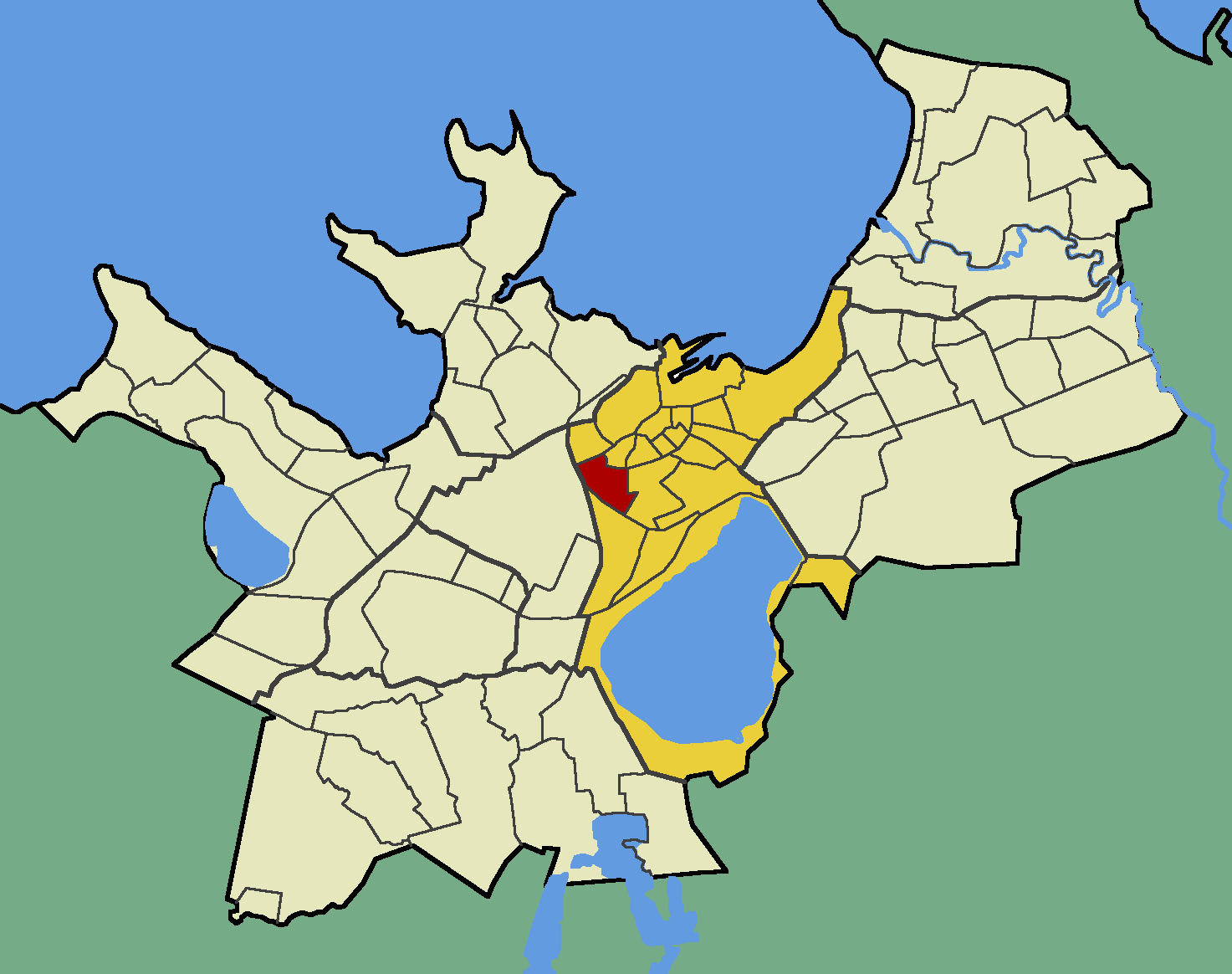
- Uus Maailm within the district of Kesklinn (Midtown).
- Country: Estonia
- County: Harju County
- City: Tallinn
- District: Kesklinn

Population (01.01.2015)
  - Total: 7,442

Uus Maailm (Estonian for "New World") is a subdistrict (asum) in the district of Kesklinn (City Centre), Tallinn, the capital of Estonia. It has a population of 7,442 (As of 1 January 2015).

The subdistrict is named in reference to several "America" streets ("Greater America", "Lesser America" and "Middle America") in the area, named after the 19th century inn called "America".

Jaan Tootsen has directed a 2011 documentary titled The New World, on life in the area.

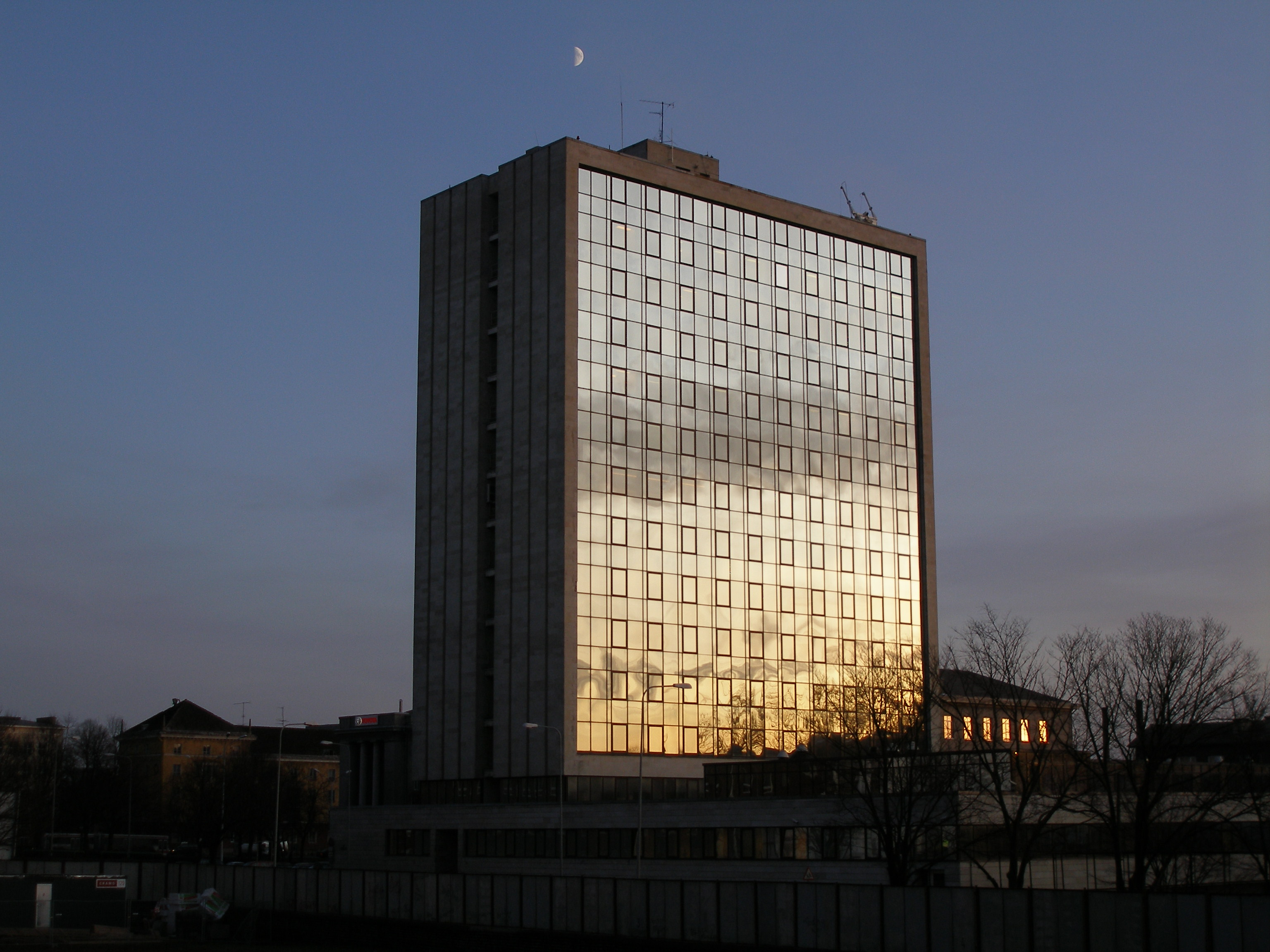
Former Estonian Ministry of Finance

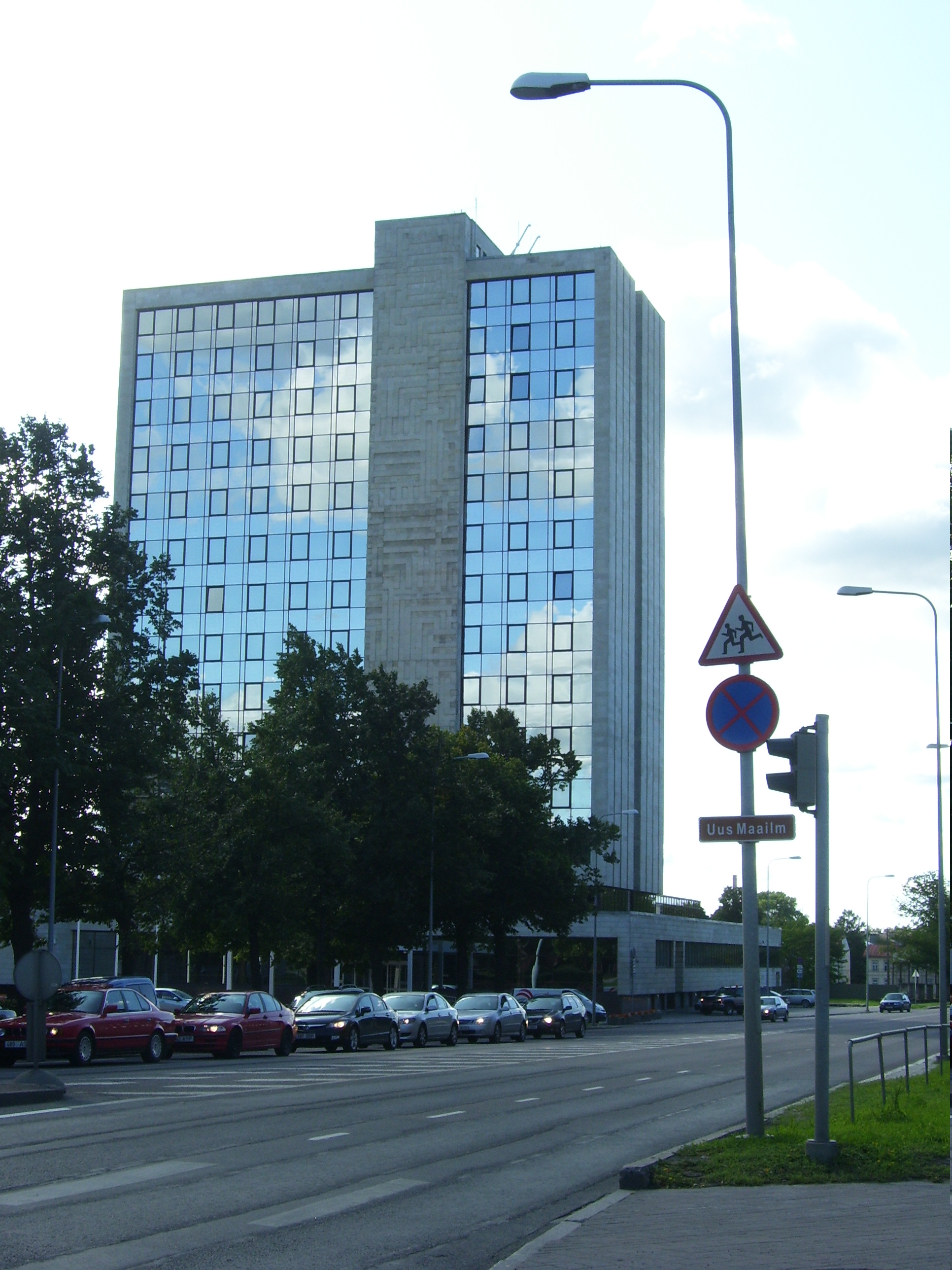
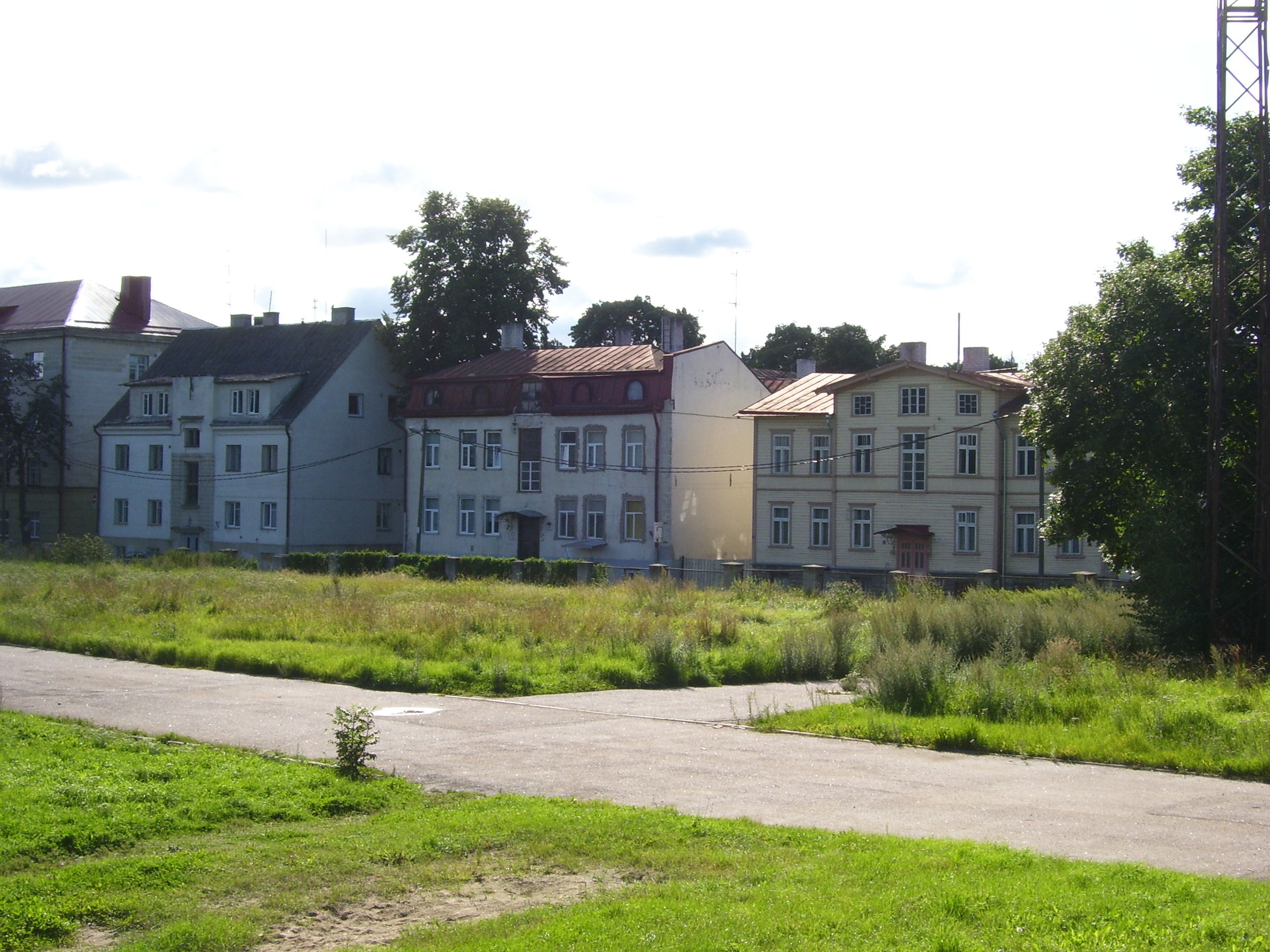

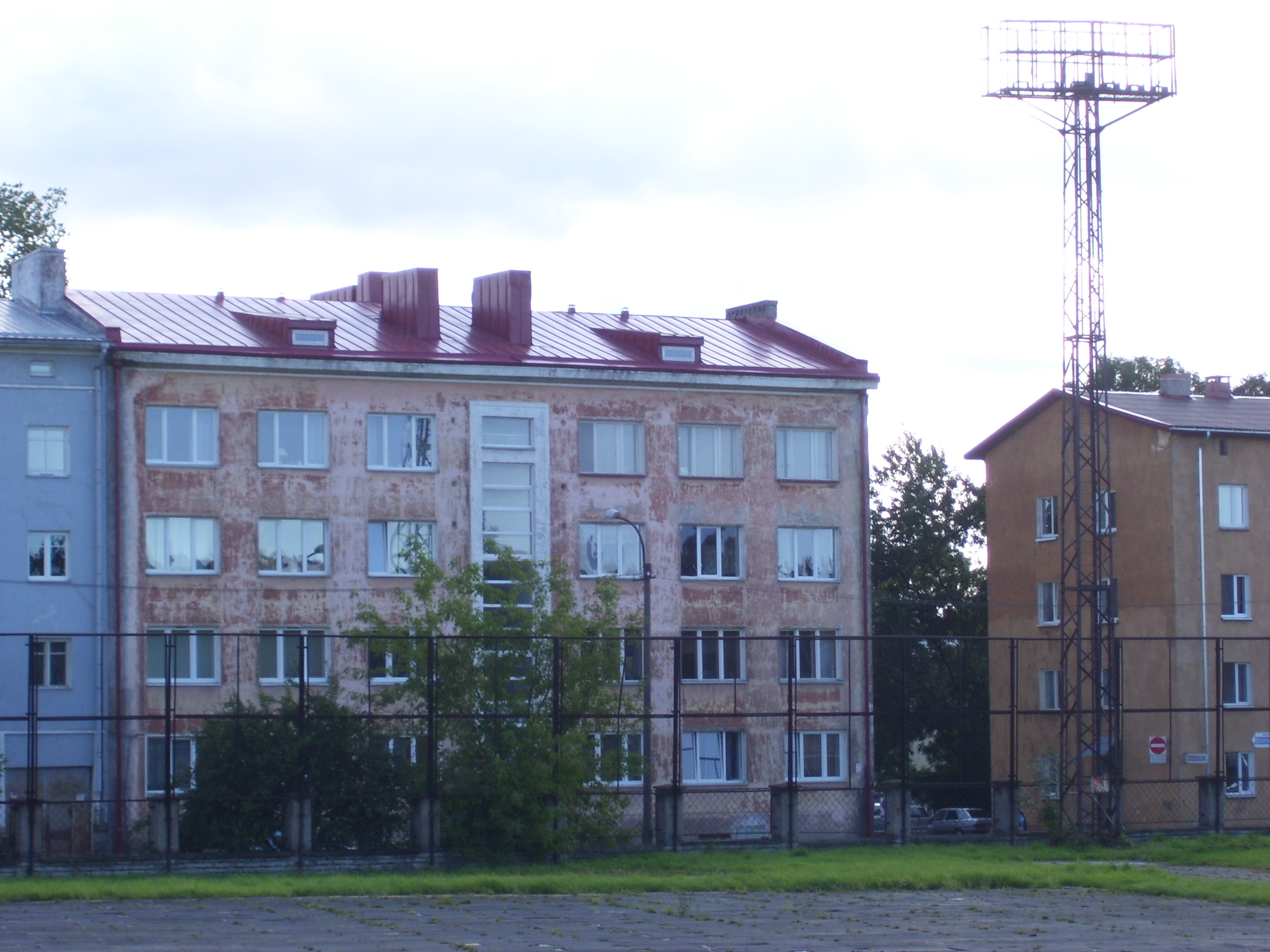

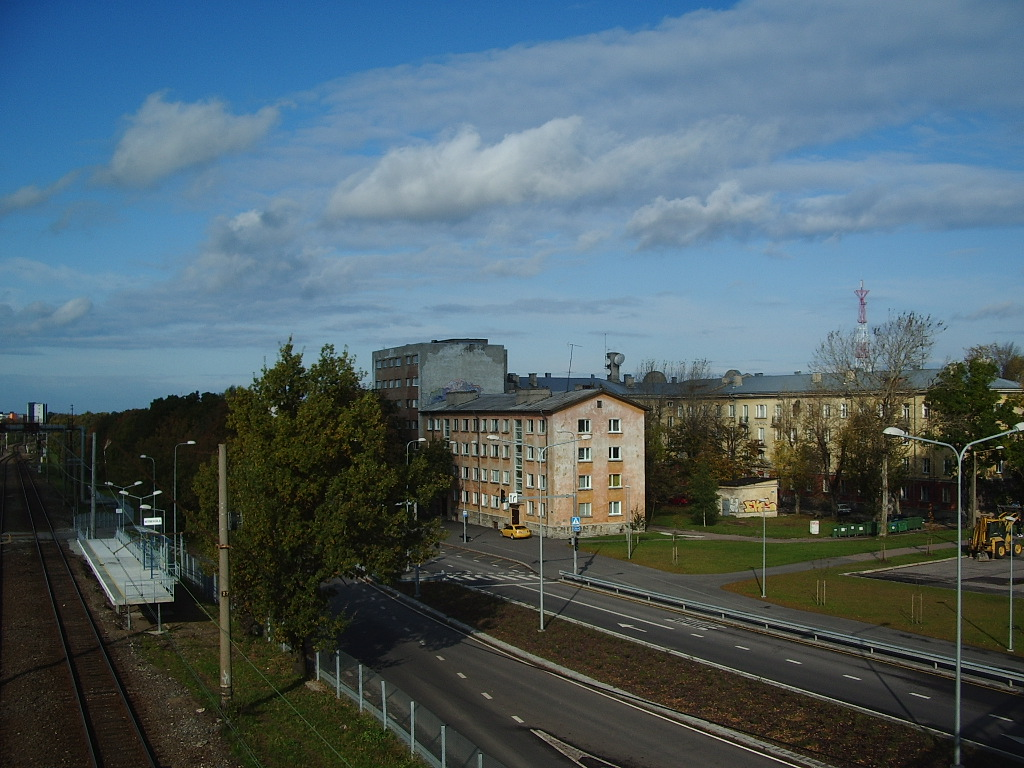
"Kitseküla" train station on Tehnika street.
