= Ülo Mander =

Estonian ecologist and geographer (born 1954)

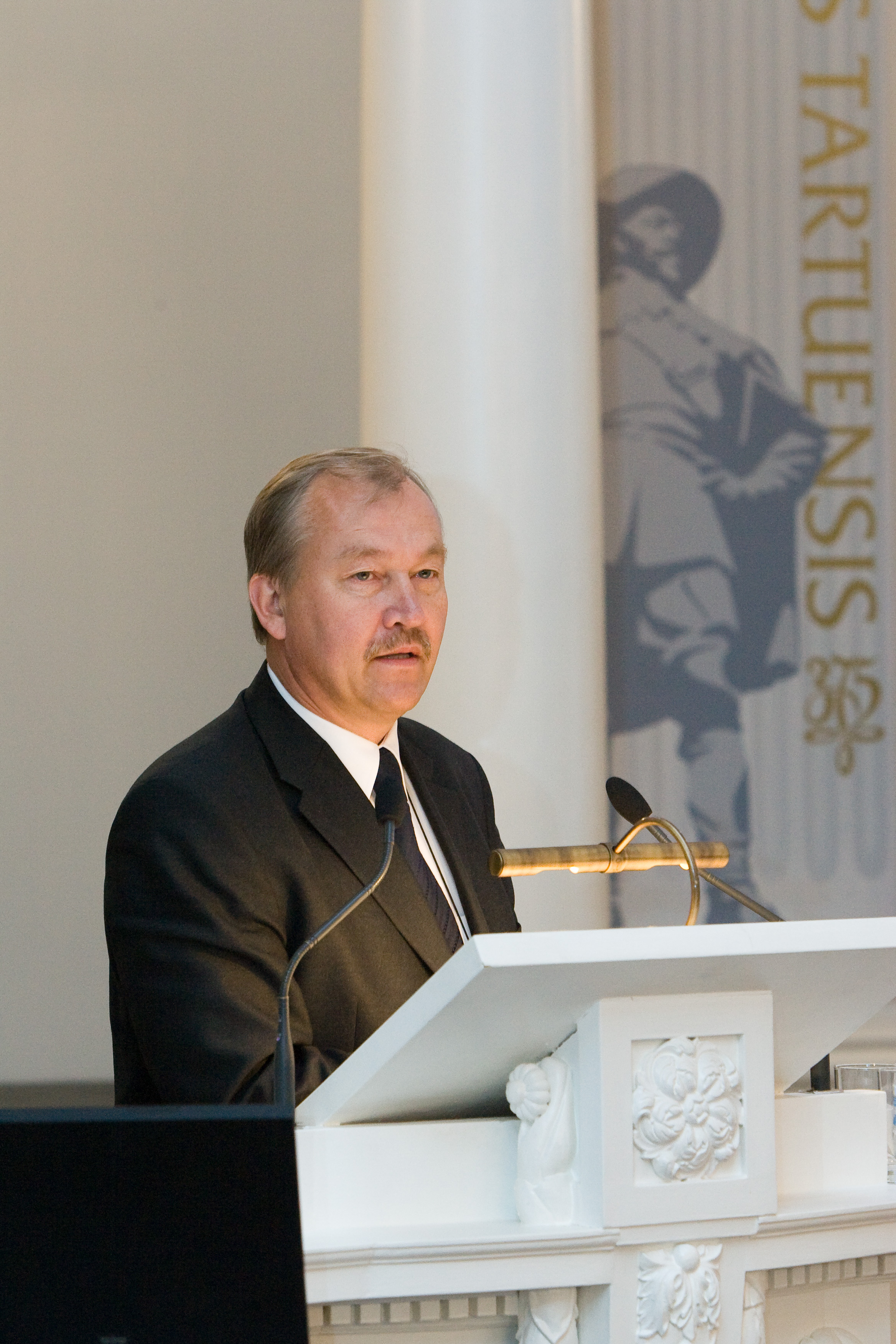
Ülo Mander

Ülo Mander (born 11 January 1954 in Tartu) is an Estonian ecologist and geographer.

In 1983, he defended his doctoral thesis at University of Tartu. He is teaching at the University of Tartu's Institute of Geography (since 1992 a professor).

1992–1998, he was the head of University of Tartu's Institute of Geography.

His primary research topics are "nutrient cycling in agricultural watersheds, nutrient retention and transformations in wetlands and riparian buffer zones, design and study of constructed wetlands for wastewater treatment, long-term changes in land-use structure and their influence on fluxes through landscape".

In 2009, he was awarded with Order of the White Star, IV class.
