= Ülo Tootsen =

Estonian politician (1933–2006)

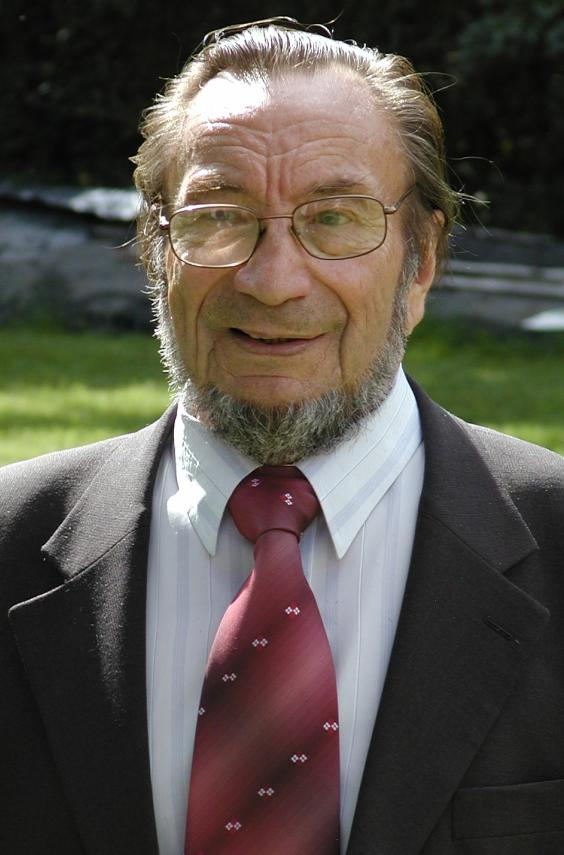
Ülo Tootsen

Ülo Tootsen (13 June 1933 – 12 March 2006) was an Estonian biologist, journalist, publisher, editor, translator, and politician. He was a member of IX Riigikogu, representing the Estonian Centre Party.

Tootsen was born in Varstu Parish (now, part of Rõuge Parish). His brother was journalist, writer and politician Toivo Tootsen. He graduated from Tartu State University in 1957 with a degree in zoology. He then worked in the Ministry of Agriculture of the Estonian SSR in from 1957 until 1959 as a chief ichthyologist. From 1959 until 1961, he was the cultural editor of the daily newspaper Rahva Hääl.

From 1961 until 1991, he worked in the news editorial office of Eesti Televisioon and worked concurrently at Võru Raadio since 1985 and as a broadcaster for Eesti Raadio. From 1991 until 1995, he published the newspaper Meelejahutaja, was the editor of the newspaper Elu from 1995 until 1996, and was an editor and head of the publications department of Võrumaa Teataja from 1996 until 1999. Tootsen has published works in the field of fish farming and journalism, and has translated fiction from the Russian language into Estonian, including works by Vladimir Mitypov, Ales Adamovich, Yevgeny Fadeitshev, Feodor Gladkov, and Ion Druță.
