= Jaan Tootsen =

Estonian film director, producer and journalist

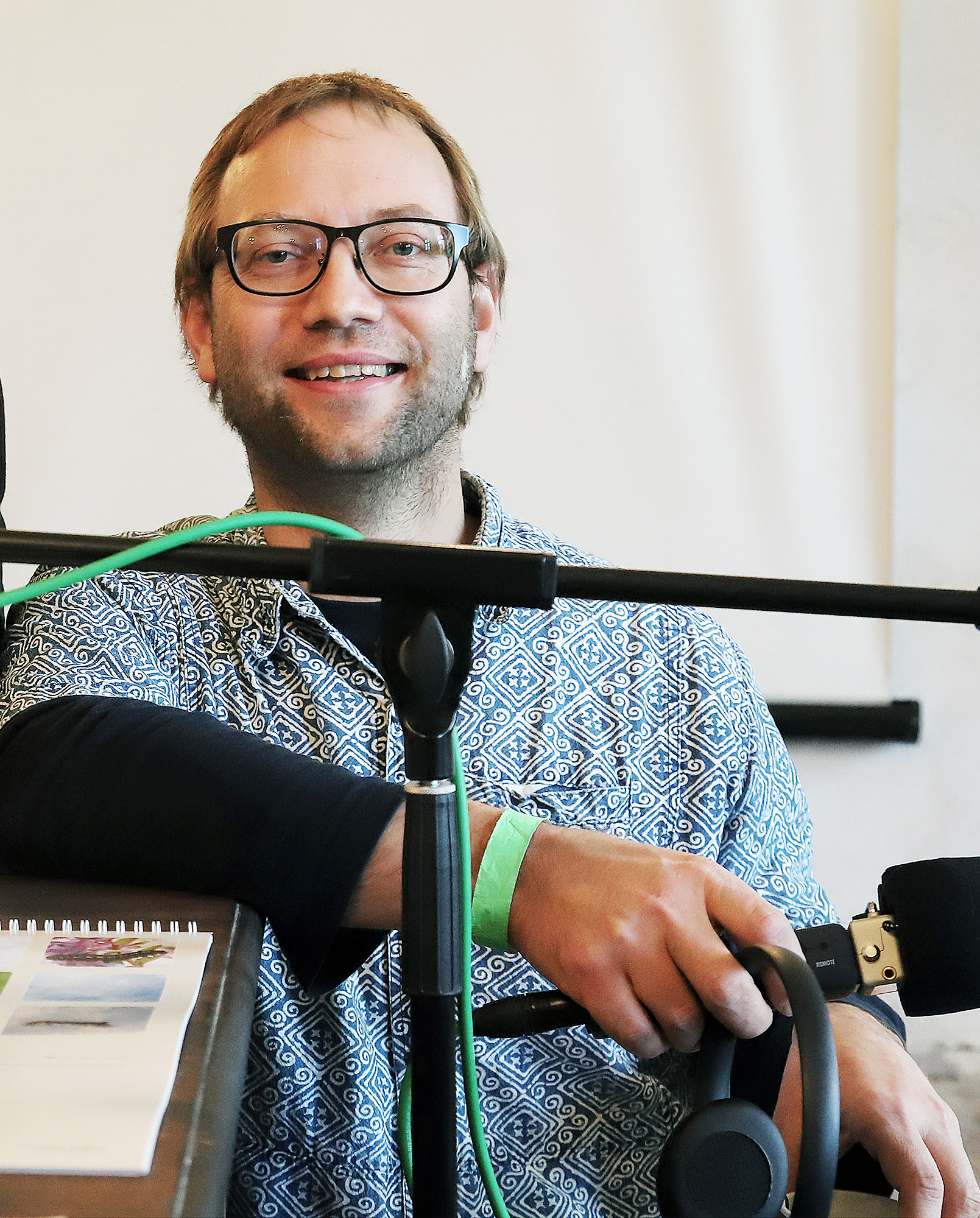
Jaan Tootsen in 2020

Jaan Tootsen (born 14 October 1975) is an Estonian Estonian film director, screenwriter and film producer.

Tootsen's father is journalist, writer and politician Toivo Tootsen. His half-brother is writer Tõnis Tootsen. Since 2000 he has worked at Estonian National Broadcasting. He has been a long-time editor of radio program "Ööülikool". 2012-2016 he was cultural advisor for Estonian president.

== Filmography ==
- 1998 Tappev Tartu (feature film)
- 2005 Avasta rikas nurgatagune kosmoses (documentary film; director)
- 2006 Hea uus ilm (documentary film; director)
- 2011 The New World (documentary film; director)
- 2013 Velosoofid (documentary film; director and producer)
- 2016 Vigala Sass - viimased lindid (documentary film; director)
- 2018 Vello Salo. Igapäevaelu müstika (documentary film; director and producer)
- 2020 Fred Jüssi. Olemise ilu (documentary film; director)
- 2024 Kikilipsuga Mässaja (documentary film; director)
