= Ülo Raudmäe =

Estonian conductor and composer

- Born: January 24, 1923
- Died: October 14, 1990 (aged 66)
- Occupations: Conductor; composer
- Instrument: Trombone

Ülo Raudmäe (until 1936 Saksberg; on 24 January 1923 Rapla – 14 October 1990 Tallinn) was an Estonian conductor, composer and trombonist.

In 1946, he graduated from Tallinn State Conservatory, specializing in trombone.

1950–1979, he played the trombone in Estonia Theatre.

Since 1972, he was a member of Estonian Composers' Union.

== Works ==
- song "Heinaveol"
- song "Vaid sulle"
- song "Maantee" (1956)
- musical "Kiri nõudmiseni"
