= Harald Laksberg =

Estonian politician (1887–1963)

Harald Alfred Johannes Laksberg (6 May 1887 – 15 August 1963) was an Estonian teacher and politician.

Laksberg was born at Tüki Manor in Tähtvere Parish (now, part of Tartu urban municipality). He graduated from the Faculty of Science of the University of Tartu in 1910 and worked as a teacher in several Tartu schools until 1919, when he became the first Minister of Education during the Estonian Provisional Government.

From 1923 he was a natural history teacher in Tartu. He had studied music privately and then at the Tartu Music School with Adele Brosse, and harmony with Heino Eller. In 1923, he was elected a teacher of acoustics, music history and aesthetics at the Tartu College of Music and the Tartu Conservatory. He completed summer courses in Berlin from 1923 to 1925. From 1927 to 1940 he was the director of the Tartu College of Music and a teacher of musicology.

Laksberg fled the Soviet reoccupation and annexation of Estonia in 1944 and settled in Germany. He died in Frankfurt in 1963, aged 76.
