= Tõnis Lukas =

Estonian politician (born 1962)

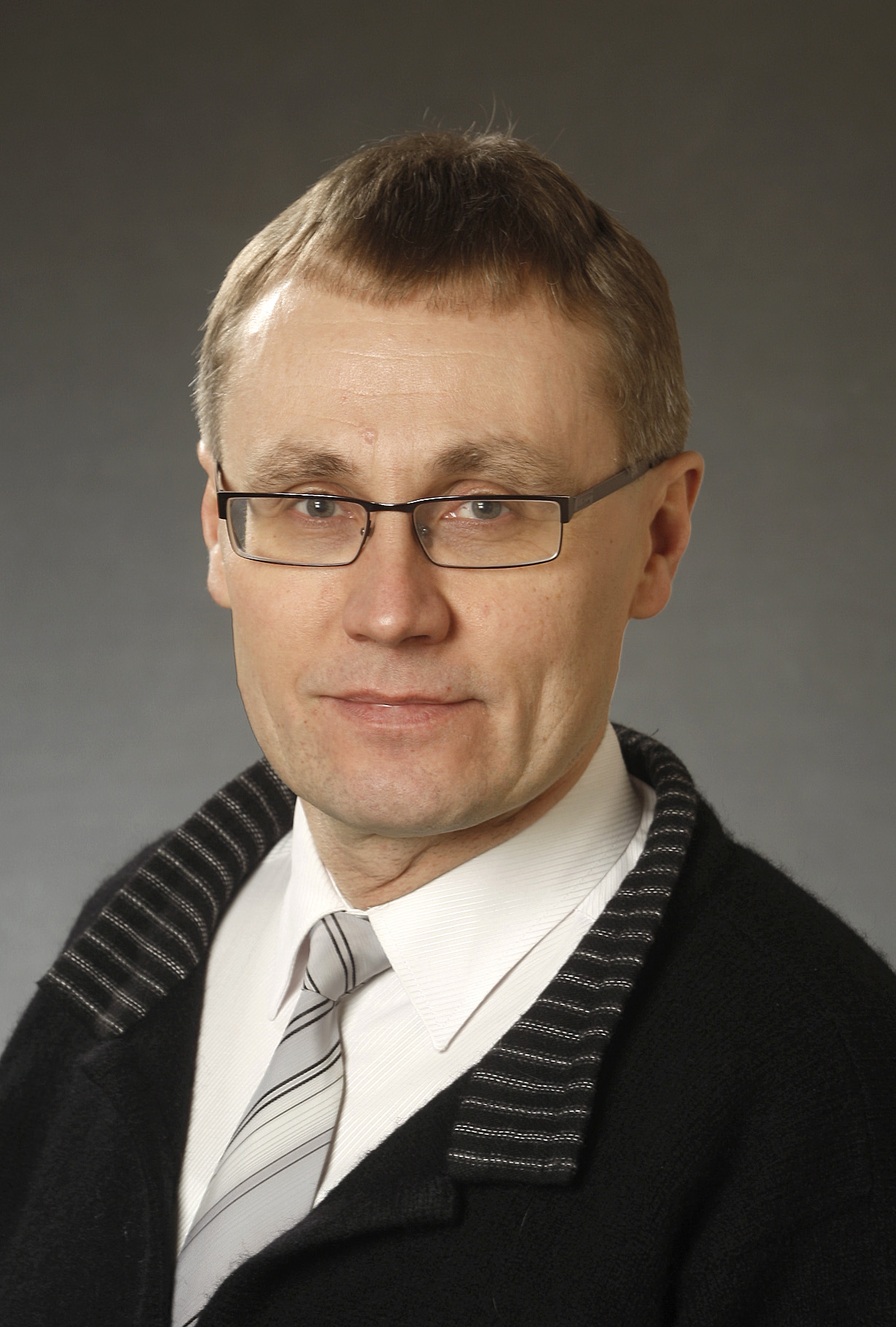

Minister of Culture
- In office 29 April 2019 – 26 January 2021
- Prime Minister: Jüri Ratas
- Preceded by: Indrek Saar
- Succeeded by: Anneli Ott

Minister of Education and Research
- In office 18 July 2022 – 17 April 2023
- Prime Minister: Kaja Kallas
- Preceded by: Liina Kersna
- Succeeded by: Kristina Kallas
- In office 5 April 2007 – 6 April 2011
- Prime Minister: Andrus Ansip
- Preceded by: Mailis Reps
- Succeeded by: Jaak Aaviksoo
- In office 25 March 1999 – 28 January 2002
- Prime Minister: Mart Laar
- Preceded by: Mait Klaassen
- Succeeded by: Mailis Reps

Mayor of Tartu
- In office 1996–1997
- Preceded by: Väino Kull
- Succeeded by: Roman Mugur

Personal details
- Born: 5 June 1962 (age 64) Tallinn, then part of Estonian SSR, Soviet Union
- Party: Pro Patria
- Education: University of Tartu

Tõnis Lukas (Estonian: [ˈtɤnʲis ˈlukːɑs]; born 5 June 1962) is an Estonian politician, former Minister of Culture from 2019 to 2021 and Minister of Education and Research from 1999 to 2002 and from 2007 to 2011.

== Early life and career ==
Lukas was born in Tallinn, Estonia. After graduating from secondary school and spending another year in technical school in Tallinn, he went on to study history at the University of Tartu. He graduated in 1987 and continued postgraduate studies from 1989 to 1992, receiving his master's degree in history 1997.

Lukas started his career as a school teacher in southern Estonia. 1989 he became a lecturer for postgraduate students at the University of Tartu. From 1992 to 1995 he worked as Director of the Estonian National Museum. Since 1995 he has held mainly political posts on both the local and national level. He briefly returned to the University of Tartu for two years in 1997 to work as a project manager and to participate in doctorate programme (still unfinished).

From 2013 to 2019 he took a break from politics, working from 2013 to 2018 again as Director of the Estonian National Museum and from 2018 to 2019 as Director of the Tartu Vocational Education Centre. He left the last post in order to serve as the Minister of Culture.

Tõnis Lukas is a member of the Estonian Vocational Education Promotion Union, Society of Friends of Estonian National Museum, Estonian Heritage Society and Learned Estonian Society. He is an author of several textbooks on history.

Tõnis Lukas is married to a literary scholar Liina Lukas. They have two daughters and a son.

== Political career ==
Lukas joined the Pro Patria Union in 1992 and was elected to Tartu City Council the next year. In 1995 he became a member of Riigikogu and served for a year as the Chairman of the Parliamentary Committee for Cultural Affairs. Tõnis Lukas left the parliament in 1996 to serve as a Mayor of Tartu (1996–1997).

After the parliamentary elections of 1999 he was appointed a Minister of Education in Prime Minister Mart Laar's cabinet on 25 March 1999. The highlight of his career as Minister was the transfer of the Ministry of Education from Tallinn to Tartu, justified as decentralisation of power and fostering regional development, while the critics see in it a result of successful lobby by University of Tartu. When the government fell on 28 January 2002 Tõnis Lukas returned to Riigikogu and was re-elected to the parliament in 2003, serving currently as a member of the Parliamentary Committee for Cultural Affairs.

After the resignation of Tunne Kelam he was elected the Chairman of Pro Patria Union on 16 April 2005. In November 2005 he unveiled plans of merger between Pro Patria Union and Union for the Republic - Res Publica. After the merger of the parties on 4 June 2006 he became one of the two co-Chairmen of the new Union of Pro Patria and Res Publica. At the party congress on 26 May 2007 Mart Laar was elected a new Chairman of the Union and Tõnis Lukas became one of the three Vice-Chairmen elected to assist Mart Laar.

From 5 April 2007 to 6 April 2011, he again served as the Minister of Education and Research. He returned to the government in April 2019, becoming the Minister of Culture in Jüri Ratas' second cabinet.
