= Mait Klaassen =

Estonian politician

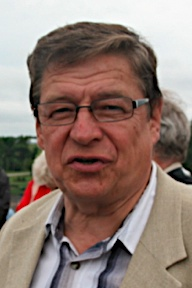
- Mait Klaassen in 2010

Minister of Education
- In office 17 March 1997 – 25 March 1999
- Prime Minister: Mart Siimann
- Preceded by: Rein Loik
- Succeeded by: Tõnis Lukas

Rector of the Estonian University of Life Sciences
- In office 2008–2022
- Preceded by: Alar Karis
- Succeeded by: Ülle Jaakma
- In office 1993–1998
- Preceded by: Olev Saveli
- Succeeded by: Henn Elmet

Personal details
- Born: 23 January 1955 (age 71) Tartu, then part of Estonian SSR, Soviet Union
- Party: Estonian Coalition Party
- Education: Estonian University of Life Sciences

Mait Klaassen (born 23 January 1955) is an Estonian politician. He was a member of the X Riigikogu and the XI Riigikogu, and served as Minister of Education from 17 March 1997 to 25 March 1999.

Klaassen was the rector of the Estonian University of Life Sciences from 1993 to 1998, and again from 2008 to 2022. He was awarded the Order of the White Star (fourth class).
