= List of mayors of Tartu =

The following is a list of mayors of Tartu, Estonia.

*	Office	Name	Political affiliation	Notes
1	1787–1788	Georg Friedrich von Kymmel		Mayor
2	1788	Johann Major		Mayor
3	1793–1796	Gerhard Wilde		Mayor
4	1877	Carl Victor Kupffer		Mayor
5	1878–1891	Georg von Oettingen		Mayor
6	1891–1898	Wilhelm Bock		Mayor
7	1898–1917	Victor von Grewingk		Mayor
8	1917	Heinrich Luht		Mayor
9	1917–1918	Jaan Kriisa		Mayor
10	1918	Egmont Brock		Mayor
11	1918–1919	Jaan Kriisa		Mayor
12	1919–1920	Ants Simm		Mayor
13	1920–1934	Karl Luik		Mayor
14	1934	Hans Ainson		Mayor
15	1934–1939	Aleksander Tõnisson		Mayor
16	1939–1940	Robert Sinka		Mayor
17	1940–1941	Kristjan Jalak	Communist Party	Chairman of Executive Committee
18	1941	Robert Sinka		Mayor
19	1941–1942	Voldemar Onton		Deputy Mayor
20	1942–1944	Karl Keerdoja		Mayor
21	1944	Joan Riismantel	Communist Party	Chairman of Executive Committee
22	1944–1945	August Prink	Communist Party	Chairman of Executive Committee
23	1945–1949	Bronislav Võrse	Communist Party	Chairman of Executive Committee
24	1949–1950	Eduard Schmidt	Communist Party	Chairman of Executive Committee
25	1950–1953	Ivan Rosental	Communist Party	Chairman of Executive Committee
26	1953	Heinrich Tiido	Communist Party	Chairman of Executive Committee
27	1953	Heinrich Ajo	Communist Party	Chairman of Executive Committee
28	1953–1957	Kaarel Kotsar	Communist Party	Chairman of Executive Committee
29	1957–1961	Martin Varik	Communist Party	Chairman of Executive Committee
30	1961–1964	Heino Sisask	Communist Party	Chairman of Executive Committee
31	22 May 1964–1973	Arnold Karu	Communist Party	Chairman of Executive Committee
32	29 June 1973–1979	Roland Ilp	Communist Party	Chairman of Executive Committee
33	26 December 1979 – 30 June 1987	Nikolai Preiman	Communist Party	Chairman of Executive Committee
34	30 June 1987 – 17 October 1991	Toomas Mendelson	Communist Party	Chairman of Executive Committee
35	21 November 1991 – 11 November 1993	Ants Veetõusme	Independent Royalist Party	Mayor
36	11 November 1993 – 31 October 1996	Väino Kull	Reform Party	Mayor
37	31 October 1996 – 3 April 1997	Tõnis Lukas	Pro Patria Union	Mayor
38	24 April 1997 – 10 September 1998	Roman Mugur		Mayor
39	10 September 1998 – 23 September 2004	Andrus Ansip	Reform Party	Mayor
40	23 September 2004 – 2 April 2007	Laine Jänes	Reform Party	Mayor
41	26 April 2007 – 26 March 2014	Urmas Kruuse	Reform Party	Mayor
41	8 April 2014 – present	Urmas Klaas	Reform Party	Mayor
