= Kriisa =

Kriisa is an Estonian surname. Notable people with the name include:

- Jaan Kriisa (1882–1942), Estonian lawyer and politician
- Kerr Kriisa (born 2001), Estonian basketball player
- Valmo Kriisa (born 1974), Estonian basketball player
