= Mailis Reps =

Estonian politician

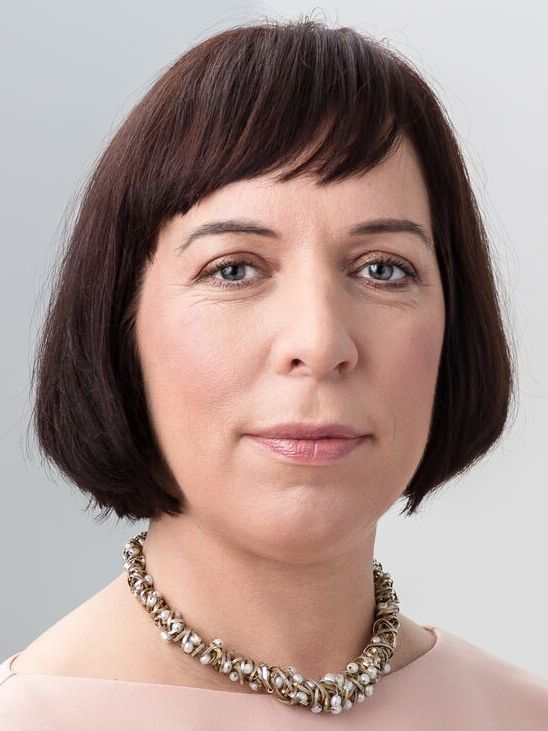
- Mailis Reps in 2017.

Minister of Education and Research
- In office 23 November 2016 – 21 November 2020
- Prime Minister: Jüri Ratas
- Preceded by: Maris Lauri
- Succeeded by: Jaak Aab
- In office 12 April 2005 – 5 April 2007
- Prime Minister: Andrus Ansip
- Preceded by: Toivo Maimets
- Succeeded by: Tõnis Lukas

Minister of Education
- In office 2002–2003
- Prime Minister: Siim Kallas
- Preceded by: Tõnis Lukas
- Succeeded by: Toivo Maimets

Personal details
- Born: 13 January 1975 (age 51) Tallinn, then part of Estonian SSR, Soviet Union
- Party: Estonian Centre Party
- Education: Tallinn University; Central European University; Maastricht University; Uppsala University

Mailis Reps (née Rand, born 13 January 1975) is an Estonian politician, a member of the Estonian Centre Party. She served as the Minister of Education and Research from 2002 to 2003, 2005 to 2007 and 2016 to 2020.

== Early life and education ==
Reps was born in Tallinn, Estonia. From 1993 to 1998 she studied law at the Academy Nord (now Tallinn University) in Tallinn. She currently holds two Master's degrees: the first in law from Central European University and the second in public relations from Maastricht University. Since 2001 she is studying international and European law at the doctoral level at Uppsala University.

From 2000 to 2001 Mailis Rand worked at the European Commission Directorate-General of Personnel and Administration. Since year 2000 she is also a lecturer of international public law in the Academy Nord and in the Riga Graduate School of Law.

== Political career ==
On 28 January 2002 Mailis Rand became the Estonian Minister of Education in the government of Siim Kallas. She was often criticised for her youth and inexperience. Although she was unable to solve several crucial problems of Estonian education, she fought for more funding to education and was elected Friend of Education by the Estonian Education Forum in October 2002. Mailis Rand renamed the Ministry of Education to the Ministry of Education and Research (in effect since 1 January 2003) to reflect the central role of this government institution in the administration of higher education and research activities.

As minister, she also merged two leading academic libraries of Estonia – Estonian Academic Library and Tallinn Pedagogical University Library. The merger was signed on 8 April 2003, 2 days before the resignation of the government.

Mailis Rand became then member of the Estonian Parliament (Riigikogu). She was also elected to the Board of the Estonian Centre Party and appointed the Party's Secretary on Foreign Relations. She was one of the persons involved in preparing the controversial contract of co-operation between the Estonian Centre Party and Russian 'party of the power' United Russia in December 2004.

After the resignation of the government of Prime Minister Juhan Parts she was appointed again Minister of Education and Research on 13 April 2005. The main priorities of her second term were the preparation of the new general curriculum, approval of the new vocational education agenda, improving and expanding learning in Estonian in the schools of Russian-speaking minority, provision of free lunches to pupils and approval of the new vocational standard for teachers.

Since 2005 she is also a Vice-Chairperson of the Estonian Centre Party.

=== Member of PACE ===
As member of the Parliamentary Assembly of the Council of Europe (PACE), Reps serves as full member of the Committee on Legal Affairs and Human Rights (as Second Vice-Chairperson); the Committee on the Election of Judges to the European Court of Human Rights; the Committee on the Honouring of Obligations and Commitments by Member States of the Council of Europe (Monitoring Committee); and the Sub-Committee on Human Rights. In late September 2014, she and fellow parliamentarian Marietta de Pourbaix-Lundin of Sweden assessed the reform agenda initiated by President Petro Poroshenko of Ukraine, reviewed the state of the armed insurgency in the east of Ukraine, and evaluated ethnic tensions in Odesa following the fire of 2 May. Alongside Jean-Claude Mignon of France, she is currently co-rapporteur on the honouring of obligations and commitments by Ukraine.

== Controversy ==
Mailis Reps was heavily criticised after her official visit to the Mari-El Republic, a federal subject of Russia in August 2005. While several European (including Estonian) politicians have drawn attention to the discrimination of Mari people in this republic and issued statements on the topic, Mailis Reps spoke very positively about the current state of native inhabitants, their culture and education in her interview to Russian television. She later claimed that her statements were taken out of context by Russian TV and that her poor knowledge of Russian contributed to misunderstanding what she had actually meant.

== Personal life ==
After marrying Latvian lawyer Agris Repšs, she started to use a simplified version of her husband's surname (Reps). The couple had six children before announcing their divorce in February 2019.

== Timeline ==
- 2002–2003 Estonian Minister of Education
- 2003–2005 Member of the Estonian Parliament (Riigikogu)
- 2003–2005 Secretary of Foreign Affairs of the Estonian Centre Party
- 2003– Member of the Board of the Estonian Centre Party
- 2005–2007 Estonian Minister of Education and Research
- 2005– Vice-Chairperson of the Estonian Centre Party
- 2007– Member of the Estonian Parliament (Riigikogu)

Political offices
Preceded by Tõnis Lukas	Minister of Education; 2002–2003	Succeeded by Toivo Maimets
Preceded by Toivo Maimets	Minister of Education and Research; 2005–2007	Succeeded by Tõnis Lukas
Preceded by Maris Lauri	Minister of Education and Research; 2016–2020	Succeeded by Jaak Aab
