= Karl Luts =

Estonian chemist and politician

Karl Friedrich Luts
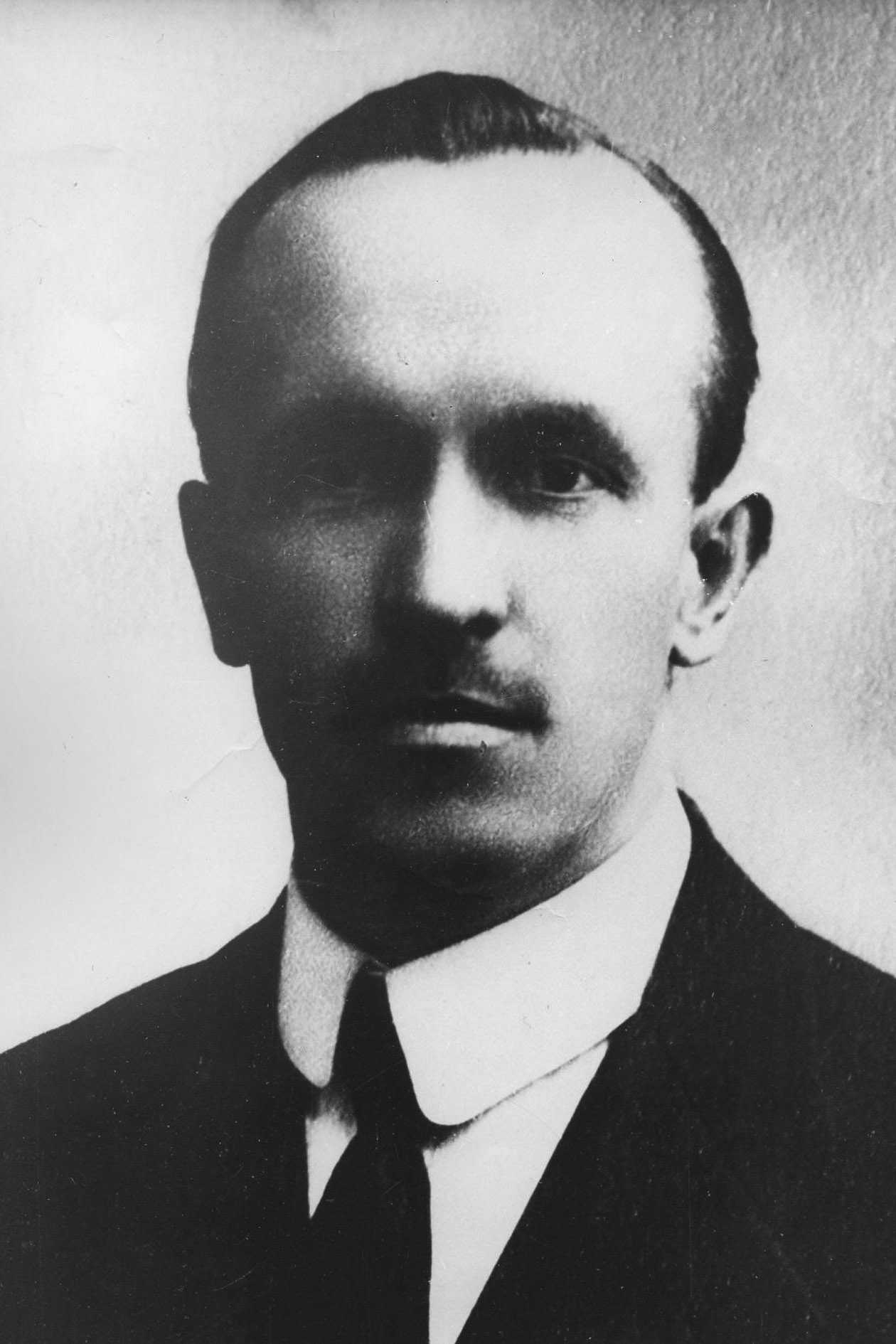
- Born: 15 November 1893; St. Petersburg, Russian Empire
- Died: 15 January 1942 (aged 48); Ussollag prison camp, Usolye, Perm Oblast, RSFSR
- Citizenship: Estonian
- Education: Imperial Saint Petersburg Institute of Technology (1905–1906); Saint Petersburg Imperial University (1907–1912)
- Known for: Research in oil shale
- Awards: Cross of Liberty VR III/1 (1920); Order of the Estonian Red Cross, 3rd class (1938)
- Scientific career
- Fields: Chemist
- Workplaces: Bekhterev Psychoneurological Institute (1912–1918); Esimene Eesti Põlevkivitööstus (1920–1941)

Karl Friedrich Luts (15 November 1883, Saint Petersburg – 15 January 1942, Usolye, Perm Oblast) was an Estonian oil shale chemist and politician.

Karl Luts was born on 15 November 1883 in St. Petersburg, Russian Empire. He studied at the St. Petersburg's St. John's Church School and in 1896–1899 he studied privately at the Craft School of the Imperial Technical School. In 1898, Karl Luts joined the St. Petersburg Estonian Students' Society where he became a member of the board. In 1905-1912, he studied at the Petersburg Imperial Institute of Technology and the Saint Petersburg Imperial University, which he graduated as a chemist. After graduation, he worked as a drawer at different factories of St Petersburg and as an assistant at the Bekhterev Psychoneurological Institute. He was one of the founders of Estonian high-school in St. Petersburg.

In 1918–1919, Karl Luts was appointed Minister of Education of the Estonian Provisional Government. However, he never took the office because at the same time he was imprisoned in Russia by the Soviet regime.

In 1920, Karl Luts moved to Kohtla-Järve and became the head of the National Laboratory of Oil Shale and the Kohtla oil-shale factory at the State Oil Shale Industry of Estonia.

There is a street in Kohtla-Järve named after Karl Luts.

Political offices
| Preceded by Peeter Põld | Estonian Minister of Education; 1918–1919 | Succeeded by Harald Laksberg |
