= Tähtvere Parish =

Former municipality of Estonia

Tähtvere Parish Tähtvere vald
- Former municipality of Estonia
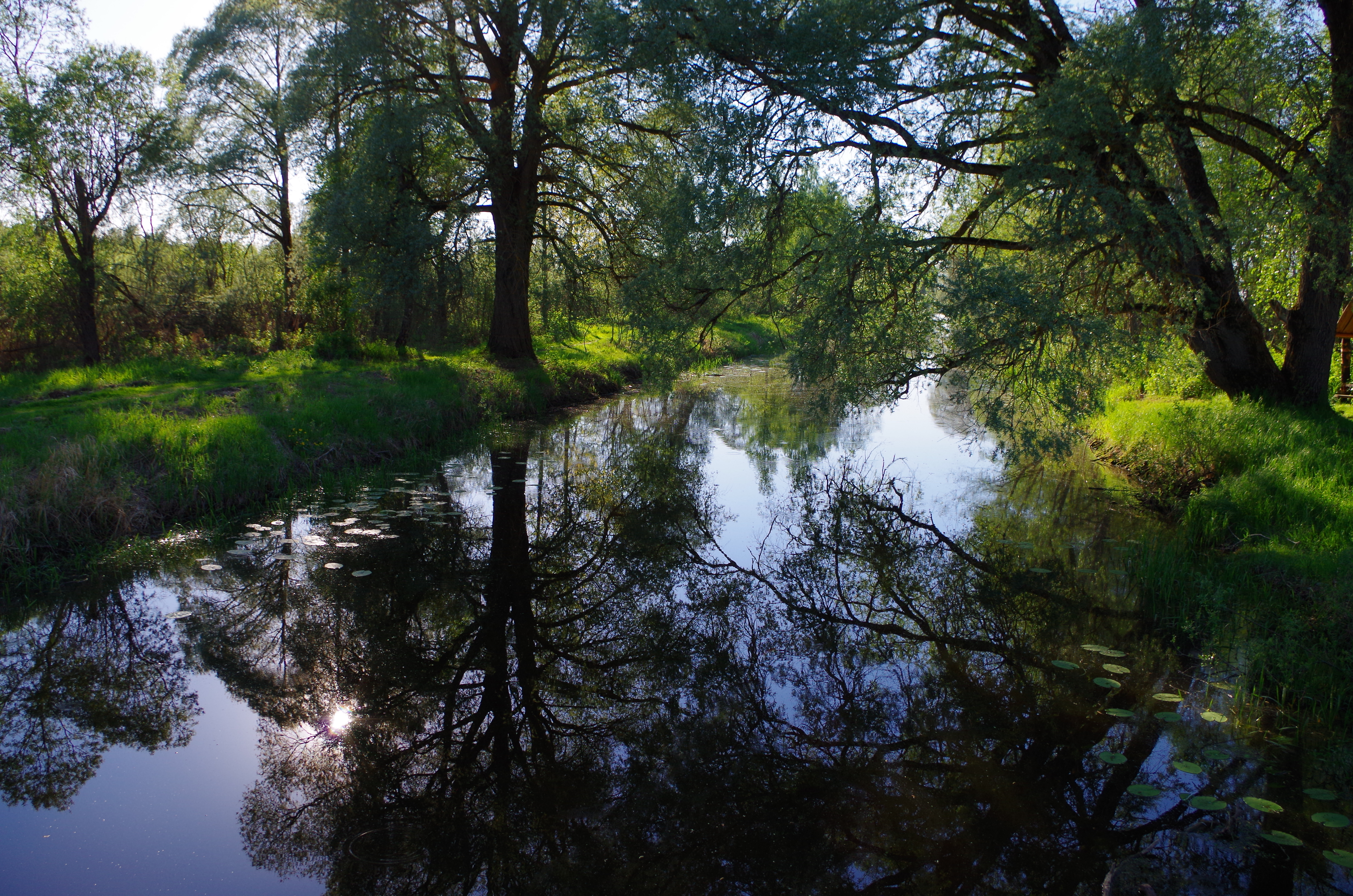
- Ilmatsalu river

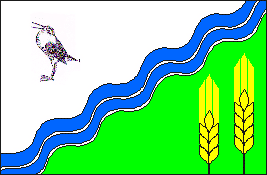
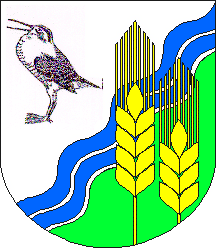
- Flag Coat of arms

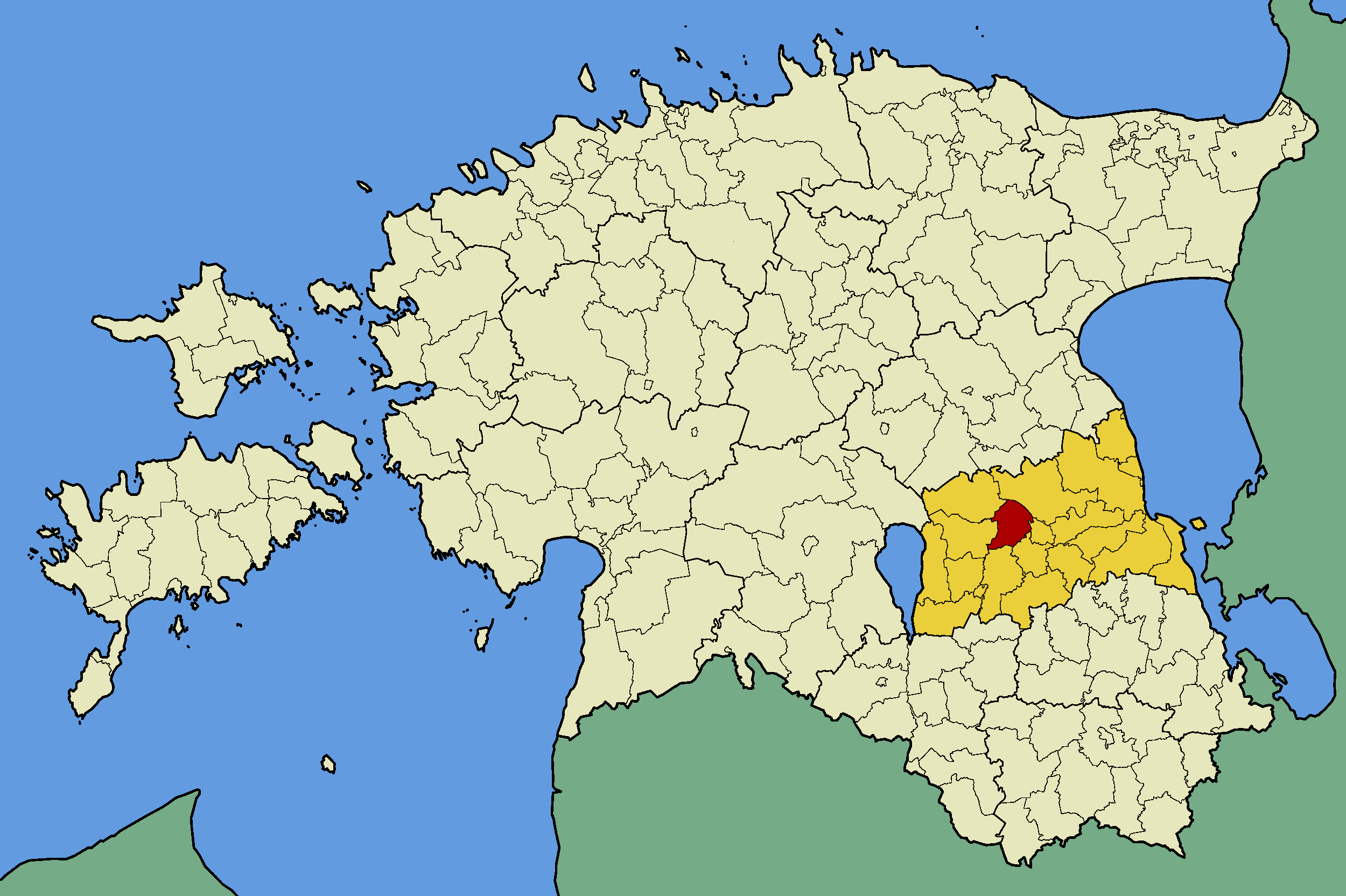
- Tähtvere Parish within Tartu County.
- Coordinates: 58°23′N 026°34′E
- Country: Estonia
- County: Tartu County
- Administrative centre: Ilmatsalu

Tähtvere Parish was a rural municipality in Tartu County, Estonia. In 2017, it was merged into Tartu City municipality.

== Settlements ==
Small boroughs

Ilmatsalu - Märja

Villages

Haage - Ilmatsalu - Kandiküla - Kardla - Pihva - Rahinge - Rõhu - Tähtvere - Tüki - Vorbuse

== Twinnings ==
- Joutsa, Finland
