= Georg Friedrich von Kymmel =

Baltic German merchant and politician

Mayor of Tartu
- In office 1787–1788
- Preceded by: Position established
- Succeeded by: Johann Major

Personal details
- Born: 18 September 1749 Mitau, Russian Empire (modern-day Jelgava, Latvia)
- Died: 13 March 1829 (aged 79) Dorpat, Russian Empire (modern-day Tartu, Estonia)

Georg Friedrich von Kymmel (18 September 1749 in Mitau, Russian Empire (modern-day Jelgava, Latvia) – 13 March 1829 in Dorpat, Russian Empire (modern-day Tartu, Estonia)) was a Baltic German merchant and politician who was the first mayor of Tartu, then known as Dorpat.

From 1764 to 1772, he studied with D. Bruno & Palm in Riga. By August 1775, he was a merchant and lived in Dorpat, and together with his brother Gottlieb founded the company Gebrüder Kymmel. By 1781, von Kymmelbecame the Docksman of the Great Guild of Tartu, and by 1786 was its alderman. From 1787 to 1788, he was the mayor of Dorpat, as well as chairman of the debtors' court. He became the first mayor of Dorpat during the Russo-Swedish War. He was succeeded in the mayoralty by Johann Major. From 1791 to 1805, he became the owner of Vaiatu Manor (Somel, now in Jõgeva Parish), and was later, from 1816 to 1827, the owner of Kabina Manor (in what is now Luunja Parish). He died in 1829.

== See also ==
- List of mayors of Tartu
