= Kandiküla =

Village in Estonia

- village
- Location in Estonia
- Coordinates: 58°23′04″N 26°39′05″E
- Country: Estonia
- County: Tartu County
- Municipality: Tartu urban municipality

Population (31.12.2010)
  - Total: 98

Kandiküla is a village in Tartu urban municipality, Tartu County, Estonia. It is located just west of the city of Tartu, behind the Tartu ring road (part of E263). Kandiküla has a population of 98 (as of 31 December 2010).

Prior to the 2017 administrative reform of local governments, Kandiküla was located in Tähtvere Parish.
