= Peeter Põld =

Estonian pedagogic scientist and politician

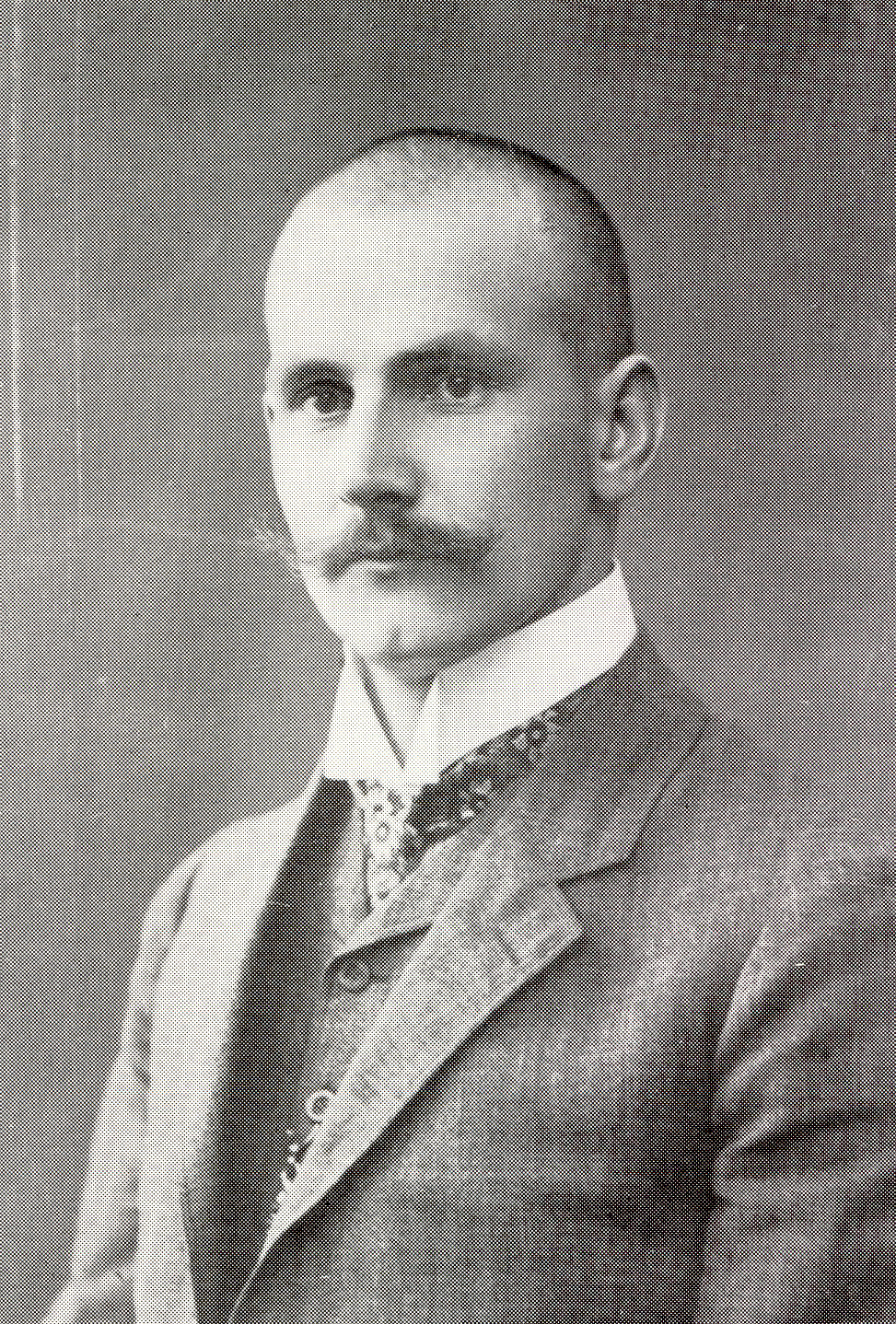
- Born: July 12, 1878; Puru, Estonia
- Died: September 1, 1930 (aged 52); Tartu, Estonia
- Occupations: Educator, politician

Peeter Siegfried Nikolaus Põld (12 July 1878 Puru, Wierland County – 1 September 1930) was an Estonian pedagogy specialist, school director, and politician (member of the Estonian People's Party), and the first Estonian Minister of Education. He was born in Puru, Kreis Wierland, Governorate of Estonia. As the curator of the University of Tartu (1918–1925), he oversaw the university's transition to instruction in Estonian in the newly independent country.

Political offices
Preceded by none	Estonian Minister of Education; 24 February 1918 – 28 November 1918	Succeeded by Karl Luts
