= Minister of Education and Research (Estonia) =

The Minister of Education and Research is the senior minister at the Ministry of Education and Research (Estonian: Eesti Vabariigi Haridus- ja Teadusministeerium) in the Estonian Government. The Minister is responsible for administration and development of Estonian educational system as well as for administration and funding of research and development activities on national level.

The Minister of Education and Research is chosen by the Prime Minister as a part of the government. The current Minister of Education and Research is Tõnis Lukas, who took the position on 18 July 2022.

The Minister is assisted in his/her work by the Deputy Minister, Secretary General, Secretary for General and Vocational Education, Secretary for Higher Education and Research, and Secretary for Youth Affairs and Foreign Relations.

== History ==
Post of the Minister of Education was created at the birth of independent Republic of Estonia on 24 February 1918. From 1928 to 1936 the official title was the Minister of Education and Social Affairs. The end of the Republic of Estonia on 21 June 1940 marked also the end of independent governance of education in Estonia. The Ministry of Education continued from 1940 to 1991 under orders received from Moscow and was merged with the Educational Committee in 1988.

The Ministry of Education was re-established in 1989 to replace the Educational Committee of the Estonian Soviet Socialist Republic. With the restoration of independent Republic of Estonia on 20 August 1991 the Ministry regained its supreme authority on educational issues. In 1993 the ministries of culture and education were merged to form Ministry of Culture and Education. 1996 the old order was restored and a separate Ministry of Education re-established. 2001 the Ministry was relocated to Tartu due to several economic and regional political arguments, but also due to successful lobby by University of Tartu.

On 1 January 2003 the Ministry of Education was renamed to Ministry of Education and Research in order to reflect better its focus and areas of administration. The title of the Minister has changed according to the changes in the name of the Ministry.

== Titles ==
- 1918-1928 : Minister of Education
- 1928-1940 : Minister of Education and Social Affairs
- 1940-1989 : Inexistant
- 1989-1992 : Minister of Education
- 1982-1996 : Minister of Culture and Education
- 1996-2003 : Minister of Education
- Since 2003 : Minister of Education and Research

== List of ministers ==
=== 1918 to 1940 ===
| | Name | Took office | Left office | Party |
| 1 | Peeter Põld | 24 February 1918 | 28 November 1918 | Estonian People's Party |
| 2 | Karl Luts | 28 November 1918 | 12 March 1919 |
| 3 | Harald Laksberg | 12 March 1919 | 9 May 1919 |
| 4 | Johannes Kartau | 9 May 1919 | 19 November 1919 |
| 5 | Konstantin Treffner | 19 November 1919 | 2 August 1920 |
| 6 | Friedrich Sauer | 2 August 1920 | 27 October 1920 |
| 7 | Jüri Annusson | 27 October 1920 | 27 January 1921 |
| 8 | Heinrich Bauer | 27 January 1921 | 22 November 1922 |
| 9 | Aleksander Veiderman | 22 November 1922 | 20 February 1924 |
| 10 | Rudolf Georg Gabrel (acting) | 20 February 1924 | 27 March 1924 |
| 11 | Hugo Bernhard Rahamägi | 27 March 1924 | 17 December 1925 |
| 12 | Jaan Lattik | 17 December 1925 | 10 December 1927 |
| 13 | Alfred Julius Mõttus | 10 December 1927 | 5 December 1928 |
| 14 | Leopold Johannes Johanson | 5 December 1928 | 10 June 1929 |
| 15 | Jaan Hünerson | 10 June 1929 | 12 February 1931 |
| 16 | Jaan Piiskar | 12 February 1931 | 20 February 1932 |
| 17 | Jaan Hünerson (2nd time) | 20 February 1932 | 3 October 1932 |
| 18 | Hugo Kukke | 3 October 1932 | 18 May 1933 |
| 19 | Konstantin Konik | 18 May 1933 | 21 October 1933 |
| 20 | Nikolai Kann | 21 October 1933 | 11 May 1936 |
| 21 | Aleksander Jaakson | 11 May 1936 | 12 October 1939 |
| 22 | Paul Kogerman | 12 October 1939 | 21 June 1940 |

=== 1989 to present ===
| | Name | Took office | Left office | Party |
| 23 | Rein Loik | 28 December 1989 | 21 October 1992 | (none) |
| 24 | Paul-Eerik Rummo | 22 October 1992 | 21 June 1994 | (none) |
| 25 | Peeter Olesk | 21 June 1994 | 17 April 1995 | Estonian National Independence Party |
| 26 | Peeter Kreitzberg | 17 April 1995 | 6 November 1995 | Estonian Centre Party |
| 27 | Jaak Aaviksoo | 6 November 1995 | 30 November 1996 | Estonian Reform Party |
| 28 | Rein Loik (2nd time) | 30 November 1996 | 17 March 1997 | (none) |
| 29 | Mait Klaassen | 17 March 1997 | 25 March 1999 | Estonian Coalition Party |
| 30 | Tõnis Lukas | 25 March 1999 | 28 January 2002 | Pro Patria Union |
| 31 | Mailis Rand | 28 January 2002 | 10 April 2003 | Estonian Centre Party |
| 32 | Toivo Maimets | 10 April 2003 | 13 April 2005 | Union for the Republic - Res Publica |
| 33 | Mailis Reps (= Mailis Rand, 2nd time) | 13 April 2005 | 5 April 2007 | Estonian Centre Party |
| 34 | Tõnis Lukas (2nd time) | 5 April 2007 | 5 April 2011 | Union of Pro Patria and Res Publica |
| 35 | Jaak Aaviksoo (2nd time) | 6 April 2011 | 26 March 2014 | Union of Pro Patria and Res Publica |
| 35 | Jevgeni Ossinovski | 26 March 2014 | 9 April 2015 | Social Democratic Party |
| 35 | Jürgen Ligi | 9 April 2015 | 12 September 2016 | Estonian Reform Party |
| 36 | Maris Lauri | 12 September 2016 | 23 November 2016 | Estonian Reform Party |
| 37 | Mailis Reps (= Mailis Rand, 3rd time) | 23 November 2016 | 21 November 2020 | Estonian Centre Party |
| 38 | Jaak Aab | 25 November 2020 | 26 January 2021 | Estonian Centre Party |
| 39 | Liina Kersna | 26 January 2021 | 18 July 2022 | Estonian Reform Party |
| 40 | Tõnis Lukas (3rd time) | 18 July 2022 | 17 April 2023 | Pro Patria |
| 41 | Kristina Kallas | 17 April 2023 | Incumbent | Estonia 200 |
