= Alfred Julius Mõttus =

Estonian politician (1886–1942)

Alfred Julius Mõttus (12 September 1886 – 4 October 1942 Sosva, Sverdlovsk Oblast, Russia) was an Estonian politician.

From 1927 to 1928 he was Minister of Education.
