= Märja =

Borough in Estonia

- Small borough
- Location within Estonia
- Coordinates: 58°21′27″N 26°38′55″E
- Country: Estonia
- County: Tartu County
- Municipality: Tartu urban municipality

Population (2011)
  - Total: 691
- Time zone: UTC+2 (EET)
  - Summer (DST): UTC+3 (EEST)

Märja is a small borough (alevik), in Tartu urban municipality, Tartu County in eastern Estonia. Prior to the 2017 administrative reform of local governments, it was located in Tähtvere Parish.
