= Juhan Kartau =

Estonian politician (1883–1964)

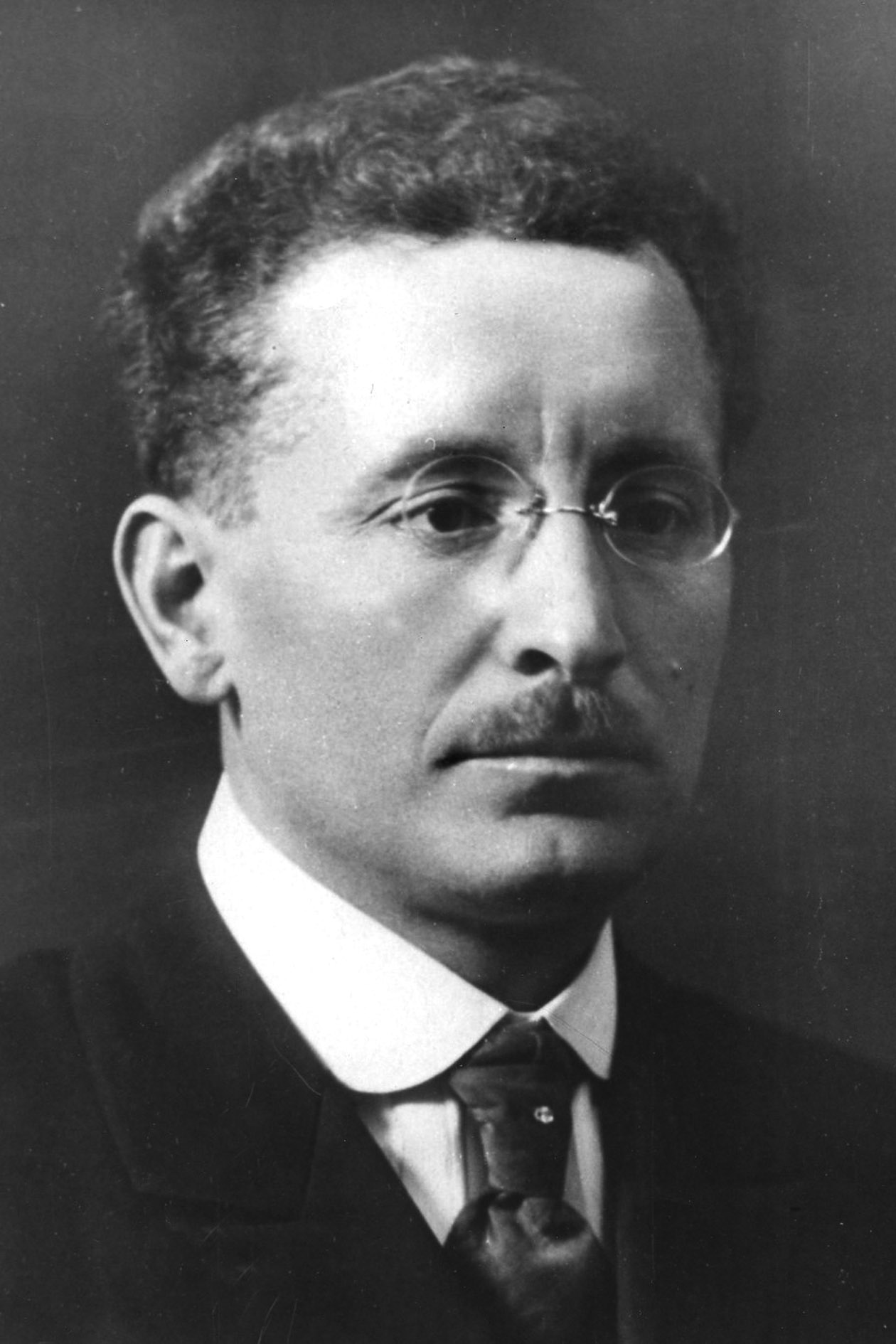
Juhan Kartau

Juhan Kartau (also Johannes Kartau; 24 August 1883 in Uderna – 24 January 1964 in Jundiaí, Brazil) was an Estonian politician. He was a member of the Asutav Kogu. In 1919, he was the Minister of Education, and in 1928, he emigrated to Brazil.
