= Estonian University of Life Sciences =

University in Tartu, Estonia

- Eesti Maaülikool
- Logo of the Estonian University of Life Sciences.
- Other names: EMÜ
- Former names: Eesti Põllumajandusülikool; Eesti Põllumajanduse Akadeemia
- Type: Public
- Established: 1951; 75 years ago
- Rector: Ülle Jaakma
- Academic staff: 506
- Total staff: 1,076
- Students: 2,931
- Undergraduates: 1,325^{a}
- Postgraduates: 803
- Doctoral students: 198
- Other students: 605^{b}
- Location: Tartu, Estonia; 58.388503845112346°N 26.696839253440597°E
- Campus: Urban
- Website: www.emu.ee
- ^{a} Including professional higher education.^{b} Integrated bachelor's and master's studies

The Estonian University of Life Sciences (Estonian: Eesti Maaülikool, EMÜ) is a public university located in Tartu, Estonia. Its roots trace back to 1802 when the Chair of Agriculture was founded in the University of Tartu. EMÜ is the fourth largest public university in Estonia.

EMÜ is, by its own claim, the only university in Estonia whose priorities in academic and research activities provide the sustainable development of natural resources necessary for the existence of Man as well as the preservation of heritage and habitat. EMÜ is a centre of research and development in such fields as agriculture, forestry, animal science, veterinary science, rural life and economy, food science and environmentally friendly technologies. The university is a member of the BOVA university network.

The university is ranked among the top 100 universities in the world in the fields of agriculture and forestry.

== Institutes ==
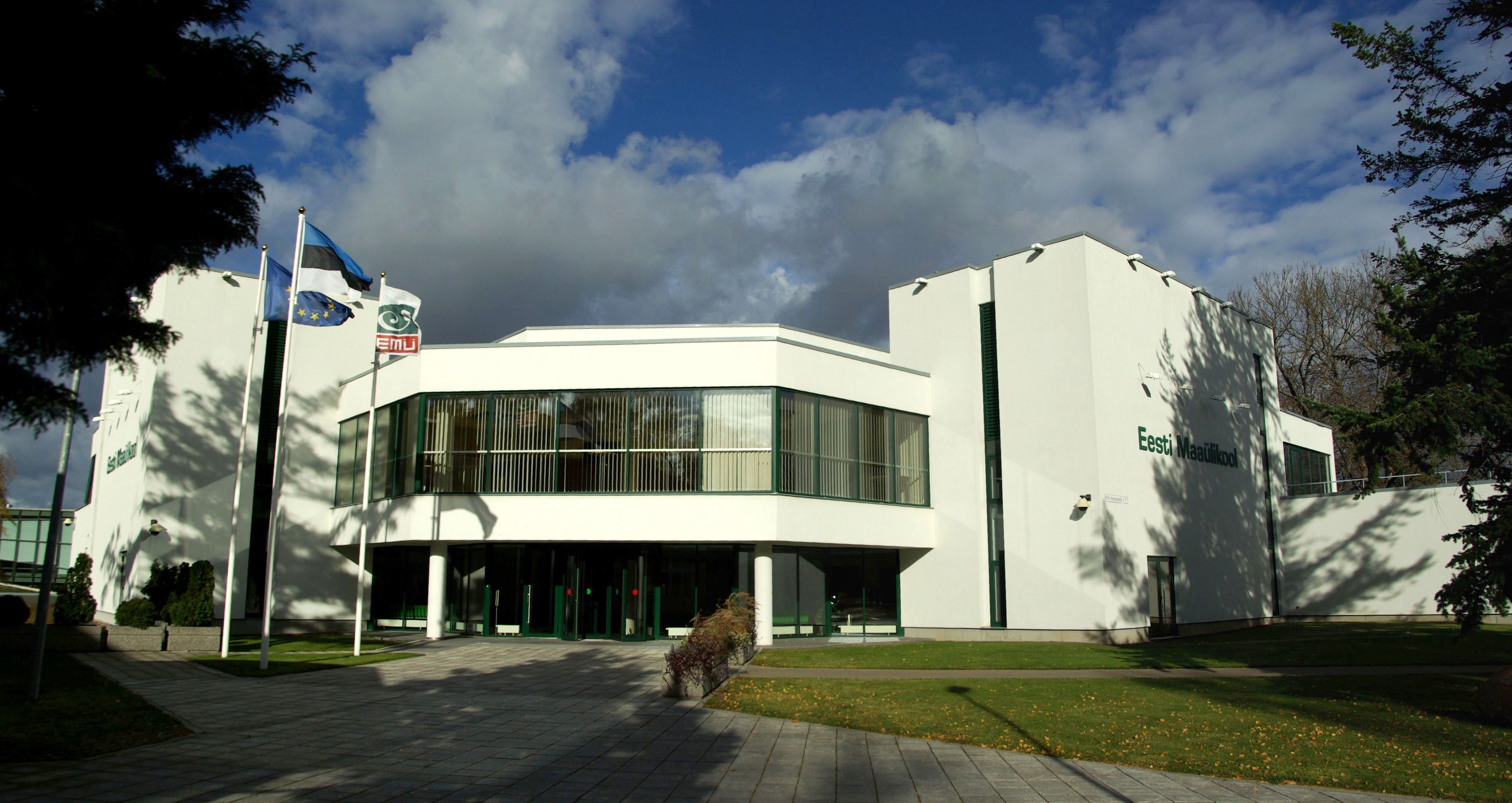
The main building of the university

As of 1 January 2022, teaching and research are carried out in three institutes:

- Institute of Agricultural and Environmental Sciences
- Institute of Forestry and Engineering
- Institute of Veterinary Medicine and Animal Sciences

Prior to reform (in 2005–2022), the university's academic structure included:

- Institute of Agricultural and Environmental Sciences
- Institute of Veterinary Medicine and Animal Sciences
- Institute of Forestry and Rural Engineering
- Institute of Technology
- Institute of Economics and Social Sciences.

== History ==
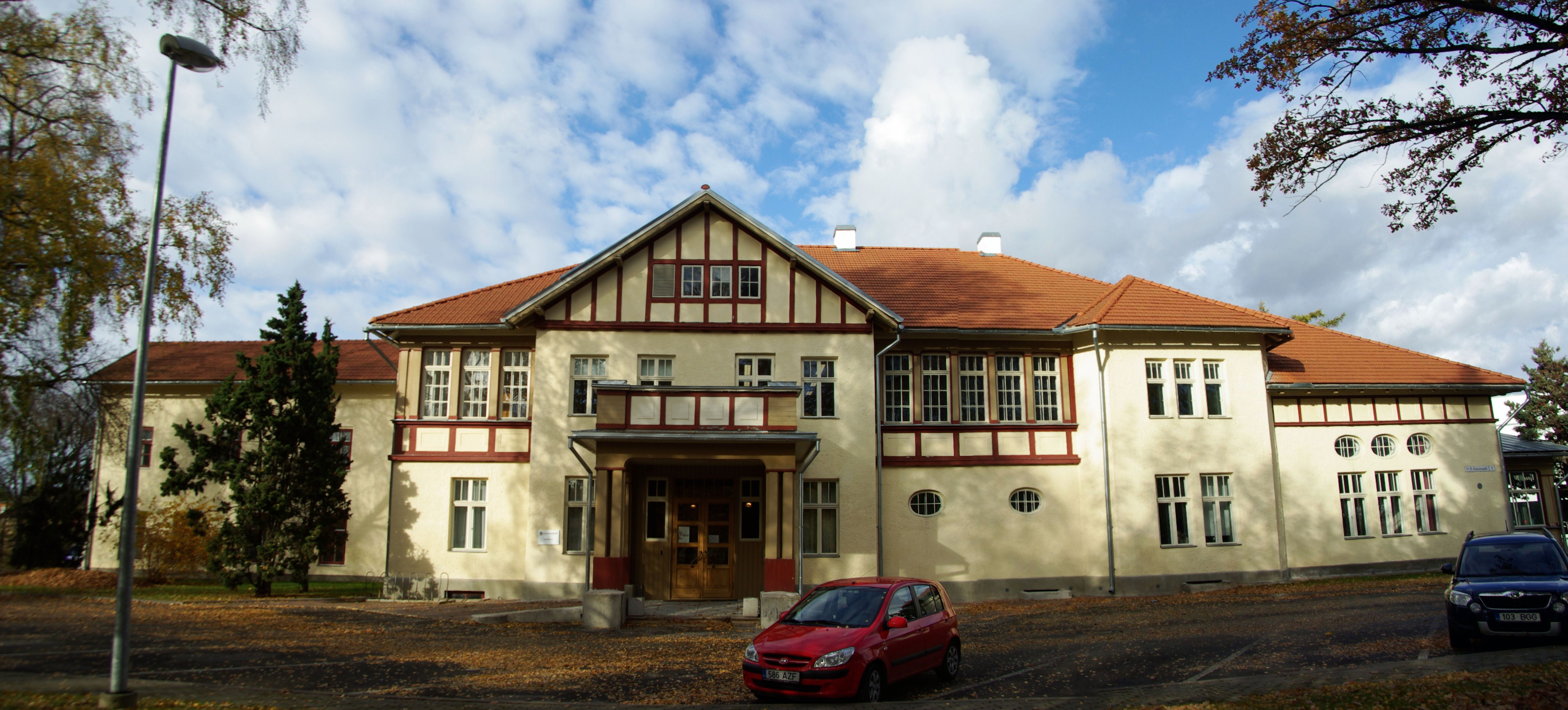
Tähtvere manor, which is owned by the university

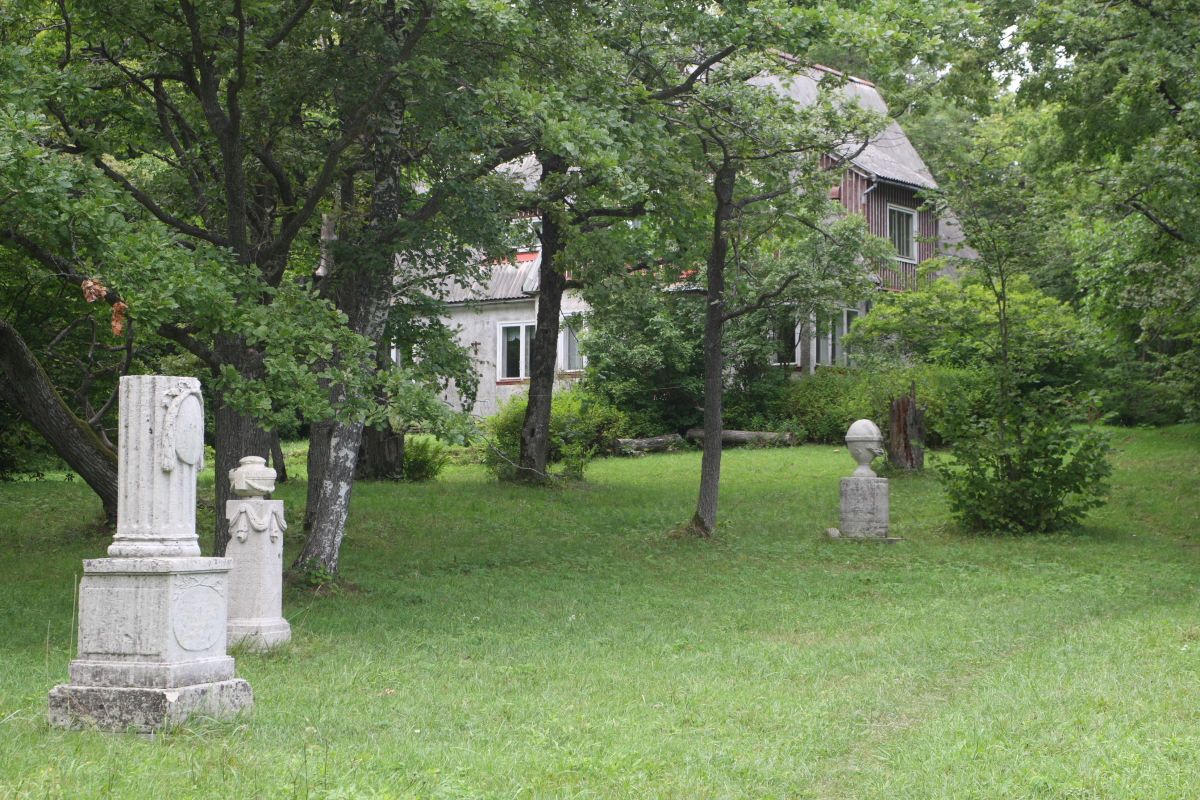
A view of the Puhtu Biological Station

The roots of EMÜ are in the agricultural and forestry education and research carried out at the University of Tartu. At the opening celebration of the university in 1632, Johan Skytte, the Swedish chancellor and practical founder of the university, said that wished that "even the peasants of this country could get their share of the watering springs of educational wealth." This statement is taken to be the beginning of agricultural education in Estonia.

After the reopening of Tartu University in 1802, a Chair of Agriculture was founded under Prof. Johann Wilhelm Krause. Initially agronomy was taught in the Faculty of Philosophy, later in the Faculty of Physics and Mathematics. This school was well-known in Europe and Russia. When Tartu opened as an Estonian university in 1919, a Faculty of Agriculture, consisting of the Departments of Agronomy and Forestry, was founded. Experimental stations and trial plots, where students could undertake research work, also belonged to the faculty. A Faculty of Veterinary Science was founded based on the older Tartu Veterinary Institute. These two faculties formed the core of an independent university in 1951, the Estonian Agricultural Academy.

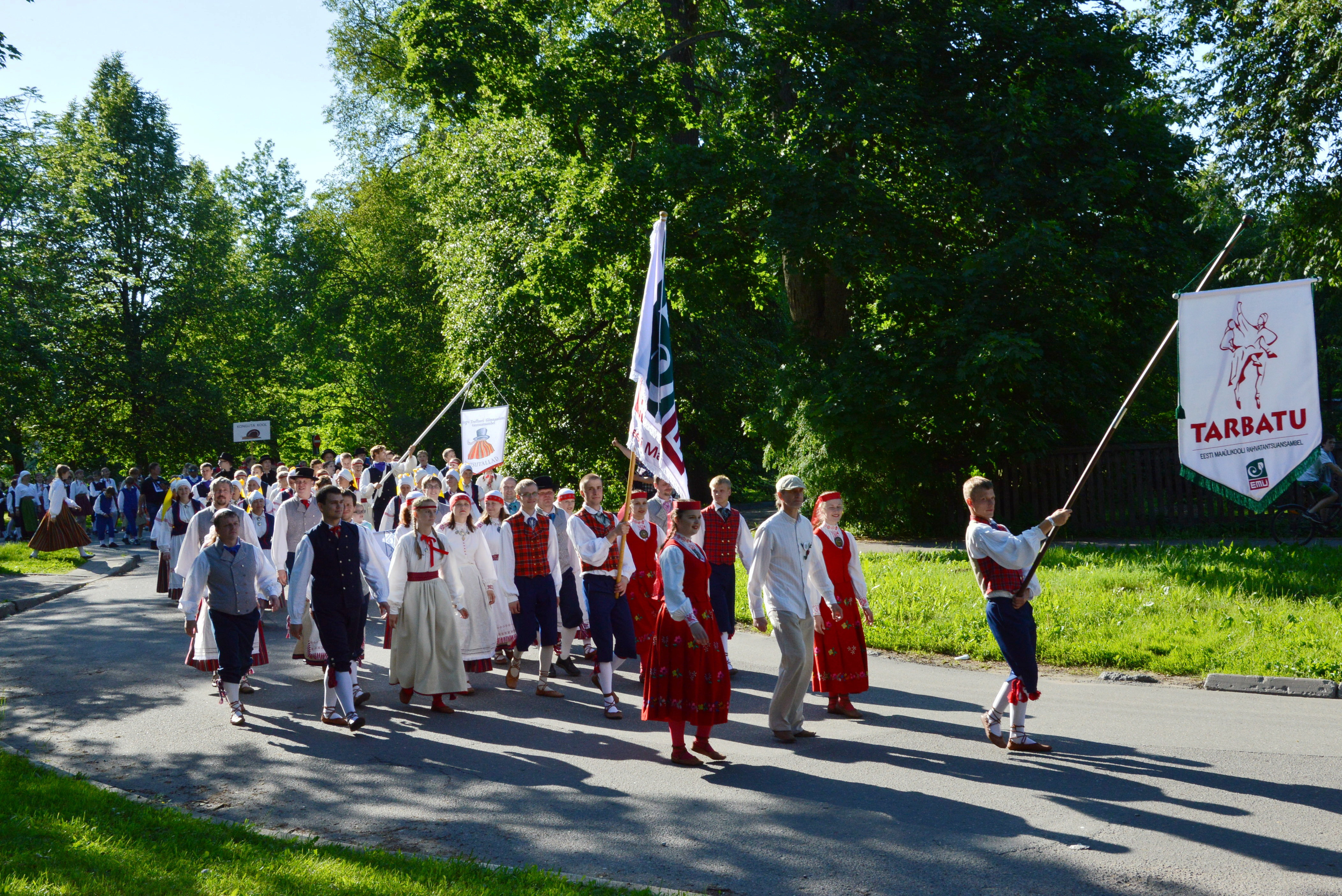
The university's folk dance ensemble Tarbatu

The Estonian Agricultural Academy was directly subordinate to the Soviet Union Ministry of Agriculture and prepared specialists in different fields of agriculture from agronomists and animal breeders to experts in the electrification of large farms. Work continued in this way until the end of the 1980s.

After the regaining of Estonian independence in 1991, the academy was renamed Estonian Agricultural University, and the institution restructured, also according to the radical changes in Estonian agriculture and forestry (such as the abolishment of kolkhozes and sovkhozes). New specialties like Environmental Protection, Landscape Architecture, Production and Marketing of Agricultural Products, Landscape Protection and Preservation, Applied Hydrobiology, Environmental Economics and Natural Resources Management were adopted.

Logo used between 2005 to 2025

Up to the end of 2004, the university had six faculties (Agronomy, Agricultural Engineering, Economics & Social Sciences, Forestry, Rural Engineering, and Veterinary Sciences) and eight institutes (Estonian Agribiocentre, Estonian Plant Biotechnology Research Institute EVIKA, Forest Research Institute, Institute of Animal Science, Institute of Environmental Protection, Institute of Experimental Biology, Institute of Zoology and Botany and Polli Institute of Horticulture).

However, the EAU was always in limbo, not least under the influence of Europeanization after Estonia joined the European Union in 2004. Thus, in the same year, the change to Estonian University of Life Sciences and refocusing was carried out, aimed at guaranteeing the institution's survival in the coming times.

=== Rectors ===
- Richard Antons (1951–1954)
- Minna Klement (1954–1969)
- Arnold Rüütel (1969–1977)
- Nikolai Koslov (1977–1988)
- Olev Saveli (1988–1993)
- Mait Klaassen (1993–1998)
- Henn Elmet (1998–2002)
- Alar Karis (2003–2007)
- Mait Klaassen (2008–2022)
- Ülle Jaakma (2023–)

Two of the rectors, Rüütel and Karis, have later served as President of Estonia.

== See also ==
- Maaülikool

== Notes ==
- History of Eesti Maaülikool
