= Vorbuse =

Village in Estonia

- Village
- Location in Estonia
- Coordinates: 58°25′34″N 26°39′00″E
- Country: Estonia
- County: Tartu County
- Municipality: Tartu urban municipality

Population (2011 Census)
  - Total: 258

Vorbuse is a village in Tartu urban municipality, Tartu County in southern Estonia. It is located northwest of the city of Tartu, about 6 kilometres (3.7 mi) from the city centre. Vorbuse is bordered by the Emajõgi River to the northeast and by the Tallinn–Tartu road (part of E263) to the south. The Tallinn–Tartu railway passes through the village and crosses the Emajõgi over the Jänese railway bridge. As of the 2011 census, the village's population was 258. Prior to the 2017 administrative reform of local governments, Vorbuse was located in Tähtvere Parish.

The wrestler August Pikker (1889–1976) was born in Vorbuse.

== Gallery ==
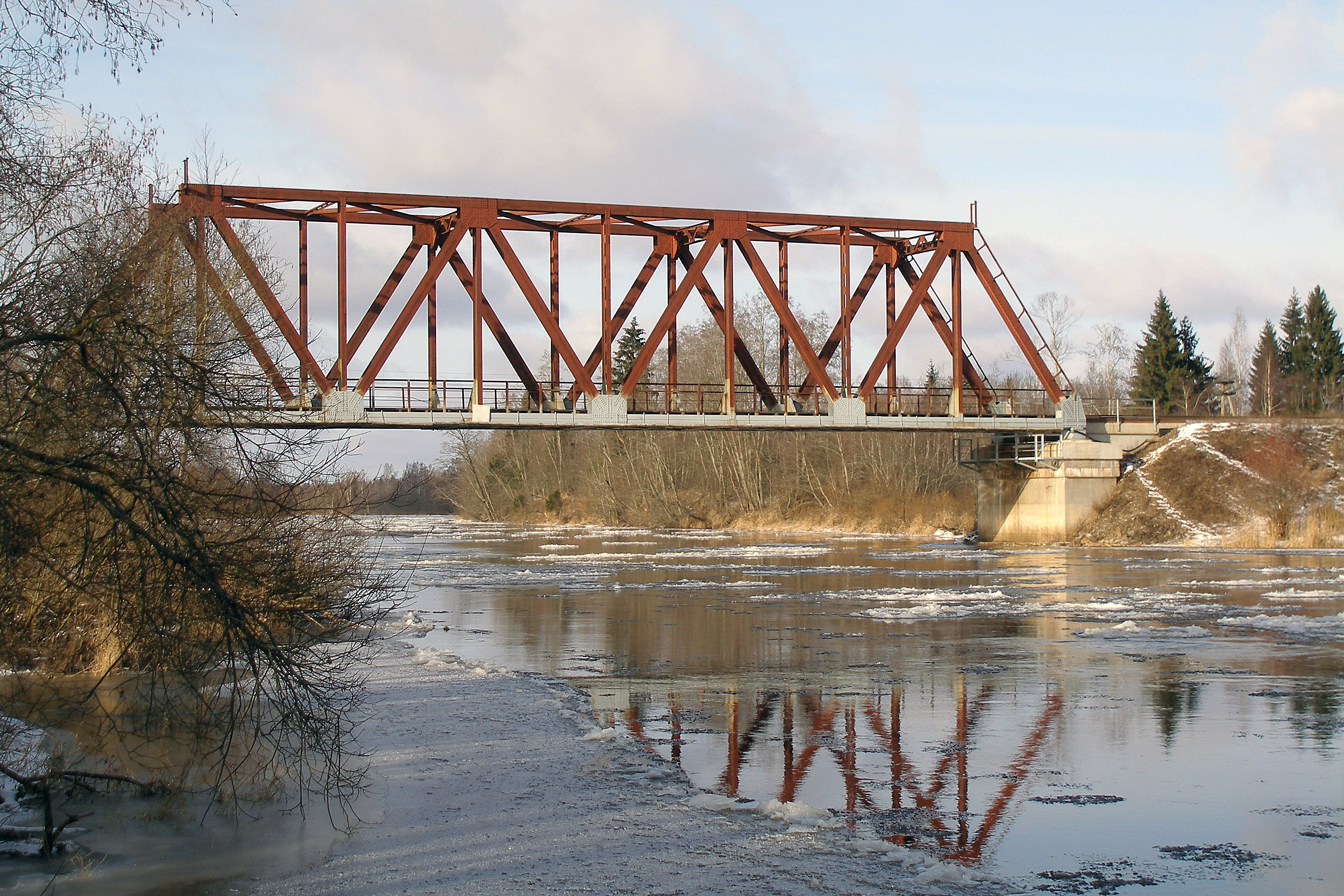
Jänese railway bridge over Emajõgi between Vorbuse and Maramaa

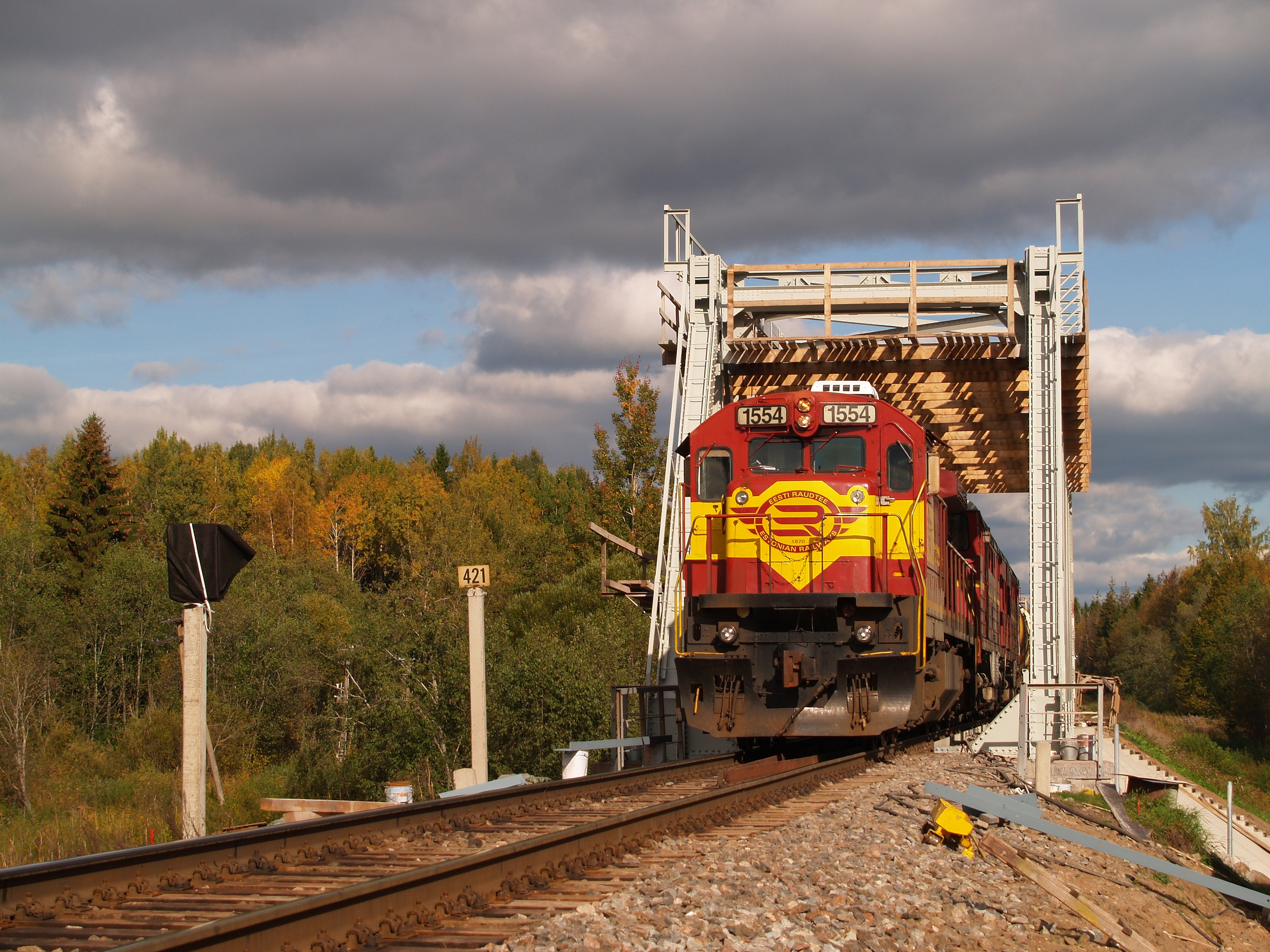

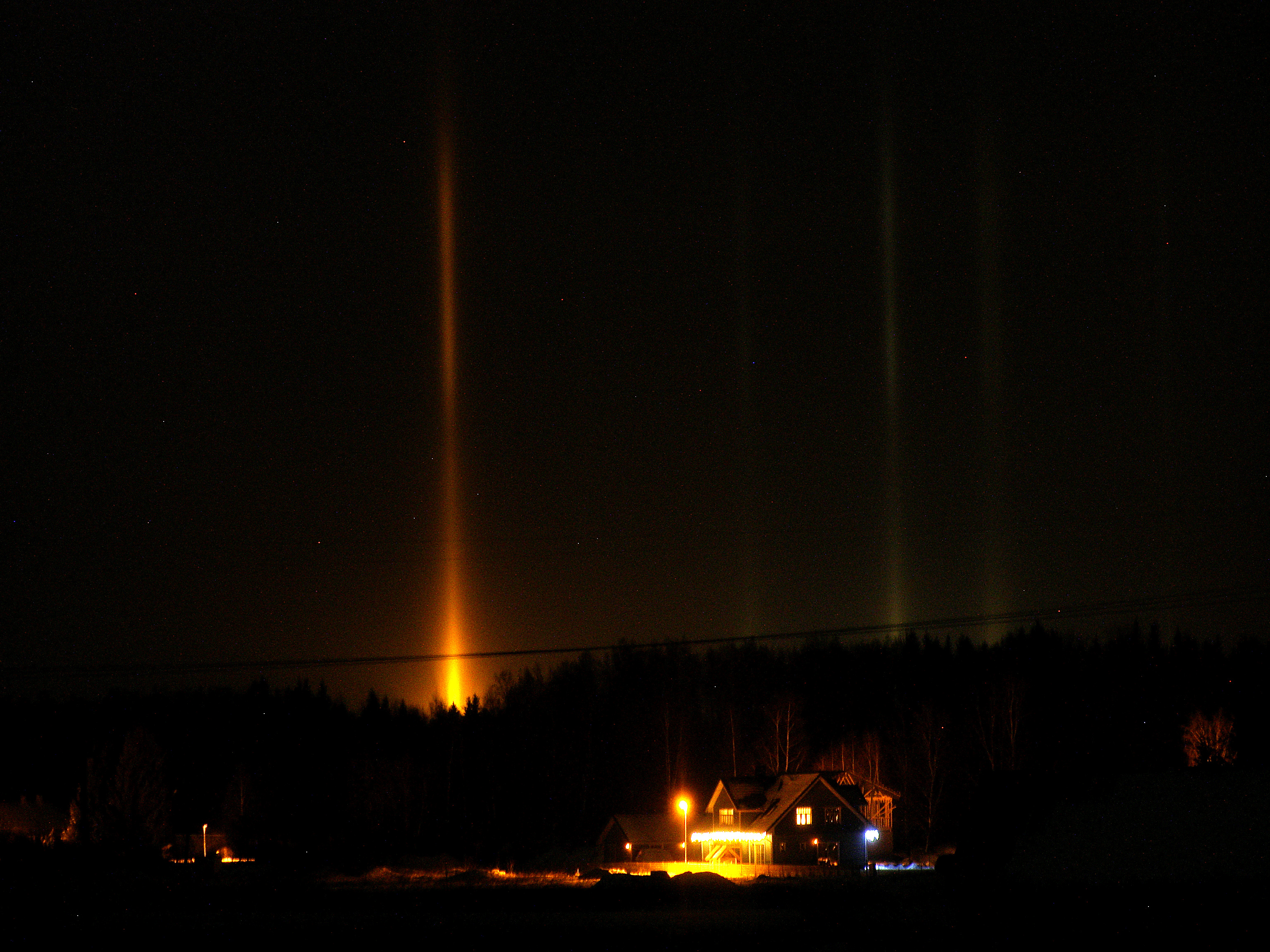
Light pillars in Vorbuse
