= Puru, Estonia =

Village in Estonia

Coordinates: 59°19′N 27°24′E

Puru
- Village
- Interactive map of Puru
- Country: Estonia
- County: Ida-Viru County
- Parish: Jõhvi Parish
- Time zone: UTC+2 (EET)
  - Summer (DST): UTC+3 (EEST)

Puru is a village in Jõhvi Parish, Ida-Viru County in northeastern Estonia.

Jõhvi Airfield (ICAO: EEJI) is located on the territories of Puru village.

Pedagogic scientist, school director and politician Peeter Põld (1878–1930) was born in Puru.
