= Ilmatsalu (village) =

Village in Estonia

- Village
- Location within Estonia
- Coordinates: 58.385277777778°N 26.538611111111°E
- Country: Estonia
- County: Tartu County
- Municipality: Tartu urban municipality
- Time zone: UTC+2 (EET)
  - Summer (DST): UTC+3 (EEST)

Ilmatsalu (German: Ilmazahl) is a village in Tartu urban municipality, Tartu County in Estonia. Prior to the 2017 administrative reform of local governments, it was located in Tähtvere Parish.
