= Maaülikool =

Estonian magazine

- Frequency: quarterly (since 2016), monthly (2012–2015), biweekly (until 2012)
- Publisher: Estonian University of Life Sciences
- Language: Estonian

Maaülikool is the quarterly magazine (formerly a newspaper) of the Estonian University of Life Sciences (Eesti Maaülikool).
