= Konstantin Treffner =

Estonian educator and politician

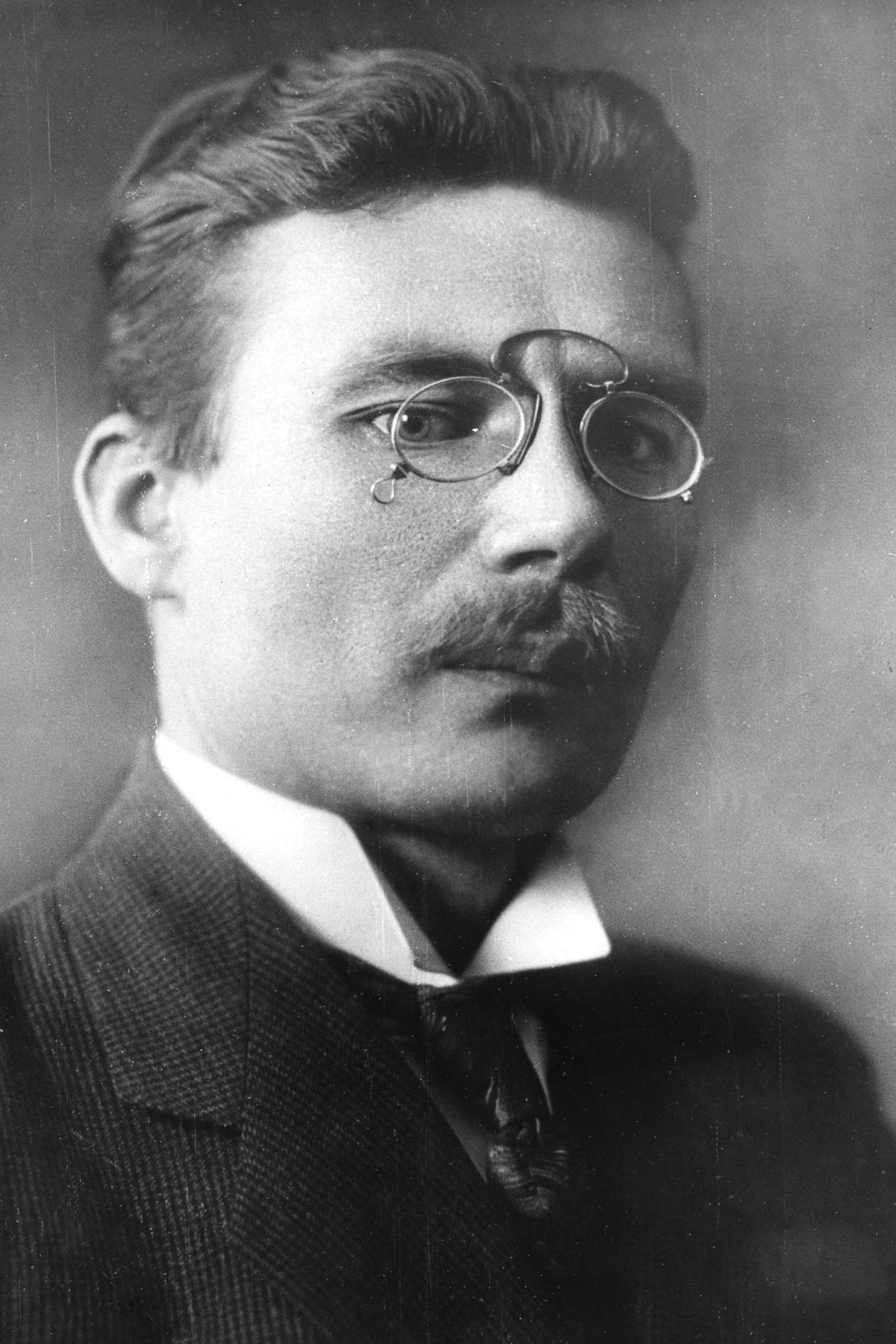
Konstantin Treffner

Konstantin Treffner (13 October 1885 – 9 December 1978 Tallinn) was an Estonian educator and politician.

1919-1920 he was Minister of Education.
