= Rahinge =

Village in Estonia

- village
- Location in Estonia
- Coordinates: 58°22′45″N 26°36′59″E
- Country: Estonia
- County: Tartu County
- Municipality: Tartu urban municipality
- First mentioned: 1582

Population (31.12.2010)
  - Total: 352
- Website: www.rahinik.ee

Rahinge is a village in Tartu urban municipality, Tartu County, Estonia. It is located about 6 km (4 mi) west of the city of Tartu. Rahinge has a population of 352 (as of 31 December 2010). Prior to the 2017 administrative reform of local governments, Rahinge was located in Tähtvere Parish.

Rahinge was first mentioned in 1582 and has borne the names of Rahinik, Rahhingo and Rahingu.

Poet Karl Eduard Sööt (1862–1950) spent his childhood in Rahinge.

== Gallery ==
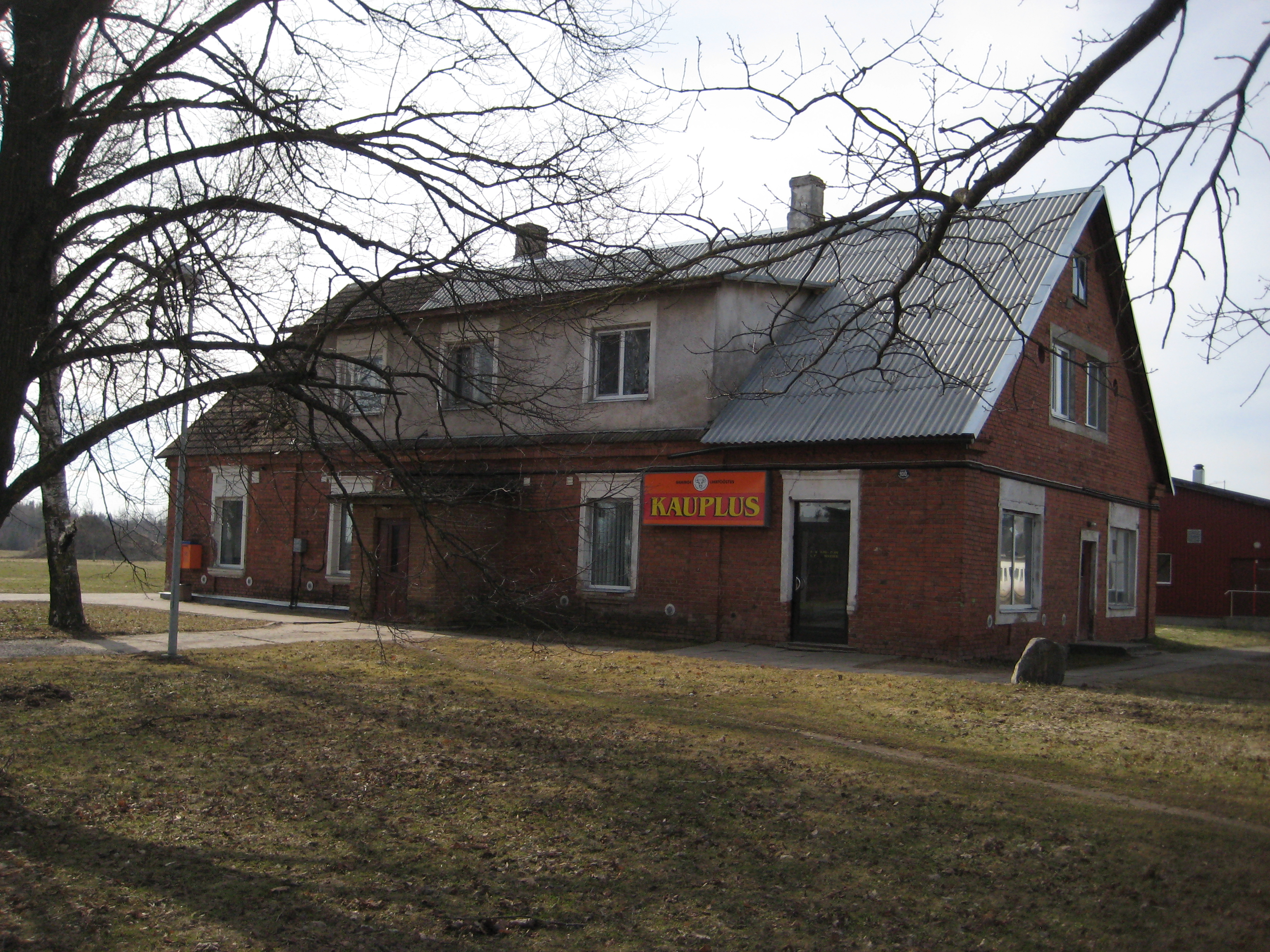
Local store in Rahinge.

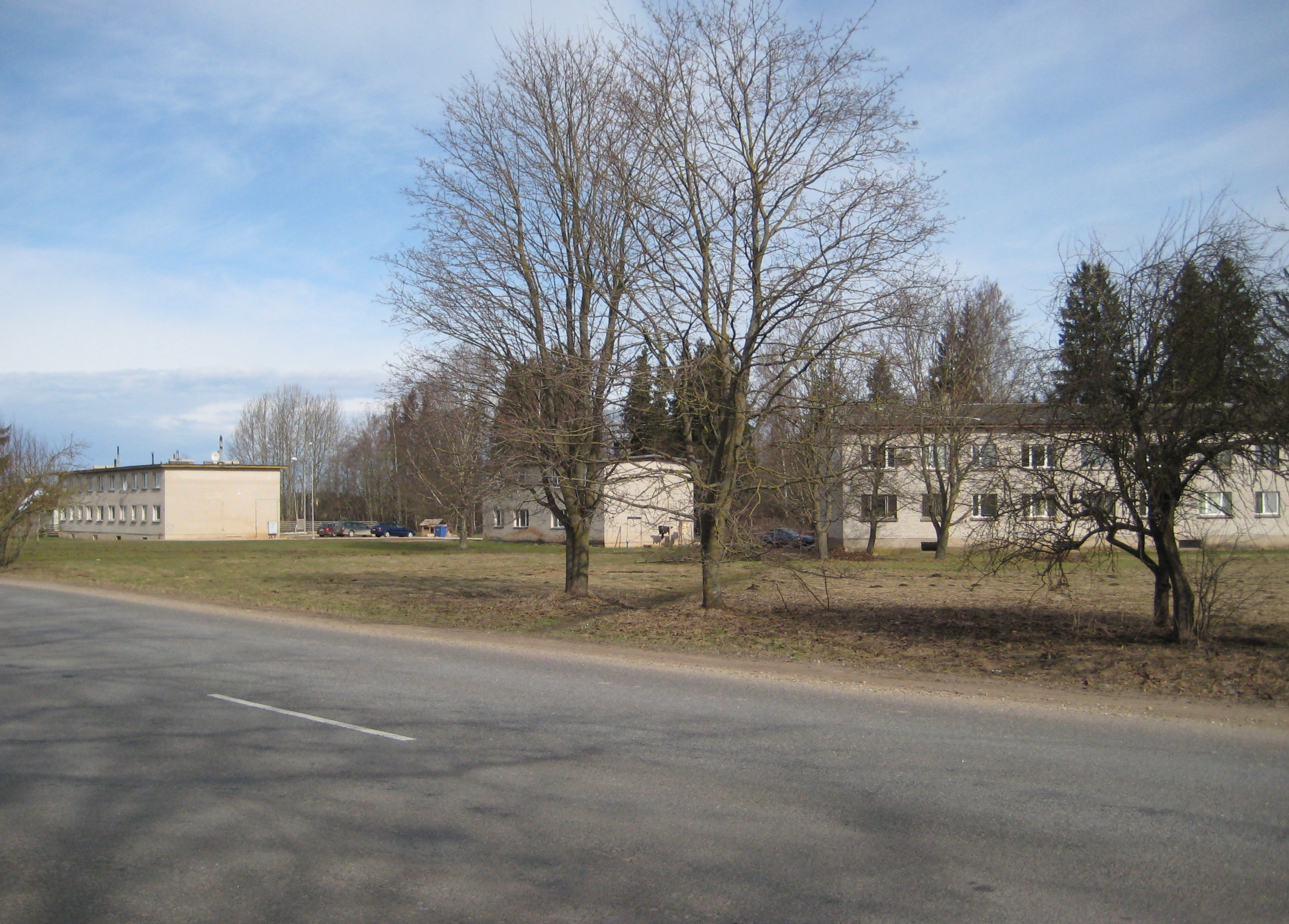
Apartment buildings

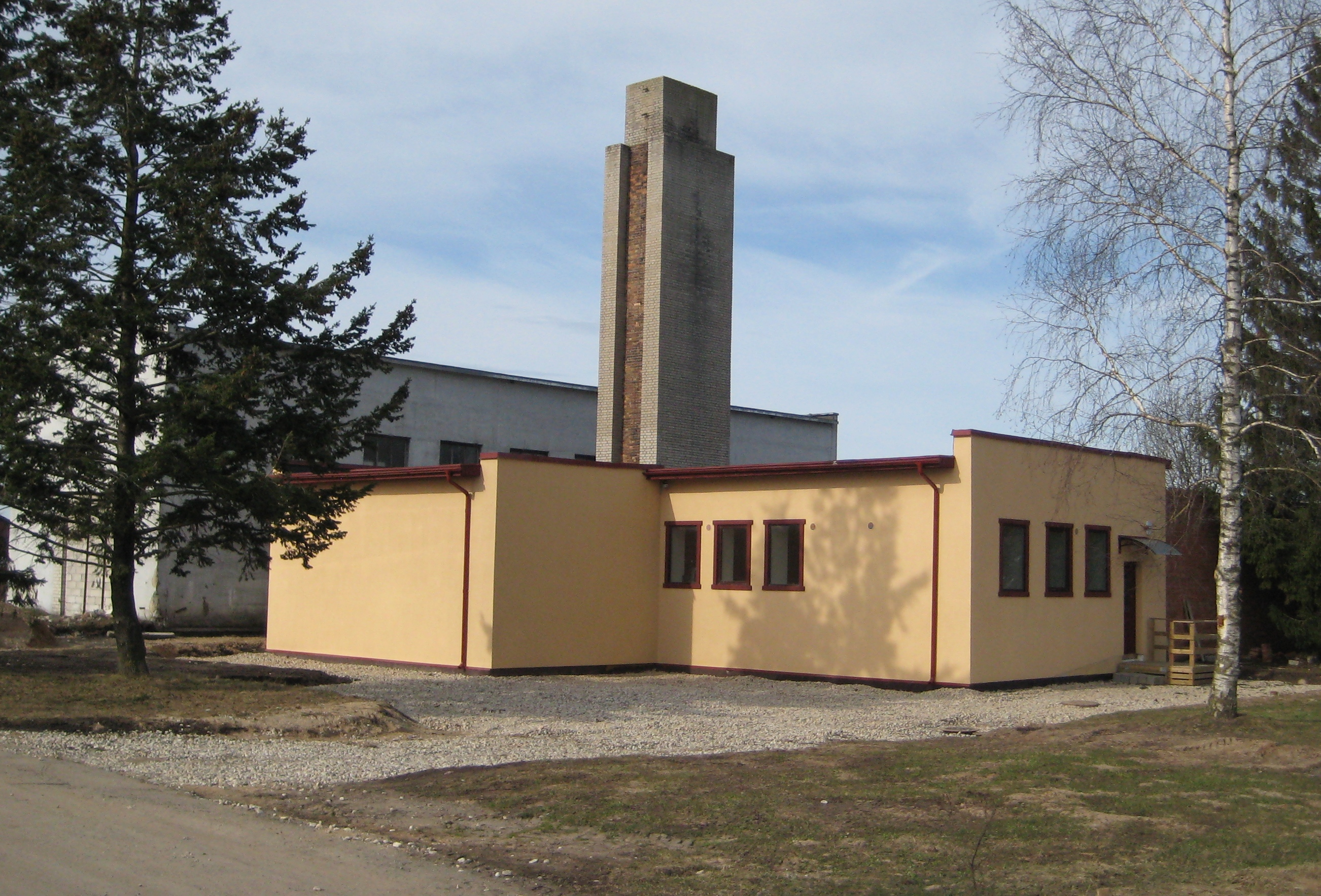
Rahinge cultural centre, former boilerhouse.

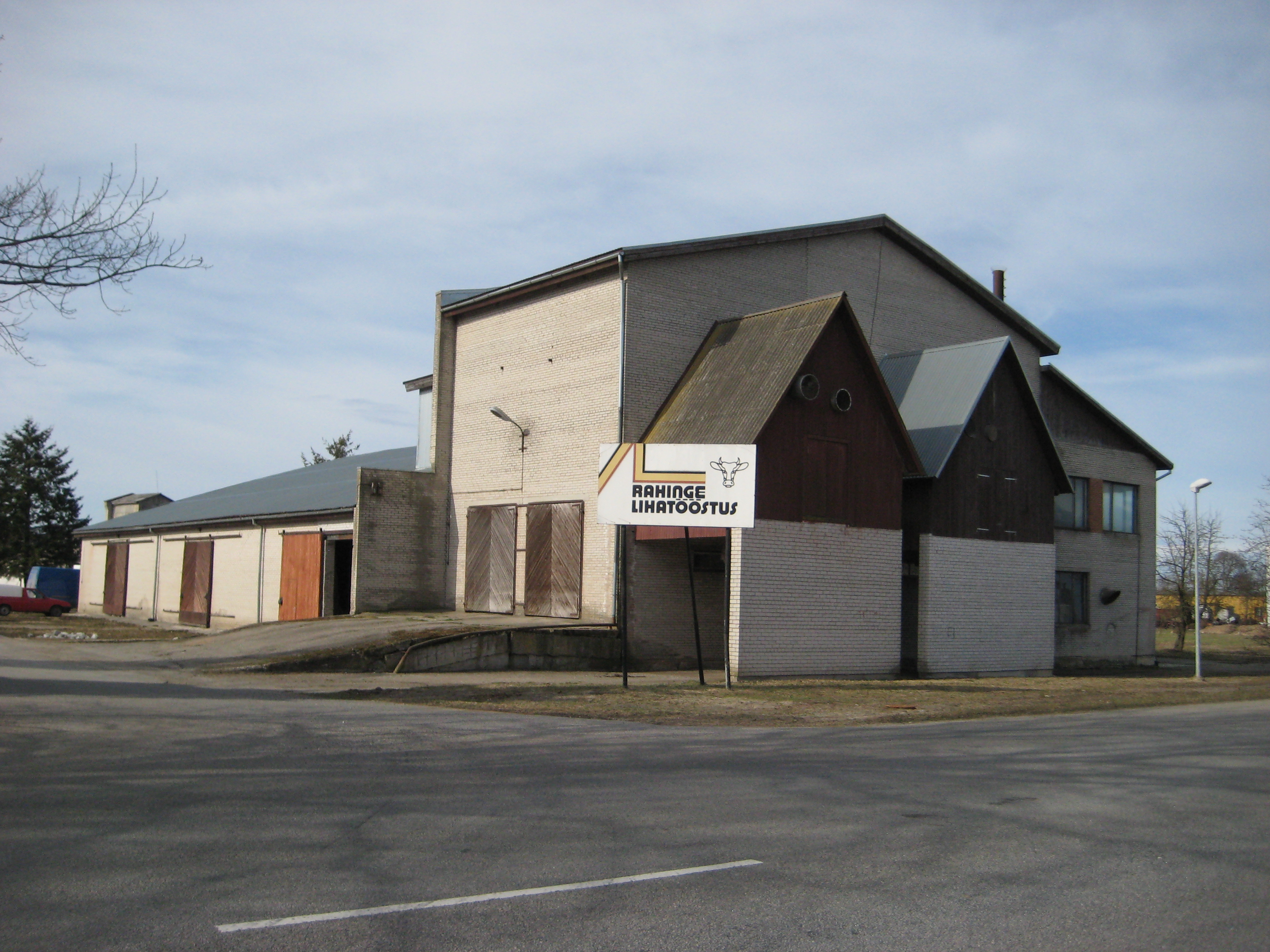
Rahinge meat processing plant
