= Friedrich Sauer =

Estonian politician (1881–1927)

Friedrich Sauer (also Priit Saue; 27 October 1881 – 27 October 1927 Tallinn) was an Estonian politician.

In 1920 he was Minister of Minister of Education.
