= Kardla =

Village in Estonia

Coordinates: 58°27′09″N 26°35′20″E

- Village
- Interactive map of Kardla
- Country: Estonia
- County: Tartu County
- Municipality: Tartu urban municipality
- Time zone: UTC+2 (EET)
  - Summer (DST): UTC+3 (EEST)

Kardla is a village in Tartu urban municipality, Tartu County, Estonia. Prior to the 2017 administrative reform of local governments, it was located in Tähtvere Parish.
