= Haage =

Village in Estonia

Coordinates: 58°22′N 26°38′E

- Village
- Interactive map of Haage
- Country: Estonia
- County: Tartu County
- Municipality: Tartu urban municipality
- Time zone: UTC+2 (EET)
  - Summer (DST): UTC+3 (EEST)

Haage is a village in Tartu urban municipality, Tartu County, Estonia. Prior to the 2017 administrative reform of local governments, it was located in Tähtvere Parish.
