= Rein Loik =

Estonian politician and mountain climber

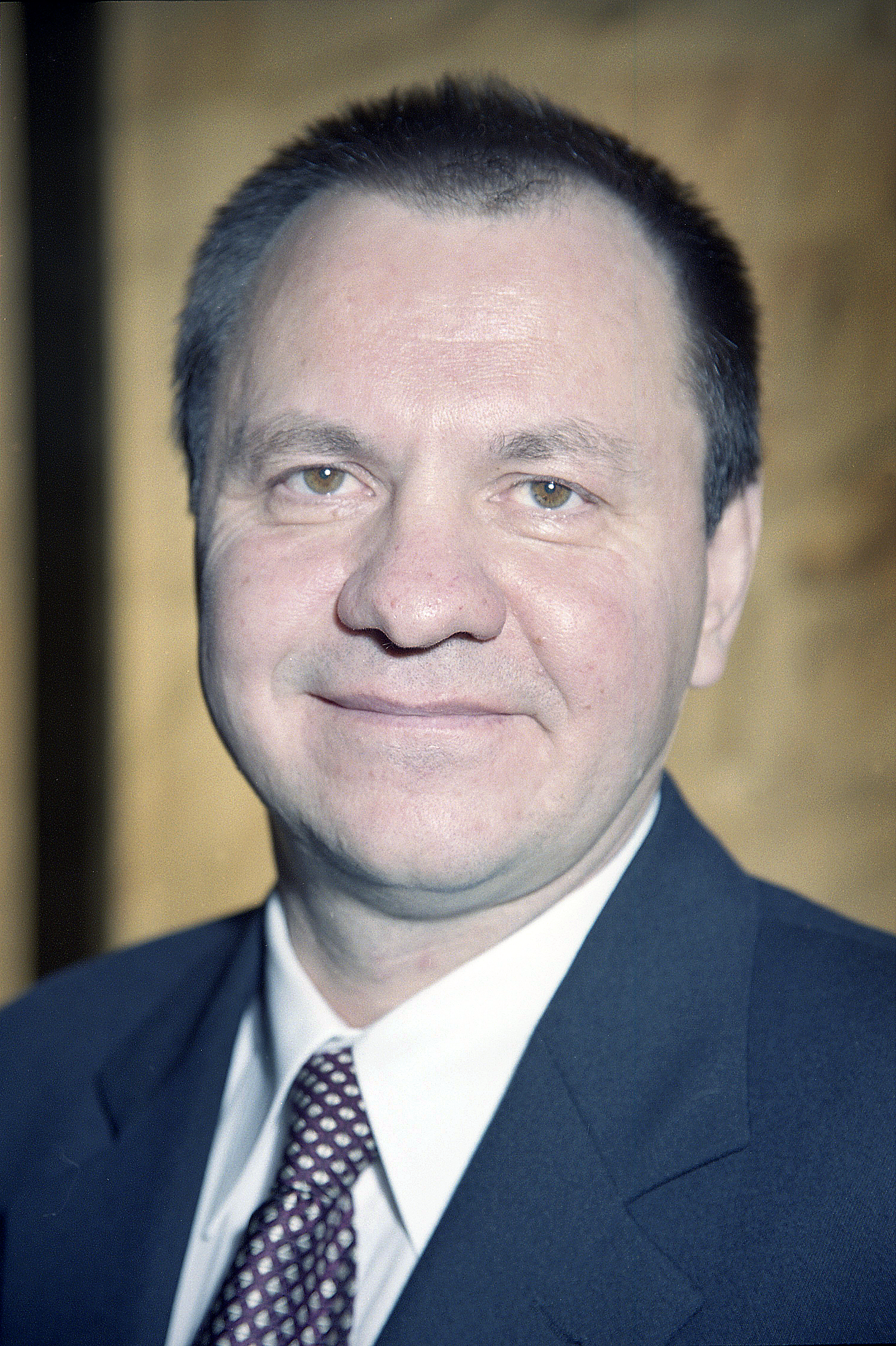
Rein Loik in 1999

Rein Loik (born 30 July 1950 in Kehra) is an Estonian politician, mountain climber and sports figure.

In 1973 he graduated from University of Tartu in economic cybernetics.

From 1975 to 2003 he was active in alpinism, and was also a member of Estonian team of alpinism.

From 1989 to 1992 and from 1996 to 1997 he was Estonian Minister of Education. On 17 January 2017, he was elected mayor of Viimsi. On 7 April 2020, Rõuge rural municipality council elected him as the deputy mayor.
