= Tartu Vocational Education Centre =

Vocational school in Tartu, Estonia

- Tartu Kutsehariduskeskus
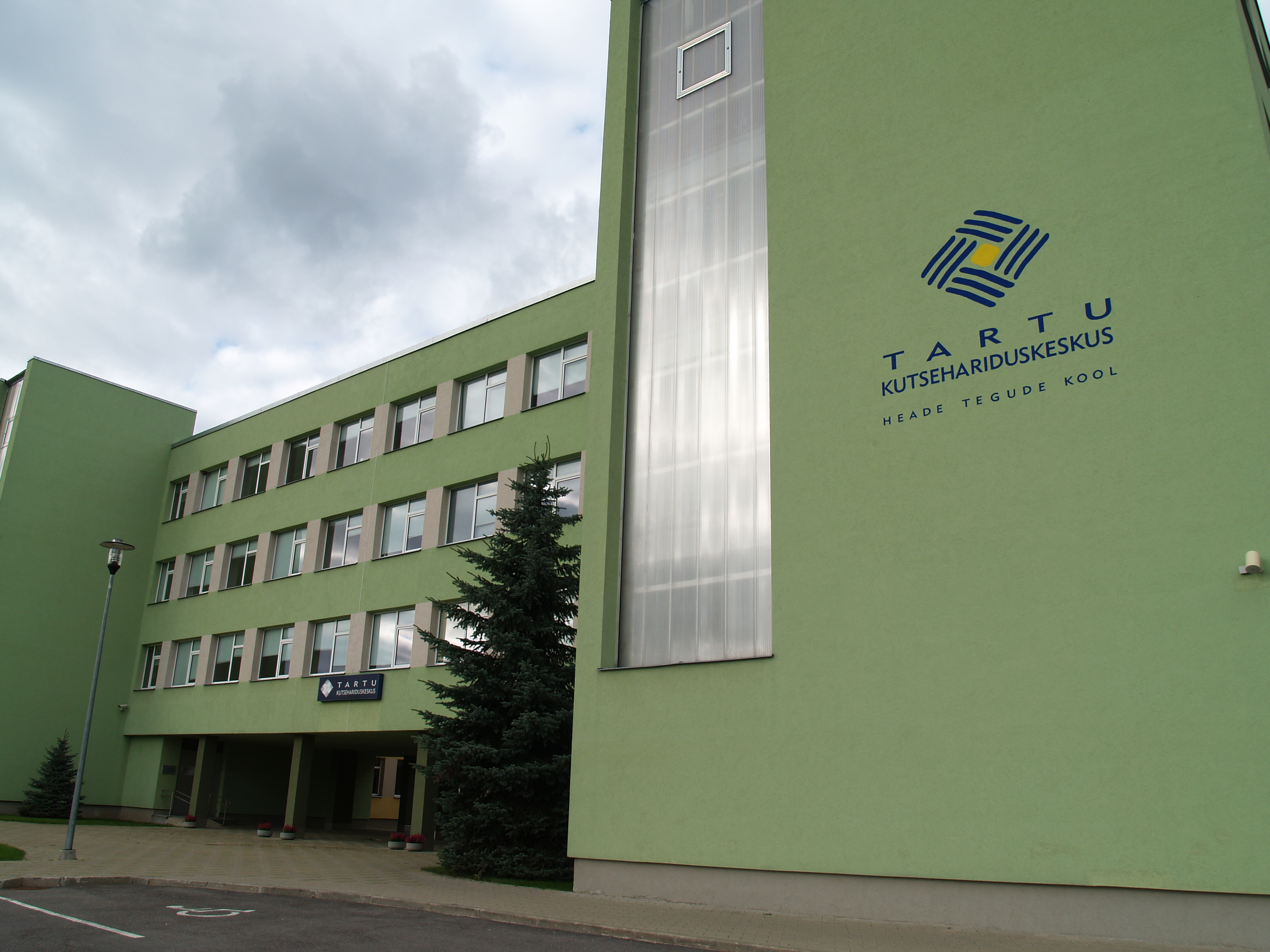
- Tartu Vocational Education Centre

Location
- Kopli 1 Tartu, Tartu County, 50115; Estonia
- Coordinates: 58°20′59″N 26°42′51″E

Information
- Religious affiliation: Secular
- Founded: 2002
- Status: Open
- Website: Official website

Tartu Vocational Education Centre (Estonian: Tartu Kutsehariduskeskus, abbreviation TKHK) is a vocational school in Tartu, Estonia. It is the biggest vocational school in Estonia.

As of 2021, over 2700 students are studying at degree study (Estonian: tasemeõpe) and over 3000 students at adults schooling (Estonian: täiskasvanute koolitus).

TKHK is founded in 2002 as a merger of four schools: Tartu Ehitus‐ ja Kergetööstuskool (established in 1944), Tartu Industrial School (Estonian: Tartu Tööstuskool) (established in 1922), Tartu Teeninduskool (established in 1984) and Tartu Õppekeskus (established in 1970).
