= Väino Kull =

Estonian politician (1943-2025)

Väino Kull (8 November 1943 – 13 August 2025) was an Estonian politician who served as Mayor of Tartu from 11 November 1993 to 31 October 1996.

== Life and career ==
Kull was born in Tartu on 8 November 1943. He graduated from Tallinn Polytechnic Institute in 1969 as a mechanical engineer.

Väino Kull was the Deputy Mayor of Tartu in the early 1990s, then for a short time he was the General Director of Tartu Autovedude. From 1993 to 1996 he was the Mayor of Tartu.

Väino Kull made a great contribution to the development of the legal basis and practical work organization of the city of Tartu with his work. Under his leadership, the first statute of the city of Tartu was drawn up, the preparation of the city's first general plan and several development documents began, land reform and the privatization of apartments and the privatization of trade, catering and service enterprises were carried out. During this period, a new singing stage was also completed, the open market and the Kroonuaia bridge were built. After becoming mayor, Väino Kull was a member of three councils, fulfilling the duties of the council chairman, deputy chairman and member of several committees.

He has also been the chairman of the Estonian Reform Party faction in the city council and has been a member of the councils of city enterprises (including the Aura Center). In the second half of the 1990s, he led the electoral alliance "Tartu 2000", and was also a member of the board of the Estonian Coalition Party.

Kull died in Tartu on 12 August 2025, at the age of 81.

== Recognition ==
- 2006 Order of the White Star, 4th class
- 2017 Honorary citizen of the city of Tartu and The Tartu Star
