= Toivo Maimets =

Estonian biologist

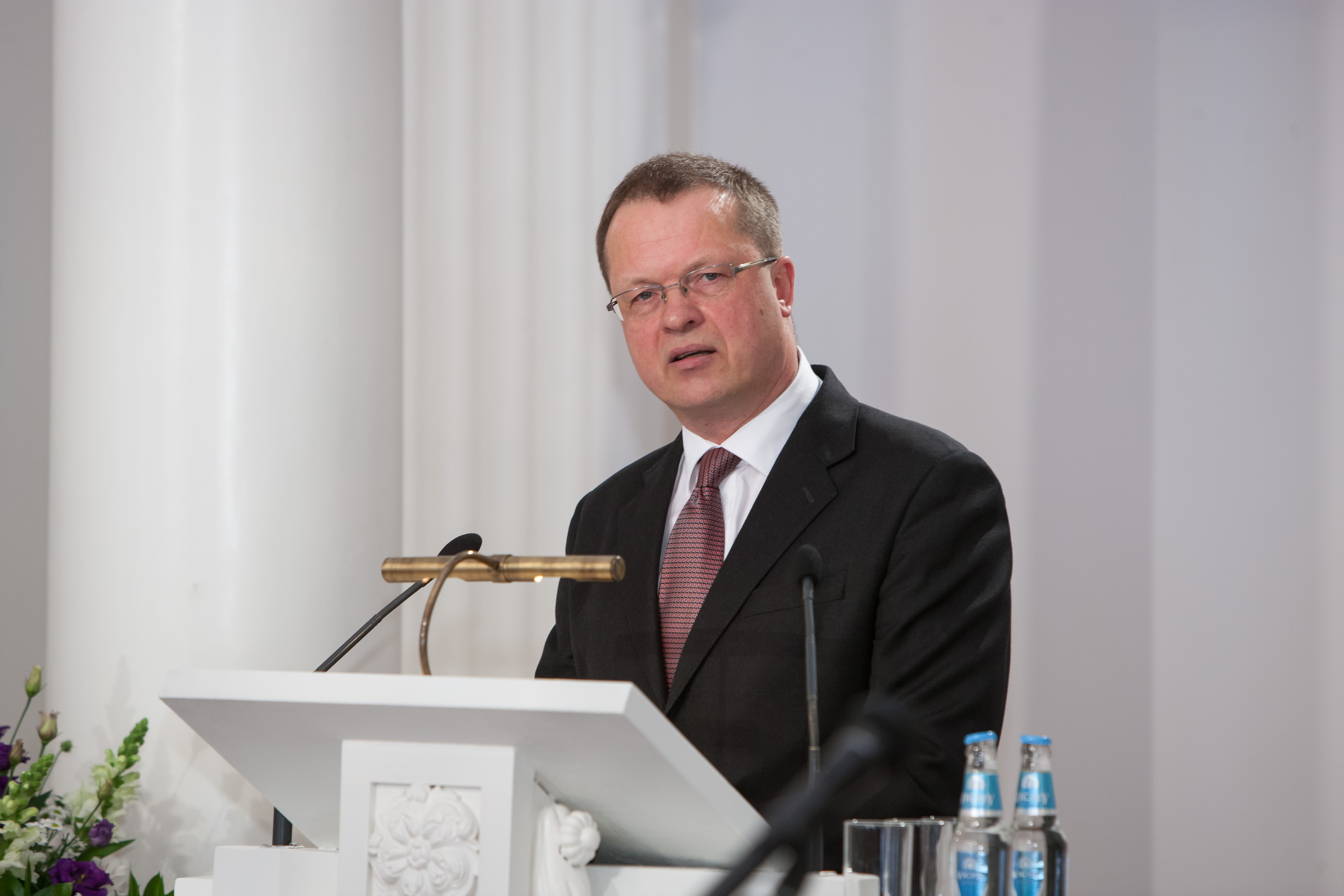
Toivo Maimets

Toivo Maimets (born 29 December 1957 in Tartu) is an Estonian biologist and cell biology professor at the University of Tartu. From 2003 to 2005 he was the Minister of Education of Estonia, representing the Res Publica Party.

== Education ==
Maimets studied at the Miina Härma Gymnasium and the Tartu Tamme Gymnasium. He graduated in 1975. After graduating from high school he went to study biology at the University of Tartu, graduating in 1980. In 1984 he received a Candidate of Sciences degree at Moscow State University in molecular biology.

== Honors ==
- 2000 Eesti Kaitseliidu teenetemedal
- 2001 Order of the White Star, 4th class
- 2005 Order of the Lithuanian Grand Duke Gediminas, 2nd class (Lithuania)
- 2007 Medal of Tartu University (Estonian: Tartu Ülikooli medal)
- 2016 Teadusajakirjanduse sõbra auhind

== Personal life ==
Maimets is married and has three children (Andri Maimets, Kaire Maimets, and Marti Maimets). His brother, Matti Maimets, is the head of the Infection Department at the Tartu University Clinic. His father, Olev Maimets was a professor of anatomy at the University of Tartu.
