= Ülle Jaakma =

Estonian agronomist

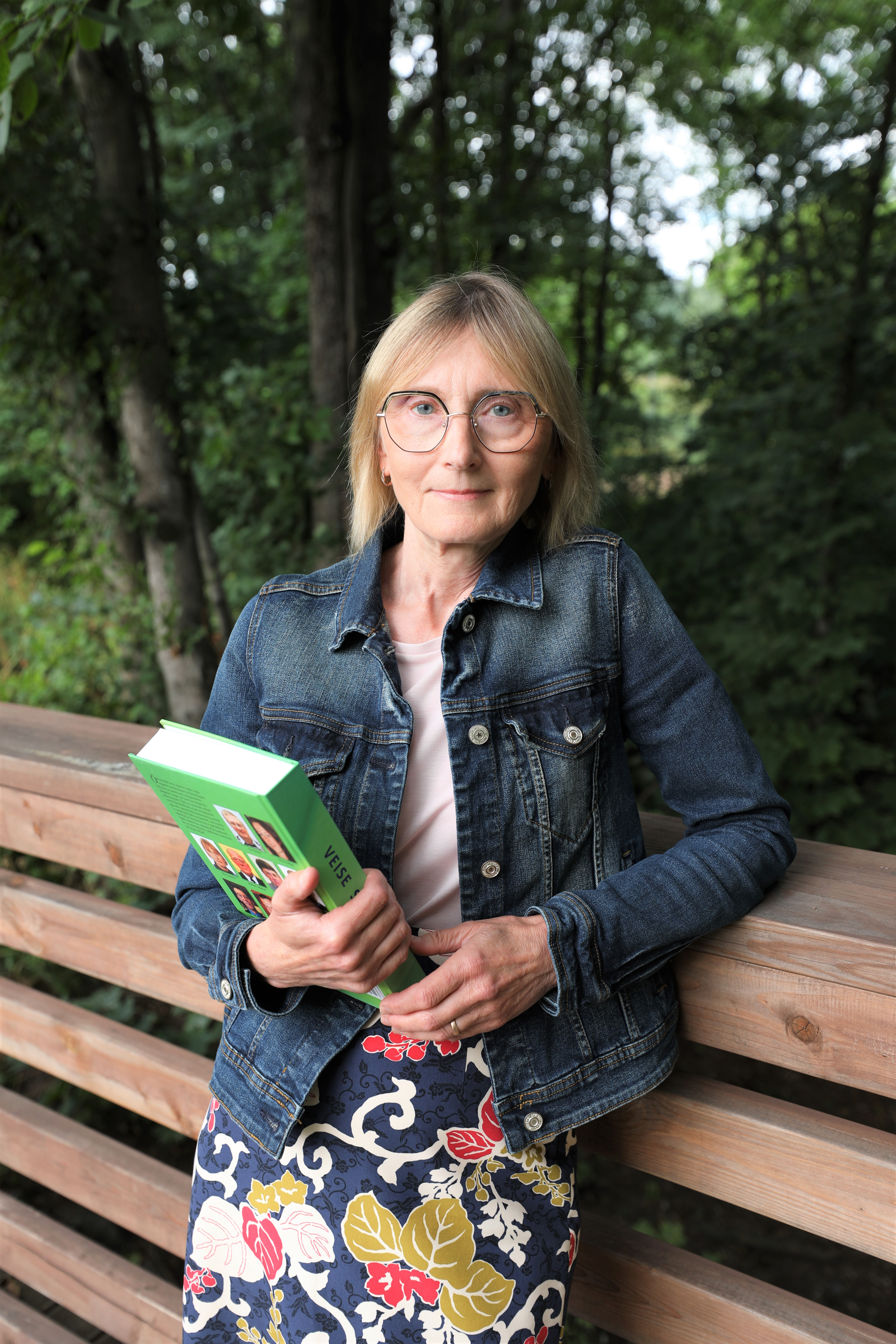
Ülle Jaakma in 2022

Ülle Jaakma (née Ülle Lahke; born 1 October 1957) is an Estonian agronomist. Since on 1 January 2023, she is the rector of Estonian University of Life Sciences.

Jaakma was born on the island of Muhu. She graduated from secondary school in Orissaare in 1975 and Tartu State University in 1980 as a biologist. Her narrower specialty is veterinary medicine.

Since 1995, she has been working at Estonian University of Life Sciences. Since 2005, she is professor at the university's Institute of Veterinary Medicine and Animal Sciences. Since 2013, she has been scientific prorector (Estonian: teadusprorektor) at the university.

In 2015, she was awarded with Order of the White Star, IV class.
