= Tüki =

Village in Estonia

- Village
- Location within Estonia
- Coordinates: 58.388888888889°N 26.581944444444°E
- Country: Estonia
- County: Tartu County
- Municipality: Tartu urban municipality
- Time zone: UTC+2 (EET)
  - Summer (DST): UTC+3 (EEST)

Tüki is a village in Tartu urban municipality, Tartu County in Estonia. Prior to the 2017 administrative reform of local governments, it was located in Tähtvere Parish.
