= Ilmatsalu =

Borough in Estonia

- Location within Estonia
- Coordinates: 58°23′11″N 26°32′48″E
- Country: Estonia
- County: Tartu County
- Municipality: Tartu urban municipality

Population (2011 Census)
  - Total: 392
- Time zone: UTC+2 (EET)

Ilmatsalu (German: Ilmazahl) is a small borough (alevik) in the Tartu urban municipality, Tartu County, Estonia. As of the 2011 census, the settlement's population was 392.
