= Jaan Kriisa =

Estonian politician (1882–1942)

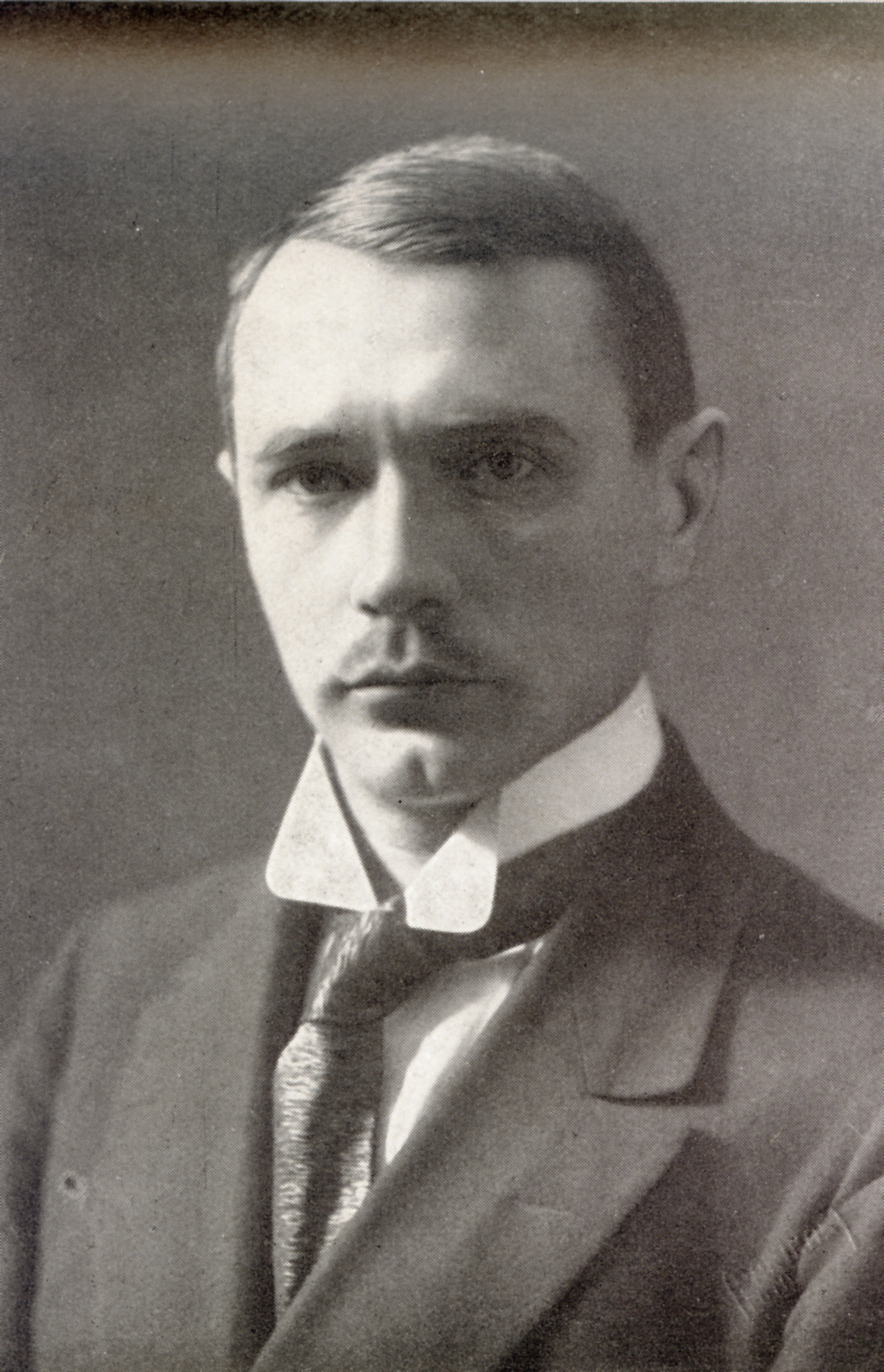
Jaan Kriisa

Jaan Kriisa (31 December 1882 Ulila Parish, Tartu County – 8 August 1942 Sosva, Sverdlovsk Oblast, Russia) was an Estonian lawyer and politician. He was a member of I Riigikogu.

Kriisa was the Mayor of Tartu from 1917 until 1918 and again in 1919. From 1919 until 1920, he was Minister of Nutrition. Kriisa was arrested by the NKVD on 14 June 1941 and died in a prison camp.
