= Tartu (urban municipality) =

Municipality of Estonia

Tartu Estonian: Tartu linn
- Municipality of Estonia
- Flag Coat of arms

- Location of Tartu in Estonia
- Country: Estonia
- County: Tartu County
- Administrative centre: Tartu

Government
  - Mayor: Urmas Klaas (Reform Party)

Area
  - Total: 154 km^{2} (59 sq mi)

Population (1.01.2021)
  - Total: 95,430
  - Density: 620/km^{2} (1,600/sq mi)
- ISO 3166 code: EE-793
- Website: Official website

Tartu (Estonian: Tartu linn) is an urban municipality of Estonia, in Tartu County. It consists of the city of Tartu, as well as the former Tähtvere Parish bordering the city in the north-west. Prior to the 2017 administrative reform, Tartu held negotiations with all neighbouring parishes, with Tähtvere Parish eventually being the only one to agree to the merge. The municipality is thus separate from the neighbouring Tartu Parish.

== Settlements ==
City

Tartu

Boroughs

Ilmatsalu and Märja

Villages

Haage, Ilmatsalu, Kandiküla, Kardla, Pihva, Rahinge, Rõhu, Tähtvere, Tüki, and Vorbuse.

== Government ==
There are 49 members on the city council, elected by residents every four years using a proportional system of representation.

The executive branch of the city government consists of a mayor and five deputy mayors. The current mayor is Urmas Klaas. Andrus Ansip, Prime Minister of Estonia from 2005 to 2014, was mayor of Tartu from 1998 to 2004. The position was later served by other politicians who eventually became ministers of government, Laine Jänes and Urmas Kruuse. All of them are members of the Estonian Reform Party, which has dominated in Tartu since 1998.

== International relations ==
=== Twin towns – Sister cities ===
Tartu is twinned with:

Bærum, Norway; Deventer, Netherlands; Ferrara, Italy; Frederiksberg, Denmark; (Armenian Soviet Socialist Republic) (now) Gyumri, Armenia (signed in Soviet times); Hafnarfjörður, Iceland	Hämeenlinna, Finland; Kaunas, Lithuania; Lüneburg, Germany; Pskov, Russia; Riga, Latvia; Salisbury, United States	Tampere, Finland; Turku, Finland; Uppsala, Sweden; Veszprém, Hungary; Zutphen, Netherlands

== Demographics ==
Tartu city population pyramid in 2022

Religion in Tartu City (2021)
1. Unaffiliated (77.1%)
2. Lutheran (10.2%)
3. Orthodox & Old Believers (8.40%)
4. Others Christians (2.10%)
5. Others Religions or Unknown (2.00%)
6. 0.00%
