= List of Estonian scientists =

This is a list of Estonian scientists.

== Astronomers and space scientists ==
- Jaan Einasto (born 1929), astrophysicist
- Ernst Öpik (1893–1985), astronomer and astrophysicist
- Alar Toomre (born 1937), astronomer

== Biologists, botanists and ecologists ==
- Jaan Eilart (1933–2006), phytogeographer, landscape ecologist, cultural historian and conservationist
- Toomas Frey (1937–2020), ecologist, geobotanist and forest scientist
- Fred Jüssi (1935–2024), biologist
- Toomas Kukk (born 1971), botanist
- Ülle Kukk (born 1937), botanist and conservationist
- Kalevi Kull (born 1952), biologist and semiotician
- Olevi Kull (1955–2007), ecologist
- Tiiu Kull (born 1958), botanist
- Eerik Kumari (1912–1984), biologist
- Liivia Laasimer (1918–1988), botanist
- Teodor Lippmaa (1892–1943), botanist
- Aime Mäemets (1930–1996), botanist and hydrobiologist
- Ann Marvet (born 1939), botanist
- Viktor Masing (1925–2001), botanist and ecologist
- Ingmar Ott (born 1955), botanist
- Erast Parmasto (1928–2012), mycologist, bioscientist and botanist
- Kaljo Pork (1930–1981), botanist
- Jaan Port (1891–1950), botanist
- Riinu Rannap (born 1966), zoologist
- Haide-Ene Rebassoo (1935–2018), botanist
- Bernhard Saarsoo (1899–1964), botanist
- Andres Salumets (born 1971), biologist, biochemist and educator
- Urmas Tartes (born 1963), biologist
- Hans Trass (1928–2017), ecologist and botanist
- Aleksei Turovski (born 1946), zoologist and ethologist
- Albert Üksip (1886–1966), botanist and actor
- August Vaga (1893–1960), botanist
- Gustav Vilbaste (1885–1967), botanist
- Olev Vinn (born 1971), paleobiologist and paleontologist
- Martin Zobel (born 1957), ecologist

== Chemists and material scientists ==
- Paul Kogerman (1891–1951), chemist
- Jüri Kukk (1940–1981), chemist
- Miia Rannikmäe (born 1951), chemist
- Hillar Rootare (1928–2008), chemist
- Ivar Karl Ugi (1930–2005), chemist
- Lauri Vaska (1925–2015), chemist

== Economists ==
- Ardo Hansson (born 1958), economist
- Ragnar Nurkse (1907–1959), economist
- Raul Renter (1920–1992), economist

== Geneticists ==
- Toomas Kivisild (born 1969), geneticist
- Andres Metspalu (born 1951), geneticist
- Lili Milani (born 1981), geneticist
- Riin Tamm (born 1981), geneticist

== Historians and art historians ==
- Vello Helk (1923–2014), historian
- Magnus Ilmjärv (born 1961), historian
- Richard Indreko (1900–1961), historian and archaeologist
- Andres Kasekamp (born 1961), historian
- Mart Laar (born 1960), historian
- Villem Raam (1910–1996), art historian, art critic and conservator-restorer

== Linguists and ethnographers ==
- Johannes Aavik (1880–1973), philologist
- Paul Ariste (1905–1990), linguist
- Oskar Kallas (1868–1946), linguist, folklorist and diplomat
- Elmar Muuk (1901–1941), linguist
- Jaan Puhvel (born 1932), linguist
- Paul Saagpakk (1910–1996), linguist
- Evar Saar (born 1969), linguist, toponymist and journalist

== Mathematicians and computer scientists ==
- Victor Aladjev (1942–2025), mathematician and cybernetician
- Gunnar Kangro (1913–1975), mathematician
- Edgar Krahn (1894–1961), mathematician
- Leiki Loone (born 1944), mathematician
- Andres Luure (born 1959), philosopher and mathematician
- Jaan Sarv (1877–1954), mathematician
- Alar Toomre (born 1937), astronomer and mathematician

== Psychologists ==
- Jüri Allik (born 1949), psychologist
- Mart Murdvee (1951–2022), psychologist and scholar
- Konstantin Ramul (1879–1975), psychologist
- Mare Teichmann (born 1954), psychologist
- Endel Tulving (1927–2023), psychologist and cognitive neuroscientist

== Physicists ==
- Jaak Aaviksoo (born 1954), physicist and politician
- Endel Aruja (1911–2008), physicist
- Vladimir Hütt (1936–1997), physicist
- Harald Keres (1912–2010), physicist
- Madis Kõiv (1929–2014), physicist, writer and philosopher
- Gustav Naan (1919–1994), physicist and philosopher
- Karl Rebane (1926–2007), physicist
- Ljubov Rebane (1929–1991), physicist
- Kaido Reivelt (born 1970), physicist

== Other scientists ==
- Endel Laas (1915–2009), forest scientist
- Endel Lippmaa (1930–2015), academian, politician, founder and chairman of the Science Council of the National Institute of Chemical Physics and Biophysics, chairman and professor of chemical physics, physical chemistry, physics, and mathematics
- Karl Leichter (1902–1987), musicologist

== See also ==
- List of Estonian people
- Lists of scientists
