= Eerik Kumari Award =

Estonian environmental award

- Native name: Eerik Kumari looduskaitsepreemia
- Description: Awarded for excellence in bioscience and nature conservation in Estonia
- Country: Estonia
- Presented by: Ministry of the Environment (Estonia)
- Reward: €5,000 (formerly 30,000 kroons)

Eerik Kumari Award (Estonian: Eerik Kumari looduskaitsepreemia) is an award given since 1989 to those who have excelled in bioscience in Estonia. It is named after Eerik Kumari (1912–1984), who was chairman of the National Conservation Committee of the Estonian Academy of Sciences from 1955 to 1984.

The Eerik Kumari award is currently valued at 5,000 euros, but 30,000 kroons in the past.

== Recipients ==
- 1989: Fred Jüssi
- 1990: Aare Mäemets
- 1991: Rein Maran
- 1992: Viktor Masing
- 1993: Mari Reitalu
- 1994: Madis Aruja
- 1995: Ilse Rootsmäe, Lemming Rootsmäe
- 1996: Arvi Järvekülg, Linda Metsaorg
- 1997: Hella Kink, Juhan Lepasaar
- 1998: Vaike Hang, Anto Raukas
- 1999: Vilju Lilleleht
- 2000: Veljo Ranniku
- 2001: Ann Marvet
- 2002: Edgar Valter
- 2003: Jaan Eilart
- 2004: Tiit Leito
- 2005: Enn-Aavo Pirrus
- 2006: Tiit Randla
- 2007: Loit Reintam
- 2008: Erast Parmasto
- 2009: Hans Trass, Tiit Petersoo
- 2010: Rein Einasto
- 2011: Jaan Riis
- 2012: Taivo Kastepõld
- 2013: Gennadi Skromnov
- 2014: Aivar Leito
- 2015: Tiit Sillaots
- 2016: Mati Kaal
- 2017: Agu Leivits
- 2018: Eerik Leibak
- 2019: Marju Kõivupuu
- 2020: Tiit Maran
- 2021: Kalev Sepp
- 2022: Hendrik Relve
- 2023: Urmas Tartes
- 2024: Kaja Lotman, Aleksei Lotman
- 2025: Kalevi Kull

== See also ==
- List of environmental awards
- List of biology awards
- List of prizes named after people
