= Estonian Nature Fund =

Organization based in Estonia

Logo of organization

Estonian Fund for Nature (Eestimaa Looduse Fond) or ELF is an Estonian environmental non-profit organisation.

== Mission ==
Mission of ELF is to preserve the rich natural diversity in Estonia and the world through active cooperation with individuals, business enterprises, organizations and state institutions through the following activities:

- protection of endangered species and their habitats;
- preservation of characteristic Estonian landscapes and habitats;
- promotion of sustainable use of natural resources;
- raising public awareness about environmental issues;
- finding solutions to preserve clean environment for future generations

== Founding ==
ELF was established in 1991 by biologists and conservationists and in close co-operation with World Wide Fund for Nature. WWF has remained ELF's main international co-operation partner. ELF is a member of IUCN.

== Board and Executives ==
Board members:

- Rainer Nõlvak - Chairman of the Board
- Rein Einasto
- Üllas Ehrlich
- Andres Tarand
- Katarina Veem
- Lembit Maamets
- Riinu Rannap
- Henri Laupmaa
- Ahti Heinla
- Anneli Palo
- Pille Tomson
- Riinu Rannap

The board is directing the activity of ELF convenes four times in a year and one third of its members will be re-elected in every two years (even years). The task of the Board is to give guidelines to the Executive Committee, workers and volunteers in planning the activities (approving annually the action plan and budget) and to counsel workers of the Fund in treating various issues. Members of the Board work on the voluntary basis.

Members of Executive Board in 2018:

Tarmo Tüür, Siim Kuresoo, Kadri Kalmus, Silvia Lotman and Kärt Vaarmari

== Achievements ==
After the restoration of independence of Estonia in 1991 a political decision was taken to restitute properties including land to the former owners or their descendants. Since it is much easier to form new protected areas when the land is owned by the state, ELF took quick action to safeguard the future of valuable areas by proposing the establishment of new big protected areas and natural parks. This led to the formation of Soomaa and Karula national parks and Alam-Pedja Nature Reserve. The area of these taken together is about 740 sq kilometres.

During the following years, ELF has played a significant role in the establishment of tens of other smaller protected areas in Estonia. ELF has carried on inventories of valuable habitats - wetlands, old-growth forests and meadows and participates in designing the Natura 2000 network of protected areas. In recent years ELF has more and more activities dedicated to environmental education, public awareness and public participation in environmental decisions and activities.

== Founders ==
1. Aare Mäemets
2. Ain Raitviir
3. Aivar Leito
4. Aleksander Heintalu
5. Andres Koppel
6. Andres Kuresoo
7. Andrus Ausmees
8. Ann Marvet
9. Helve Anton
10. Arne Kaasik
11. Eerik Leibak
12. Einar Tammur
13. Erik Sikk
14. Ervin Pihu
15. Fred Jüssi
16. Hans Trass
17. Indrek Rohtmets
18. Ivar Jüssi
19. Jaan Viidalepp
20. Jüri Keskpaik
21. Kalevi Kull
22. Kristjan Moora
23. Mart Jüssi
24. Mart Külvik
25. Mart Niklus
26. Martin Zobel
27. Mati Kaal
28. Nikolai Laanetu
29. Peeter Ernits
30. Aivo Pidim
31. Rein Kuresoo
32. Tiina Talvi
33. Tiit Maran
34. Tiiu Keskpaik
35. Tiiu Kull
36. Toomas Jüriado
37. Toomas Tiivel
38. Ülle Kukk
39. Vaike Hang
40. Veljo Ranniku
41. Vilju Lilleleht
