= List of Tartu University people =

This is a list of notable people associated with the University of Tartu at Tartu, Estonia.

== Notable lecturers and professors ==
=== Nobel laureate ===
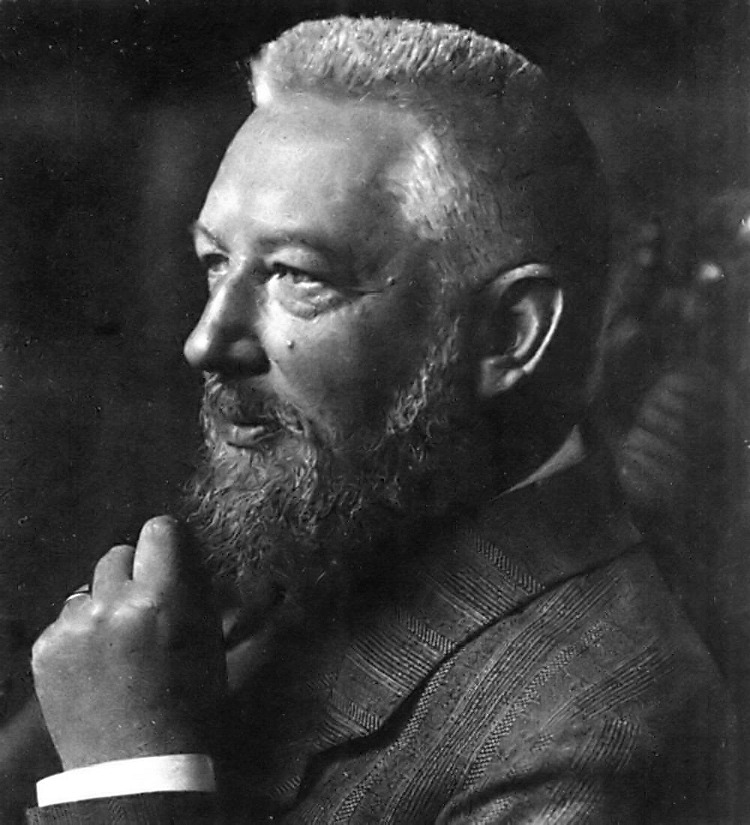
Wilhelm Ostwald

- Wilhelm Ostwald, Nobel Prize in Chemistry (1909)

=== Humanities and social sciences ===
- Jüri Allik, psychologist
- Walter Anderson, folklorist
- Paul Ariste, linguist
- Jan Baudouin de Courtenay, linguist
- Karl Bücher, economist and anthropologist
- August von Bulmerincq, legal scholar
- Vladimir Dal, lexicographer
- Gustav von Ewers, legal historian
- Lazar Gulkowitsch, Jewish Studies scholar, supported by Albert Einstein
- Theodosius Harnack, Lutheran theologian
- Siim Kallas, economist and politician (EU Commissioner; former Prime Minister)
- Andres Kasekamp, historian
- Emil Kraepelin, psychiatrist
- Jaan Kross, writer
- Kalevi Kull, biosemiotician
- Madis Kõiv, philosopher and physicist
- Helga Kurm, Dean of the Pedagogical Division
- Marju Lepajõe, classical philologist and religious historian
- Étienne Laspeyres, economist and statistician
- Wilhelm Lexis, economist, insurance scholar
- Eero Loone, philosopher
- Mihhail Lotman, semiotician
- Juri Lotman, semiotician, historian of literature
- Uku Masing, theologian and poet
- Zara Mints, literary scholar
- Johann Karl Simon Morgenstern, philologist
- Salme Nõmmik, economic geographer
- Alexander von Oettingen, Lutheran theologian, famous as statistics theoretician
- Ludwig Preller, philologist and antiquarian
- Villem Raam, art historian
- Konstantin Ramul, psychologist
- Leonid Stolovich, philosopher (aesthetic)
- Rein Taagepera, political scientist
- Gustav Teichmüller, philosopher
- Peeter Torop, semiotician
- Grigol Tsereteli, classicist and papyrologist
- Jüri Uluots, lawyer and politician
- Jaan Valsiner, psychologist
- Alexander Vasiliev, Byzantinist and Arabist
- Adolph Wagner, economist and social policy scholar

=== Natural science ===
- Marlon Dumas, computer scientist
- Wilhelm Anderson, astrophysicist
- Ernst von Bergmann, surgeon
- Friedrich Bidder, physiologist and anatomist
- Alexander Andrejewitsch von Bunge, botanist
- Karl Friedrich Burdach, biologist
- Jaan Einasto, astrophysicist
- Johann Friedrich von Eschscholtz, biologist and explorer
- Moses Wolf Goldberg, chemist
- Germain Henri Hess, chemist
- Jaan Kalviste, chemist, mineralogist, educator and translator
- Toomas Kivisild, geneticist
- Emil Kraepelin, psychiatrist
- Kalevi Kull, biologist
- Olevi Kull, ecologist
- Eerik Kumari, ornithologist
- Karl Wilhelm von Kupffer, anatomist, embryologist
- Carl Friedrich von Ledebour (professor of natural sciences, 1811–1836), botanist
- Anders Lindstedt (1854-1939) mathematician, astronomer and pioneer of actuarial science.
- Teodor Lippmaa, botanist
- Viktor Masing, ecologist
- Andres Metspalu, biotechnologist
- Carl Anton von Meyer, botanist
- Ferdinand Morawitz, entomologist
- Arthur von Oettingen, physicist
- Georg von Oettingen, physician
- Ernst Öpik, astronomer
- Georg Friedrich Parrot, physicist
- Riinu Rannap, zoologist
- August Rauber, anatomist
- Alma Johanna Ruubel, mathematician
- Matthias Jakob Schleiden, botanist
- Carl Schmidt, chemist
- Oswald Schmiedeberg, pharmacologist
- Peter Hermann Stillmark, founder of lectinology
- Friedrich Georg Wilhelm von Struve, astronomer
- Eduard Toll, polar explorer
- Ernst Rudolf von Trautvetter, botanist

== Notable alumni ==
- Khachatur Abovian, Armenian writer
- Karl Ernst von Baer, zoologist and "father" of embryology
- Kārlis Balodis, Latvian economist, author of the civilian rationing
- Krišjānis Barons, Latvian folklorist
- Haim Fishel Epstein (1874–1942), Lithuanian-American rabbi
- Pan Halippa, politician in Moldova and Romania
- Adolf von Harnack, Protestant theologian and science administrator
- Nicolai Hartmann, philosopher
- Germain Henri Hess, physician and chemist
- Jakob Hurt, folklorist
- Hermann Johansen, ornithologist
- Küllike Jürimäe, judge at the Court of Justice of the European Union
- Elise Käer-Kingisepp, physician and pharmacologist
- Wassily Kandinsky, abstract artist
- Jaan Kaplinski, poet
- Paul Keres, chess Grandmaster
- Woldemar Kernig, internist, neurologist
- Hermann von Keyserling, philosopher
- Alberts Kviesis, Latvian statesman
- Heinrich Lenz, physicist
- Anne Lill, classical philologist
- Emil Mattiesen (1875–1939), composer, pianist and philosopher
- Gerhard von Maydell (1835 – 1894), explorer, cartographer and ethnologist
- Lennart Meri, Estonian President
- Leo Michelson, Latvian-American painter
- Kārlis Mīlenbahs, Latvian linguist
- Stepanos Nazarian, Armenian publisher
- Karl Nikolai von Nolcken, clergyman and writer
- Tõnu Õnnepalu, author, poet
- Ernst Öpik, astronomer
- Friedrich Parrot, naturalist
- Juhan Parts, Estonian Economic and former Prime Minister
- Konstantin Päts, Estonian president
- Ion Pelivan, Foreign Minister of Moldova
- Kristjan Jaak Peterson, linguist
- Nikolay Pirogov, medical doctor
- Linda Poots, scientist and journalist
- Vera Poska-Grünthal, lawyer and feminist
- Georg von Rausch, historian
- Alfons Rebane, military commander
- Urmas Reinsalu (born 1975), politician
- Karl Ristikivi, writer
- Grigol Robakidze, Georgian writer
- Paul Saagpakk, linguist
- Alexander Schmidt (physiologist)
- Leopold von Schrenck, zoologist, geographer and ethnographer
- Josephine Serre, first woman to receive a dentistry degree from the University of Tartu, which occurred in 1814
- Otto Strandman, Estonian Prime Minister and Head of State
- Apolinary Szeluto, Polish composer
- Gustav Tammann, pioneer physical metallurgist
- A. H. Tammsaare, eminent Estonian writer
- Otto Tief, Estonian Prime Minister
- Jaanus Teppan, olympic cross-country skier
- Valentin Tomberg, "mystic" and "magician"
- Jakob von Uexküll, biologist
- Krišjānis Valdemārs, Latvian writer
- Mall Vaasma, mycologist
- Eduards Veidenbaums, Latvian poet

== Honorary doctorates ==
- Umberto Eco, semiotician and novelist
- Jan Niecisław Baudouin de Courtenay, linguist
- Tenzin Gyatso, 14th Dalai Lama
- Vello Helk, historian
- Otto Kaiser, Protestant theologian
- Ivan Pavlov, physiologist
- Arvo Pärt, classical composer
- Konstantin Päts, Estonian president
- Thure von Uexküll, semiotician and medical scientist
