= Tartu Students' Nature Conservation Circle =

Student organization based in Tartu, Estonia

Tartu Students' Nature Conservation Circle is a nature conservation organization (society) at the University of Tartu.

Established in 1958, it is the oldest student nature conservation society in the world.

It has been continuously active since then. As preparing the environmental activists of the country, it had a remarkable role in the Phosphorite War that influenced the destabilization and destruction of the Soviet Union in the end of 1980s.

Among the presidents of society there have been Toomas Frey, Ann Marvet, Mari Reitalu, Rein Ahas, Ülo Mander, Teet Jagomägi and many others.
