= Miia =

Miia may refer to:

== People ==
- Miia Hakala (b. 1987), Finnish artistic gymnast
- Miia Kivipelto (b. 1974), Finnish neuroscientist
- Miia Niemi (b. 1983), Finnish former footballer
- Miia Nuutila (b. 1972), Finnish television actress
- Miia Rannikmäe (b. 1951), Estonian chemist
- MIIA (b. 1997), Norwegian singer

== Fictional characters ==
- Miia, a character in the Japanese manga series Monster Musume
