= Lists of scientists =

This article contains links to lists of scientists.

== By academic genealogy ==
- Academic genealogy of chemists
- List of people considered father or mother of a scientific field
- List of the 72 names on the Eiffel Tower
- Apostles of Linnaeus
- List of Arab scientists and scholars
- List of modern Arab scientists and engineers
- List of archaeologists
- Astronomer Royal
- List of astronomers
- List of French astronomers
- List of Fellows of the Australian Academy of Science
- List of biologists
  - List of biochemists
  - List of carcinologists
  - List of coleopterists
  - List of entomologists
  - List of geneticists
  - List of herpetologists
  - List of immunologists
  - List of marine biologists
  - List of microbiologists
  - List of paleoethnobotanists
  - List of plant scientists
  - List of plant pathologists
- List of biophysicists
- List of Catholic clergy scientists
- List of lay Catholic scientists
- List of chemists
- List of Christians in science and technology
- List of Christian Nobel laureates
- List of Christian scientists and scholars of medieval Islam
- List of climate scientists
- List of women climate scientists and activists
- List of cognitive scientists
- List of computer scientists
- List of cosmologists
- List of criminologists
- List of ecologists
- List of Ethiopian scientists
- List of participants in the Evolving Genes and Proteins symposium
- List of Fellows of the Royal Society by election year
- List of foresters
- Fullerian Professor of Chemistry
- Fullerian Professor of Physiology
- List of geologists
- List of women geologists
- List of geophysicists
- List of Germans relocated to the US via the Operation Paperclip
- List of Jewish Nobel laureates
- List of Kyoto Prize winners
- List of atheists in science and technology
- List of loop quantum gravity researchers
- Maria Goeppert-Mayer Award
- List of medieval and pre-modern Persian doctors
- List of meteorologists
- List of mineralogists
- List of minor planet discoverers
- List of National Medal of Science laureates
- List of neurochemists
- List of neurologists and neurosurgeons
- List of nominees for the Nobel Prize in Chemistry
- List of physicians and scientists of Upstate New York
- List of ornithologists
- List of paleontologists
- List of pathologists
- List of pharmacists
- List of photochemists
- List of physicists
- List of plasma physicists
- List of presidents of the Geological Society of London
- List of presidents of the Geologists' Association
- List of psephologists
- Quakers in science
- List of quantum gravity researchers
- Racah Lectures in Physics
- List of Researchers at Racah Institute
- List of rheologists
- RNA Tie Club
- List of runologists
- Savilian Professor of Astronomy
- List of scientists whose names are used as units
- List of people whose names are used in chemical element names
- List of scientists whose names are used in physical constants
- List of soil scientists
- List of spectroscopists
- List of statisticians
- List of systems scientists
- List of taxonomic authorities by name
- List of undersea explorers
- List of authors of names published under the ICZN

== By country, religion, gender or ethnic background ==
- List of African educators, scientists and scholars
- List of Argentine scientists
- List of Armenian scientists and philosophers
  - List of African-American inventors and scientists
- List of Arab scientists and scholars
- List of Austrian scientists
- List of Azerbaijani scientists and philosophers
- List of Brazilian scientists
- List of Bangladeshi scientists
  - List of British Jewish scientists
  - List of Cornish scientists
  - List of Scottish scientists
  - List of Welsh scientists
- List of Byzantine scholars (including scientists)
- List of Chinese scientists
- List of Christian scientists
  - List of Catholic scientists
  - List of Christian Nobel laureates
  - List of Jesuit scientists
  - List of Roman Catholic cleric-scientists
  - List of Quaker scientists
- List of Croatian scientists
- List of Czech scientists
- List of Egyptian scientists
- List of Estonian scientists
- List of female scientists
  - List of female scientists before the 20th century
  - List of female scientists in the 20th century
  - List of female scientists in the 21st century
- List of French scientists
- List of Indian scientists
  - List of Tamil scientists
- List of Nepalese scientists
- List of Persian scientists and scholars
  - List of contemporary Iranian scientists, scholars, and engineers
- List of Italian scientists
- List of Jewish scientists and philosophers
- List of Jewish American chemists
- List of Muslim scientists
  - Lists of Muslim scientists and scholars
- List of New Zealand scientists
- List of Nigerian scientists and scholars
- List of Pakistani scientists
- List of Romanian scientists
- List of Russian scientists
- List of Serbian scientists
- List of Swedish scientists

== By achievement ==
- List of Nobel laureates
- Lists of Nobel laureates

== See also ==
- Academic genealogy
- History of science and technology
- List of forms of electricity named after scientists
- List of science communicators
