= Harald Haberman =

Estonian Soviet zoologist and politician

Harald Haberman (19 December 1904 Tallinn – 16 December 1986 Tartu) was an Estonian entomologist and politician.

In 1932 Haberman graduated from University of Tartu in biology. From 1935 to 1937 he was the chief editor of the journal Eesti Loodus.

In 1940 he was assistant of the internal minister in Johannes Vares' cabinet.

Haberman was the head of Estonian Institute of Zoology and Botany from 1947 to 1977 and was the chairman of Estonian Naturalists' Society from 1952 to1954.

He became a member of Estonian SSR Academy of Sciences in 1954.

== Awards ==
- 1964: Estonian SSR merited scientist
- 1971: Nikolai Vavilov medal
