= Aare Mäemets =

Estonian hydrobiologist, zoologist, limnologist, ecologist and nature photographer

Aare Mäemets (until 1936 Harry Michelson; 18 January 1929 Tallinn – 24 November 2002 Elva) was an Estonian hydrobiologist, zoologist, limnologist and nature photographer.

In 1954 he graduated from Tartu State University in biology. From 1955 until 1999, he worked at Estonian Institute of Zoology and Botany.

His main fields of research were Estonian lakes (including their limnological classification), estimation of lakes ecological conditions; he researched also water fleas.

Mäemets was married to hydrobotanist Aime Mäemets. Their daughter was biologist Helle Mäemets.

== Awards ==
- 1971: Soviet Estonia Prize
- 1990: Eerik Kumar Nature Conservation Award
- 2001: Order of the White Star, III class.

== Works ==
- 1960: "Eesti NSV vesikirbuliste fauna"
- 1968: "Eesti järved" (one of the authors)
- 1969: "Matk Eesti järvedele" (four editions)
- 1971: "Estonian Limnology"
- 1977: "Eesti NSV järved ja nende kaitse"
