= List of Welsh scientists =

A list of Welsh scientists.

- Granville Beynon, physicist
- Edward George Bowen, physicist
- Gareth Brenton, physicist and chemist
- Douglas Brewer, physicist
- David Brunt, meteorologist
- Ronald Burge, professor of physics
- Keith Burnett, physicist
- Kathleen E. Carpenter, freshwater ecologist
- Alan Cox, computer scientist
- Joan Curran, physicist
- Edgeworth David, geologist and Antarctic explorer
- Donald Davies, computer scientist and co-inventor of packet switching
- Rhisiart Morgan Davies, physicist
- Laurence Eaves, physicist
- Dianne Edwards, palaeobotanist
- Sam Edwards, physicist
- Lyn Evans, physicist
- William Frost, pioneer designer of aeroplanes
- David Edward Hughes, radio and audio pioneer
- Mary Gillham, naturalist
- John L. Harper, botanist
- Steve Jones, geneticist
- William Jones, mathematician
- Brian Josephson, theoretical physicist
- John Maddox, scientist and science journalist
- Lily Newton, botanist and vice-principal at the University of Wales
- Emyr Jones Parry, scientist and diplomat
- Robert Recorde, physician and mathematician
- Emlyn Rhoderick, solid state physicist
- David Roblin (physician), physician, pharma and biotech leader
- Bertrand Russell, philosopher, logician, mathematician, historian, and social critic
- John Meurig Thomas, solid state chemist
- Alfred Russel Wallace, naturalist, explorer, geographer, anthropologist, and evolutionary biologist

== See also ==
- Category:Welsh scientists
- List of scientists
