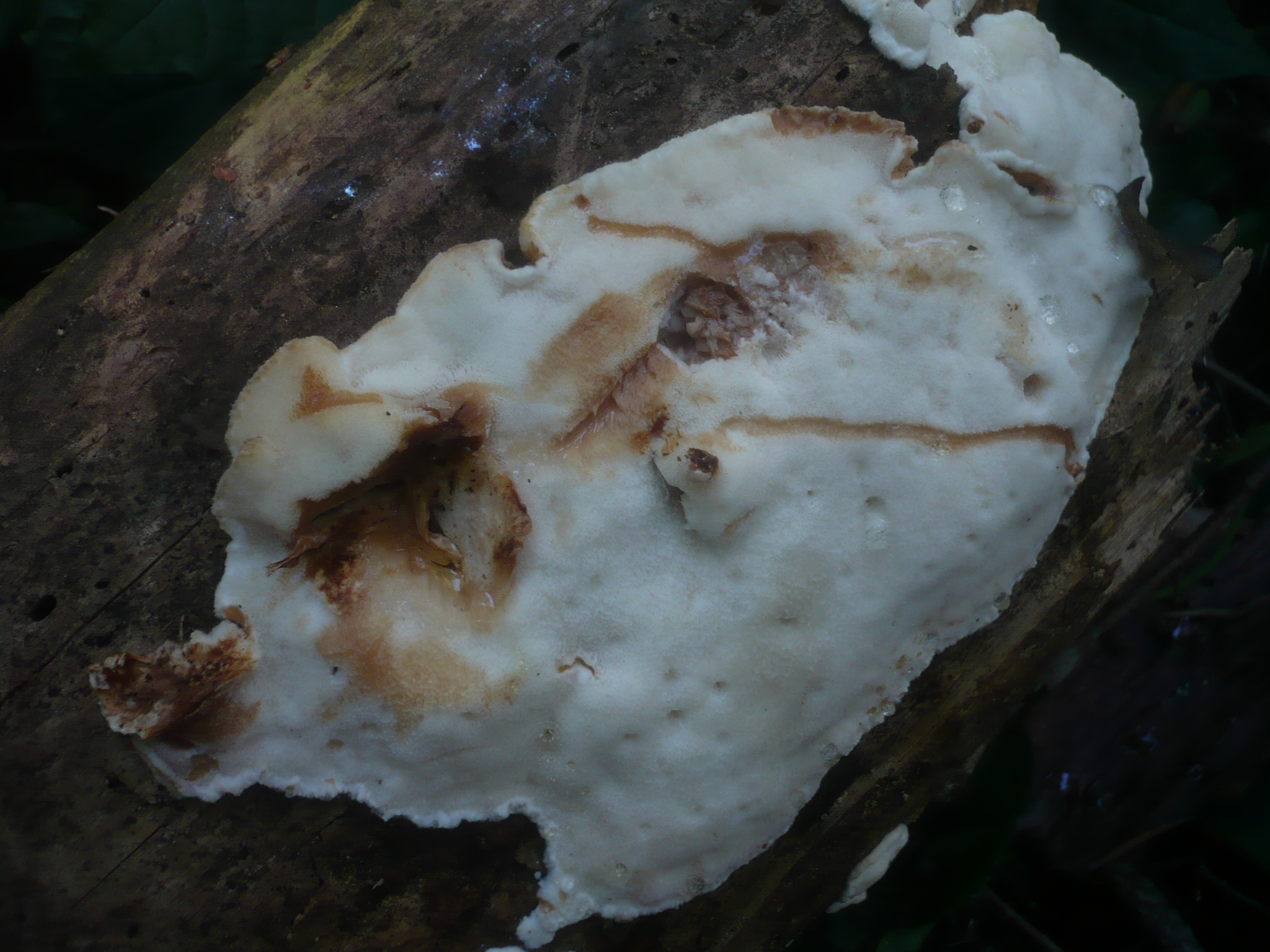
- Parmastomyces transmutans

Scientific classification
- Kingdom: Fungi
- Division: Basidiomycota
- Class: Agaricomycetes
- Order: Polyporales
- Family: Fomitopsidaceae
- Genus: Parmastomyces; Kotl. & Pouzar (1964)

Type species
- Parmastomyces kravtzevianus (Bondartsev & Parmasto) Kotl. & Pouzar (1964)

= Parmastomyces =

Genus of fungi

Parmastomyces is a genus of fungi in the family Fomitopsidaceae. The genus was circumscribed by Czech mycologists František Kotlaba and Zdenek Pouzar in 1964, with Tyromyces kravtzevianus Bondartzev & Parm. as the type species. Parmastomyces species cause a brown rot. The genus has a monomitic hyphal system.

The genus name of Parmastomyces is in honour of Erast Parmasto (1928–2012), who was an Estonian mycologist, bio-scientist and botanist and onetime director of the Estonian Institute of Zoology and Botany.

The genus was circumscribed by Paul Claude Silva in Taxon vol.8 on page 63 in 1959.

== Species ==
- Parmastomyces corticola Corner (1989)
- Parmastomyces deceptivus Corner (1989)
- Parmastomyces glutinosus Corner (1989)
- Parmastomyces kravtzevianus (Bondartsev & Parmasto) Kotl. & Pouzar (1964) – Europe
- Parmastomyces mollissimus (Maire) Pouzar (1984) – Europe
- Parmastomyces taxi (Bondartsev) Y.C.Dai & Niemelä (1995)
- Parmastomyces umbrinus Corner (1989)
