= Erich Kukk =

Estonian algologist and conservationist

- Erich Kukk (2016)
- Born: 26 October 1928; Misso Parish, Estonia
- Died: 17 November 2017 (aged 89)
- Scientific career
- Fields: phycology and conservation.
- Workplaces: Tartu University

Erich Kukk (26 October 1928 – 17 November 2017) was an Estonian phycologist and conservationist. Kukk is referred to as the Grand Old Man of Estonian Phycology.

== Early life ==
Kukk was born in Misso Parish, and graduated from the University of Tartu in 1953.

== Research ==
He has published research papers of cyanobacteria and green algae, contributed the Algae section of the "Estonian Red Book" established in 1998. and has written about water pollution and treatment options.

Kukk travelled widely during his fieldwork including the Carpathians, polar Urals, Central Asia, Altai, Mongolia Finland, Lapland, in the mountains, deserts as well as tundra.

== Honours and awards ==
In 1982, he was awarded the National Prize of the Academy of Sciences of the Estonian SSR.

== Personal life ==
He was married to botanist Ülle Kukk.
