= Madis Aruja =

Estonian conservationist, geographer and ski-orienteer

Madis Aruja (16 January 1936, Kuigatsi, Otepää Parish – 12 March 1995, Tallinn) was an Estonian conservationist, geographer and ski-orienteer. He worked in the fields of nature conservation and fish protection in the Estonian SSR before being fired for speaking out against the Estonian Soviet government. He was also an accomplished ski-orienteer.

== Biography ==
In 1954, Aruja graduated from Jõgeva Secondary School and from the Department of Geography from the University of Tartu in 1963.

From 1963, Aruja worked in the field of nature conservation and fish protection. From 1963 to 1981, he worked as Senior Inspector of the Estonian SSR Ministry of Forestry and Nature Protection, was a member of the Nature Protection Board from 1963 to 1967, and in 1967, was made Deputy Head of the Nature Protection Government.

In 1980, Aruja was one of the signatories of the Letter of 40 Intellectuals. As a result, he lost his job from the Nature Protection Government. From 1982 to 1992, he worked as the chief specialist in nature conservation in the Estonian Agricultural Project. He died in 1995 in Tallinn.

== Athletic record ==
From 1959 to 1970, Aruja earned 10 gold (8 orienteering runs and 2 ski orienteering), 5 silver and 2 bronze medals in ski orienteering as well as winning the Estonian championship.

In 1960, he became the first Estonian champion in ski orienteering. He became a master in ski orienteering in 1968.

== Publications ==
- Käitumisest looduses. Tallinn: Eesti Raamat, 1981 (koostaja)
- Eesti NSV looduse kaitsest. Tallinn: Perioodika, 1983
- Pilte looduskaitsealadelt. Fotoalbum. Tallinn: Eesti Raamat, 1983 (teksti autor)

== Awards ==
- 1960, 1962, 1964: Best Estonian orientalist
- 1994: Eerik Kumari Award
