= Aaspere =

Village in Estonia

Coordinates: 59°25′N 26°07′E

- Village
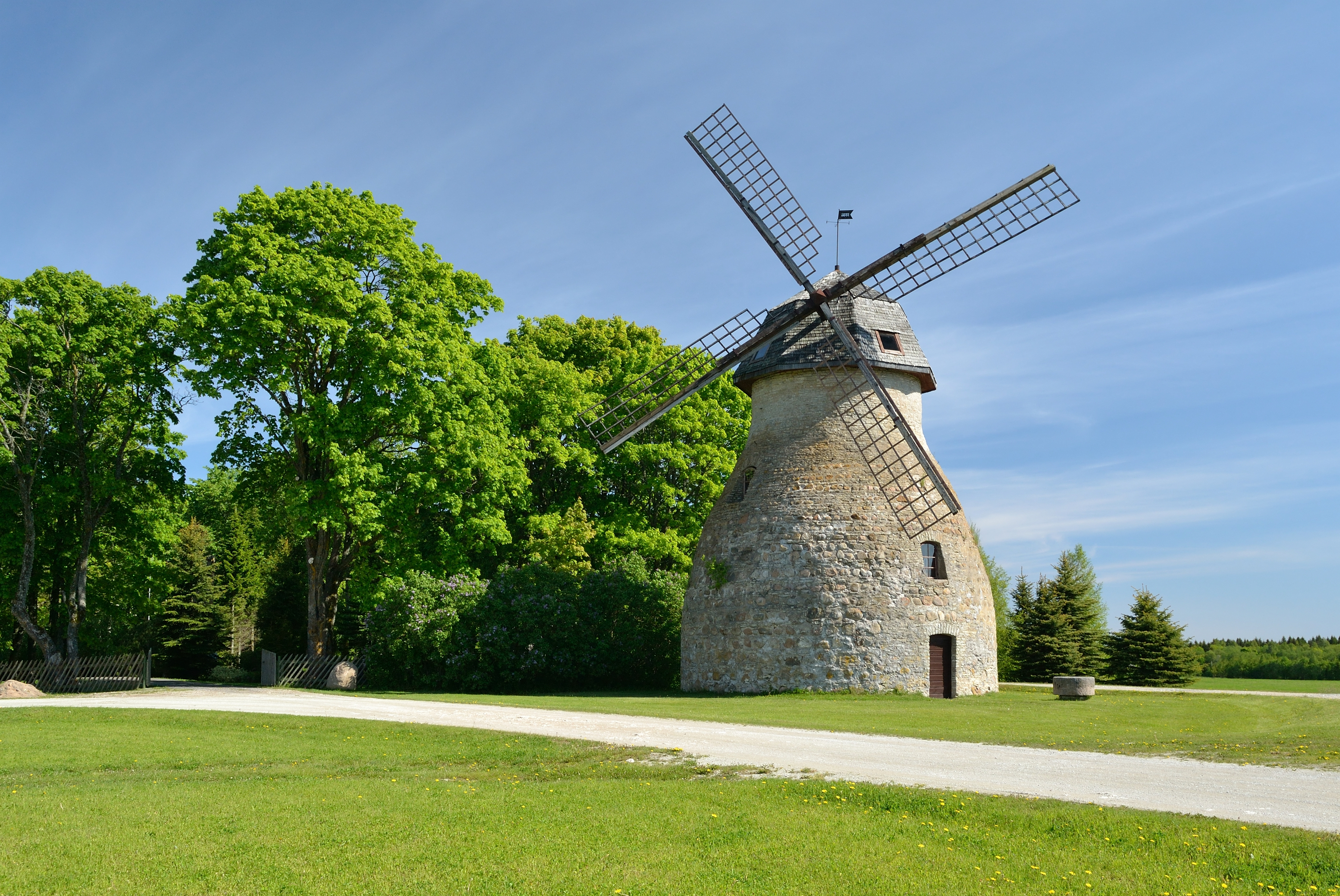
- Aaspere manor windmill

- Location within Estonia
- Country: Estonia
- County: Lääne-Viru County
- Parish: Haljala Parish
- Time zone: UTC+2 (EET)
  - Summer (DST): UTC+3 (EEST)

Aaspere is a village in Haljala Parish, Lääne-Viru County, in northeastern Estonia. It is about 20 kilometres from Rakvere.

== Name ==
Aaspere was attested in historical sources as Katkantagus in 1241, Kattentacken in 1498, Aastwerre in 1732, and Haasper in 1913, among other spellings. The original name of the village, *Katkutaguse, has been preserved in the German name of the manor, Kattentack (from katk 'quagmire, low marshy place, swampy area' + tagune 'located behind'). Aaspere is an Estonianized form of the family name Hastferite (or Hastever), dating back to the Danish period. According to Paul Johansen, the Hastferite family originated in Westphalia, and the name refers to a place called Haversvörde.

== Aaspere manor ==
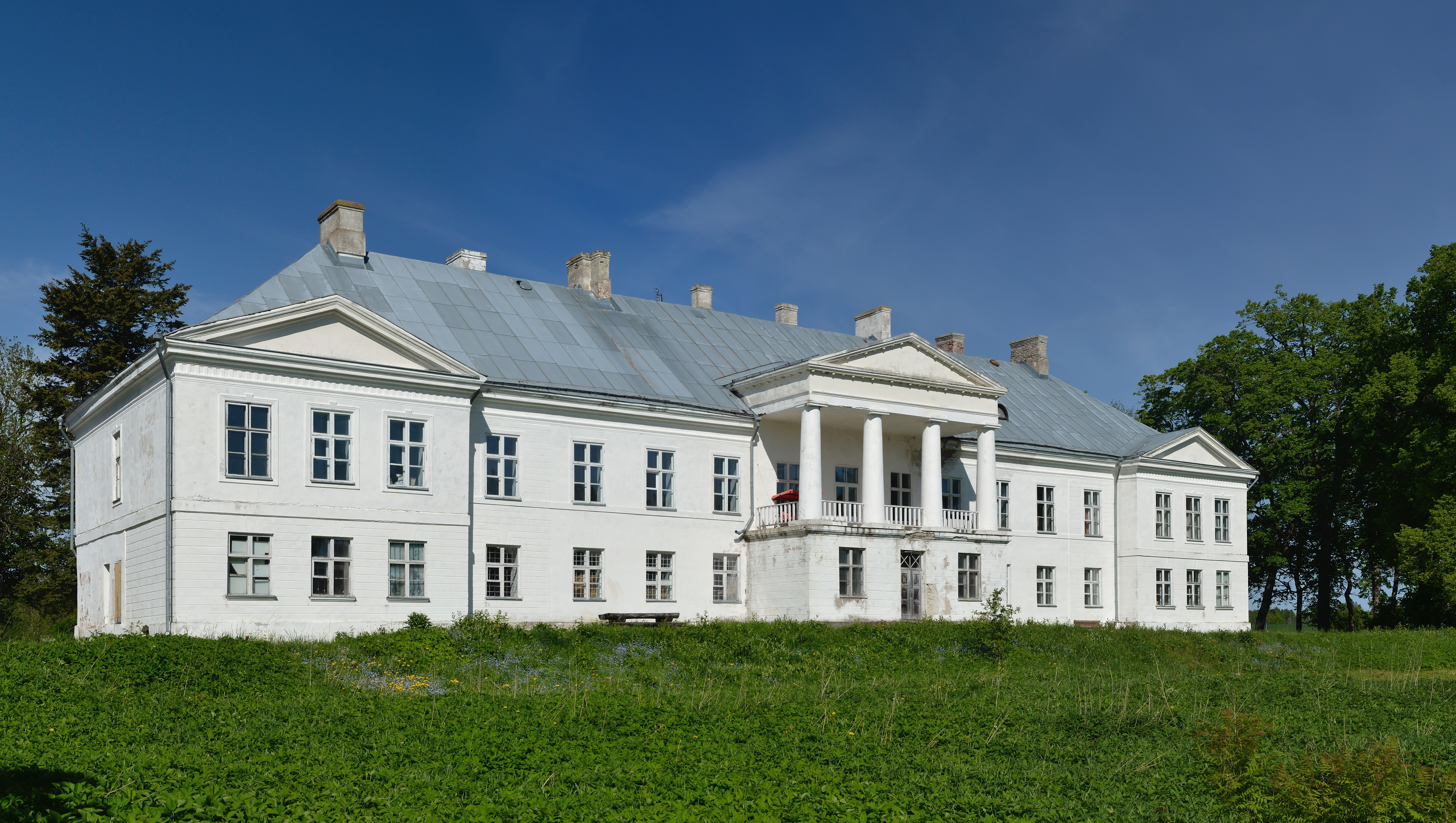
Aaspere manor

Aaspere manor (German: Kattentack) was mentioned for the first time in the 16th century. The current building received its appearance around 1800. The manor is one of the finest examples in Estonia of neoclassical manor house architecture. The manor was damaged in a fire in 1966. The manor is surrounded by a grandly designed park.

The last owner before the Estonian land reform in 1919 was Eduard von Dellingshausen, who was a strong supporter of the idea of creating a German-dominated United Baltic Duchy after World War I.

== Notable residents ==
Aaspere was the birthplace of physician and botanist Bernhard Saarsoo (1899–1964).
