= Mikk Murdvee =

Estonian-Finnish conductor and violinist

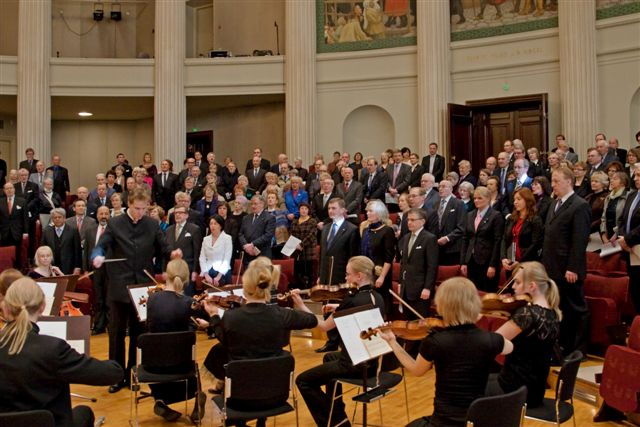
Mikk Murdvee conducting at University of Helsinki, 2008.

Mikk Murdvee (born March 20, 1980) is an Estonian-Finnish conductor and violinist living in Helsinki, Finland.

== Education ==
Mikk Murdvee was born in Tallinn. He studied violin in Tallinn Music High School (1986–1998), Estonian Academy of Music and Theatre and Sibelius Academy (1999–2005), graduating from the latter with highest possible marks.

He started conducting studies privately with Atso Almila in 2000. 2002–2007 he studied in Sibelius Academy conducting class, where his teachers were Leif Segerstam, Atso Almila and Jorma Panula plus many other visiting teachers. In addition he has taken part of master classes (including Neeme Järvi Summer Academy) with Neeme Järvi, Paavo Järvi, Eri Klas, J.Panula, L.Segerstam, Leonid Grin and Juozas Domarkas, conducting Estonian National Symphony Orchestra, Finnish Radio Symphony orchestra, Pärnu City Orchestra, Orchestra of Theatre "Vanemuine" and St.Petersburg Festival Orchestra.

== Work experience ==
He has conducted Estonian National Symphony Orchestra, Sibelius Academy Symphony Orchestra, Oulu Symphony Orchestra, Tampere Filharmonia, City Orchestras of Joensuu, Vaasa, Lappeenranta and Seinäjoki, Pori Sinfonietta, Heinola Sinfonietta, Tallinn Chamber Orchestra, Pärnu City Orchestra, Haapsalu City Orchestra and many other orchestras. He has been assistant conductor in Tampere Opera, assisting Eri Klas in production of Verdi's "Otello" in 2005, Andris Nelsons in Donizetti's "L'elisir d'Amore" in 2006 and Giancarlo Andretta in Verdi's "Aida" 2007. He has conducted Lehar's "Die Lustige Witwe" in Kerava Opera in 2005, and had his own production in Pori Opera in autumn 2006.

He made his Estonian National Opera debut in spring 2007 conducting Lövenskiold's La Sylphide. He has been reinvited to conduct the same production and in addition to that, Tchaikovsky's Nutcracker in 2007 and 2008. He also conducts highly successful Tibor Kocsak's Snow White and 7 Dwarfs at the same house. In January 2009 he conducted there multiple performances of Rossini's La cenerentola at short notice with only one rehearsal.

In June 2010 he conducted the world premiere of Ilkka Kuusisto's opera Taipaleenjoki at festival Ilmajoen Musiikkijuhlat. It received very good critiques and all performances were sold out. The opera returned to the same festival at June 2011 and in June 2012.

Mikk Murdvee was appointed assistant conductor of Helsinki University Symphony Orchestra Ylioppilaskunnan Soittajat (YS) 2005–2007. He started as principal conductor of YS in August 2007.

Since January 2011 he has several times worked as an assistant to Esa-Pekka Salonen and the Philharmonia Orchestra.

== Personal ==
Mikk Murdvee is the son of Estonian psychologist and scholar Mart Murdvee and violin pedagogue Niina Murdvee.
