= Liiva-Putla Nature Reserve =

Protected area in Estonia

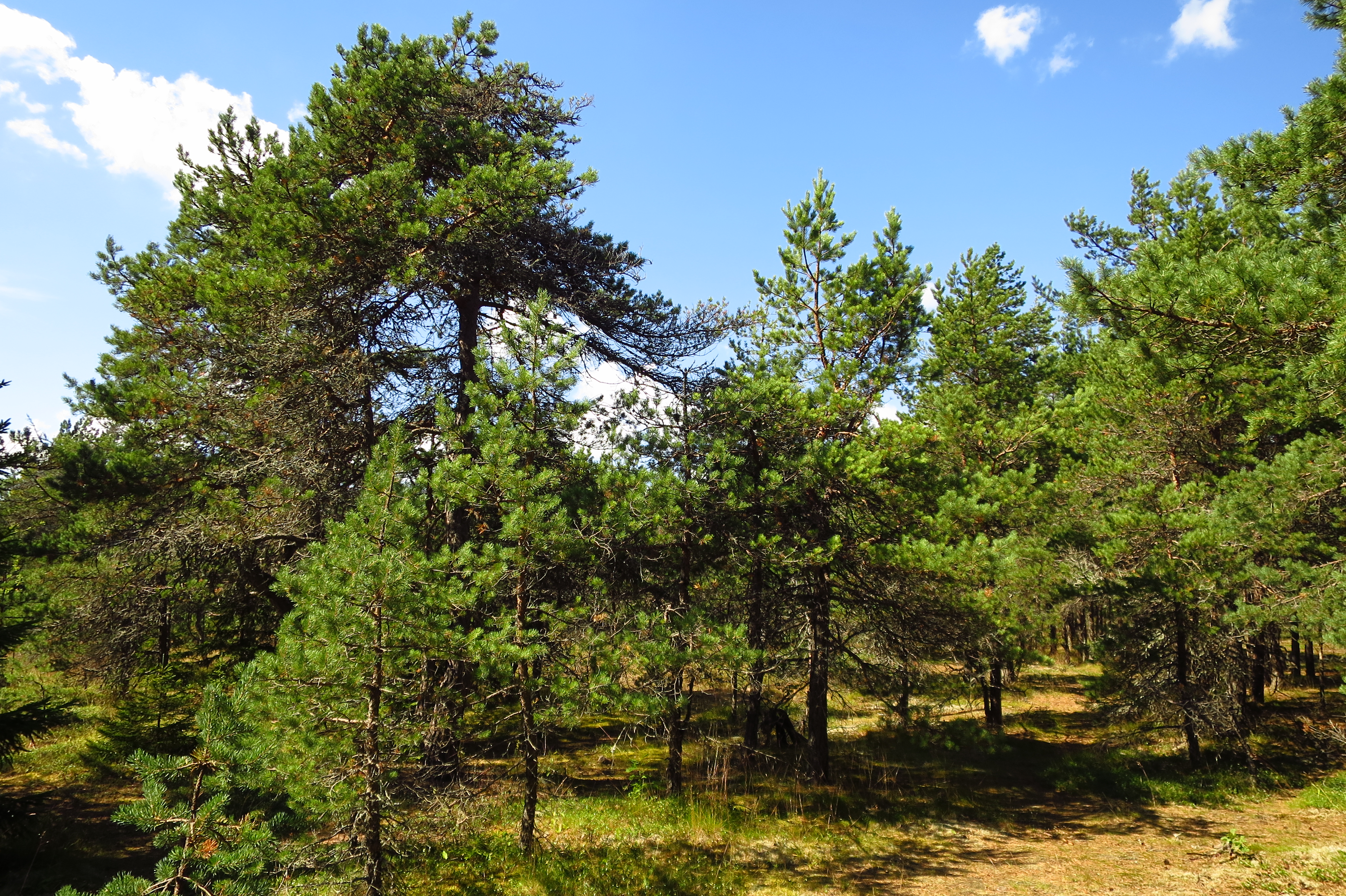

- Location within Estonia
- Location: Estonia
- Nearest city: Kuressaare
- Coordinates: 58°24′50″N 22°38′48″E
- Area: 101 ha (250 acres)
- Established: 2007

Liiva-Putla Nature Reserve is a nature reserve situated on Saaremaa island in western Estonia, in Saare County.

Liiva-Putla Nature Reserve is one of only five nature reserves in Europe created for the protection of fungi. Estonian mycologist Erast Parmasto was one of the main people behind its creation. Today it forms part of the EU-wide Natura 2000-network and contains twelve rare species of fungi.
