= Ramma =

Village in Estonia

Coordinates: 59°02′N 26°01′E

- Village
- Interactive map of Ramma
- Country: Estonia
- County: Järva County
- Parish: Järva Parish
- Time zone: UTC+2 (EET)
  - Summer (DST): UTC+3 (EEST)

Ramma is a village in Järva Parish, Järva County in northern-central Estonia.

Ramma is the birthplace of botanist Kaljo Pork (1930–1981).
