= Estonian Institute of Zoology and Botany =

Institute in Tartu, Estonia

- Zooloogia ja Botaanika Instituut
- Active: 1947–2004
- Affiliations: Estonian University of Life Sciences (1997–2004)
- Location: Riia 181, Tartu, Estonia (1995–2004), Tartu, Estonia; 58°21′24″N 26°40′44″E
- Website: www.zbi.ee

The Estonian Institute of Zoology and Botany (Estonian: Zooloogia ja Botaanika Instituut) (ZBI) was a zoological and botanical research institute based in Tartu, Estonia. It was founded in 1947. Since 1997, it belonged to the Estonian University of Life Sciences as a central biological research institute in the country. On January 1, 2005 it was merged into the Institute of Agricultural and Environmental Sciences.

The Institute of Zoology and Botany was the only research unit in Estonia to administer and distribute data and expertise on taxonomic composition in the country. It provided data on the country's flora, microevolution of vegetation, naturalisation, the invasion of non-native species and vegetation population dynamics.

The scholars who have worked in this institute include Jaan Eilart, Toomas Frey, Andres Koppel, Toomas Kukk, Ülle Kukk, Kalevi Kull, Olevi Kull, Tiiu Kull, Eerik Kumari, Vilma Kuusk, Liivia Laasimer, Malle Leht, Aime Mäemets, Ingmar Ott, Erast Parmasto, Kaljo Pork, Haide-Ene Rebassoo, et al.

== Directors ==
- Harald Haberman (1947–1977),
- Kalju Paaver (1977–1985),
- Erast Parmasto (1985–1990),
- Andres Koppel (1990–1996),
- Urmas Tartes (1996–2004).
