= Vilma Kuusk =

Estonian botanist (1931–2024)

Vilma Kuusk (9 February 1931 – 9 April 2024) was an Estonian botanist. She dealt with the flora of Estonia.

Kuusk was the senior curator of Estonian Institute of Zoology and Botany's herbarium.

She described at least one taxon: subtribe Alliariinae Kuusk, 1973.

Kuusk died on 9 April 2024, at the age of 93.
