= Aime Mäemets =

Estonian scientist

- Born: 1930
- Died: 1996 (aged 65–66)
- Education: University of Tartu
- Spouse: Aare Mäemets
- Scientific career
- Fields: Botanist; Hydrobiologist
- Workplaces: Estonian Institute of Zoology and Botany

Aime Mäemets (1930 – 1996) was an Estonian botanist and hydrobiologist. She conducted considerable research into Lake Peipus and was known for her study of Macrophytes. She finished University of Tartu in 1954. From 1961 to 1996 she worked in Estonian Institute of Zoology and Botany and was a well-known specialist of Potamogetonaceae plants.

Mäemets was married to hydrobotanist Aare Mäemets. Their daughter was biologist Helle Mäemets.
