= Linda Poots =

Estonian zoologist and journalist

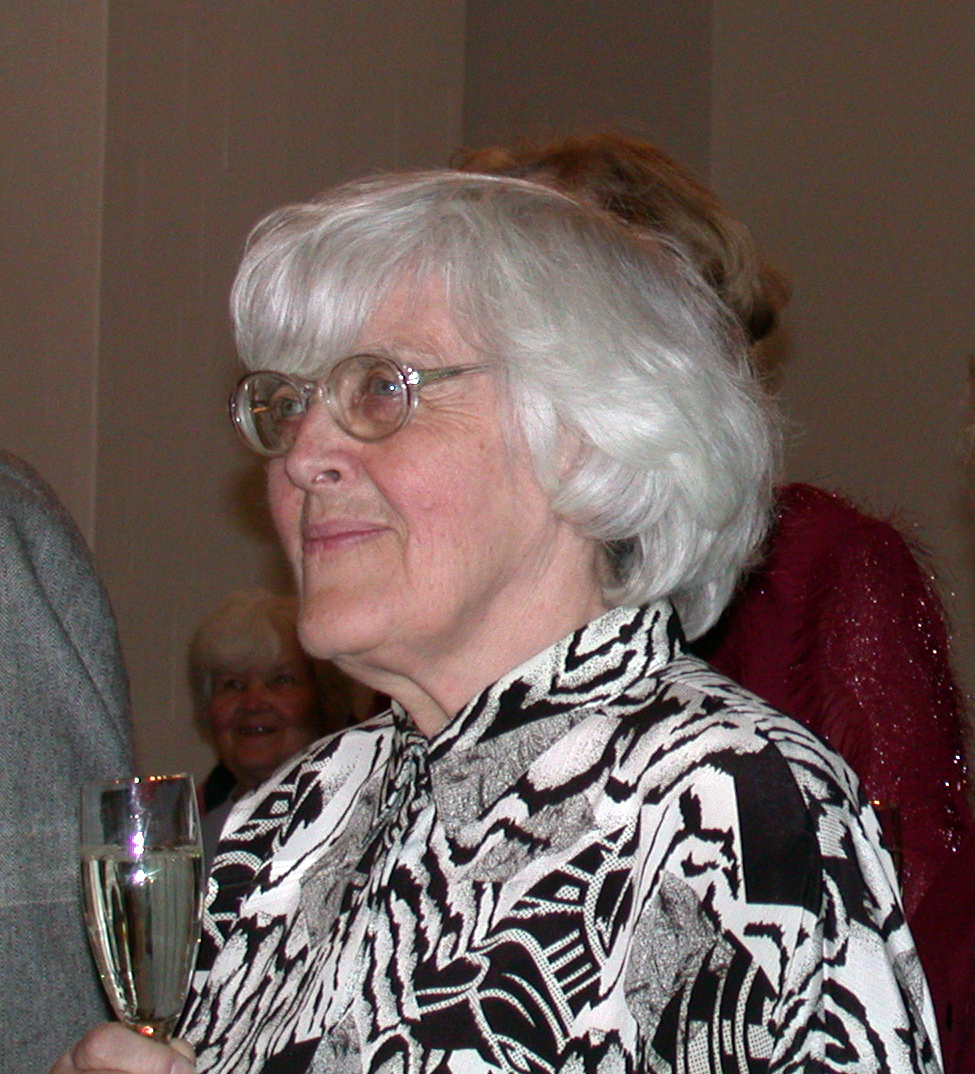
- Linda Poots at the University of Tartu in 2005
- Born: March 25, 1929; Tartu, Estonia
- Died: July 10, 2015 (aged 86)
- Scientific career
- Fields: Zoology

Linda Poots (March 25, 1929 – July 10, 2015) was an Estonian zoologist and journalist known for her work with bats. She was the longtime editor of the Estonian nature magazine Eesti Loodus.

== Biography ==
Linda Poots was born in 1929 in Tartu, Estonia.

After high school, she attended the University of Tartu, where she began studying bats. She then studied zoology at Moscow State University, graduating in 1952.

From 1948 onward, Poots made pioneering scientific observations of bats hibernating in Estonian caves. She went on to author many papers on bats in her country. At her urging, bat hibernation sites at Piusa and near Tallinn were protected by the Estonian Soviet Socialist Republic in the 1980s.

From 1952 to 1957, she taught in the Department of Zoology and Entomology at the Estonian Academy of Agriculture in Tartu, now the Estonian University of Life Sciences.

She was a co-founder and the longtime editor in chief of the nature magazine Eesti Loodus, from 1957 until her retirement in 1984. She wrote numerous articles on zoology and travel for this and other publications, and worked as an editor and translator of books on nature.

In 1966, Poots became a founding member of the Estonian Nature Conservation Society.

After retiring from Eesti Loodus, Poots worked in the Tartu University Library from 1984 to 1999, helping classify zoological and medical literature.

Poots married fellow scientist Viktor Masing in 1952. The couple's jointly written travelogue Tuhat tutvust tundrast kõrbeni was published in 1970. She also frequently collaborated with their son, biologist Matti Masing.

She died in 2015 at age 86.
