= Ingmar Ott =

Estonian botanist

Ingmar Ott (born 14 September 1955) is an Estonian botanist.

He was born in Tartu.

In 1980, he graduated from the University of Tartu in biology. In 1984, he became affiliated with the Estonian Institute of Zoology and Botany.

1992–2001 he was the head of Võrtsjärv Limnology Centre.
