= Bernhard Saarsoo =

Estonian-Swedish physician and botanist

Bernhard Saarsoo (8 July 1899 – 29 June 1964) was an Estonian and Swedish physician and botanist.

Saarsoo was born in Aaspere, Haljala Parish in the former Russian Empire. He published a number of notable papers on his studies in the 1930s including Uus robiheinaliik Eestis (1933) and Floristilisi märkmeid IV (1938).

He lived and worked in exile in Växjö, Sweden beginning in 1944, when he fled from the Soviet invasion and occupation of Estonia.
