= Victor Aladjev =

Estonian mathematician and cybernetician

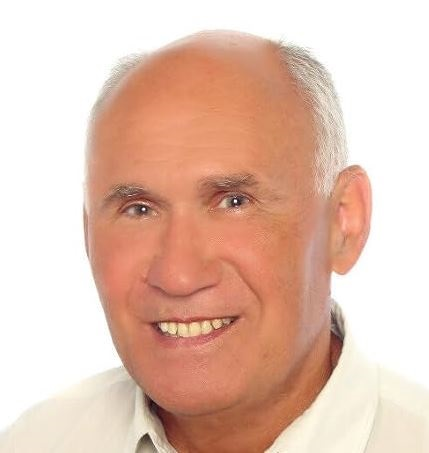
- Born: 14 June 1942; Grodno, USSR
- Died: 9 April 2025; Tallinn, Estonia
- Citizenship: USSR; Estonia
- Education: University of Grodno; University of Tartu
- Known for: Theory of homogeneous structures
- Awards: Gold Medal European Quality by the European Scientific & Industrial Consortium (ESIC)
- Scientific career
- Fields: Mathematics; Cybernetics
- Workplaces: International Academy of Noosphere
- Thesis: Mathematical Theory of Homogeneous Structures and Their Applications
- Doctoral advisor: Richard E. Bellman

Victor Zakharovich Aladjev (Belarusian: Віктар Захаравіч Алад'еў; born June 14, 1942 - dead April 9, 2025) was an Estonian mathematician and cybernetician, creator of the scientific school on the theory of homogeneous structures.

== Early life and education ==
Victor Aladjev was born in 1942 in Grodno to parents Zakhar Ivanovich Aladjev and Maria Adolfovna Novogrotska. His father participated in the underground resistance organization during World War II while in German-occupied Grodno.

Aladjev attended University of Grodno in 1959, later transferring to the University of Tartu, Estonia in 1962, where he earned his degree in mathematics in 1966. Subsequently, he entered the graduate school of the Estonian Academy of Sciences in 1969, achieving a doctorate in mathematics (DSc) in 1972, specializing in Theoretical Cybernetics and Technical Cybernetics. His doctoral work focused on the mathematical theory of homogeneous structures, resulting in the award of a DSc under the guidance of Professor Richard E. Bellman.

== Scientific career ==
In 1970, Aladjev became the President of the Tallinn Research Group (TRG), contributing to the mathematical theory of homogeneous structures, particularly Cellular Automata (CA). Between 1972 and 1990, Aladjev held various senior positions in design, technological, and research organizations in Tallinn.

His involvement in international mathematical publications includes serving as a referent and editorial board member for Zentralblatt für Mathematik since 1972 and being a member of International Association of Mathematical Modeling (IAMM) since 1980. In 1993, he was elected to the International Federation for Information Processing (IFIP) working group on the mathematical theory of homogeneous structures and its applications.

In 1994, Aladjev was honored with election as an academician of the Russian Academy of Cosmonautics and the International Academy of Noosphere (IAN). The following year, in 1995, he achieved full membership in the Russian Academy of Natural Sciences (RANS). By 1998, he rose to the position of First Vice-president of the IAN.

== Research ==
Aladjev is the author of more than 500 scientific works, including 90 monographs, textbooks, and articles. Particularly noteworthy is his 1972 monograph on the theory of homogeneous structures, acknowledged as one of the finest monographic publications by the Estonian Academy of Sciences. It received recognition in the Encyclopedia of Physical Science and Technology. This monograph not only unveiled numerous original findings, but also introduced fundamental terminology on cellular automata, now widely accepted in the field.

Aladjev is a member of the editorial boards of a number of scientific journals. He created the Estonian School for the mathematical theory of homogeneous structures, whose fundamental results received international recognition and have made certain contributions in the basis of a new division of the modern mathematical cybernetics. He also created the UserLib6789 library of new software (more than 850 tools) for which he was won the Smart Award network award, and a large unified MathToolBox package (more than 1420 tools) for Maple and Mathematica systems.

As part of the Visiting Professor program, Aladjev collaborated with various universities in the computer science, delivering lectures on Maple and Mathematica systems. In recognition of his contributions, he was awarded the Gold Medal European Quality in May 2015 by the European Scientific & Industrial Consortium (ESIC).

== Personal life ==
Apart from his academic pursuits, Aladjev actively participated in the annual international sport events (Spartakiad) from 1976 to 1990, achieving success and winning several medals in athletics and volleyball.

== Selected publications ==
- Computability in homogeneous structures. V Aladyev, Izv. Akad. Nauk. Estonian SSR, Fiz.-Mat, 1972
- Survey of research in the theory of homogeneous structures and their applications. V Aladyev, Mathematical Biosciences, 1974.
- Mathematical Theory of Homogeneous Structures and Their Applications. Victor Alajev. Valgus Press, Tallinn, 1980.
- Computer laboratory for engineering researches. VZ Aladjev, ML Shishakov, TA Trokhova, Intern. Conf. ACA-2000.–Saint-Petersburg, Russia, 2000.
- A workstation for solution of systems of differential equations. VZ Aladjev, ML Shishakov, TA Trokhova - 3rd Int., 2000.
- Educational computer laboratory of the engineer. VZ Aladjev, ML Shishakov, TA Trokhova - Proc. 8th Byelorussia Mathemat. Conf, 2000.
- Maple 6: Solution of the Mathematical, Statistical and Engineering–Physical Problems. V Aladjev, M Bogdevicius, Laboratory of Basic Knowledge's, Moscow, 2001.
- New software for mathematical package Maple of releases 6, 7 and 8. V Aladjev, M Bogdevičius, O Prentkovskis, Technika, 2002.
- Classical cellular automata. Homogeneous structures. Aladjev, V., Fultus Books, 2010. ISBN 9781596822221
- Classical cellular automata: Mathematical theory and applications. Aladjev, V., Scholar's Press, 2014. ISBN 9783639713459
- Toolbox for the Mathematica programmers. V. Aladjev, V. Vaganov., CreateSpace Independent Publishing Platform, 2016. ISBN 9781532748837
- Software Etudes in the Mathematica: Tallinn Research Group. Aladjev, Victor; Shishakov, Michael, CreateSpace Independent Publishing Platform, 2017. ISBN 1979621888
- Selected problems in the theory of classical cellular automata. Aladjev, Victor Zachar; Shishakov, Michael Leonid; Vaganov, Vjacheslav Alexei, Independently published, 2018. ISBN 173095037X
- Functional and procedural programming in Mathematica. Aladjev, V.; Shishakov, M.; Vaganov, V., TRG press, 2020. ISBN 9949018838
- Cellular automata, mainframes, Maple, Mathematica and computer science in Tallinn Research Group. Aladjev, V., Kindle Press, 2022. ISBN 9798447660208
