= Erast Parmasto =

Estonian mycologist (1928–2012)

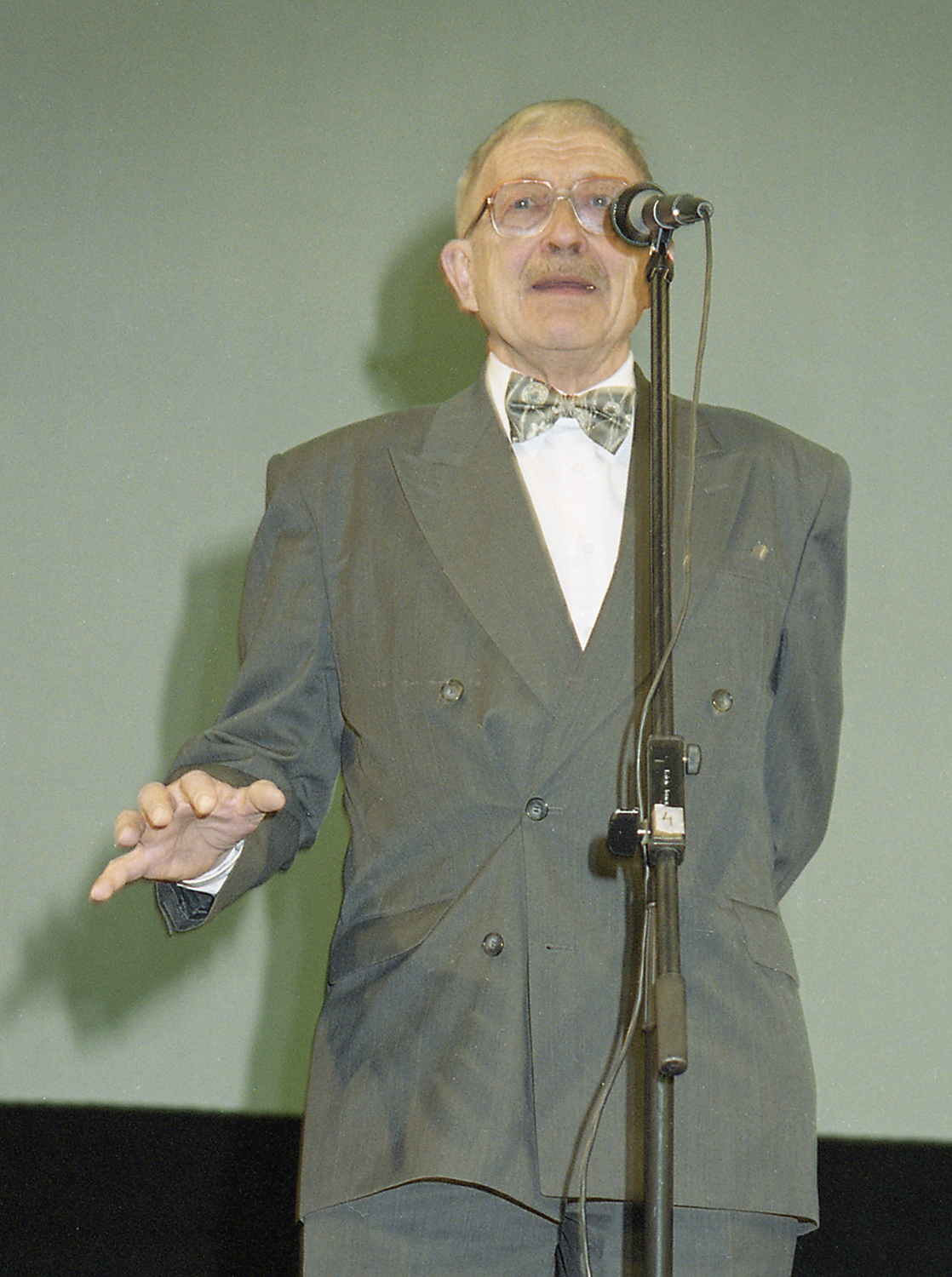
Erast Parmasto, 2001

Erast Parmasto (28 October 1928 – 24 April 2012) was a noted Estonian mycologist, bioscientist and botanist and onetime director of the Estonian Institute of Zoology and Botany.

Parmasto was born in Nõmme. He became a member of the Estonian Institute of Zoology and Botany in 1950 and served as its director from 1985 to 1990. His establishment of a mushroom herbarium in 1950 has since seen recognition of 160,000 samples, 37,000 of which Parmasto himself collected.

Parmasto published more than 150 papers and 200 articles during his academic career and his works are commonly used in popular scientific and academic journals in Estonia. He issued two exsiccatae, namely Eesti seente eksikaat. Mycotheca Estonica. Gerbarij gribov Estonii (1957 to 1961) and Corticiaceae URSS (1965 to 1969). His expertise in the field of mycology has resulted in him being nicknamed "Seenevana", or the "grand old man of mushrooms". As a mycologist, the field with which Parmasto was most associated, he was best known for his establishment and enhancement of databases for species of mushrooms within Estonia. He was also the author of the first Estonian-language textbook on biosystematics in history.

Parmesto was furthermore one of the driving forces behind the establishment of Liiva-Putla Nature Reserve, one of only five areas created for the protection of mushrooms in Europe.

He served as the president of the Estonian Naturalists' Society between 1973 and 1976 and was an honorary member of the society from 1988. Between 1973 and 1981 he was also the academic secretary in the Department of Chemical, Geological and Biological Sciences of the Estonian Academy of Sciences. He would later work as a Professor of Botany and Ecology at the University of Tartu from 1987 to 1995.

Parmasto worked as the senior researcher in the Mycology Department of the Institute of Agricultural and Environmental Sciences at the Estonian University of Life Sciences.

== Awards ==
He was a recipient of the Karl Ernst von Baer medal in 1976. In 1994 he won the National Science Prize from the Yearly Award, Culture and Society, and in 2002, was awarded the honorable Lifetime Achievement Award in Biosciences and the Environment again. In 2008 he was given the Eerik Kumari Award for his contributions to Bioscience. Jaanus Kala, Deputy Secretary-General of the Ministry of the Environment and chairman of the award's jury said of the scientist, “Erast Parmasto has dedicated his life’s work to studying nature and to promoting its protection among the public”.

In 1964, Czech mycologists František Kotlaba and Zdenek Pouzar, together circumscribed the fungal genus of Parmastomyces (in the family Fomitopsidaceae), it was named in his honour.

Erastia is a fungal genus in the family Polyporaceae. It is a monotypic genus, containing the single European species Erastia salmonicolor. Erastia was circumscribed by Finnish mycologists Tuomo Niemelä and Juha Kinnunen in 2005 and also named in his honour.

== Publications ==
Some of Parmasto's more important publications include:

- D. S. Hibbett, M. Binder, J. F. Bischoff, M. Blackwell, P. F. Cannon, O. E. Eriksson, S. Huhndorf, T. James, P. M. Kirk, R. Lücking, H. T. Lumbsch, F. Lutzoni, P. B. Matheny, D. J. McLaughlin, M. J. Powell, S. Redhead, C. L. Schoch, J. W. Spatafora, J. A. Stalpers, R. Vilgalys, M. C. Aime, A. Aptroot, R. Bauer, D. Begerow, G. L. Benny, L. A. Castlebury, P. W. Crous, Y.-C. Dai, W. Gams, D. M. Geiser, G. W. Griffith, C. Gueidan, D. L. Hawksworth, G. Hestmark, K. Hosaka, R. A. Humber, K. D. Hyde, J. E. Ironside, U. Kõljalg, C. P. Kurtzman, K.-H. Larsson, R. Lichtwardt, J. Longcore, J. Miadlikowska, A. Miller, J.-M. Moncalvo, S. Mozley-Standridge, F. Oberwinkler, E. Parmasto, V. Reeb, J. D. Rogers, C. Roux, L. Ryvarden, J. P. Sampaio, A. Schüßler, J. Sugiyama, R. G. Thorn, L. Tibell, W. A. Untereiner, C. Walker, Z. Wang, A. Weir, M. Weiss, M. M. White, K. Winka, Y.-J. Yao and N. Zhang. A higher-level phylogenetic classification of the fungi. Mycological Research 111: 509-547, 2007
- Distribution maps of Estonian fungi (3. osa) Eesti seente levikuatlas. Pore Fungi. Estonian Academy Publishers, 2004
- Parmasto, E : Integrating molecular and morphological data in the systematics of fungi. - In: Randlane, T/Saag, A (eds.): Book of Abstracts of the 5th IAL Symposium. Lichens in Focus. Tartu University Press, 2004
- Parmasto, E. Hymenochaetoid fungi (Basidiomycota) of North America. Mycotaxon, 79, 107–176, 2001
- M.A.Bondartseva, E.Parmasto, M.V. Gorlenko. Определитель грибов России. Порядок Афиллофоровые. Вып. 2 СПб: Наука, 1998 (in Russian)
- Parmasto, E. Corticioid fungi: a cladistic study of a paraphyletic group. Canadian Journal of Botany, 73, 1995, (Suppl. 1)
- E.Parmasto, I.Parmasto, T.Möls. Variation of Basidiospores in the Hymenomycetes and Its Significance to Their Taxonomy. Bibliotheca Mycologica, Lubrecht & Cramer Ltd, 1987
- Järva, L., Parmasto, E. Eesti seente koondnimestik. Tartu, 1980 (in Estonian)
- Parmasto, E. The Lachnocladiaceae of the Soviet Union. With a key to boreal species. Tartu, 1970

== See also ==
- Category:Taxa named by Erast Parmasto
