= Toomas Kukk =

Estonian botanist

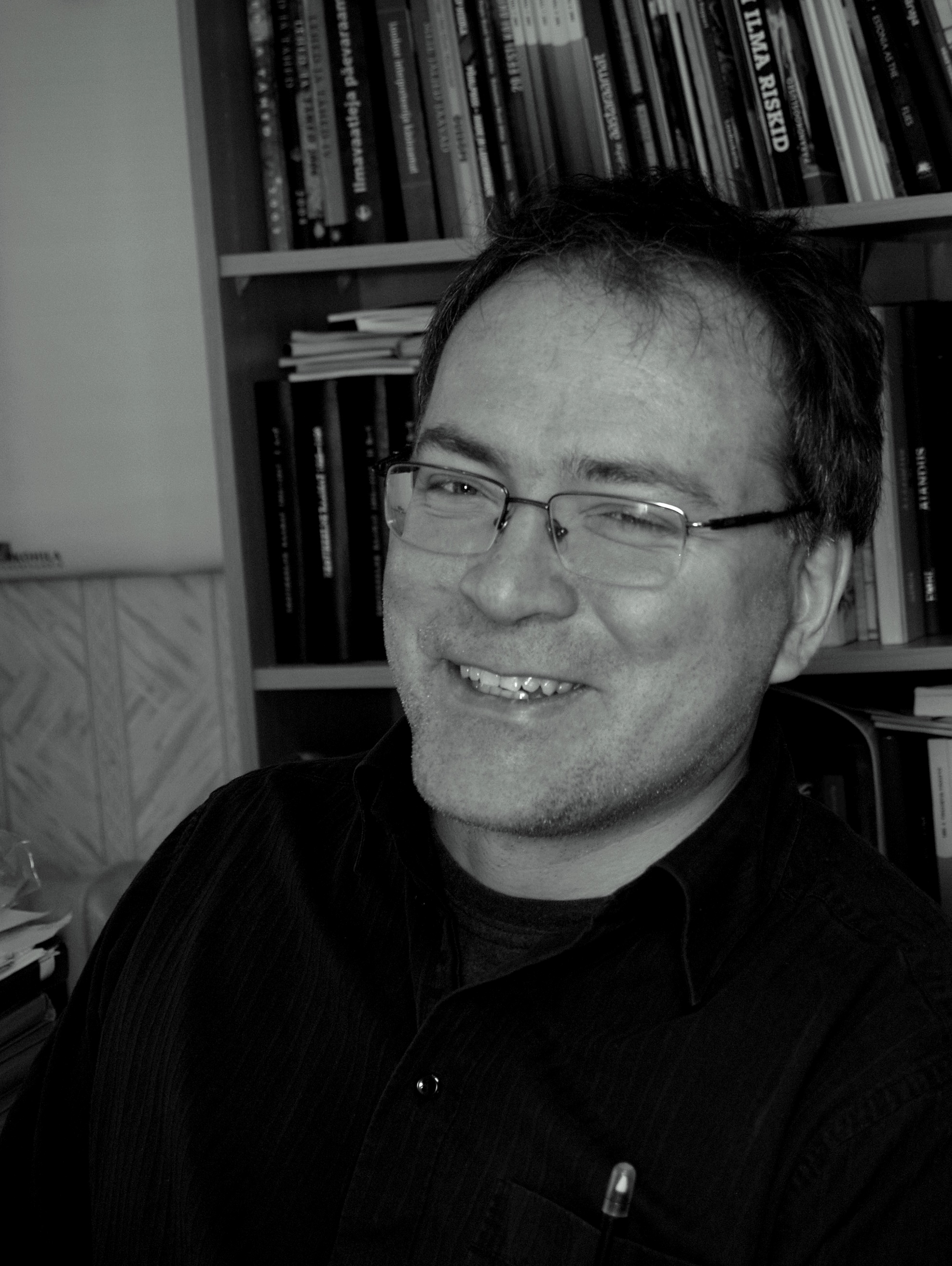
Toomas Kukk, 2010

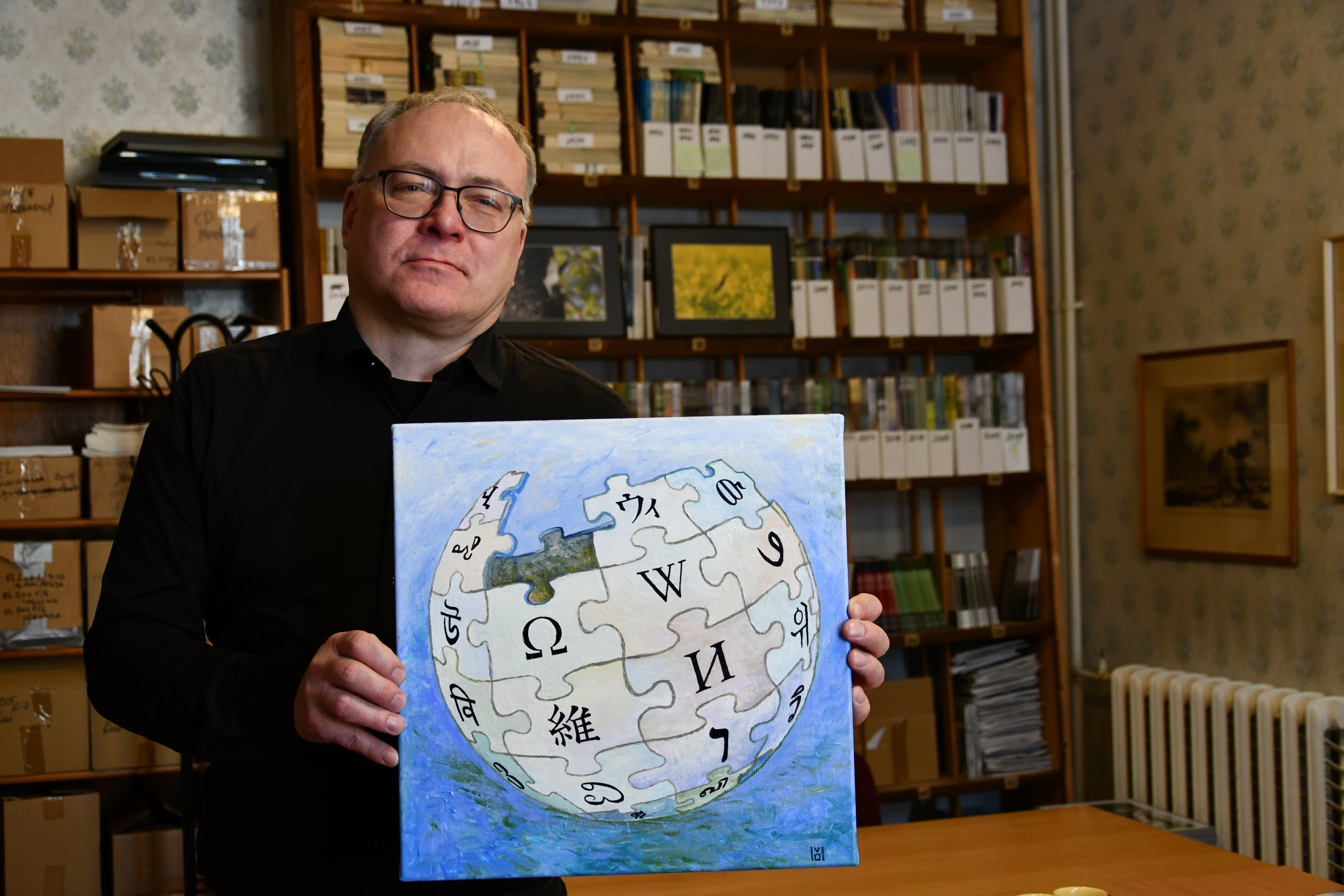
Friend of Wikipedia

Toomas Kukk (born 11 June 1971 in Tallinn) is an Estonian botanist.

He has been associated with the Estonian Institute of Zoology and Botany in Estonia since 1991. He has served as the editor-in-chief of Eesti Loodus since 2001. Toomas Kukk has written books about Estonian flora.

== Awards and recognitions ==
- 2014: Order of the White Star, Fourth Class
- 2020: Estonian Science Communication Award, grand prize
- 2022: Friend of Wikipedia
