= Mari Reitalu =

Estonian botanist

Mari Reitalu (born 10 February 1941) is an Estonian botanist. She was a recipient of the Eerik Kumari Award in 1993.
