= Liivia Laasimer =

Estonian botanist

Liivia-Maria Laasimer
- Born: 21 June 1918; Tartu, Estonia
- Died: 26 February 1988 (aged 69); Tartu, then part of Estonian SSR, Soviet Union
- Education: Tartu University
- Occupation: botanist

Liivia-Maria Laasimer (21 June 1918 – 26 February 1988) was an Estonian botanist, geobotanist, bryologist and plant systematist.

== Life and work ==
Laasimer was born in Tartu, Estonia, and in 1941 she graduated from Tartu University. From 1941 to 1947 she worked in Tartu University's Department of Plant Systematics and Geobotany at the Institute of Botany. From 1947 to 1988 she worked at the Estonian Institute of Zoology and Botany and was head of its botanical section from 1952 to 1986 and chief scientist from 1986 to 1988. There she researched geobotany and plant geography and ecology. She also prepared Estonian vegetation maps.

She was the first of many authors of the 11-volume Eesti NSV floora (1959–1984).

She was married to Jüri Laasimer and they had a son Ingmar Laasimer (born 7 February 1950)

Liivia-Maria Laasimer died at 69 years of age in Tartu on 26 February 1988.

== Honors and distinctions ==
- Medal of the Estonian Academy of Sciences (1967)
- Honored Scientist of the USSR (1969)
- Karl Ernst von Baeri medal (1980)
- USSR State Prize (1985)

== Memberships ==
- Foreign member of the Finnish biological society Vanamo
- Foreign member of Societas Phytogeographica Suecica (Sweden)
- 1978 Honorary member of the Estonian Society of Naturalists

== Selected publications ==
She was lead author of the 11-volume "Eesti NSV floora" (1959–1984).

- Laasimer, L. M. (1948). Eesti NSV tähtsamate maksasammalde määraja (Determinant of the most important forest mosses of the Estonian SSR). Teaduslik Kirjandus.
- Liivia Laasimer, A. Lillema, Silvia Talts and Richard Toomre, Types of natural grasslands of the Estonian SSR, Estonian Riiklik Kirjastus, 1957.
- Laasimer, L. M. (1979). Flora of the hepatics. Estonian contributions to the International Biological Programme; progress report.
