= Kalev Sepp =

American military personnel

Deputy Assistant Secretary of Defense for Special Operations & Combatting Terrorism
- In office July 2007 – Jan 2009
- President: George W. Bush

Personal details
- Education: The Citadel; CGSC; Harvard University

Dr. Kalev I. Sepp is senior lecturer in defense analyst at the U.S. Naval Postgraduate School in Monterey, California.

Until January 2009, he served as the Deputy Assistant Secretary of Defense for Special Operations Capabilities.

Dr. Sepp was responsible for the United States Department of Defense global counterterrorism portfolio. This included policy oversight of all special operations worldwide, and formulation of the department's global counterterrorism strategy. He received his appointment in July 2007.

A former U.S. Army Special Operations officer, he earned his PhD at Harvard University, and his Combat Infantryman Badge in the Salvadoran Civil War. His unit assignments included the 82d Airborne Division, the 2d Ranger Battalion, the 11th Armored Cavalry Regiment, and the 2d Infantry Division, among others. He was also an instructor at the U.S. Military Academy at West Point.

He served as an analyst and strategist in Iraq and Afghanistan, and as an expert member of the Baker-Hamilton Bipartisan Commission on Iraq, a.k.a. the Iraq Study Group. For his service in Iraq and the Pentagon, he has been awarded the Department of the Navy Superior Civilian Service Medal, the Secretary of Defense Medal for the Global War on Terrorism, and the Secretary of Defense Medal for Exceptional Civilian Service.

Dr. Sepp also graduated from the U.S. Army Command and General Staff College with a master's degree in Military Art and Science. Dr Sepp graduated from The Citadel in 1975 with a Bachelor of Arts in History.

== Publications ==
- Best Practices in Counterinsurgency, Military Review, May–June 2005, pp. 8–12.
- Weapon of Choice: U.S. Army Special Operations in Afghanistan, with R. Kiper, J. Schroder, C. Briscoe (Fort Leavenworth: CGSC Press, 2004)
- Case Study: The Maoist Insurgency in Nepal (RAND, 2003)
- The Renaissance Force, with Brig. Gen. R.W. Potter, Jr., chapter in Leadership: The Warrior's Art (Carlisle: Army War College Foundation Press, 2001)
- Review essay, Dana Priest’s The Mission: Waging War and Keeping Peace with America's Military, in USNI Proceedings (September 2003)
- Die atomare Vision. Der Einfluß von Nuklearwaffen auf die Führung der US Army 1952 bis 1958, chapter in Fuehrungsdenken in europaeischen und nordamerikanischen Steitkraeften im 19. und 20. Jahrhundert, trans. Gerhard Gross (Berlin: MGFA, 2001). Based on paper presented at 42d Annual International Military History Conference, Hamburg, Germany, 12 July 2000
