= Martin Zobel =

Estonian plant ecologist

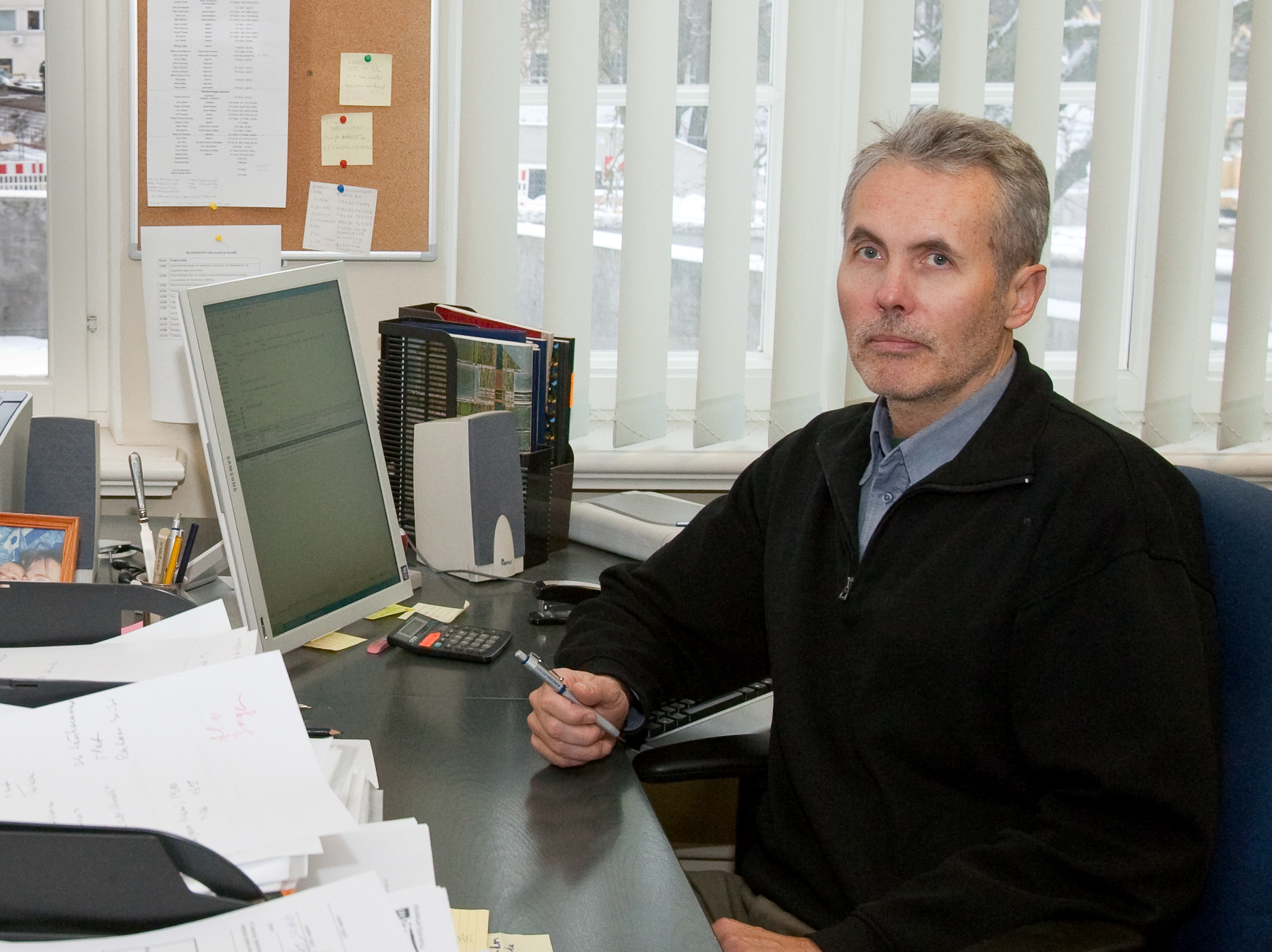
Martin Zobel (2009)

Martin Zobel (born 25 February 1957 in Tallinn) is an Estonian plant ecologist and professor at the University of Tartu. His name is particularly associated with the idea of an impact of regional species diversity on diversity at smaller spatial scales – known as the species pool effect. He has been professor since 1992. He has served as Editor-in-Chief of the scientific journal Ecography.

Zobel has appeared several times on Clarivate's annual lists of influential scientists every year from 2017 to 2021.

== Selected scientific works ==
- Zobel, M. (1984) Экология и динамика прибрежных альварных растительных сообществ Эстонской ССР (Ecology and dynamics of coastal alvar plant communities in Estonia). Biol.Kand. thesis, University of Tartu.
- Zobel, M. (1997) The relative role of species pools in determining plant species richness: an alternative explanation of species coexistence. Trends in Ecology & Evolution 12: 266–269.
- Zobel, M., Otsus, M., Liira, J., Moora, M. & Möls, T. (2000) Is small-scale species richness limited by seed availability or microsite availability? Ecology 81: 3274–3282.

== Personal life ==
His father was architecture historian Rein Zobel and his brother is biologist Kristjan Zobel. He is married to community ecology professor Mari Moora.
