= Eero Loone =

Estonian philosopher

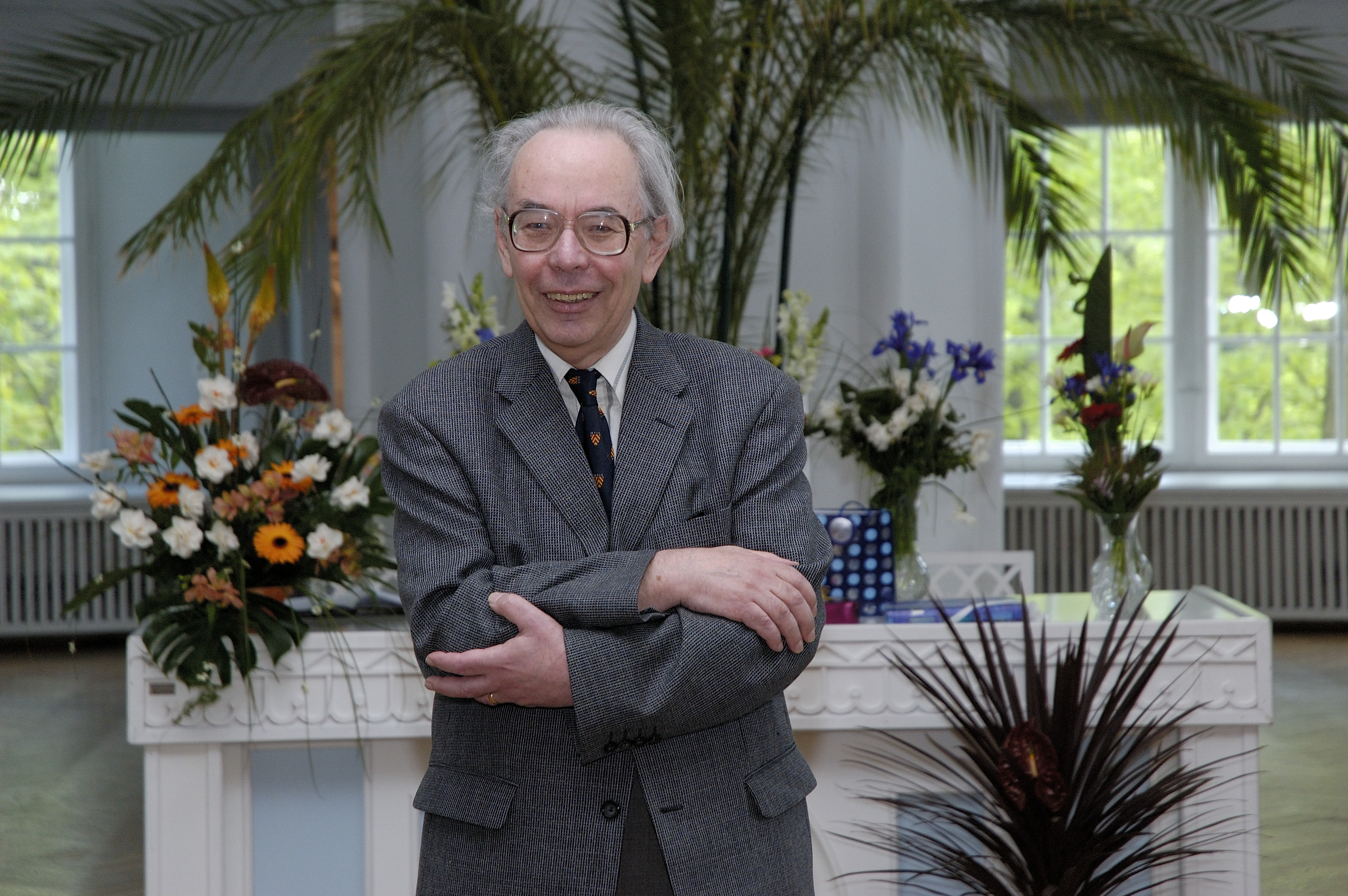
Eero Loone in 2005

Eero Loone (born 26 May 1935 in Tartu) is an Estonian philosopher.

He is the son of Nigolas Loone and Leida Loone.

Eero Loone graduated from the Moscow State University in 1958 (he studied history). From 1958 to 1960, Loone worked as junior researcher at the USSR institute of Global Economy and International Relations. Since 1966, he has been lecturer of philosophy (specializing in practical philosophy) at the University of Tartu (became a professor in 1988). He became Doctor of Philosophy in 1984. From 1989 to 1990 Eero Loone worked at Clare Hall, Cambridge (he became lifelong member of the college). He has been particularly influenced by analytical philosophy. Loone's views on Marxism and historical materialism have found resonance in the West. According to Varoufakis, Loone's verdict (as evident in Soviet Marxism and Analytical Philosophies of History) on Soviet Communism is arguably "devastating and coincides with that of many Western scholars Marxist (e.g. Alex Callinicos) and non-Marxist (e.g. Alec Nove) alike″ Since 2000, Loone has been professor emeritus at the University of Tartu.

Eero Loone is married to Leiki Loone and has two daughters: Piret Loone and Oudekki Loone (a political scientist and member of Estonian Parliament Riigikogu since 2015).

== Works ==
- Eero Loone Soviet Marxism and Analytical Philosophies of History. London and Moscow, 1992.
- Eero Loone, "Marxism and Perestroika," Soviet Studies 42, no. 4 (October 1990): 791
