= Haide-Ene Rebassoo =

Estonian botanist

Haide-Ene Rebassoo (25 January 1935, Tallinn – 27 December 2018) was an Estonian botanist who specialized in the flora of Hiiumaa island.

== Life and work ==
She graduated from Tartu State University in 1958 as a botanist with a thesis about the flora of Hiiumaa (the second largest island of Estonia) and its genesis.

In Leningrad (now St. Petersburg, Russia), Rebassoo defended her doctoral thesis in 1988, which was based on the paper "Biocenoses of the islands of the eastern part of the Baltic Sea, their composition, classification and protection" published in 1987 in Estonian and Russian.

She was affiliated with the Estonian Institute of Zoology and Botany in Tartu from 1960 to 1979 and from 1983 to 1993. In 1975 she notably published her scientific findings on sea shore plants of the small Islands of Estonia.

== Notable publications ==
- 1967: "Hiiumaa floora ja selle genees"
- 1972: "Laidude raamat"
- 1973: "Hiiumaa"
- 1974: "Eesti taimeriigis"
- 1975: "Botaanilisi kilde 17 Hiiumaa suvest"
- 1975: "Sea-shore plant communities of the Estonian islands"
- 1979: "Eesti taimharuldusi"
- 1981: "Kaitskem kauneid taimi
