= Eesti Loodus =

Estonian magazine

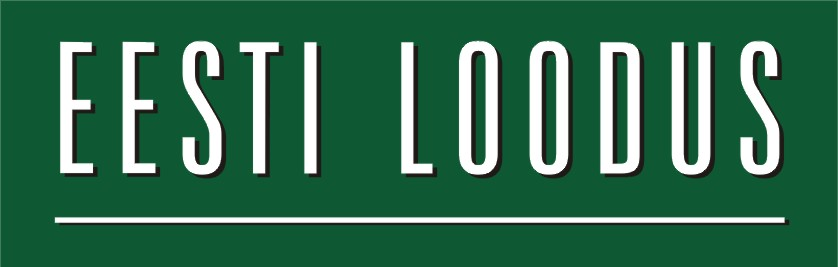
- Circulation: monthly
- Publisher: Loodusajakiri MTÜ
- Founded: 1933
- Website: Official website

Eesti Loodus ('Nature of Estonia') is magazine published in Estonia. It focuses on topics related to nature of Estonia.

Magazine is published by Loodusajakiri MTÜ and it is funded also by Environmental Investment Centre.

First number published in 1933. Between 1942 and 1957 publishing of magazine was stopped. Linda Poots served as editor from 1957 to 1984.

Since 2001 the editor-in-chief of Eesti Loodus is Toomas Kukk.
