= Mare Teichmann =

Estonian psychologist

Mare Teichmann (born 1 March 1954) is an Estonian psychologist and academic.

== Biography ==
Mare Teichmann was born 1 March 1954, in Tallinn. She holds a PhD in Psychology from the Bekhterev Institute Leningrad, now Saint Petersburg. Mare Teichmann (PhD) is Professor of Psychology, and founder of Chair of Psychology (1992); founder and director of Institute of Industrial Psychology (2009) at Tallinn University of Technology (now Professor Emeritus). She is a member of many boards and councils, especially in the academic self-administration of her specialty in Work and Organizational Psychology; her current positions include but are not limited to: membership in the WHO Quality of Life Board, chairwoman of the WHO Estonian Quality of Life Centre, member of the European Association of Work and Organizational Psychology, and member of the Collaborative International Study of Managerial Stress (CISMS). Her main fields of research are occupational stress, psychosocial factors at work, quality of life incl. quality of working life, work locus of control. Parallel to academic work she has been applying science-based knowledge and psychological methods to practice as CEO of PE Konsult Ltd .

== Selected works ==
- Teichmann, M. (2020). Mapping and Assessing Psychosocial Risk Factors for Individual- and Organizational-level Occupational Stress Intervention. EAWOP IN PRACTICE, 2020/12, 25–38.http://www.eawop.org/ckeditor_assets/attachments/1337/99_inpractice_12_journal_v2.pdf
- Teichmann, M. (2014). Academics' occupational stressors. Medical News Today's (http://www.medicalnewstoday.com/releases/270831.php) and Medical News Today weekly newsletter.
- Martínez-Córcoles, M.; Teichmann, M.; Murdvee, M. (2017). Assessing technophobia and technophilia: Development and validation of a questionnaire. Technology in Society, 51, 183–188. https://www.sciencedirect.com/journal/technology-in-society/vol/51/suppl/C
- Teichmann, M. (2011). "The challenges facing academic staff professional development in technical university." In: Papers of Baltech Conference 2011: Lincköping, Sweden: Tallinn Technical University, 2011, 1 - 19.
- Teichmann, Mare, Murdvee, M., Saks, Kai. (2006). "Spiritual Needs and Quality of Life in Estonia." Social Indicators Research, Vol. 76, No. 1, 147–163.
- Spector, Paul E., Allen, Tammy D., Poelmans, Steven, Cooper, Cary L., Bernin, Peggy, Hart, Peter, Lu, Luo, Miller, Karen, Renault de Moraes, Lucio, Ostrognay, Gabrielle M., Pitariu, Horea, Salamatov, Vladimir, Salgado, Jesus, Sanchez, Juan I., Siu, Oi Ling, Teichmann, Mare, Theorell, Töres, Vlerick, Peter, Widerszal-Bazyl, Maria, Yu, Shanfa. (2005). "An international comparative study of work-family stress and occupational strain." In: Work and family: An international research perspective. (Ed. Poelmans, Steven A. Y.); Mahwah, NJ, US: Lawrence Erlbaum Associates, Publishers. pp. 71–84. [Original Chapter]
