= List of plant pathologists =

== A ==
- Ruth F. Allen

== B ==
- Kenneth F. Baker
- Heinrich Anton de Bary
- Helen Purdy Beale
- Miles Joseph Berkeley
- Norman E. Borlaug
- Henry Luke Bolley
- Myron Brakke
- Julius Oscar Brefeld
- Edwin John Butler

== C ==
- Vera Charles
- Jesse Roy Christie
- John Colhoun (plant pathologist)

== D ==
- James G. Dickson

== E ==
- Jakob Eriksson

== F ==
- Harold Henry Flor

== G ==
- Ernst Albert Gäumann

== H ==
- Robert Hartig
- James G. Horsfall

== K ==
- Julius Kühn

== L ==
- Frank Lamson-Scribner
- Ernest Charles Large

== M ==
- Pierre-Marie-Alexis Millardet
- B.B. Mundkur

== N ==
- Margaret Newton

== P ==
- Flora Wambaugh Patterson
- Isaac-Bénédict Prévost

== S ==
- Effie A. Southworth
- Elvin C. Stakman

== V ==
- Mikhail Stepanovich Voronin

== W ==
- Harry Marshall Ward
- Marvin Weintraub
- Herbert Hice Whetzel

== Z ==
- Milton Zaitlin

== See also ==
- List of botanists
- List of plant scientists (merge to List of botanists)
