= Mart Murdvee =

Estonian psychologist and scholar (born 1951)

Mart Murdvee (March 18, 1951 – January 29, 2022) was an Estonian psychologist and scholar.

He was trained at Tartu University and has worked with Mare Teichmann and others.

He is the father of conductor and violinist Mikk Murdvee.
