= Hendrik Relve =

Estonian environmentalist, nature writer and nature photographer

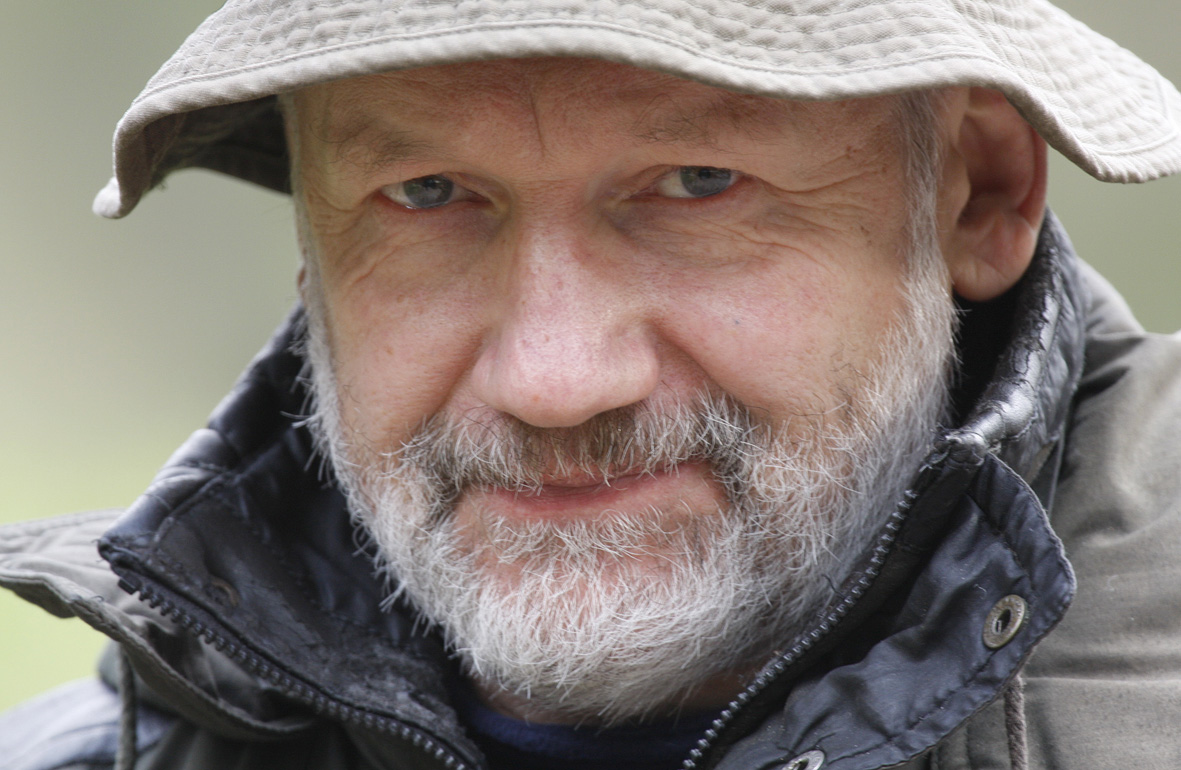
Hendrik Relve

Hendrik Relve (born 18 July 1948 in Tallinn) is an Estonian environmentalist, nature writer and nature photographer.

In 1971 he graduated from Estonian Agricultural Academy in forest engineering, and in 1989 University of Tartu in journalism.

Since 2002 he is the chief editor of magazine Eesti Mets. He is the host of the Vikerraadio's radio program "Kuula rändajat".

Awards:

- 2001: Order of the White Star, IV class.

== Filmography ==
Filmography:

- 2006: "Mets seob põlvkondi" (documental film; scenarist)
- 2013: "Metsa poole" (documental film; author)
- 2014: "Maastiku mustrid" (documental film; script author)
- 2017: "Vaata rändajat" (documental film;, animated film; scenarist, operator, text reader)
