= Urmas Tartes =

Estonian biologist and photographer

- Tartes in 2022
- Born: Tartu, Estonia
- Occupations: Biologist; Photographer

Urmas Tartes is an Estonian biologist and nature photographer.

== Life and work ==
Tartes ended his studies in Nõo Secondary school in 1982 with a gold medal and graduated from University of Tartu in 1989 with cum laude as biologist-zoologist. He became Doctor of Philosophy in 1995 with a thesis "Respiration Rhythms in Insects".

Since 1989 he worked in Estonian Institute of Zoology and Botany. Between 1996 and 2004 he served as the director of the institute. Between 2005 and 2010 he was a professor in Estonian University of Life Sciences. From then on, he continued as a freelance nature photographer and writer.

== Awards ==
He was the recipient of the Fourth Class of Order of the White Star in 2001.

In 2009 he won Veolia Environnement Wildlife Photographer of the Year in the category "Animals in their Environment" with a photo of a springtail on a snowflake.

In 2023 he received Eerik Kumari Award.

== Books co-authored by Tartes ==
- Bioloogia gümnaasiumile (part III), Eesti Loodusfoto. 2001. ISBN 9985830466.
- Legendiloomad, Varrak. 2008. ISBN 9789985317822.
- Loodusfoto lugu ja lumm, Varrak. 2009. ISBN 9789985319901.
- Putukad õhus, maas ja vees, Valgus. 2012. ISBN 9789985682692.
- Eesti päevaliblikad, Varrak. 2014. ISBN 9789985329993.

== Gallery ==
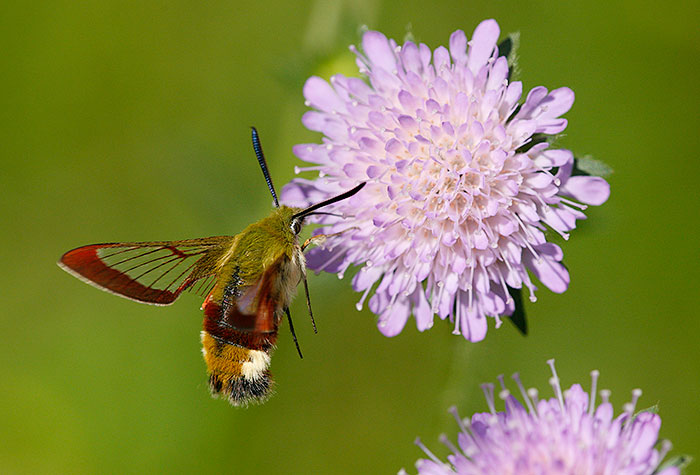
Hemaris fuciformis

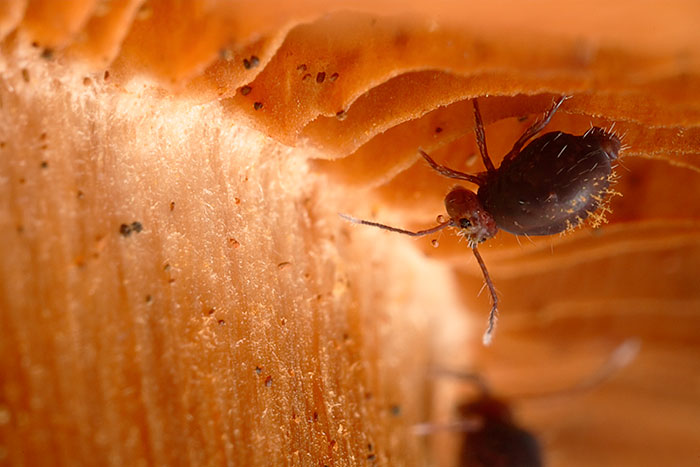
Allacma fusca

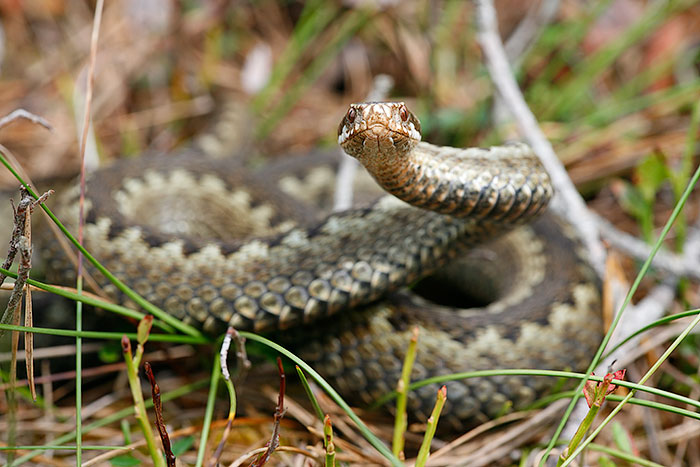
Vipera berus

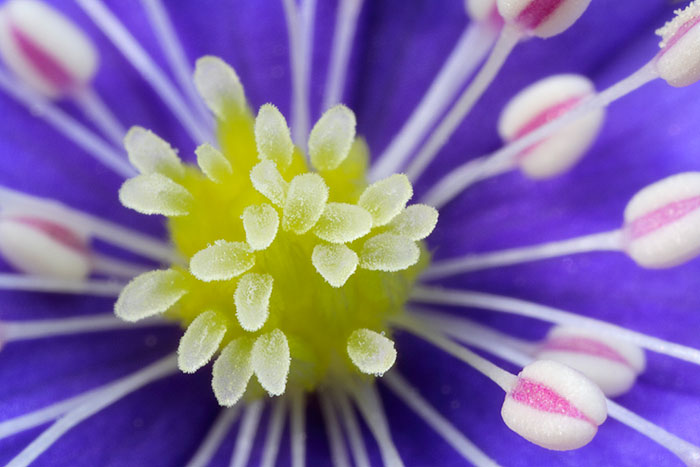
Anemone hepatica
