= David Roblin (physician) =

Welsh physician and scientist (born 1966)

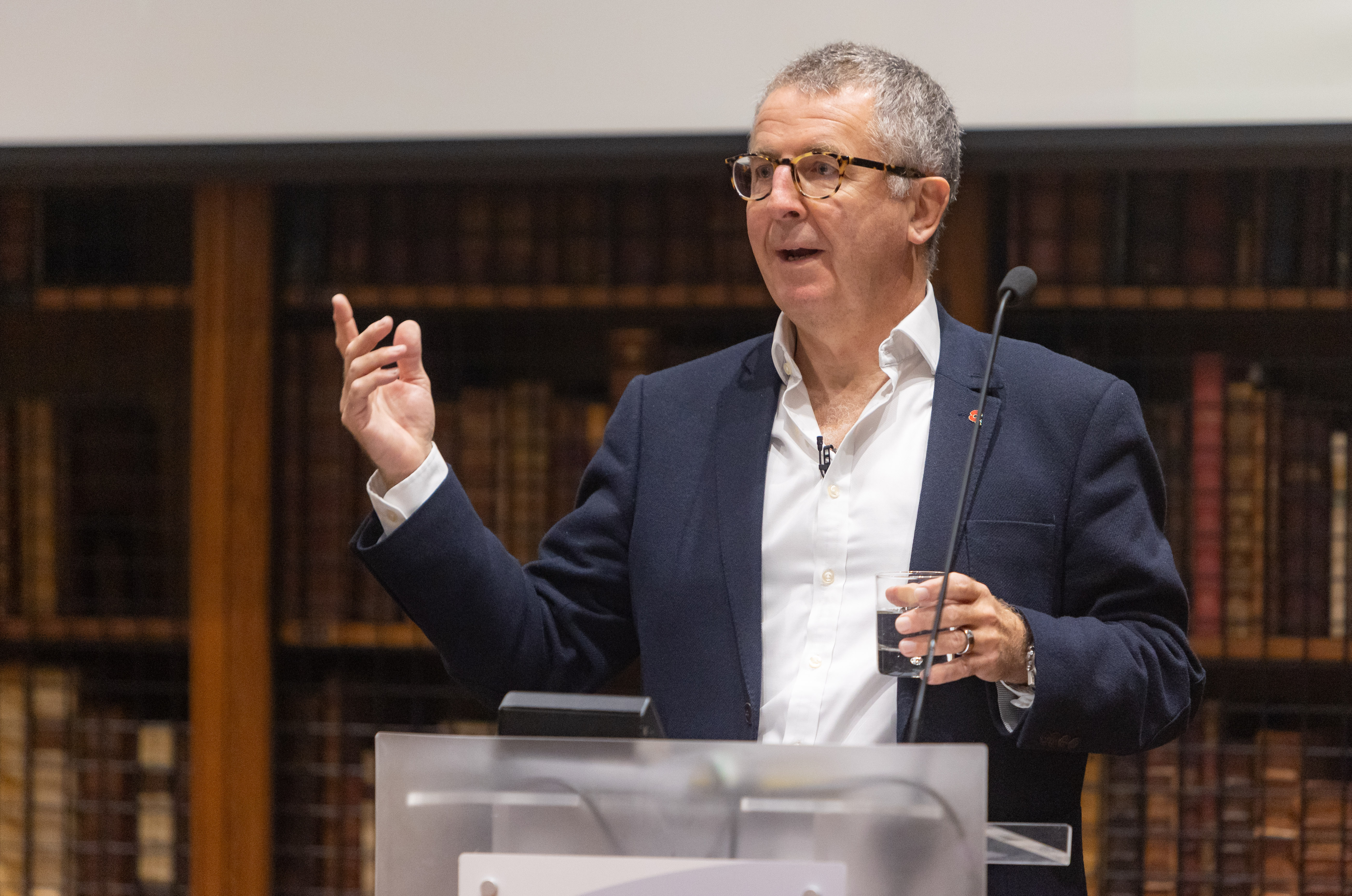
- Known for: Pharma and biotech leadership
- Awards: Academy of Medical Sciences member

David Roblin FRCP, FFPM, FMedSci (born 25 September 1966). is a British physician and scientist specialising in drug discovery, pharmaceutical research, and translational medicine. He has held leadership roles in biotechnology and academia, contributing to the development of new therapeutics.

== Early life and education ==
Roblin was born on 25 September 1966 in Neath, Wales. His parents were both secondary school teachers in Neath. He attended Cwmtawe Comprehensive School in Pontardawe.

He was educated at St George's Hospital Medical School, University of London, where he obtained a BSc in Biochemistry (First-Class Honours) in 1987 and an MB BS (Honours) in Medicine in 1991.

== Career ==
Roblin began his medical career at St George's Hospital and St Bartholomew's Hospital in London. His involvement in clinical trials and translational research led to his transition into pharmaceutical research in 1995, when he took up a clinical position at Pfizer. In 1997 he moved to Bayer as Head of Therapy Area for Anti-infectives, then moved back to Pfizer in 1999 as Senior Clinician.

During his time at Pfizer Global, Roblin held several senior leadership positions, including SVP, Head of Research, Site Director and Chief Medical Officer, European R&D. Over his 20 years in senior positions at Bayer at Pfizer he led teams up to 6,000 people. His experience crosses therapy areas from research and development to commercial phases. At Pfizer and Bayer he was instrumental in the successful development of 12 important medicines including Zithromax (azithromycin), Selzentry (maraviroc), ciprofloxacin and moxifloxacin.

Roblin has chaired the research director’s group of the European Federation of Pharmaceutical Industries and Associations (EFPIA), and was a co-founder of the Innovative Medicines Initiative, a public-private partnership with the European Commission. He left Pfizer in early 2011, and has been Chief Medical Officer and a Non-Executive Director to a number of Biotechs.

== Biotechnology and research leader ==
=== Francis Crick Institute ===
In 2014, Roblin became Chief Operating Officer and Director of Translation at the Francis Crick Institute. During his time leading scientific translation he contributed to the creation of 11 spinout companies, collectively raising over £350 million in investment and employing more than 300 people.

In 2015, Roblin led the Crick’s first open science collaboration with GlaxoSmithKline (GSK), embedding industrial scientists within research teams to accelerate drug discovery. He described this as: "A landmark agreement in open science... Together, we shall accelerate breakthroughs in understanding human health and disease".

=== Summit Therapeutics and Juvenescence ===
in June 2017, he stood down as Chief Operating Officer and Director of Scientific Translation at the Crick to become Chief Operating Officer and President of Research & Development for Summit Therapeutics. He retained a role at the Crick, becoming a Senior Scientific Translation Fellow, advising the Crick Executive Committee and Board on commercial translation, and chair of the Crick's Translation Advisory Board.

In 2020, Roblin joined Juvenescence as Chief Operating Officer of the parent Corporation and CEO of the pharmaceutical division.

=== Relation Therapeutics ===
In 2022, Roblin became Chief Executive Officer of Relation Therapeutics, a pioneer of drug discovery using active-graph machine learning. He had been involved in Relation since its founding.

== Academic and advisory roles ==
Roblin holds honorary professorships at St George's Hospital Medical School (2015–present) and Swansea University Medical School (2013–present). He has also served on committees and boards for the Academy of Medical Sciences, the Wellcome Trust, the Medical Research Council, the National Institute for Health Research and King's Health Partners Ventures.

== Awards and honours ==
Roblin has been elected a Fellow of the Academy of Medical Sciences (FMedSci) (2017), a Fellow of the Royal College of Physicians (FRCP) (2004), and a Fellow of the Faculty of Pharmaceutical Medicine (FFPM) (2014), and a Global Fellow of Medicines Development of the International Federation of Associations of Pharmaceutical Physicians (2020). He is recognised as a Biotech leader

== Personal life ==
Roblin is married to Dr Sallyanne Roblin, and they have two sons and a daughter.
