= Leiki Loone =

Estonian mathematician

Leiki Loone (née Sikk; born 29 February 1944), is an Estonian mathematician specialising in applications of functional analysis in theory of summability and in the structure theory of topological vector spaces.

She is married to Estonian philosopher Eero Loone. The couple has two daughters.

== Sources ==
- Universitas Tartuensis 27 February 2004: Dotsent Leiki Loone 60
