= Kaljo Pork =

Estonian botanist

Kaljo Pork (30 March 1930 - 2 December 1981) was an Estonian botanist. He was affiliated with the Estonian Institute of Zoology and Botany between 1952 and his death in 1981.

Pork was born in the village of Ramma in Järva County. He initiated the creation of Laelatu Biological Station at one of the most species-rich plant community in Europe — a wooded meadow at the western coast of Estonia.

He died in Tartu.
