= Miia Rannikmäe =

Estonian chemist

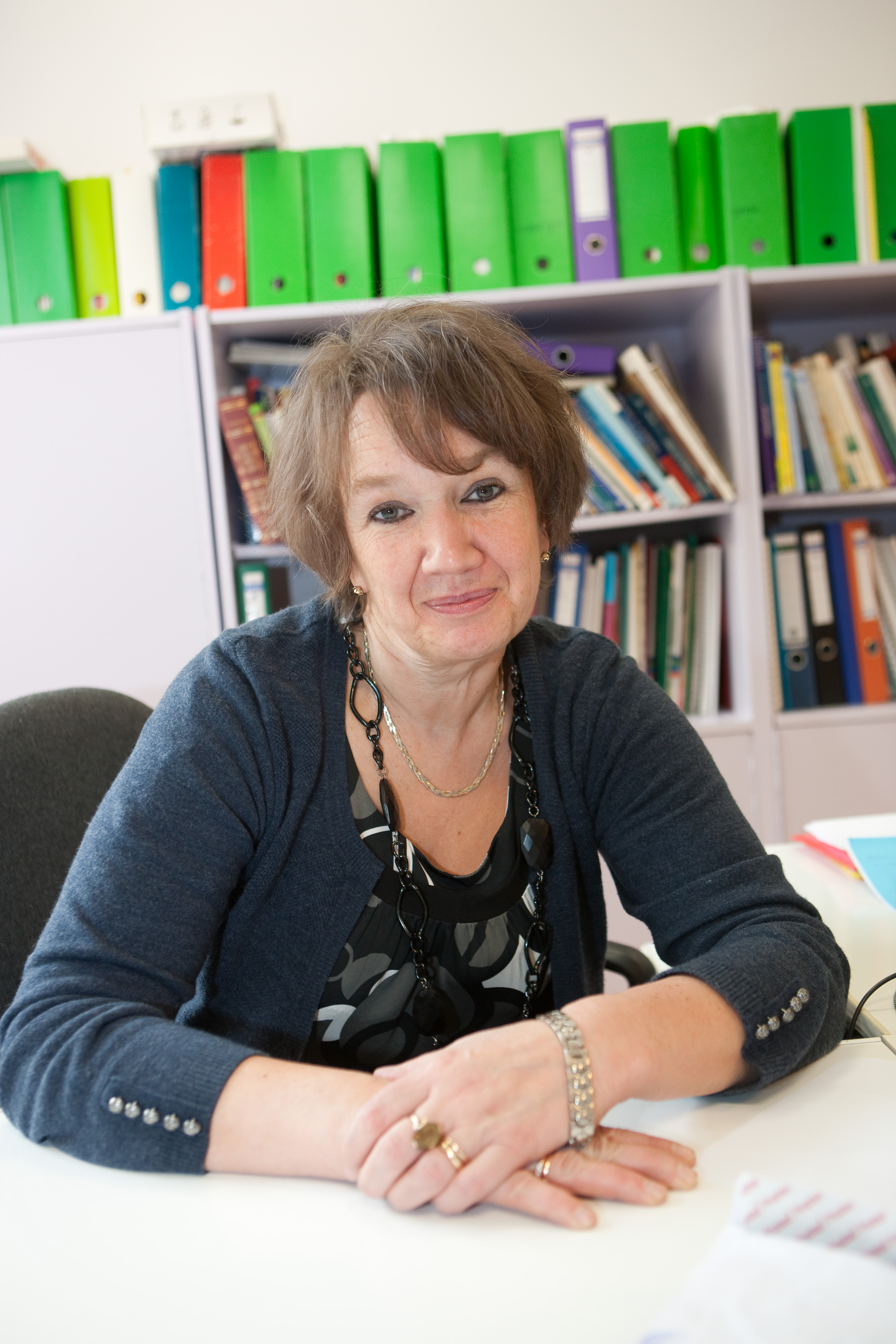
Miia Rannikmäe

Miia Rannikmäe (née Tammeorg, born 4 October 1951) is an Estonian chemist specializing in cognitive learning and scientific literacy.

== Biography ==
Born in Tartu, Rannikmäe graduated in chemistry and as a chemistry teacher from the University of Tartu in 1975. She went on to gain a master's degree in education there in 1996 with a thesis on Phenomenographic analyses of students concept of chemical reaction. In 2001, she earned a PhD in Life and Earth Sciences Education from the same university. As of November 2015, she is Professor of Science Education, heading the Science Education Centre at the University of Tartu.

Her research has covered work on literacy in chemistry among elementary school pupils and the scientific and technological literacy of schoolchildren. She has worked as a school teacher and has links with science teacher associations at home and abroad. In 2004, she contributed to the European Commission's high level group and the publication Europe needs more Scientists. She guides her PhD students in scientific literacy, inquiry learning and the nature of science.
