= Viktor Masing =

Estonian botanist and ecologist

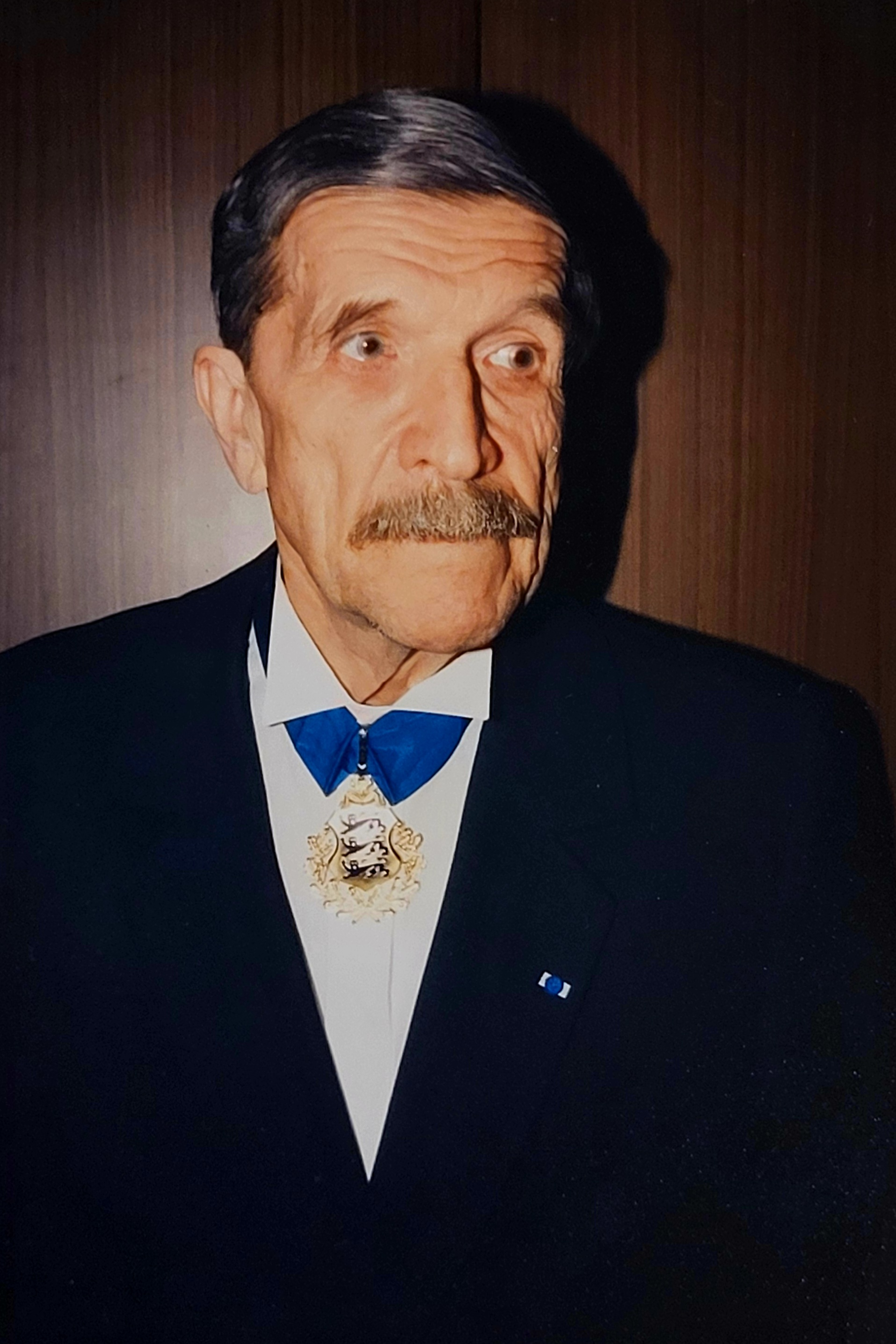
Viktor Masing (1993)

Viktor Masing (11 April 1925, Tartu – 18 March 2001) was an Estonian botanist and ecologist. He was born in Tartu. He became a member of the Estonian Academy of Sciences in 1993.

He was a specialist in telmatology, and an organizer of wetland protection.

His wife, Linda Poots, was a fellow scientist and nature writer.
