= Tiiu Kull =

Estonian botanist

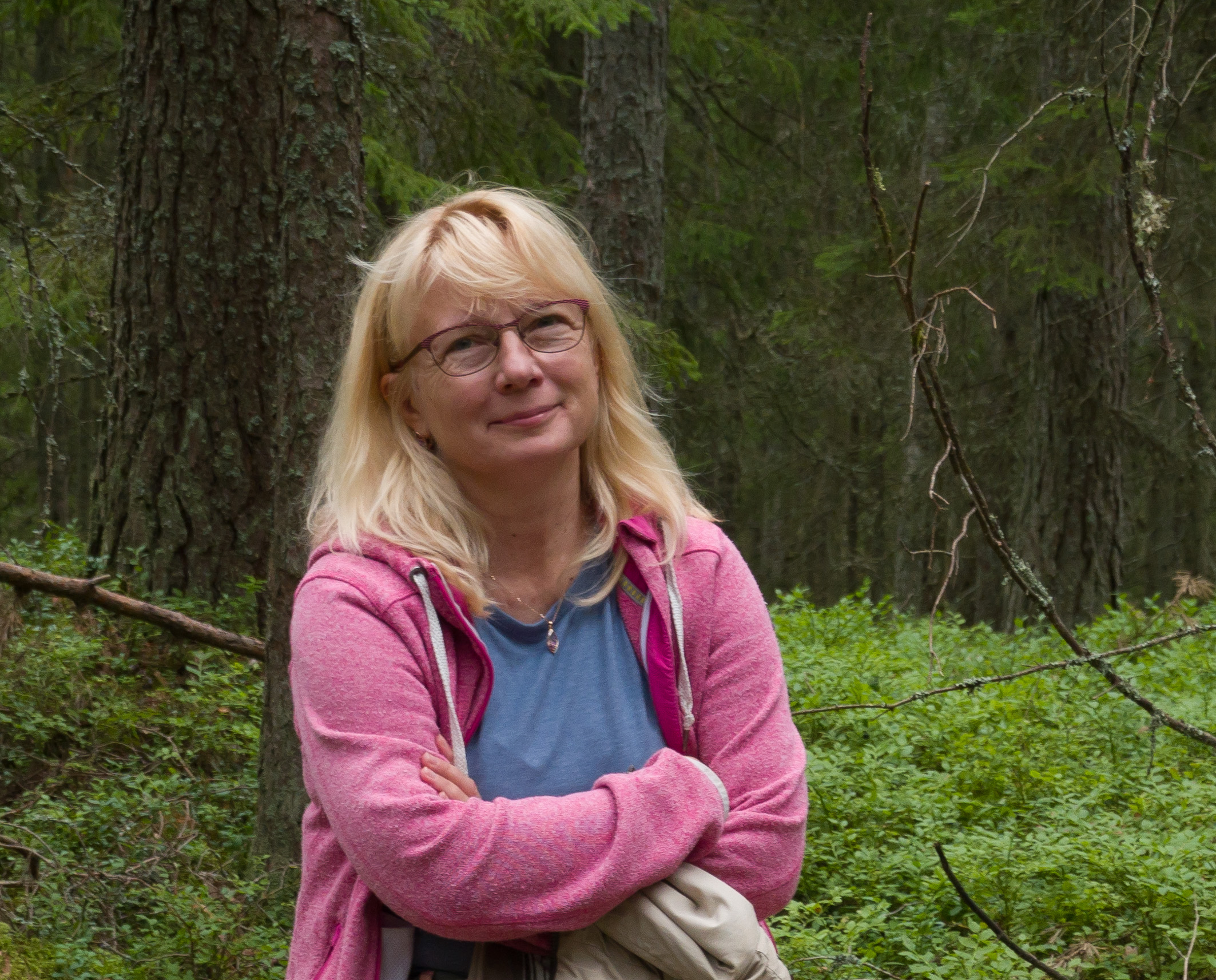
Tiiu Kull

Tiiu Kull (born 26 August 1958) is an Estonian botanist. She specialises in the study of population dynamics in plant species and has published an extensive number of papers on the subject. In 1997 she conducted a study, "Population studies of native orchids in Estonia".

More recently Kull's research has seen her examine the irregularity of temporal patterns in perennial herbs as a phenomenon of intermodular interactions.
