= Ülle Kukk =

Estonian botanist and conservationist

- Born: 18 November 1937 (age 88); Tartu, Estonia
- Known for: studies of Estonian flora.
- Scientific career
- Fields: botany and conservation.
- Institutions: Tallinn Botanic Garden

Ülle Kukk (born 18 November 1937 in Tartu) is an Estonian botanist and conservationist.

== Education and career ==
She was born in Tartu and graduated from the University of Tartu in 1960. 1960–1962 she continued to work in the university and also in the Institute of Experimental Biology of the Academy of Sciences of the Estonian SSR.

From 1965 to 1975 she worked as a member of the research staff at the Tallinn Botanic Garden. From 1976 to 1996 she worked for the Estonian Institute of Forestry, and since 1996, she has worked for in the Institute of the Environmental Protection of the Estonian University of Life Sciences.

== Research ==
Kukk's research has addressed Estonian protected plants and indigenous ornamental plants, and she has been engaged in the distribution of rare and protected plants, biology, monitoring and protection.

She is one of the founders and a board member of the Estonian Orchid Protection Club (Eesti Orhideekaitse Klubi).

Kukk is a member of the Berne Convention's Expert Group on flora, and she was a co-author of the "Estonian Red Book" established in 1998.

== Personal ==
She was married to phycologist and conservationist Erich Kukk (1928–2017).

== Selected publications ==
- Kukk, Ülle (1972). Looduslikke dekoratiivtaimi [Wild ornamental plants] (in Estonian). Tallinn: Valgus. (English version published by Light: New York)
- Pilt, Indrek; Kukk, Ülle (December 2002) [2002]. "Pulsatilla patens and Pulsatilla pratensis (Ranunculaceae) in Estonia: distribution and ecology" (Google Books). Proceedings of the Estonian Academy of Sciences, Biology and Ecology. 51: 242–256.
- Kukk, Ülle (2003). "The distribution of Ligularia sibirica (L.) Cass. in Estonia and changes in its population" (PDF). Biuletyn Ogrodów Botanicznych. 12: 11–22.
