= Ann Marvet =

Estonian botanist

Ann Marvet is an Estonian botanist. She is an editor of the journal Estonian Nature and a member of the Estonian Commission for Nature Conservation.

In 2008 she was made a member of the Order of the White Star, third class.
