= Aapo =

Male given name

Aapo is a Finnish and Estonian given name derived from Abraham. Notable people with the name include:

- Aapo Häkkinen (born 1976), Finnish musician
- Aapo Halme (born 1998), Finnish football center-back
- Aapo Harjula (1880–1961), Finnish cooperative inspector and politician
- Aapo Heikkilä (born 1994), Finnish footballer
- Aapo Ilves (born 1970), Estonian poet, writer, artist and musician
- Aapo Inkinen (1898–1960), Finnish politician
- Aapo Kyrölä (born 1979), Finnish businessman
- Aapo Mäenpää (born 1998), Finnish footballer
- Aapo Perko (1924–2021), Finnish shot putter
- Aapo Pukk (born 1962), Estonian painter
