= Maarja Vaino =

Estonian literary scholar (born 1976)

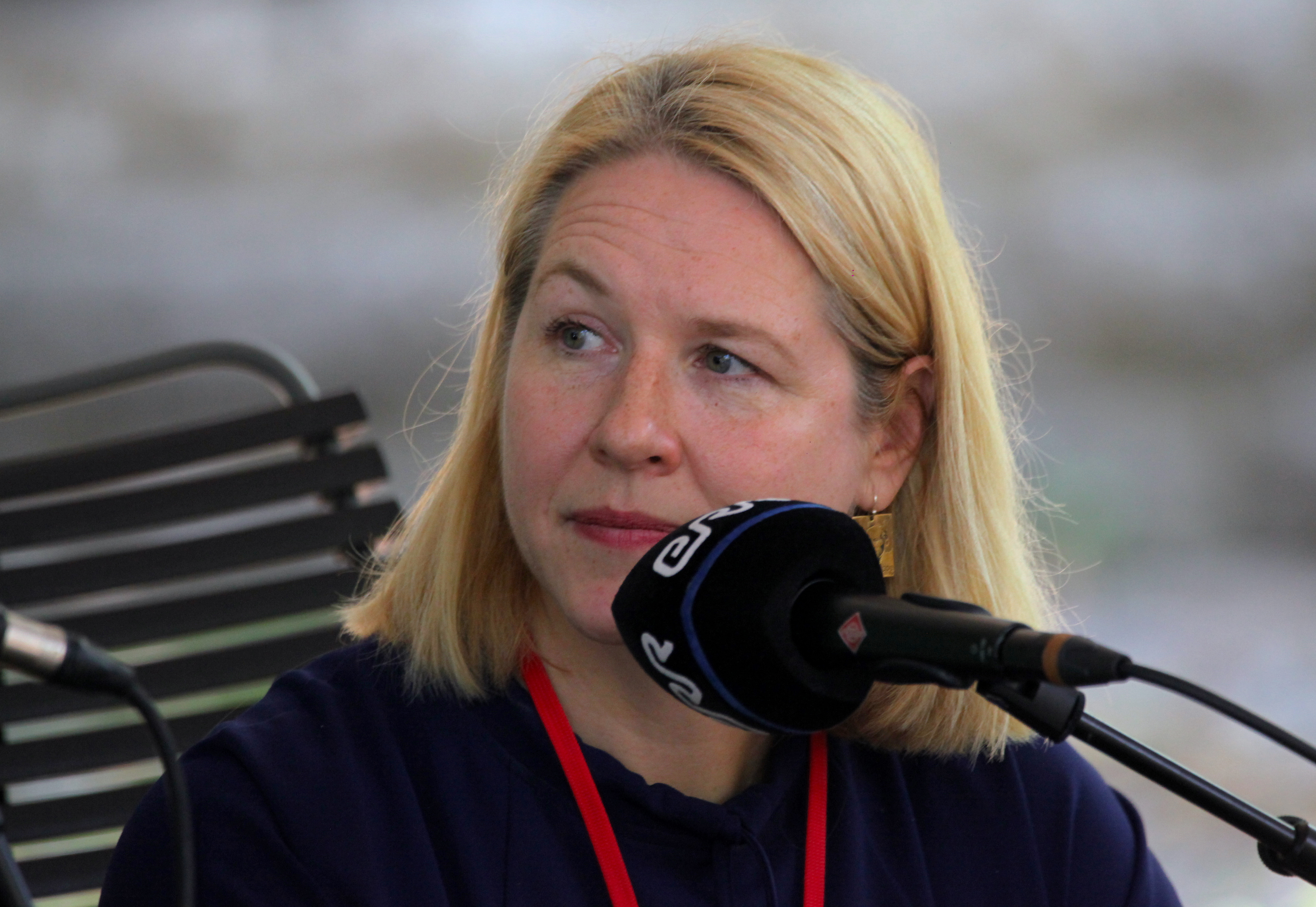
- Vaino in 2021
- Born: Maarja Helme; April 24, 1976 (age 50); Tallinn, then part of Estonian SSR, Soviet Union
- Occupation: Literary scholar
- Partner: Toomas Haug
- Parents: Mart Helme (father); Sirje Helme (mother)
- Relatives: Martin Helme (brother); Peeter Helme (cousin); Kalju Reitel (grandfather)

Maarja Vaino (née Helme; born April 24, 1976) is an Estonian literary scholar. Since 2017, she has been the director of the Tallinn Literature Center.

== Early life and education ==
Maarja Vaino was born in Tallinn, Estonia, the daughter of the art historian Sirje Helme and the politician Mart Helme.

Vaino graduated from Tallinn Pedagogical University with a bachelor's degree in Estonian philology, and she defended her dissertation cum laude in Estonian literary and cultural studies at Tallinn University in 2011; her dissertation title was Irratsionaalsuse poeetika A. H. Tammsaare loomingus (The Poetics of Irrationalism in the Work of A. H. Tammsaare, supervised by Rein Veidemann). The dissertation received the main prize across disciplines and levels in the National Student Research Paper Competition, and it was selected as the best dissertation of 2012 in the humanities dissertation category in the Tallinn University Student Research Paper Competition. An expanded version of the dissertation intended for a broader audience was published as the book Tammsaare irratsionaalsuse poeetika (Tammsaare's Poetics of Irrationalism).

== Career ==
Vaino was the director of the A. H. Tammsaare Museum from 2005 to 2016. Since 2017, she has been the director of the Tallinn Literature Center. Since 2015, Vaino has contributed as a columnist for the newspaper Postimees and as one of the authors of the daily commentaries on Vikerraadio.

From 2016 to 2020, she hosted the cultural program Vasar (Hammer) on Vikerraadio (until the end of 2018 with Peeter Helme), and from the fall of 2020 to March 2024 she was one of the hosts of the program Loetud ja kiristeet. From 2022 to 2024, she was one of the hosts of the ETV2 program Kultuuristuudio. Arutelu (Culture Studio: Discussion). In 2019, she published a study of Mati Unt's work: Mati Undi hämaruse poeetika (Mati Unt's Poetics of Twilight).

In 2019, Vaino was elected a Tallinn University Alumnus of the Century. She is a member of the Estonian Writers' Union, the chairwoman of the board of the Estonian Writers' Museums Association, a member of the literary group 14NÜ, a member of the ICOM International Committee for Literary Museums (ICLM), and a member of the research committee of the Museum Council at the Estonian Ministry of Culture.

== Works ==
- 2003: Meie lapse jõulusalmid (Our Child's Christmas Verses; compilation). Tallinn: Kunst
- 2004: Meie lapse talvejutud (Our Child's Winter Tales; compilation). Tallinn: Kunst
- 2004: "Tammsaare Tõde ja õigus Foucault' võimukäsitluse raamistikus" (Tammsaare's Truth and Justice and Foucault's Power Conception). Keel ja Kirjandus 9
- 2007: A. H. Tammsaare inimesest, elust, armastusest (A. H. Tammsaare on Man, Life, Love; compilation). Tallinn: Kunst
- 2007: Johannes Üksi, tegelane kirjanduse mitteteadvusest (Johannes Üksi, a Character from the Unconsciousness of Literature). Kirikiri
- 2007: Teistmoodi Tammsaare (A Different Tammsaare; comic book, compilation). Tallinn: A. H. Tammsaare Muuseum
- 2008: Gailit. Inimesest, elust, armastusest (Gailit. On People, Life, Love; compilation). Tallinn: Kunst
- 2010: A. H. Tammsaare Õnnelikest ja õnnetuist aegadest. Valik publitsistikat (A. H. Tammsaare's Of Happy and Unhappy Times. A Selection of Journalism; compilation). Tallinn: Kunst
- 2010: "Anton Petrovitš ja sfääride muusika" (Anton Petrovich and the Music of the Spheres). Keel ja Kirjandus 7
- 2011: A. H. Tammsaare Armastusest ja lapselikkusest (A. H. Tammsaare's Of Love and Childhood; compilation). Tartu: Ilmamaa
- 2011: Irratsionaalsuse poeetika A. H. Tammsaare loomingus (The Poetics of Irrationalism in the Work of A. H. Tammsaare). Tallinn: Tallinna Ülikool
- 2014: "Ema jälg. Ema Tammsaare loomingus" (Mother's Trace. Mother in the Work of Tammsaare). Looming 6
- 2015: "Kassi maja. Kodu kuvand ja inimsuhted Mati Undi 1960.–1970. aastate loomingus" (The Cat's House. The Image of Home and Human Relationships in Mati Unt's Work of the 1960s and 1970s). Keel ja Kirjandus 4
- 2016: Tammsaare irratsionaalsuse poeetika (The Poetics of Tammsaare's Irrationalism). Tallinn: Eesti Keele Sihtasutus
- 2018: A. H. Tammsaare ütlemisi (A. H. Tammsaare's Sayings; compilation). Tallinn: Tammerraamat
- 2019: Mati Undi hämaruse poeetika (Mati Unt's Poetics of Twilight). Tallinn: Eesti Keele Sihtasutus
- 2024: Tõde ja õigus: kirjandus, mis kunagi valmis ei saa (Truth and Justice: Literature That Will Never Be Finished; compiler and article author). Tallinn: Anton Hansen Tammsaare Muuseum

== Awards and recognitions ==
- 2012: National Student Research Paper Competition, Cross-Disciplinary and Cross-Level Grand Prize
- 2012: Tallinn University Student Research Paper Competition, Best Doctoral Thesis in the Humanities Category
- 2013: Looming magazine's Critic of the Year
- 2019: Friend of Native Language Education
- 2019: Tallinn University Alumnus of the Century
- 2021: Postimees Opinion Leader of the Year
- 2023: Order of the White Star, 4th Class
- 2024: Ene Mihkelson Cultural Thinker Award

== Family ==
Maarja Vaino is the twin sister of the politician Martin Helme and the sister of the translation theorist and translator Triin van Doorslaer. Vaino has two children, and her partner is the literary scholar Toomas Haug.
