= Pukk =

Family name

Origin
- Region of origin: Estonia

Pukk is an Estonian surname, and may refer to:

- Aapo Pukk (born 1962), Estonian artist
- Holger Pukk (1920–1997), Estonian writer
- Otto Pukk (1900–1951), Estonian politician
