= Kirsipuu =

Family name

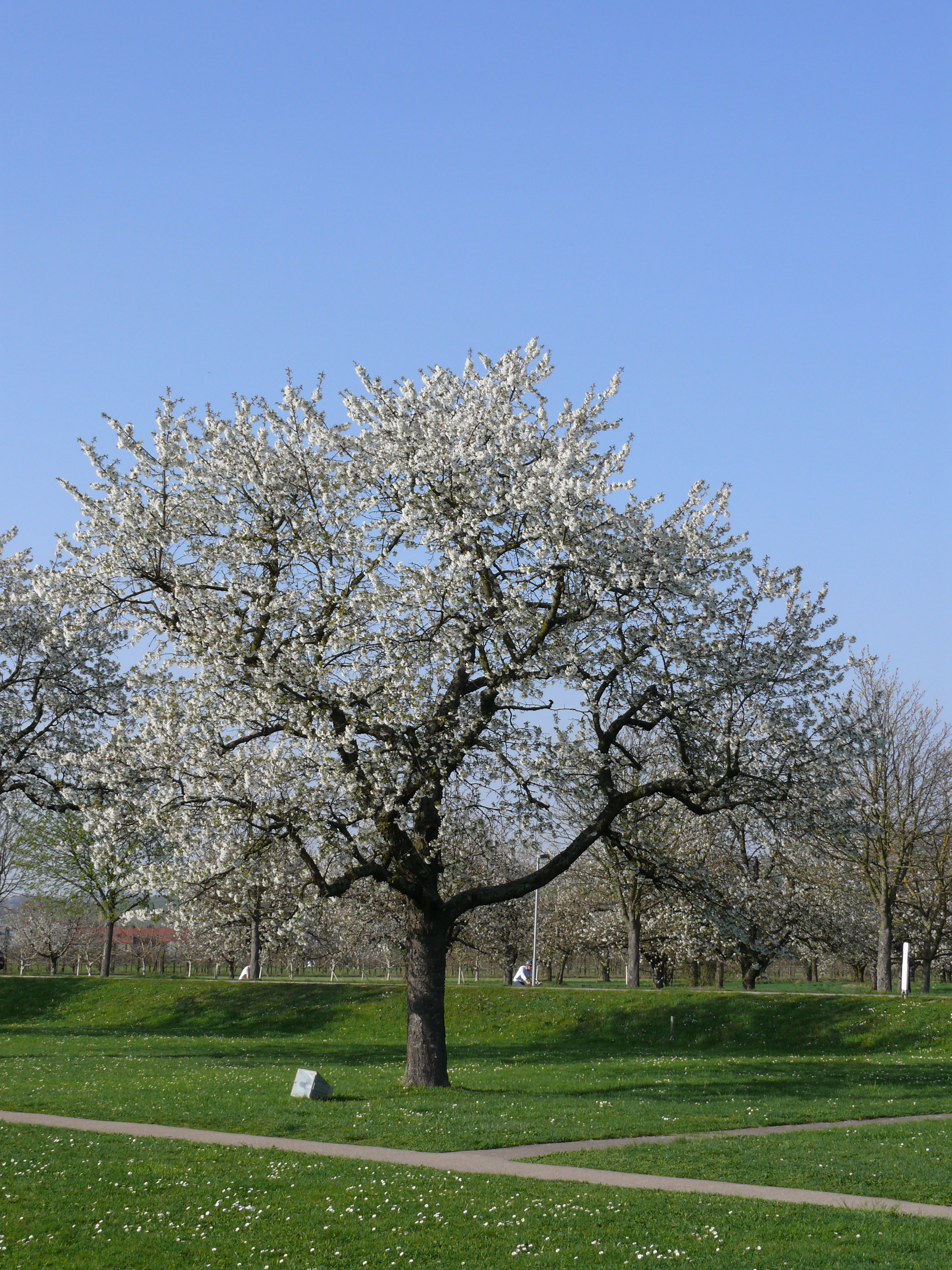

Origin
- Language: Estonian
- Meaning: Cherrytree
- Region of origin: Estonia

Other names
- Variant forms: Kirs, Kirss

Kirsipuu is a common surname in Estonia (meaning cherrytree), and may refer to:

- Artur Kirsipuu (1897–1984), architect
- Jaan Kirsipuu (born 1969), road bicycle racer
- Tiiu Kirsipuu (born 1957), sculptor
- Nele Kirsipuu (born 1990), singer
- Valve Kirsipuu (1933–2017), economist and politician
