= Tiiu Kirsipuu =

Estonian sculptor (born 1957)

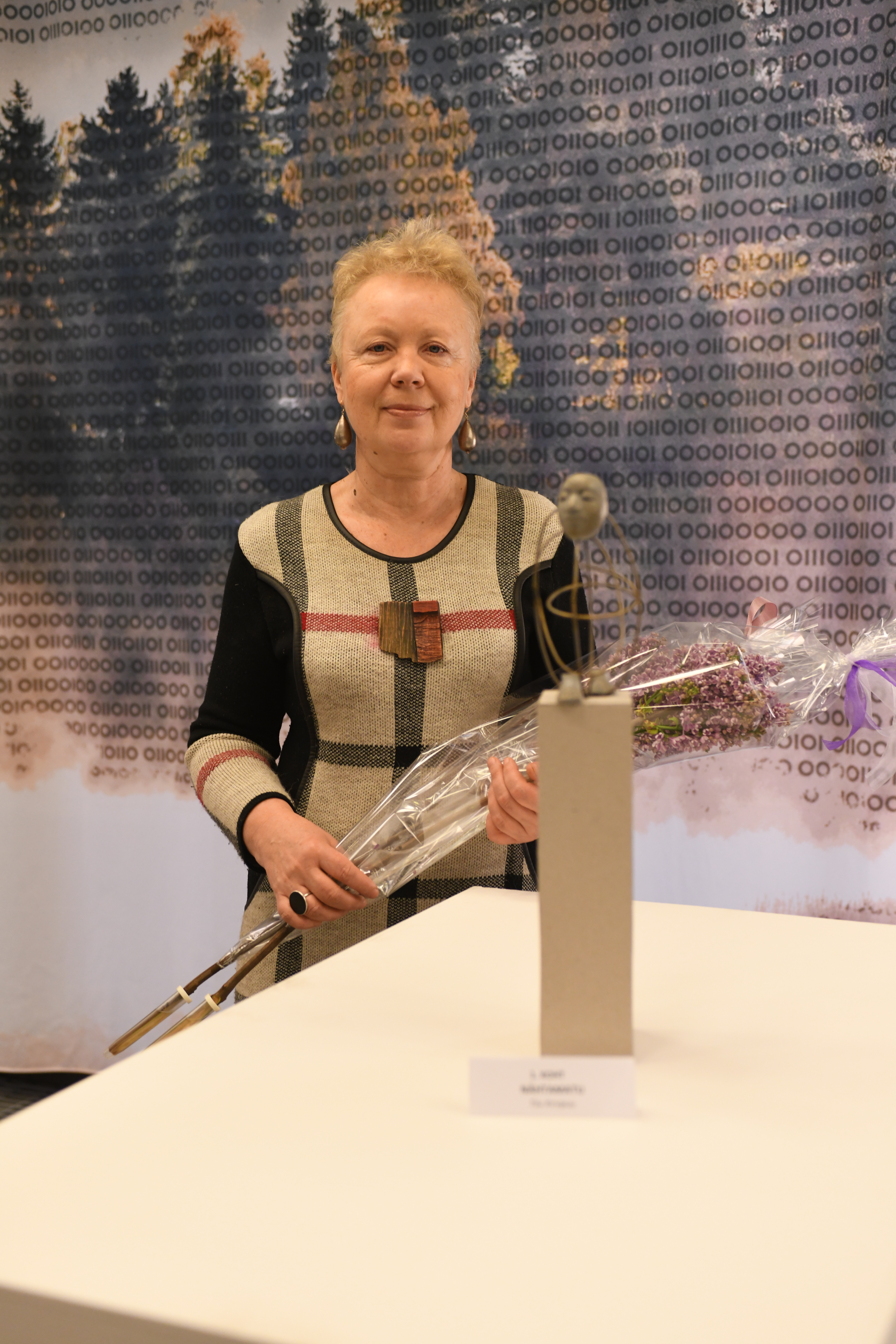
- Tiiu Kirsipuu in 2020
- Born: October 29, 1957 (age 68); Tartu, then part of Estonian SSR, Soviet Union
- Education: Estonian Academy of Arts
- Occupation: Sculptor

Tiiu Kirsipuu (born October 29, 1957) is an Estonian sculptor.

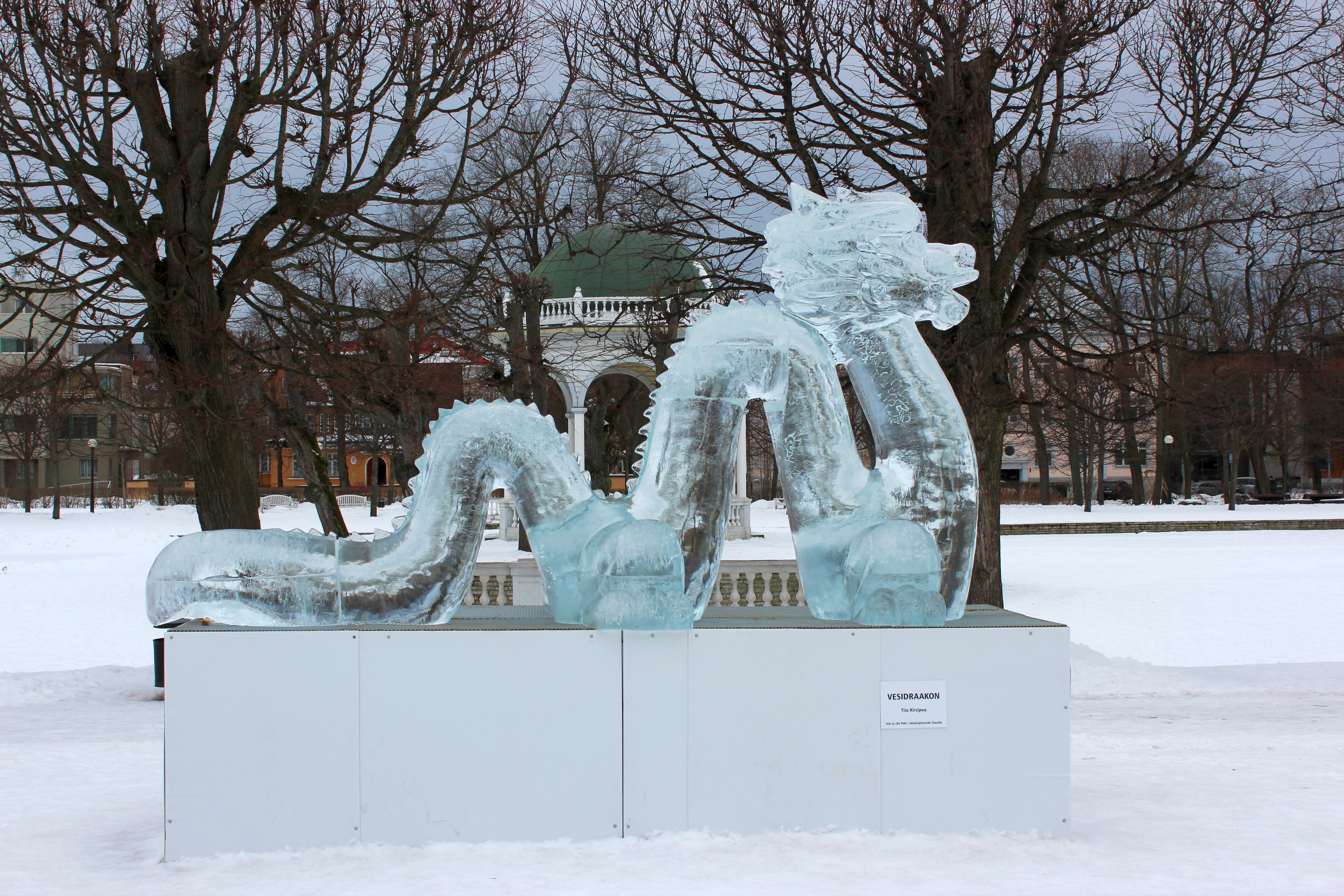
Kirsipuu's ice sculpture Vesidraakon (Water Dragon) in Tallinn (2012)

Kirsipuu's creations range from a coin measuring a few centimeters to a sculpture 8 meters (26 ft) long. Her works employ both realistic and abstract forms, and she uses many materials to realize her ideas. Among her best-known works is the Sculpture of Oscar Wilde and Eduard Vilde in Tartu.

== Early life and education ==
Tiiu Kirsipuu was born in Tartu. She attended Miina Härma Primary and Secondary School in Tartu from 1965 to 1975 and Tallinn Secondary School No. 46 from 1975 to 1976. In 1983, she graduated from the Tallinn State Applied Art Institute of the ESSR (now the Estonian National Art Institute), majoring in sculpture. Her instructors included the sculptor Kalju Reitel.

== Career ==
From 1983 to 1987, she supervised a sculpture class at the Nõmme Pioneers Palace, from 1987 to 1993 she was a freelance artist, and from 1993 to 2003 she worked as a lecturer at the Estonian Academy of Arts and from 2003 to 2019 as a lecturer at Tallinn University. Since 2019, she has been working as a freelance artist in Tallinn.

She has held solo exhibitions in Estonia, Finland, Germany, Holland, France, China, Russia, and Belgium, and she has participated in numerous group exhibitions both in Estonia and abroad. Kirsipuu has taken part in many international sculpture symposiums and competitions, and she has created snow and ice sculptures. She has also designed several commemorative plaques, awards, and memorial sculptures.

Kirsipuu was the organizer of Sagadi International Wood Sculpture Symposium.

She has been a member of the Estonian Artists' Association since 1987 and also belongs to the Estonian Sculptors' Association.

In 2012, the film Tiiu Kirsipuu. Edu kood (Tiiu Kirsipuu. Code of Success) by Rein Raamat was released.

== Works ==
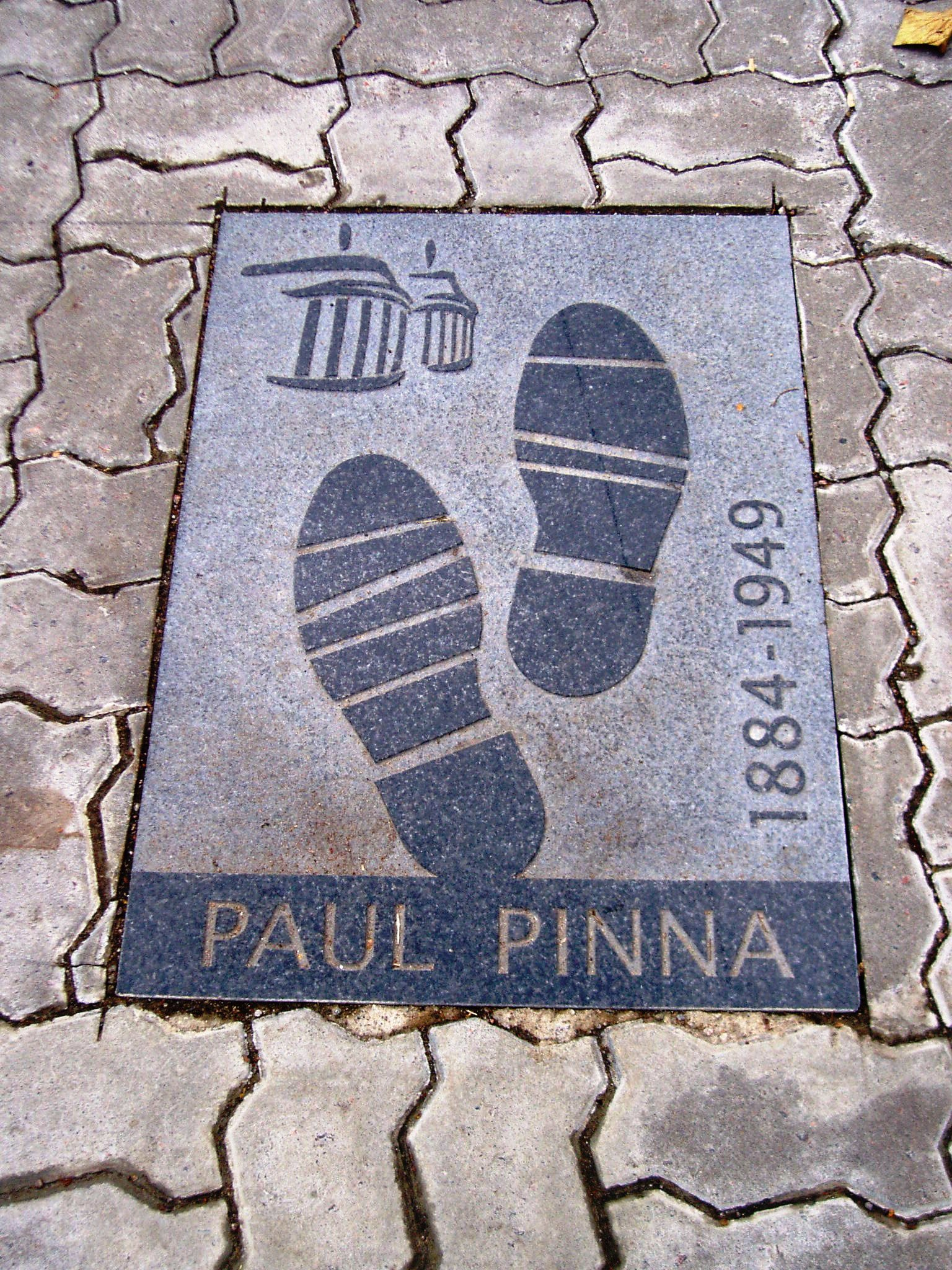
Kirsipuu has created granite plaques of the footprints of former Estonia Theater actors on the streets of Tallinn

Kirsipuu's best-known work is the sculpture of Sculpture of Oscar Wilde and Eduard Vilde on Vallikraavi tänav (Moat Street) in Tartu—that is, a statue of the "two Wildes." In this work created in 1999, the bronze figures of the writers Eduard Vilde and Oscar Wilde sit side by side on a bench. A replica of this sculpture has also been made. To mark Estonia's accession to the European Union, Estonia and the city of Tartu donated a copy of the sculpture to the city of Galway in Ireland in 2004.

She has created numerous sculptures and memorials displayed in public spaces. Examples include the Kaarnakivi (Raven's Stone) memorial to the writer Juhan Jaik in Rõuge (1999), the monument to the 100th anniversary of the Estonia Theater in Tallinn (2006), the Johan Skytte Monument on Toomemägi in Tartu (2006), and the sculpture of a seated musician at the Vanemuine Concert Hall in Tartu (2009). She also created the sculpture Igavene Üliõpilane Juulius (The Eternal Student Juulius, 2008) located at the Tallinn University of Technology, the Stone Bridge Model (2003) located near the Arch Bridge in Tartu, the sculpture Tüdruk linnuga (Girl with a Bird) located in the University of Tartu Botanical Garden (1987; originally in front of the Tartu Student Club), and the Ants Sööt Monument (2015) in Elva.

Kirsipuu has designed several coins commissioned by the Bank of Estonia. These are an EEK 15.65 gold commemorative coin (1999), a silver commemorative coin for the anniversary of the University of Tartu (2001), a silver commemorative coin for the 100th anniversary of the Estonia Theater (2006), and a silver coin dedicated to the 2008 Summer Olympics (2008).

She created a bronze bust of the poet Robert Burns that stands in the Kirsipuu Garden of the Scottish Club (Estonian: Šoti klubi) in Tallinn's Old Town (2005). Since January 2011, there has also been a cast bronze bust of Sean Connery created by Kirsipuu, and since 2015 a memorial bust of Admiral Edwyn Alexander-Sinclair. Kirsipuu also created the granite soldier sculpture on the Petseri County War of Independence Monument erected in 2020 (a copy of the original sculpture by Roman Haavamägi).

In 2019, the 6-meter (20 ft) metal sculpture Tallinn–Chengdu was completed in Chengdu, Tallinn's sister city. Works for public spaces by Kirsipuu can also be found in Latvia, Austria, and Changchun, China. Since 2007, she has created several sculptures of well-known Estonian cultural figures such as Matti Milius, Tõnu Aav, Andres Dvinjaninov, Ülo Vilimaa, Mark Soosaar, Hardi Volmer, Leonhard Lapin, and Peeter Laurits.

== Awards and recognitions ==
- 2010: Anton Starkopf Fellowship
- 2010: Kristjan Raud Art Award (portraits with a technologically innovative solution, Rollimäng 'Role play' sculpture exhibition)
- 2019: Order of the White Star, Fourth Class

== Gallery ==
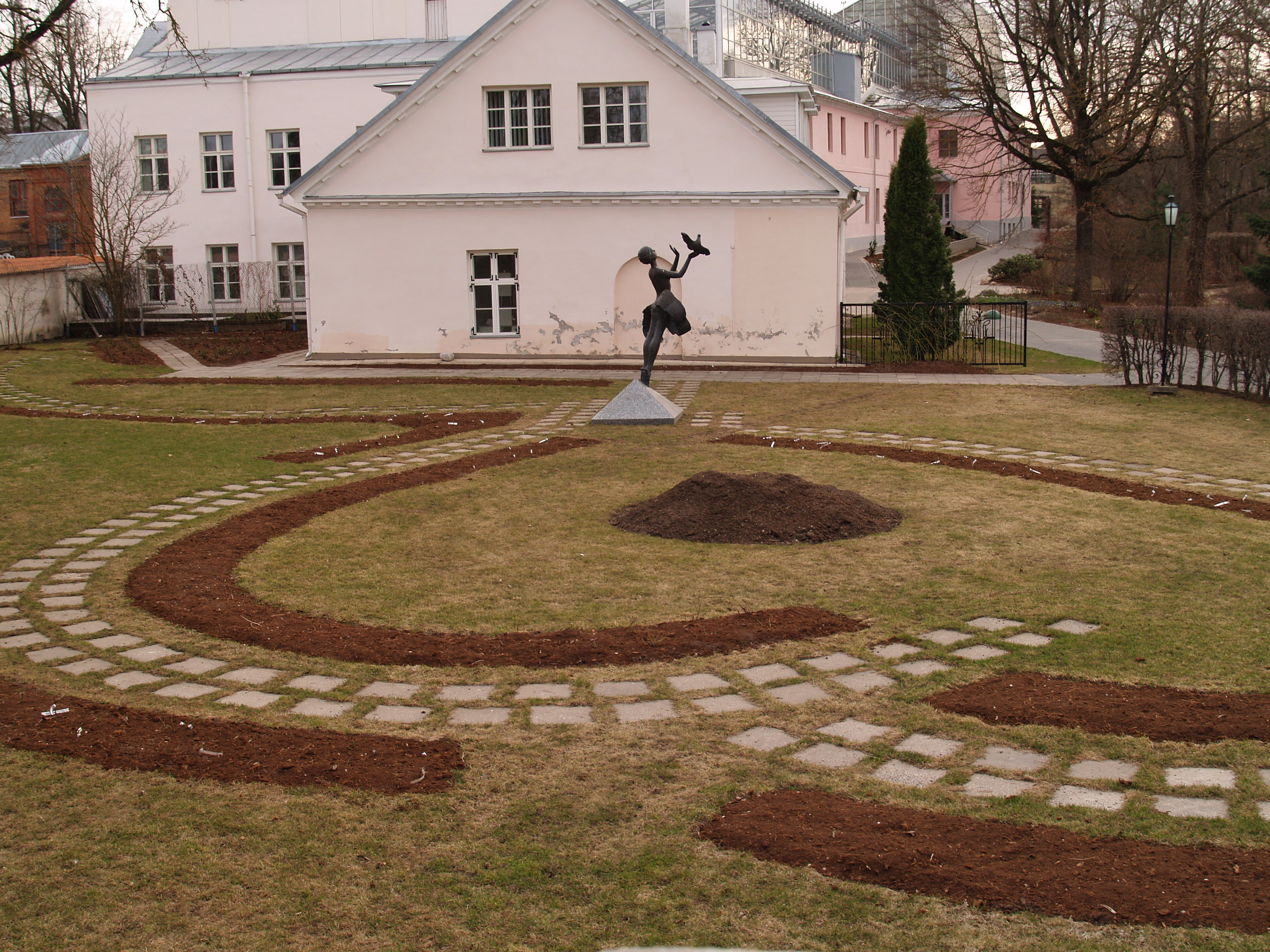
Tüdruk linnuga (A Girl with a Bird) (1987) in the University of Tartu botanical garden

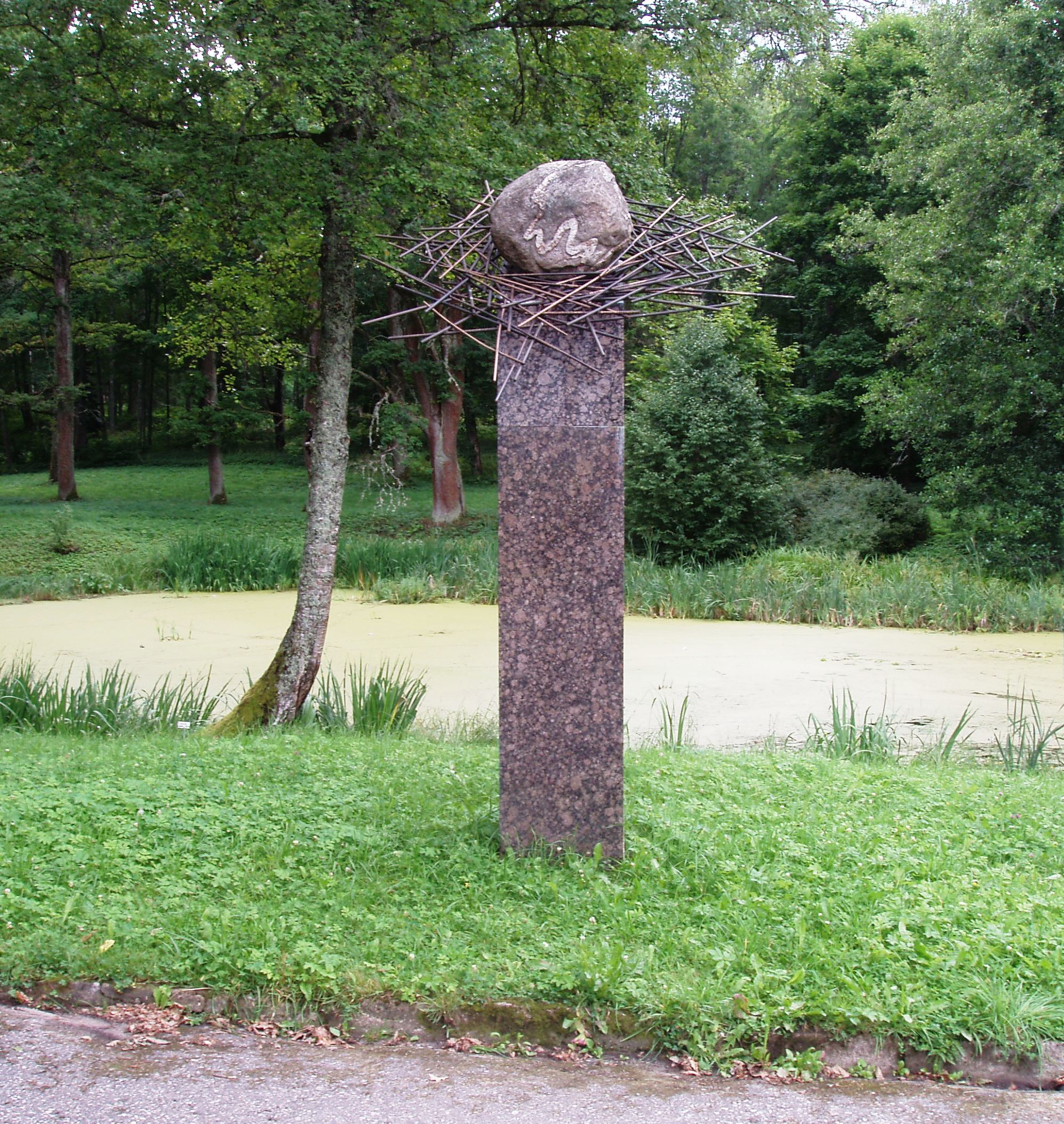
Kaarnakivi (Raven's Stone) in Rõuge (1999)

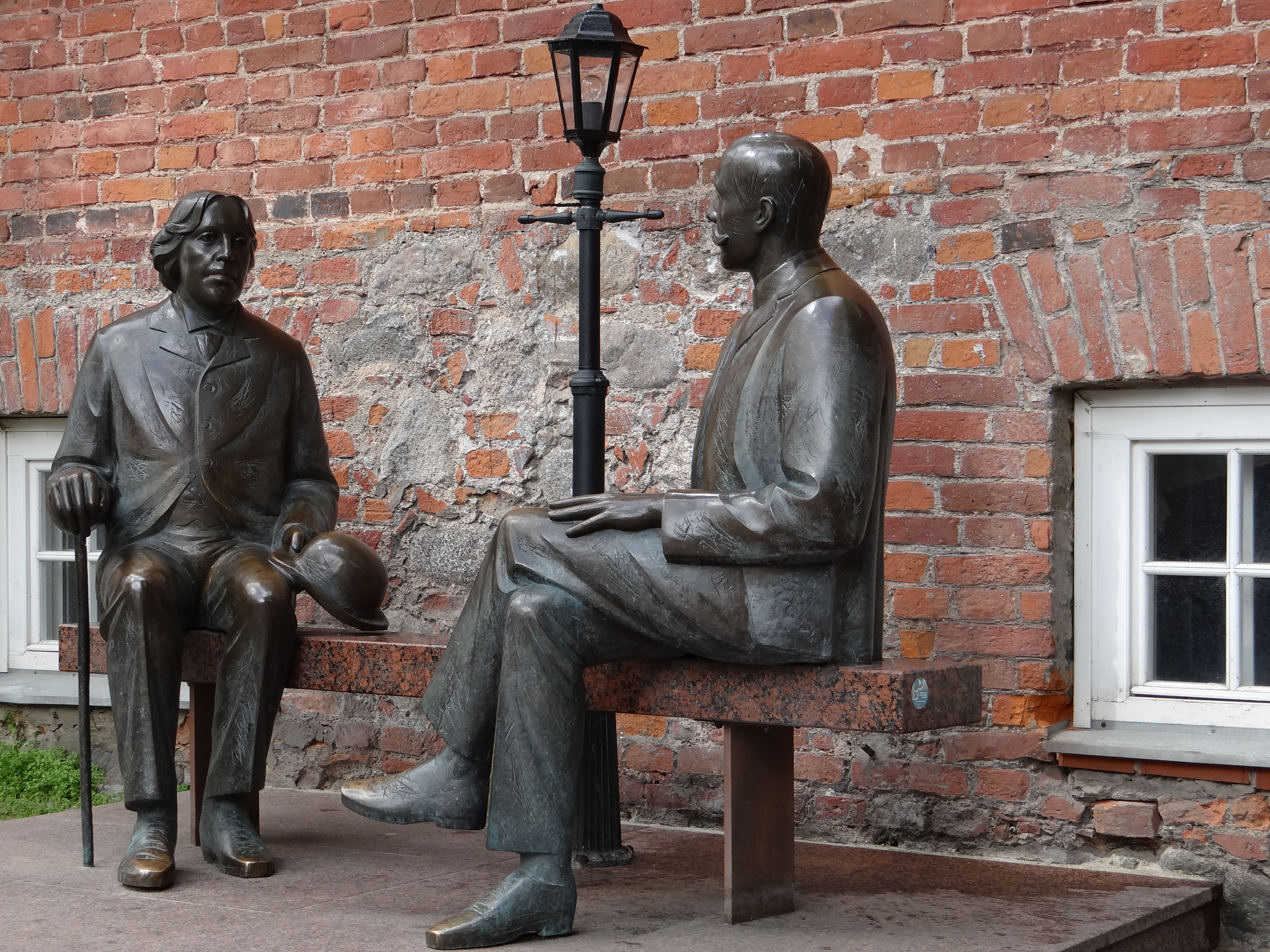
Sculpture of Oscar Wilde and Eduard Vilde in Tartu (1999)

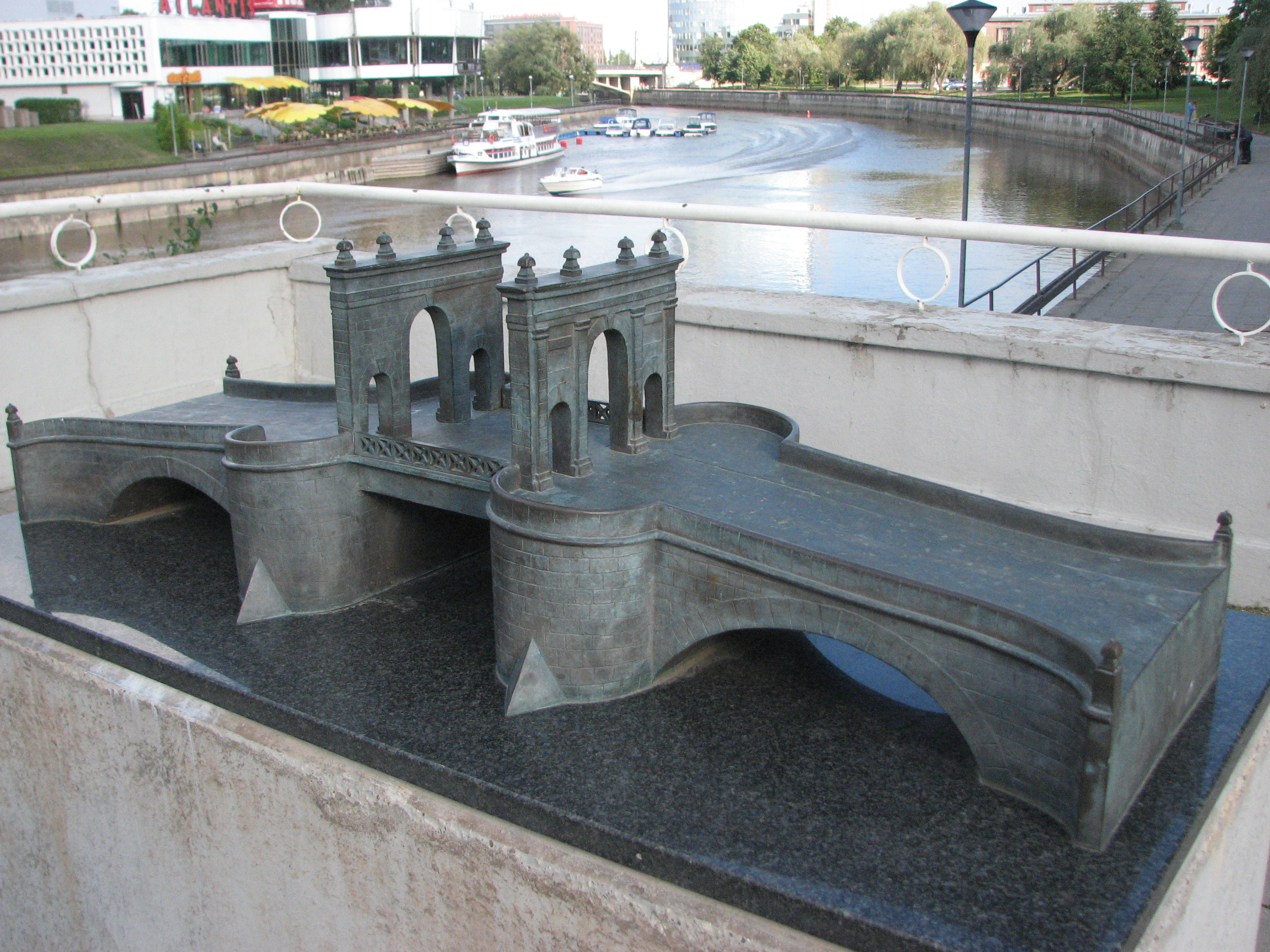
Stone Bridge Model in Tartu (2003)

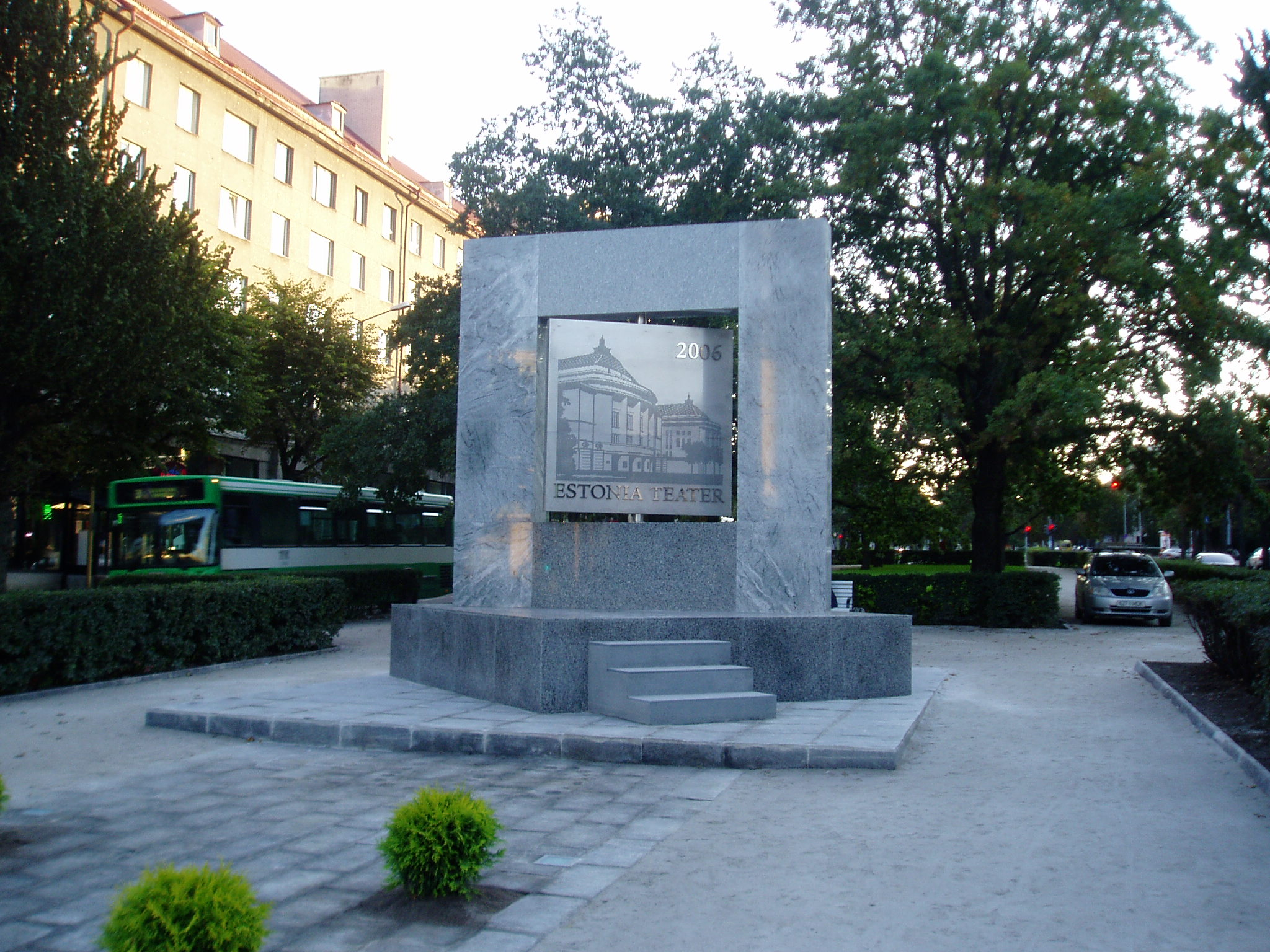
Monument to the 100th anniversary of the Estonia Theater (2006)

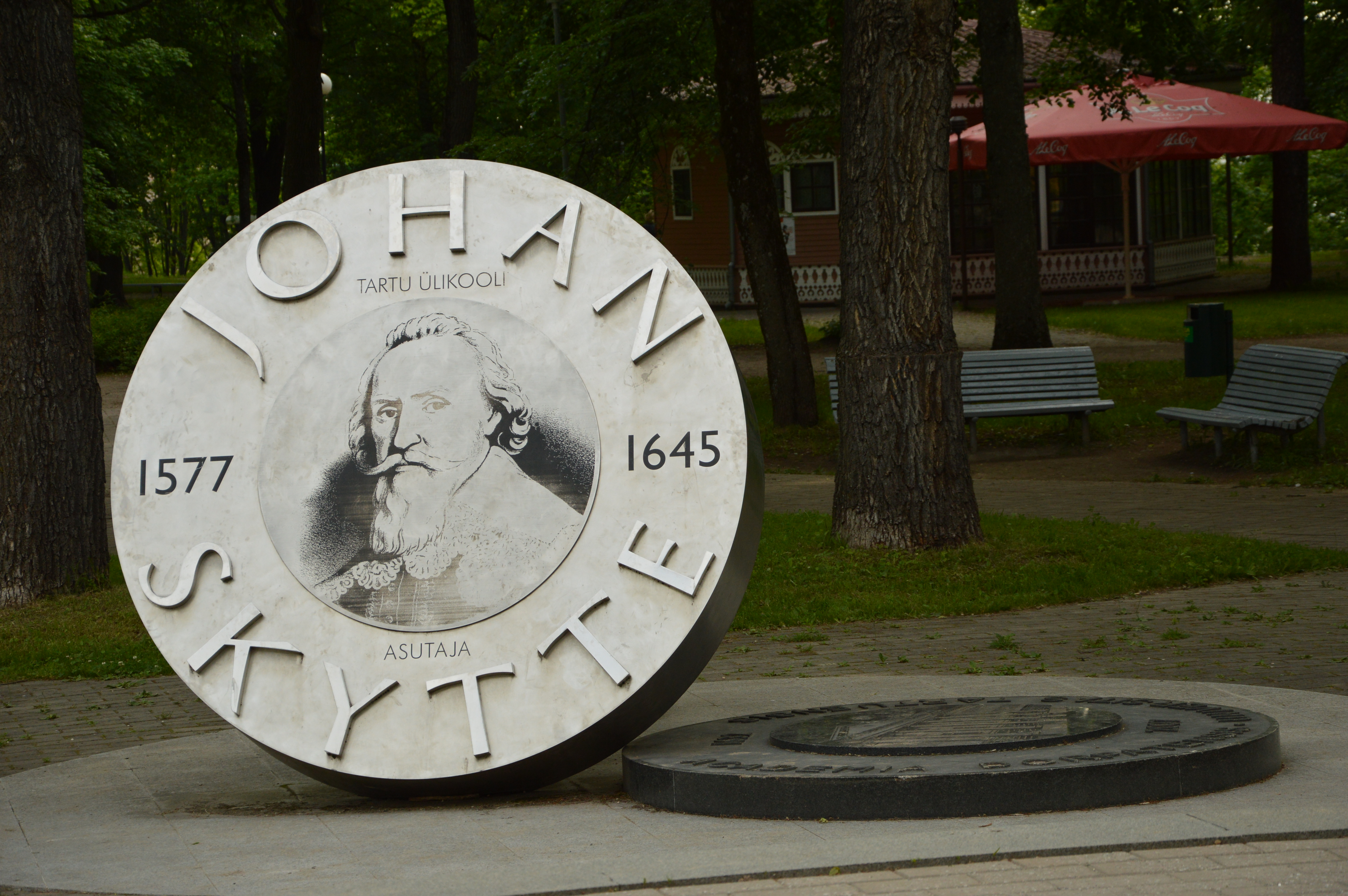
Johan Skytte Monument on Toomemägi (2007)

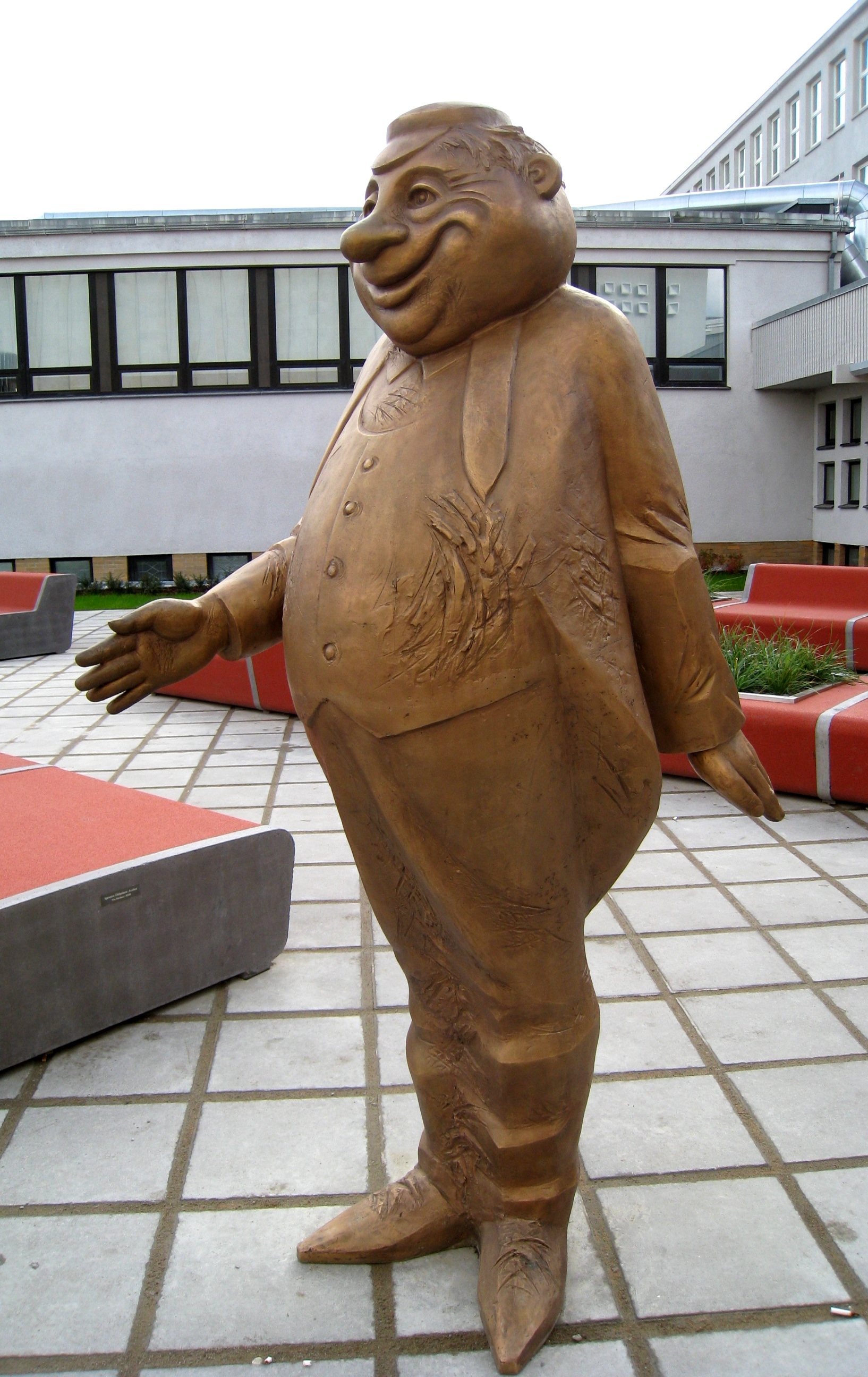
Igavene Üliõpilane Juulius (The Eternal Student Juulius, 2008)

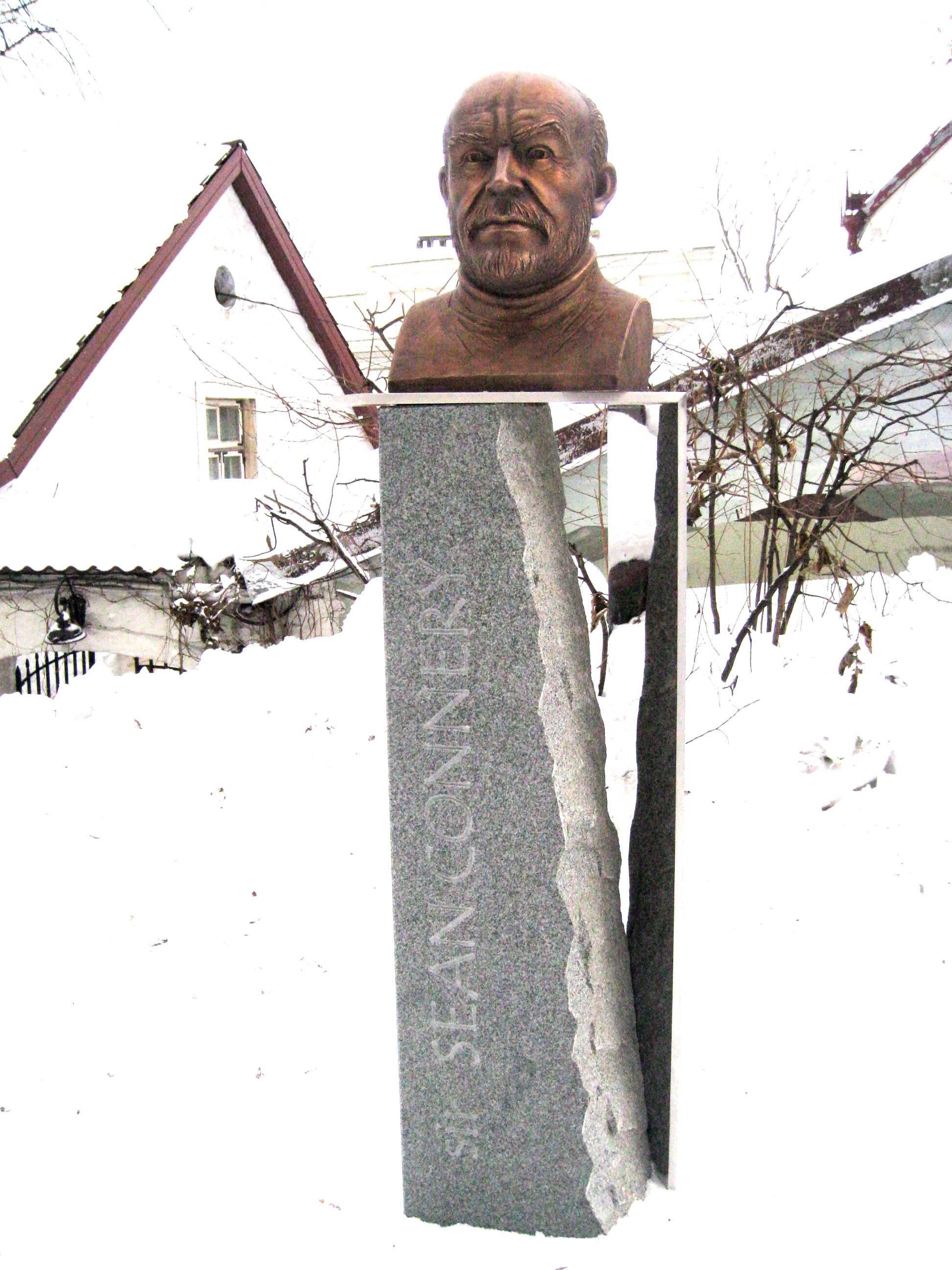
Bronze bust of Sean Connery (2011)

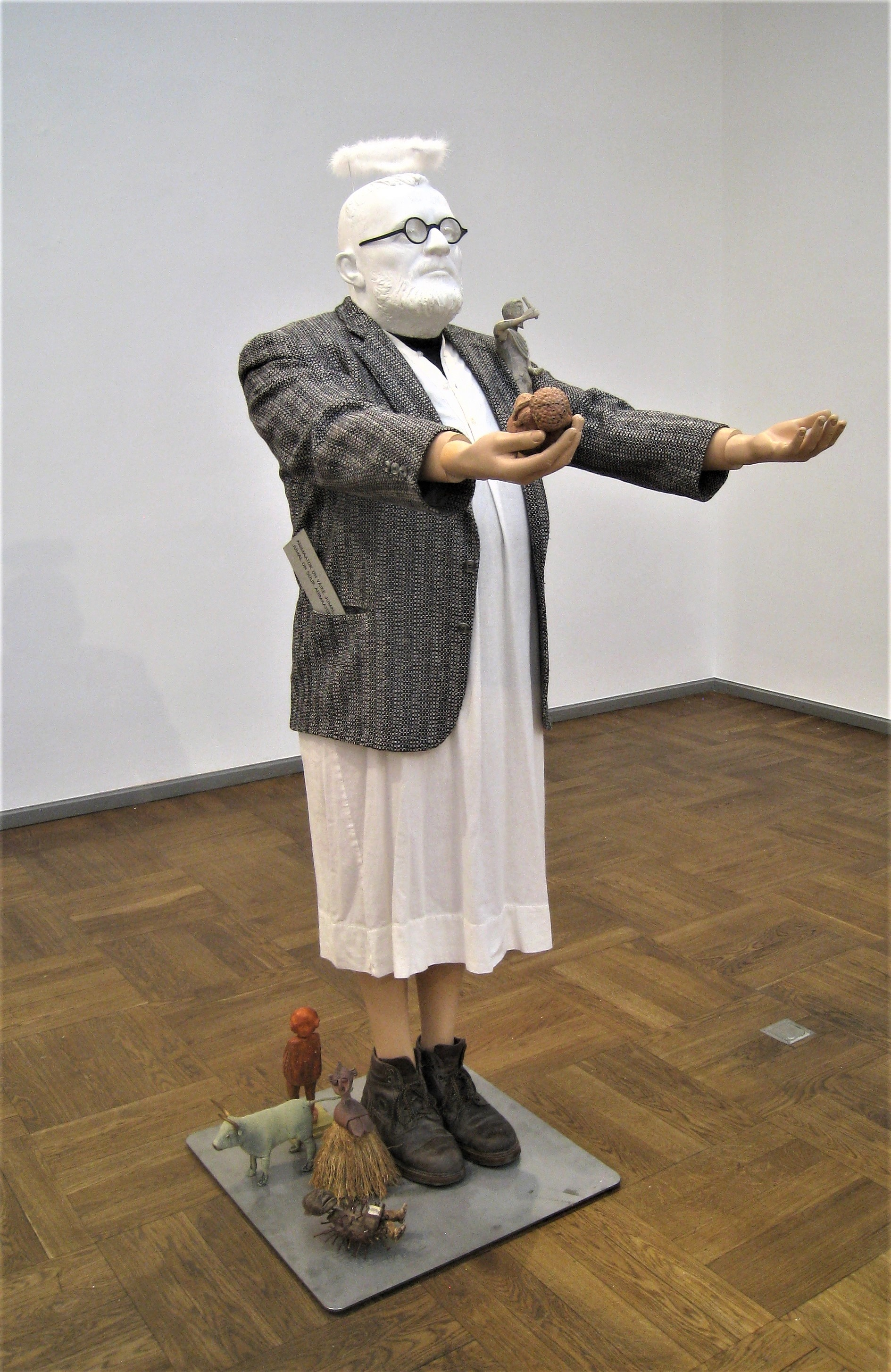
Sculpture of Hardi Volmer (2015)

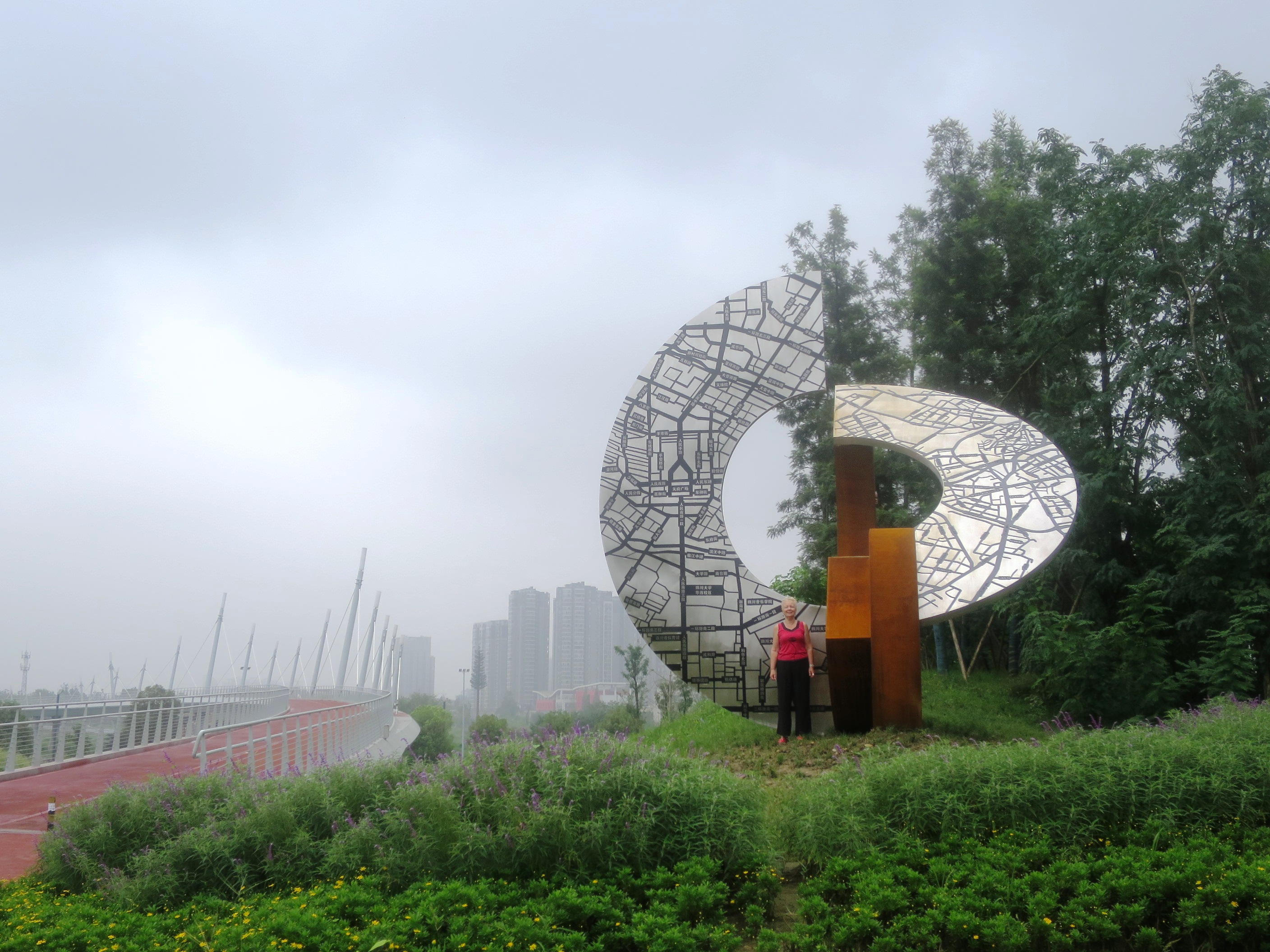
The metal sculpture Tallinn–Chengdu (2019)
