= Sirje Helme =

Estonian art historian and art critic (born 1949)

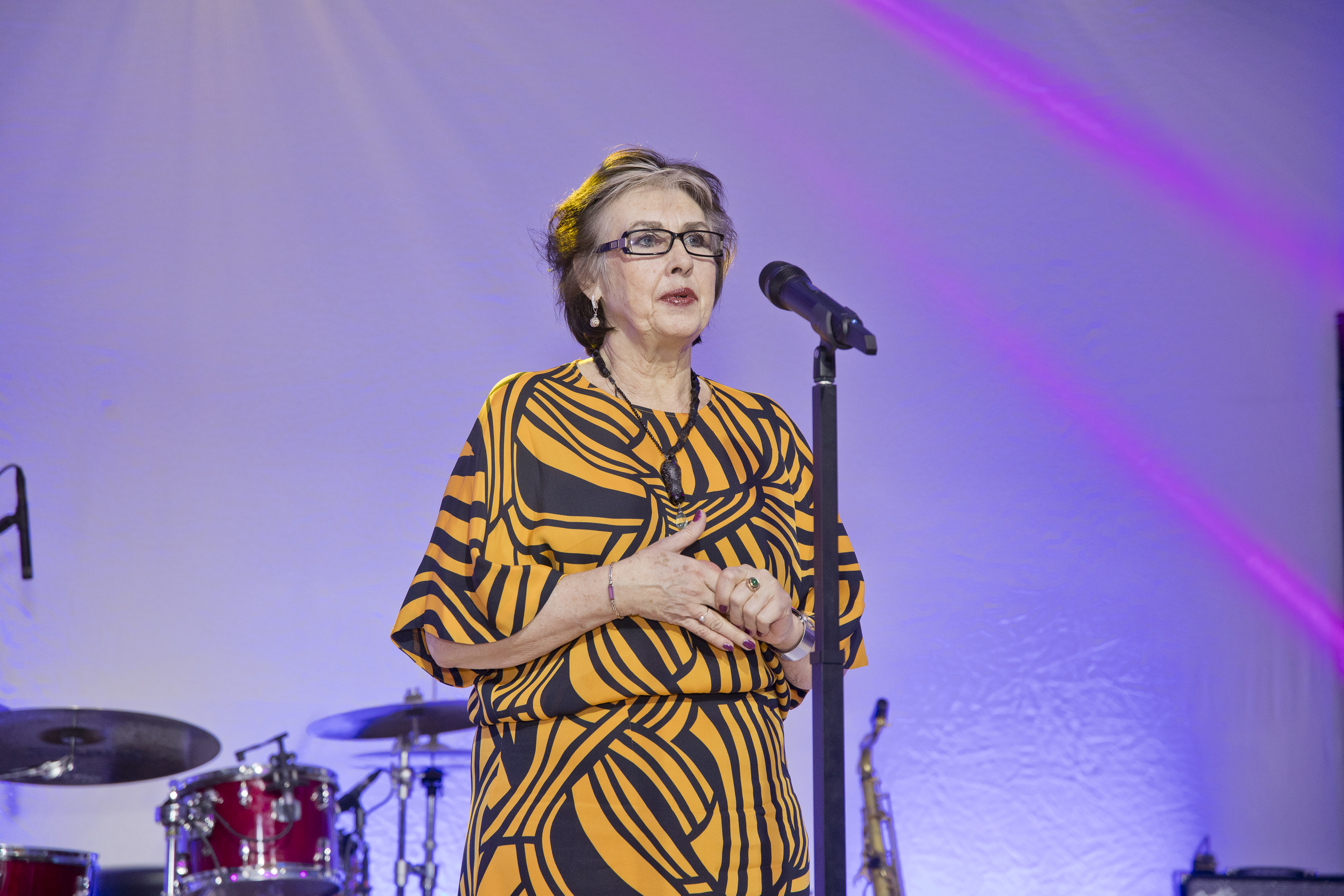
- Sirje Helme in 2018
- Born: Sirje Reitel; January 1, 1949 (age 77); Tallinn, then part of Estonian SSR, Soviet Union
- Education: University of Tartu
- Occupations: Art historian and critic
- Spouse(s): Mart Helme (divorced); Ando Keskküla
- Children: Martin Helme; Maarja Vaino
- Father: Kalju Reitel

Sirje Helme (née Sirje Reitel; born January 1, 1949) is an Estonian art historian and art critic.

== Early life and education ==
Sirje Helme was born in Tallinn, the daughter of the sculptor Kalju Reitel (1921–2004) and the makeup artist Silvia Reitel (née Taalmann, later Kromanov; 1926–1990). She graduated from Tallinn School No. 21 in 1967 and from Tartu State University in 1973 as an art historian. In 1995 she defended her master's thesis in art history, and in 2013 her doctoral dissertation Sõjajärgse modernismi ja avangardi probleeme eesti kunstis (Problems of Post-War Modernism and Avant-Garde in Estonian Art).

== Career ==
From 1973 to 1975 she was the editor of the Kunst publishing house, from 1975 to 1996 the editor-in-chief of the almanac Kunst, from 1989 to 1990 the editor-in-chief of the Kunst publishing house, and from 1990 to 1992 the director of the Kunst publishing house. From 1993 to 2008 she was a member of the board of the Kunst AS publishing house. From 1992 to 2005 she was the director of the Estonian Center for Contemporary Art, and from 1995 to 1996 the coordinator of the Soros Centers for Contemporary Art network.

In 2005, Helme started working as the director of the Kumu Art Museum. From 2009 to 2016, she worked as the director general of the Art Museum of Estonia, and she has been a member of the board of the Art Museum of Estonia Foundation since 2016.

== Academic activities ==
Helme lectured on modernism and Estonian art after the Second World War from 1989 to 1994 at the Estonian Academy of Music and Theater; in 1997/1998 and since 2003 at the University of Tartu; and from 2000 to 2009 and since 2020 at the Estonian Academy of Arts. During the 2012/2013 academic year, she was a professor of liberal arts at the University of Tartu.

Her articles on art have been published in journals in Estonia, Latvia, Finland, Germany, Croatia, Poland, Sweden, Italy, Russia, and elsewhere. She has curated exhibitions in Estonia, Lithuania, Finland, Bosnia and Herzegovina, Poland, and Germany.

== Works ==
- 1999: Lühike Eesti kunsti ajalugu (A Brief History of Estonian Art), with Jaak Kangilaski. Tallinn: Kunst
- 2000: Viron Taiteen Historia (A History of Estonian Art), Finnish translation, with Jaak Kangilaski. Helsinki: Taifuuni
- 2000: Jüri Okas (with Tamara Luuk). Tallinn: Eesti Keele Sihtasutus
- 2010: Popkunst Forever. Eesti popkunst 1960. ja 1970.aastate vahetusel (Pop Art Forever. Estonian Pop Art at the Turn of the 1960s and 1970s). Tallinn: Eesti Kunstimuuseum
- 2013: "Kujutavas kunstis toimunud muutused: taastamine, kohanemine, uuenemine (1955–69)" (Changes in the Visual Arts: Restoration, Adaptation, Renewal, 1955–1969). In: Eesti kunsti ajalugu. 1940–1991, vol. 6, part 1, pp. 233–365. Tallinn: Eesti Kunstiakadeemia, SA Kultuurileht
- 2016: "Paradigmamuutus kümnendivahetusel. Popkunst. Kontseptuaalne ja geomeetriline kunst" (Paradigm Shift at the Turn of the Decade. Pop Art. Conceptual and Geometric Art). In: Eesti kunsti ajalugu. 1940–1991. vol. 6, part 2, pp. 29–76. Tallinn: Eesti Kunstiakadeemia, SA Kultuurileht
- 2016: "Realismi mõiste hajumine ja peavool kunstis" (The Dispersion of the Concept of Realism and the Mainstream in Art). In: Eesti kunsti ajalugu. 1940–1991. vol. 6, part 2, pp. 83–180. Tallinn: Eesti Kunstiakadeemia, SA Kultuurileht
- 2016: "Kaheksakümnendate lõpuaastad" (The Late Eighties). In: Eesti kunsti ajalugu. 1940–1991. vol. 6, part 2, pp. 181–224. Tallinn: Eesti Kunstiakadeemia, SA Kultuurileht
- 2017: 101 Eesti kunstiteost (101 Estonian Works of Art). Tallinn: Varrak
- 2017: Jüri Okas, editor and article author. Tallinn: Eesti Kunstimuuseum
- 2018: Leonhard Lapin: Tühjus ja ruum (Leonhard Lapin. Void and Space), compilation and article author. Tallinn: Eesti Kunstimuuseum
- 2018: Eesti kunsti 100 aastat (100 Years of Estonian Art). Tallinn: Post Factum

== Memberships ==
- 1981: Member of the Estonian Artists' Association
- 1992: Member of the International Association of Art Critics (AICA), member of the International Council of Museums (ICOM)
- 1993: Member of the Estonian Society of Art Historians and Art Critics
- 1999–2003: Member of the Council of APEXchange (Amsterdam), part of the European Cultural Foundation
- 1999: Founding member of the Baltic Art Center (Visby, Sweden)
- 1999–2003: Member of the Council of the Baltic Art Center (Visby, Sweden)
- 2000–: Member of the Museums Board under the Estonian Ministry of Culture
- 2005–2016: Member of the Expert Committee of the Latvian Museum of Contemporary Art collection
- 2007–2011: Member of the Council of the international foundation Manifesta
- 2007: Member of the International Committee for Museums and Collections of Modern Art (CiMAM)
- 2008: Founding member of the Latvian Museum of Contemporary Art association
- 2008: European Cultural Foundation art expert, jury member
- 2008–2011: Member of the Board of Trustees of the University of Tartu
- 2010–2021: Member of the National Identity Award Committee of the University of Tartu
- 2014: Honorary member of the Estonian Artists' Union

== Awards ==
- 1996: Annual Award of the Estonian Cultural Endowment for Fine and Applied Arts (curating the Estonian section of the exhibition Personaalne aeg 'Personal Time')
- 2001: Live and Shine Scholarship
- 2004: Order of Merit of the Italian Republic
- 2005: Order of the White Star, fourth class
- 2008: Kristjan Raud Art Award (successful launch and management of the Kumu Art Museum)
- 2008: Order of Orange-Nassau, Netherlands
- 2008: Officer of the Order of Leopold, Belgium
- 2012: Knight of the Order of Arts and Letters, France
- 2013: Order of Merit of the Estonian Ministry of Foreign Affairs
- 2015: Estonian Ministry of Foreign Affairs Cultural Award
- 2023: Commander, 3rd class, Royal Swedish Order of the Polar Star (for services in developing relations between Estonia and Sweden)
- 2024: Estonian Lifetime Achievement Award for Culture
