= Loodi =

Village in Estonia

- Village
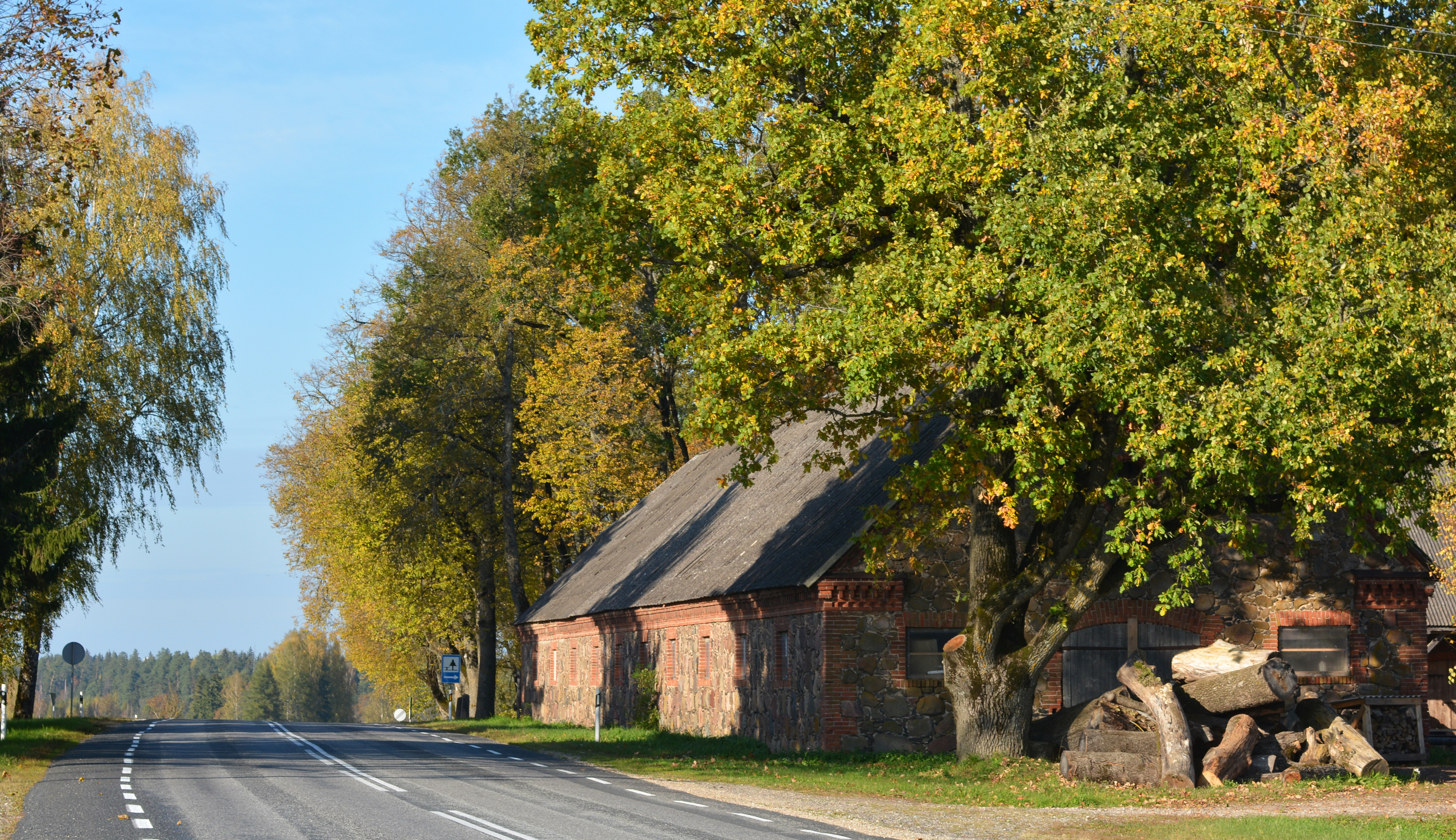
- Road through Loodi, Loodi manor stable on right

- Location within Estonia
- Coordinates: 58.273055555556°N 25.583333333333°E
- Country: Estonia
- County: Viljandi County
- Parish: Viljandi Parish
- Time zone: UTC+2 (EET)
  - Summer (DST): UTC+3 (EEST)

Loodi is a village in Viljandi Parish, Viljandi County in Estonia. It was a part of Paistu Parish until 2013.

== Notable people ==
Notable people that were born or lived in Loodi include the following:

- Udo-Nestor Ivask (1878–1922), bibliophile, book historian, and bookplate artist
