= Matti Milius =

Estonian art collector (1945–2015)

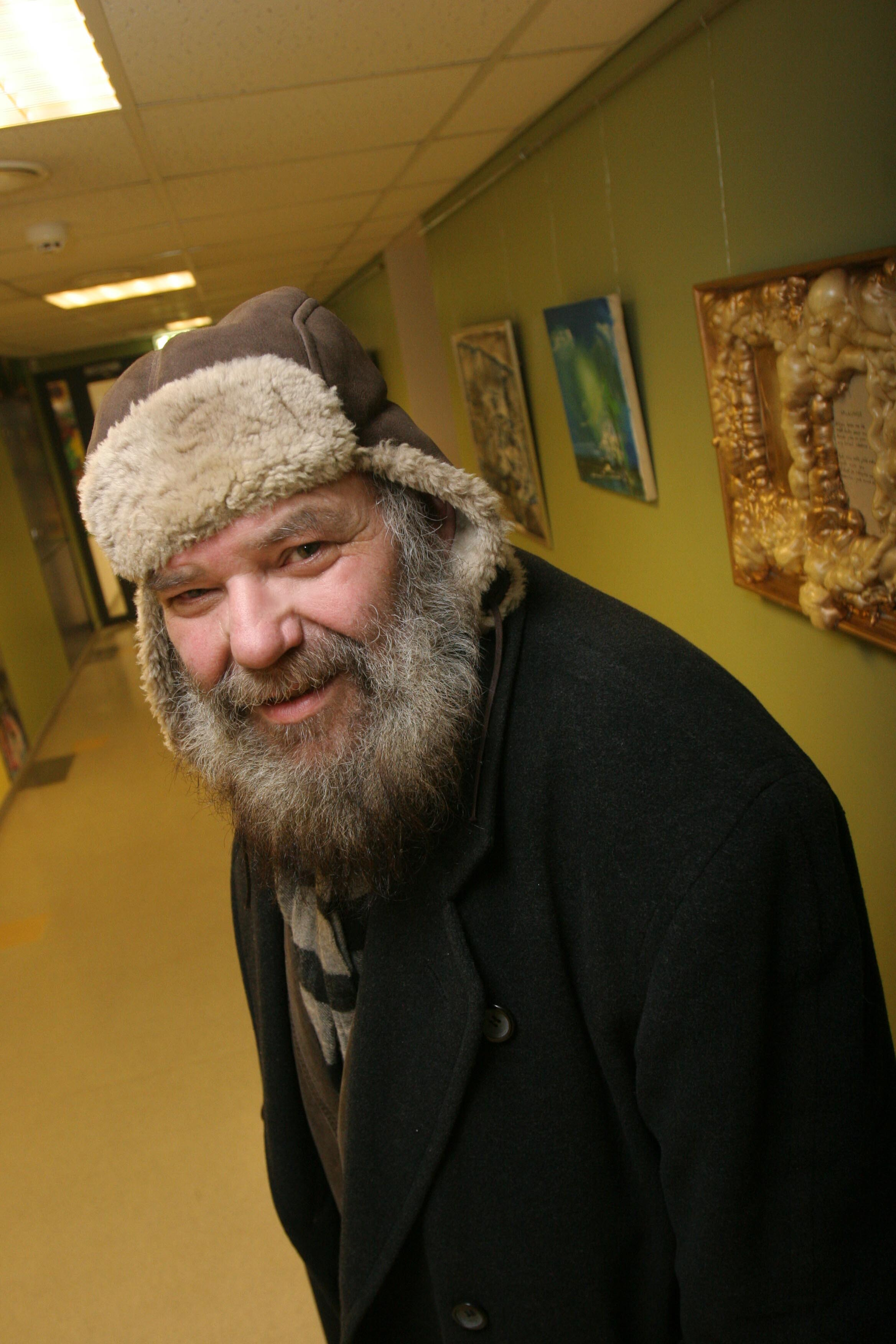
- Matti Milius in January 2010
- Born: November 10, 1945; Tartu, Estonia
- Died: June 3, 2015 (aged 69); Tartu, Estonia
- Education: Viljandi School of Cultural Education
- Occupation: Art collector

Matti Milius (November 10, 1945 – June 3, 2015) was an Estonian art collector. He lived in Tartu and was one of the biggest collectors of Estonian and Baltic contemporary art and a curator of art exhibitions. Milius owned a large collection of bookplates, graphics, and paintings consisting of more than 1,200 works. From 1968 onward, Milius exhibited works from his collection at exhibitions in Estonia and abroad.

== Education and early years ==
Matti Milius attended Tartu High School No. 1 for Young Workers (now Tartu Adult High School), where he graduated in 1967. He attended the Viljandi School of Cultural Education, where he majored in librarianship, and he graduated in 1969.

The Milius art collection started in 1962 thanks to a classmate's mother, Helene Ivask-Kulpa, who was the daughter of the literary scholar and bookplate researcher Udo-Nestor Ivask. She gave Milius a bookplate every time the young man got a good grade in science, English, or Russian. In 1966, Milius met the art collector Mart Lepp, at whose initiative he became interested in older Estonian graphics. Peeter Urbla sparked Milius's interest in contemporary art in 1968.

== Career ==
From 1970 to 1980, Milius was engaged in samizdat, copying and distributing the works of several authors on a typewriter, and publishing self-published collections, including the almanacs Karjamaa (Pasture) and Sõna (Word). He was under constant surveillance by the KGB.

In the 1980s and 1990s, Matti Milius also worked as a performance artist and poetry performer, being one half of the poetry duo Matti Moguči and Matti Moguchi (Priidu Beier wrote poetry for Moguči and Albert Trapeež for Moguchi).

In 2006, Matti Milius organized an exhibition festival in Tartu and Kaunas, where the works of dozens of Kaunas artists were shown in Tartu and those of Tartu artists in Kaunas. Before his death, Milius mainly focused on contemporary art from Estonia, Latvia, Lithuania, and Armenia.

== Affiliations ==
Matti Milius was a member of the Tartu Artists' Association and Estonian Artists' Association.

== Recognitions and awards ==
- 2003: Honorary title of Tartu Bearer of Culture in the producer category
