= Kalju Reitel =

Estonian sculptor (1921–2004)

- Born: February 1, 1921; Tapa, Estonia
- Died: September 10, 2004 (aged 83); Tallinn, Estonia
- Resting place: Metsakalmistu, Tallinn, Estonia
- Occupation: Sculptor
- Children: Sirje Helme
- Relatives: Maarja Vaino; Martin Helme

Kalju Kumar Reitel (February 11, 1921 – September 10, 2004) was an Estonian sculptor.

== Early life and education ==
Kalju Reitel was born in Tapa, Estonia, the son of Rudolf Heinrich Reitel (1887–1923) and Alice Maria Reitel (née Tirman, later Rööpson; 1892–1973). He attended Gustav Adolf High School in Tallinn from 1934 to 1936 and Tapa High School from 1936 to 1941. From 1942 to 1943 he studied at the Tallinn School of Fine and Applied Arts.

Reitel's art education was interrupted by the Second World War. During the first Soviet occupation of Estonia, he evaded mobilization in 1941 by hiding in a bog near Aegviidu, but he was captured one day before the German occupation of Estonia. Reitel joined the German army as a volunteer and performed photo reconnaissance at Tallinn Airport. In 1943, he was among the 20 men selected (from 300 applicants) to study at the Liepāja-Grobiņa flight school (German: Flugzeugführerschule A / B Libau / Grobin). He then served as a pilot in a unit of the German Luftwaffe composed mainly of Estonians. At the end of the war he tried to escape to Sweden from the unit, which had retreated to Germany, but when the engine of his plane failed he was captured by US forces. After being released from captivity, he emigrated to France and was repatriated to the Estonian SSR from there in 1945. In 1950 he graduated as a sculptor from the Tallinn State Applied Art Institute.

== Career ==
After graduating in 1950, Reitel began teaching sculpture at the Tallinn Architectural and Construction College and the Tallinn Pioneers Palace. However, in December of the same year, he was arrested on charges of fighting on the wrong side. After years in prison and internment in the Vorkuta gulag, he was released in 1955. Reitel was then able to resume his work as the head of the sculpture group at the Tallinn Pioneers Palace. His students included the sculptors Hille Palm, Jaak Soans, Tiiu Kirsipuu, Hannes Starkopf, Vergo Vernik, and Al Paldrok, the architect Rein Luup, the furniture designer Toomas Kõrvits, and the ceramicists Leo Rohlin, Ingrid Allik, and Annika Teder.

== Works ==
As a sculptor, Reitel created free, monumental, and decorative sculpture. The bulk of his work dates to the 1960s and 1970s. He created humorous sculptures with a simplified approach to form and several public memorials, including the following: the Haapsalu memorial to the victims of fascism (1966), the Kristjan Raud monument in Hirvepark in the center of Tallinn (1968 or 1969, designed together with his wife Eha Reitel), the memorial to the mass grave of soldiers that fell during the capture of the Väinatamm causeway in 1944, Leinav ema (The Grieving Mother), also known as Muhu ema (The Mother of Muhu, with Eha Reitel) on the island of Muhu (1972), and Kaali mees (The Man of Kaali, with Eha Reitel) on Saaremaa (1989).

As a former fighter pilot, the theme of fallen fellow pilots remained close to his heart. Thus, the monument erected in 1997 at Utti Air Base in Finland to those that died in the Finnish Air Force, including Estonian pilots, and the monument Viimane lend (Last Flight) unveiled at Ämari Air Base in 2004 and dedicated to all fallen Estonian airmen, occupy an important place in his late work.

== Family ==
Kalju Reitel was married three times: to Helvi Johannson (later Mei, 1918–2005), Silvia Taalmann (later Kromanov, 1926–1990), and Eha Thoren (1922–2005). He was the father of the musician Lea Gabral and the art historian Sirje Helme, and the grandfather of the literary scholar Maarja Vaino and the politician Martin Helme.
