= Martin Helme =

Estonian politician (born 1976)

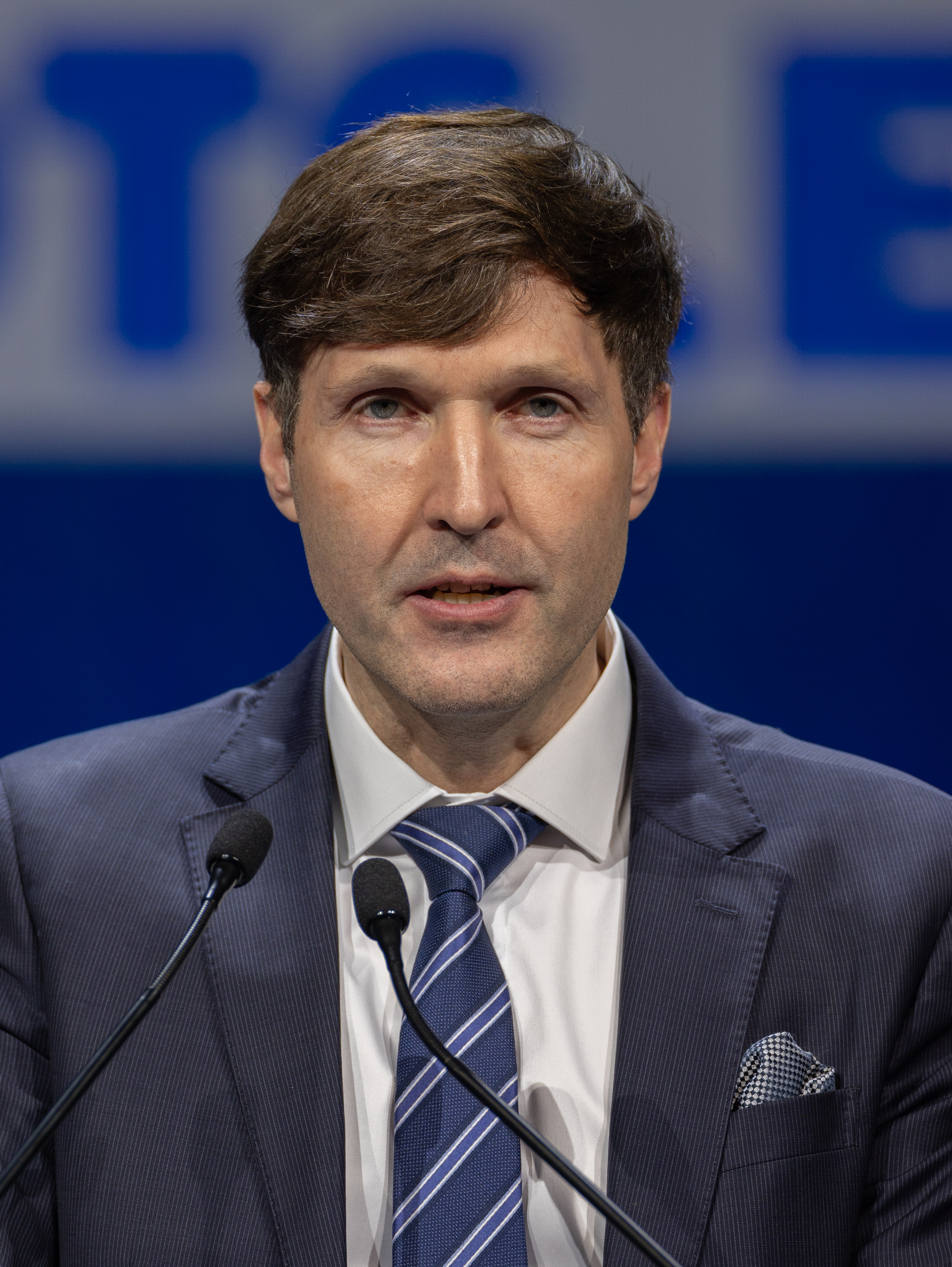
- Helme in 2025

Minister of Finance
- In office 29 April 2019 – 26 January 2021
- Prime Minister: Jüri Ratas
- Preceded by: Toomas Tõniste
- Succeeded by: Keit Pentus-Rosimannus

Leader of the Conservative People's Party
- Incumbent
- Assumed office 4 July 2020
- Preceded by: Mart Helme

Personal details
- Born: 24 April 1976 (age 50) Tallinn, then part of Estonian SSR, Soviet Union
- Party: EKRE
- Relations: Maarja Vaino (sister); Peeter Helme (cousin); Rein Helme (uncle); Kalju Reitel (grandfather)
- Parents: Mart Helme (father); Sirje Helme (mother)
- Education: University of Tartu

Martin Helme (born 24 April 1976) is an Estonian politician and current leader of the Conservative People's Party (EKRE). From 2019 to 2021 he was the country's Minister of Finance.

== Political views ==
Helme's views have been described as eurosceptic and populist. As one of the key figures in EKRE, Martin Helme advocates for national conservatism. He has been an opponent of Estonia's membership of the European Union and the use of the euro as the country's currency. He has claimed that immigration is endangering the sovereignty of European states, including Estonia. Helme has been a vocal critic of the EU's Migration Pact.

Helme, then a board member of EKRE, caused controversy in 2013 for his views on immigration. During a TV interview about riots in socially segregated suburbs in Sweden, he said that "Estonia shouldn't allow things to go as far as in England, France and Sweden. Our immigration policy should have one simple rule: if (they're) black, show the door. As simple as that. We shouldn't allow this problem to emerge in the first place". The Estonian translation of "if it's black, show the door" rhymed as "Kui on must, näita ust" ([kuj ɔn must næjtɑ ust]); it gained widespread notoriety and became one of the main slogans connected to EKRE. In March 2019, Helme defended himself by saying that he had made the comments in 2013 before he was a politician, but nonetheless refused to condemn or retract them, stating that he would always stand against mass immigration.

In the area of civil rights, Helme has campaigned against the passing of the Cohabitation Act in Estonia, which entitled same-sex couples to register as civil partners. He later campaigned to repeal the act.

In November 2020, while in the role of the Minister of Finance, Martin Helme claimed in a radio show he has no doubt that the 2020 US elections were falsified and that "If Trump is taken down, the US Constitution will no longer be in effect." The comments resulted in a political crisis that ended with the resignation of Jüri Ratas's entire second cabinet, including Helme himself.

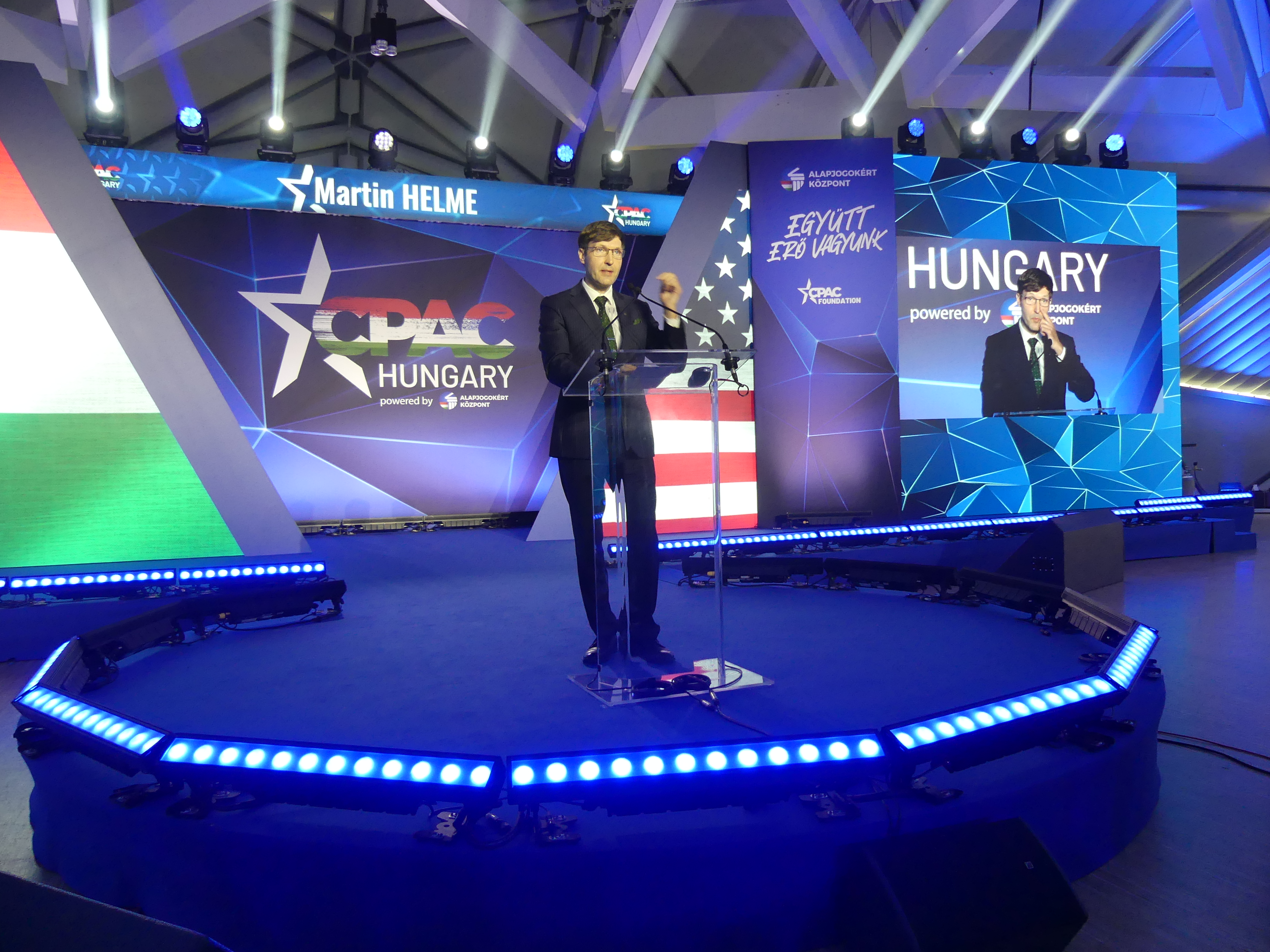
Martin Helme – CPAC Hungary 2023
