= Riidaku =

Village in Estonia

Coordinates: 58°57′N 24°34′E

- Village
- Interactive map of Riidaku
- Country: Estonia
- County: Rapla County
- Parish: Märjamaa Parish
- Time zone: UTC+2 (EET)
  - Summer (DST): UTC+3 (EEST)

Riidaku (German: Ridaka) is a village in Märjamaa Parish, Rapla County in northwestern Estonia. Between 1991 and 2017 (until the administrative reform of Estonian municipalities) the village was located in Raikküla Parish.

== Notable people ==
Notable people that were born in Riidaku include the following:

- Johannes Üksi (1891–1937), writer and actor
