= Aapo Perko =

Finnish former shot putter (1924–2021)

Aapo Kustaa Perko (20 December 1924 – 13 December 2021) was a Finnish shot putter who competed in the 1952 Summer Olympics. Perko died on 13 December 2021, at the age of 97.
