= Aapo Inkinen =

Finnish politician

Abraham (Aapo) Inkinen (24 September 1898, Kuolemajärvi - 23 January 1960) was a Finnish farmer and politician. He was a member of the Parliament of Finland from 1939 to 1948, representing the Agrarian League.
