= Udo-Nestor Ivask =

Estonian artist (1878–1922)

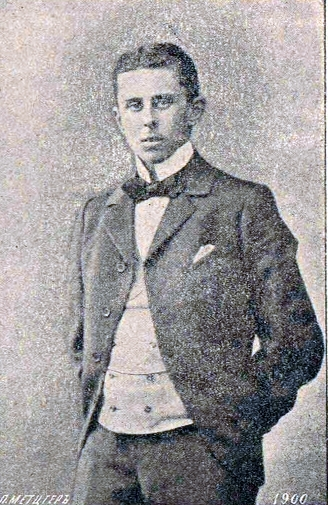
- Born: December 20, 1878; Loodi, Estonia
- Died: May 15, 1922 (aged 43); Tartu, Estonia
- Education: Moscow Archaeological Institute
- Occupation: Artist

Udo-Nestor Ivask (December 20, 1878 – May 15, 1922) was an Estonian bibliophile, book historian, and bookplate artist.

== Early years and education ==
Udo-Nestor Ivask was born at Loodi Manor, the son of Georg Ivask (or Iwask, 1831–1900) and Elisabeth Wilhelmine Ivask (née Brempel, 1853–1922). After graduating from high school, Ivask went to Moscow, where he studied at the painting studio of Konstantin Korovin. He wanted to study art, but he was not accepted at the Moscow School of Painting, Sculpture and Architecture due to his age. He graduated as an archivist from the Moscow Archaeological Institute in 1910.

== Career ==
Ivask chose to specialize in bibliography instead of art, and he was fascinated by bookplates. In addition, he designed title pages, headers, book covers, and vignettes. Ivask's works were printed from 1905 to 1918. Thirty-five bookplates are known to have been created by Ivask.

He founded the Moscow Bookplate Society (Russian: Московское общество любителей книжных знаков) in 1905. He contributed to the creation of the Russian Book Chamber, edited a magazine, and was the head of the department of rare publications at the Rumyantsev Museum and a member of the bibliographic commission of the State Publishing House.

Ivask died of tuberculosis in Tartu in 1922.
