= Aapo Pukk =

Estonian painter

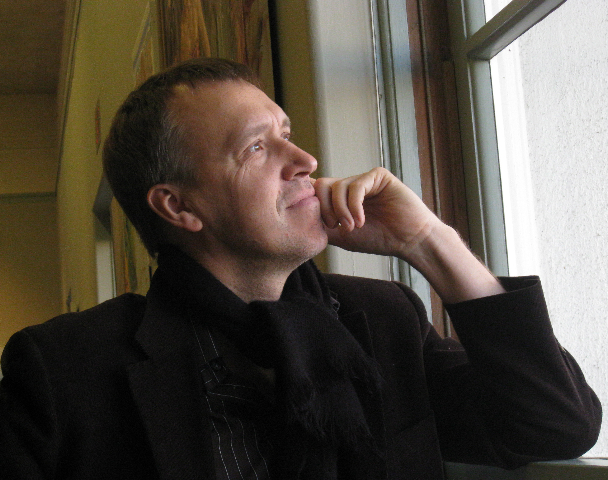
Aapo Pukk

Aapo Pukk (born 3 October 1962) is an Estonian artist. He is mainly known by his portraits and posters.

Pukk was born in Tartu. He graduated from Estonian Art Academy in 1980.

Pukk has painted a wide range of well-known Estonians active in various fields of culture to politicians. He is a member of Estonian Artists´ Association, Association of Estonian Printmakers, Portrait Society of America – PSOA and Art Society of California.

== Gallery ==
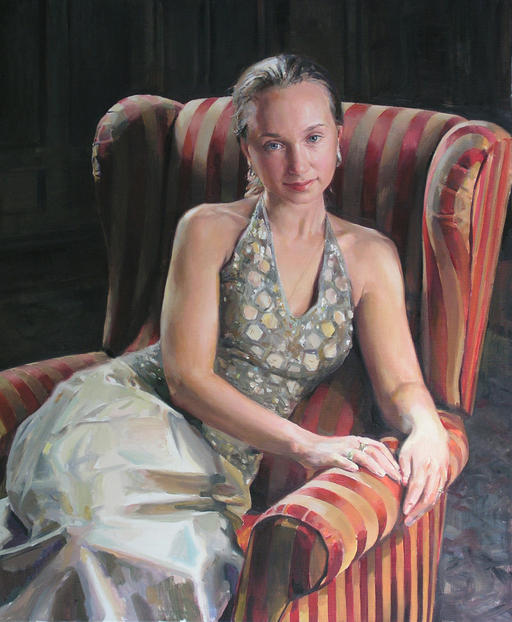
Estonian: Natalja sigarimajas. 2003

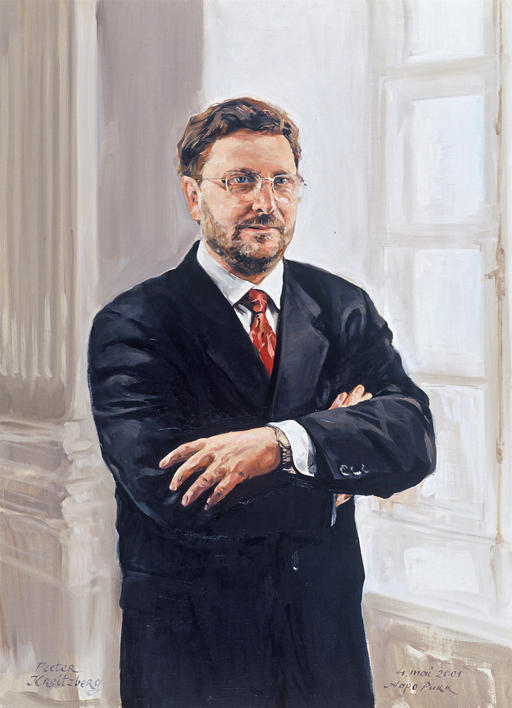
Peeter Kreitzberg. 2002

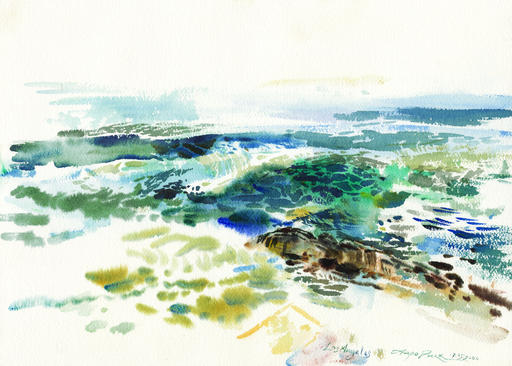
Los Angeles. 2002

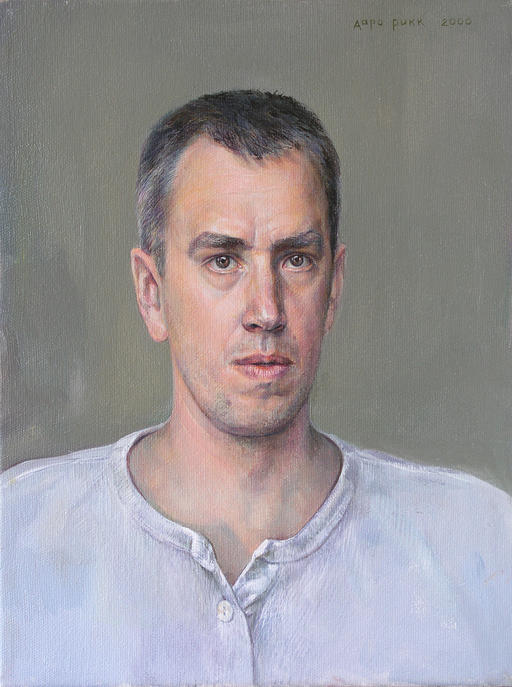
Self-portrait in white shirt. 2001

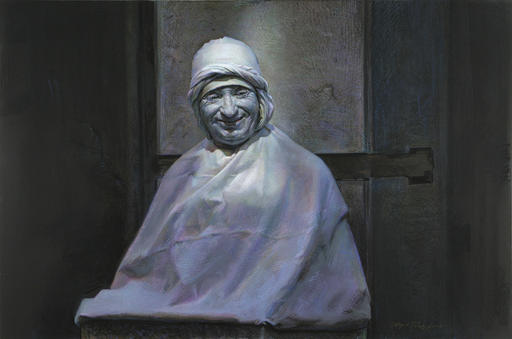
A Man from Venice. 2001

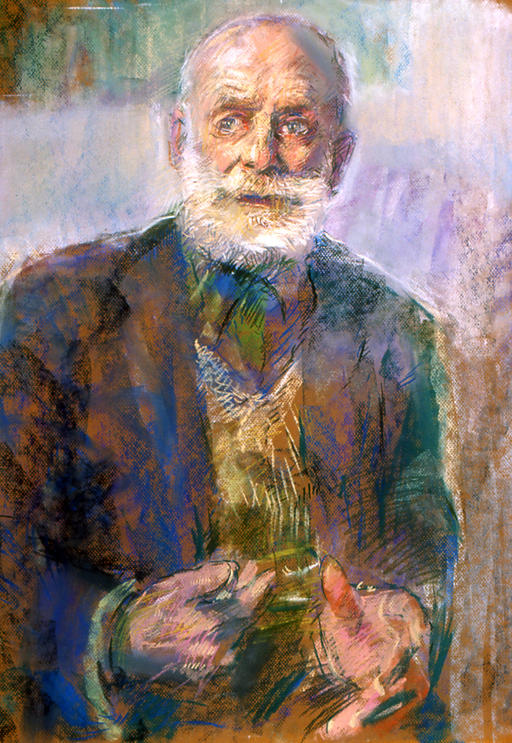
Estonian: Kõnelev vanamees. 2002

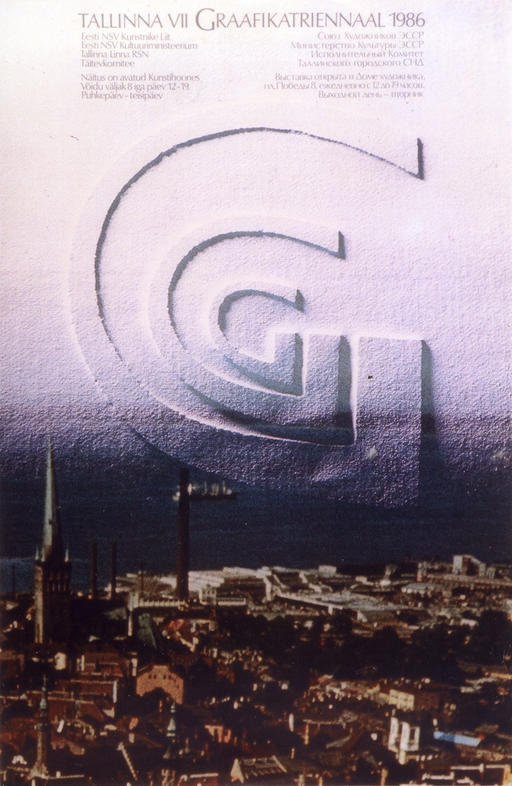
VII Graphics Triennal in Tallinn. 2002

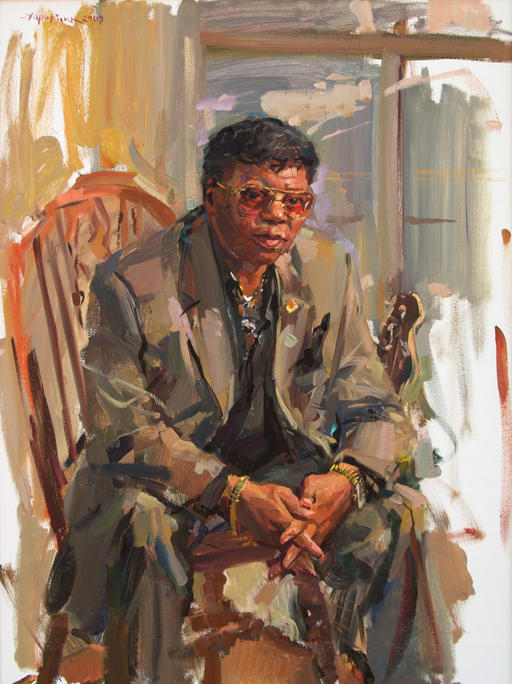
Lawrence McCuest. 2010

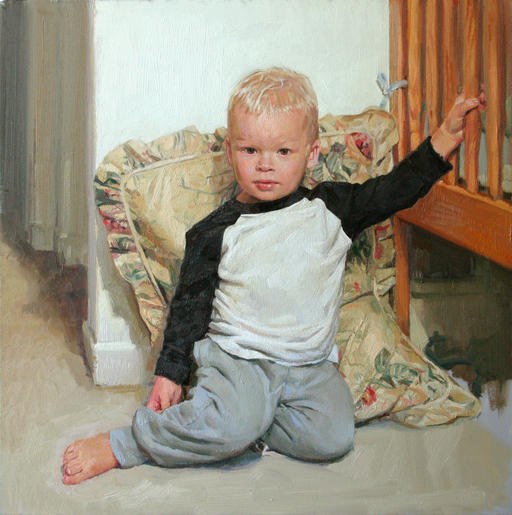
Aaron. 2011

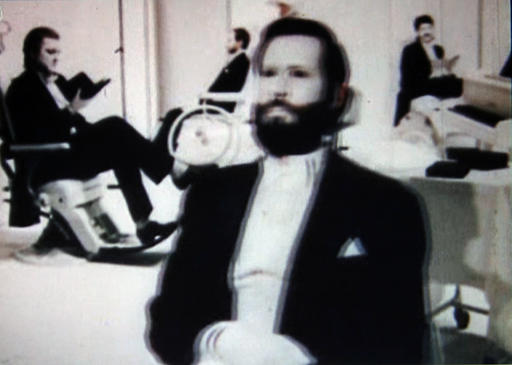
Estonian: Pingu keel. 1987

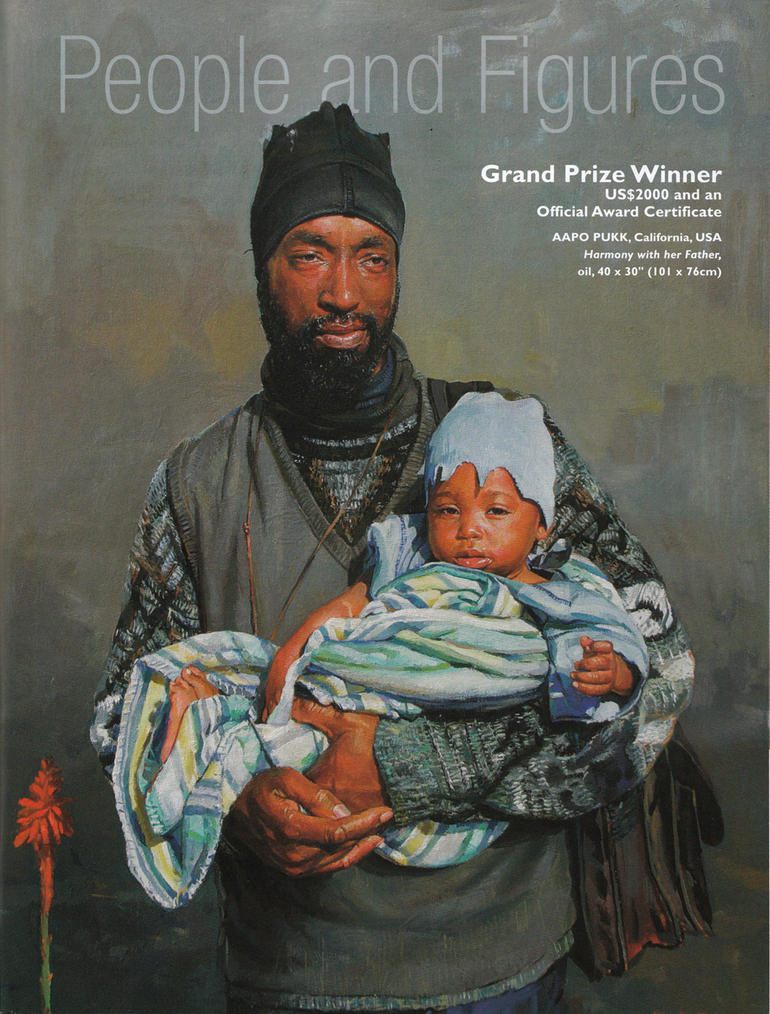
Estonian: Harmonay oma isaga. 2010/2011

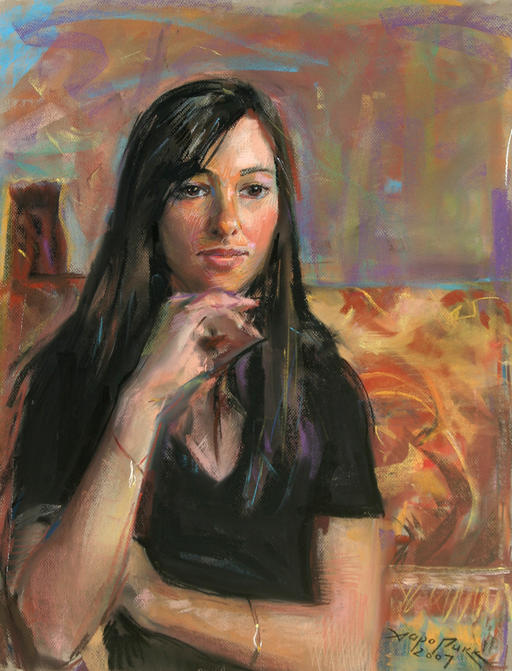
Kelly. 2009

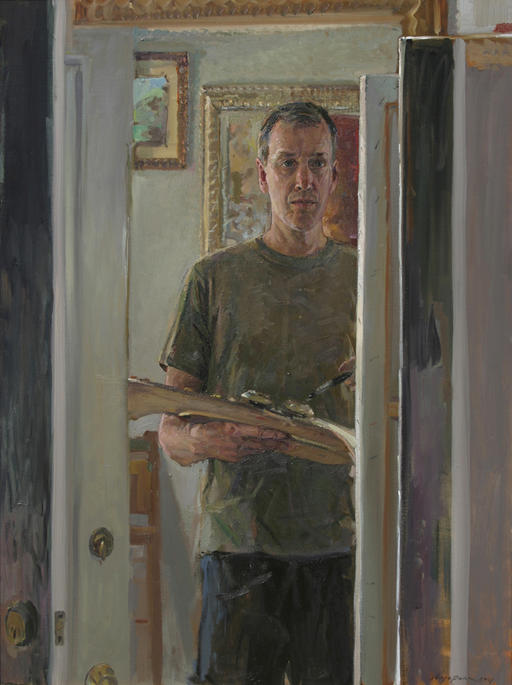
Self-portrait. 2008

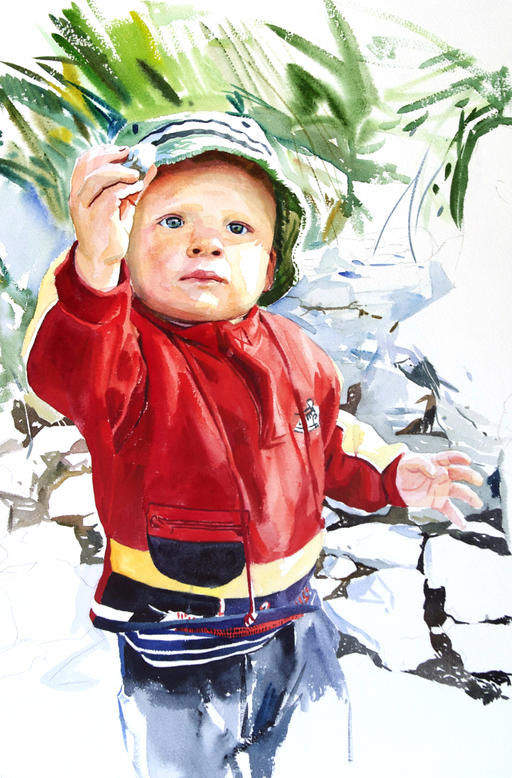
Aaron. 2008

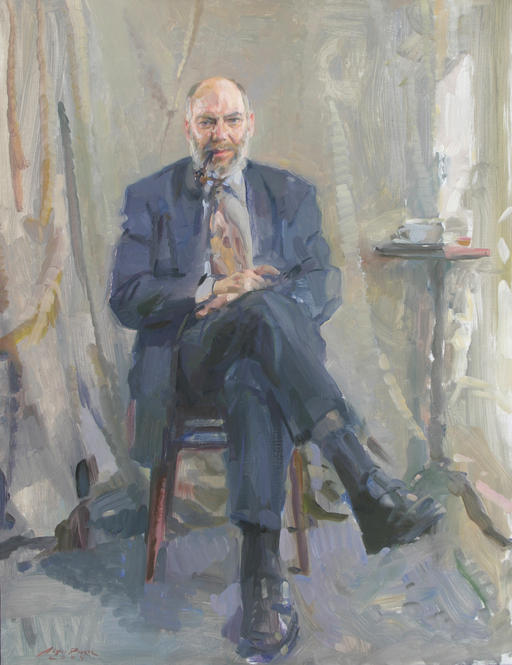
Matti Milius. 2008
