= Peeter Helme =

Estonian writer, journalist, and literary critic

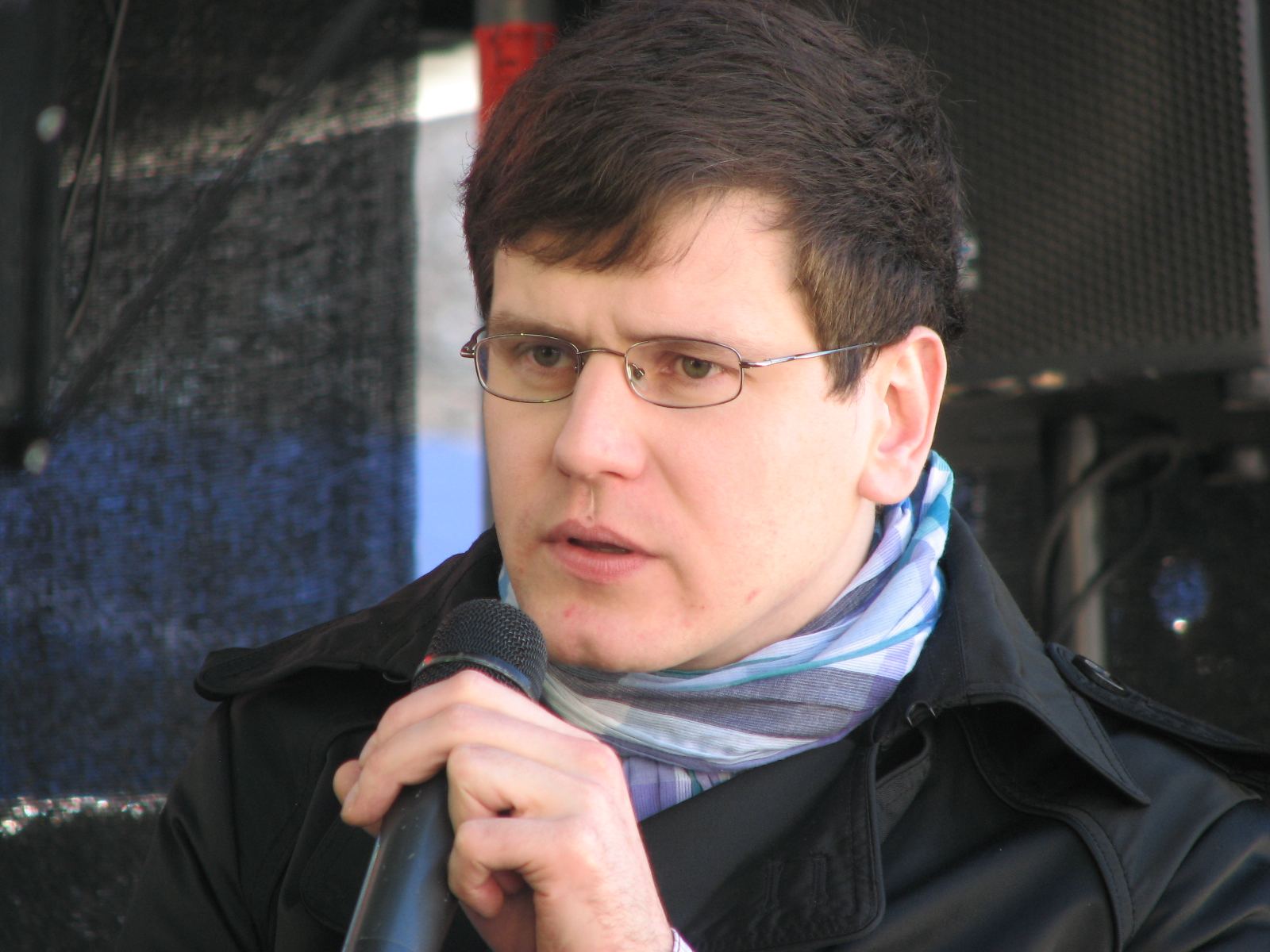
- Helme in 2011
- Born: 6 September 1978 (age 48); Tallinn, then part of Estonian SSR, Soviet Union
- Occupation: Writer
- Relatives: Mart Helme (uncle); Martin Helme (cousin)

Peeter Helme (born 6 September 1978) is an Estonian writer, journalist, and literary critic.

Helme was born in Tallinn. Since 2014, he has been the literature editor for Vikerraadio. In 2020 he was convicted of attempted sexual enticement of minor.

He is the nephew of politician Mart Helme and first cousin of politician Martin Helme.

== Selected works ==
- novel Puudutus, 2007. ISBN 978-9985-9752-8-2.
- short story Lihtne, 2008
- novel September, 2009
- short story Laps, 2010
- novel Varastatud aja lõpus, 2011
- horror story Saemehe töö, 2013
- novel Tuleviku mäletajad. Sofia, 2013
- short story Pringlikütid Vabaduse väljakul, 2014
- short novel Sügaval läänes, 2015
