= Johannes Üksi =

Estonian writer (1891–1937)

- Born: December 14, 1891; Riidaku, Estonia
- Died: August 10, 1937 (aged 45); Tallinn, Estonia
- Resting place: Iru, Tallinn
- Occupations: Writer and actor

Johannes Voldemar Üksi (December 14, 1891 – August 10, 1937) was an Estonian writer and actor.

== Early life ==
Johannes Üksi was born in Riidaku, the son of Mart Üksi (1861–1908) and Emilie Elisabeth Üksi (née Treu; 1863–?).

== Career ==
From 1913 to 1918, Üksi worked as a messenger boy and an actor. During the First World War, he was the commander of Toompea Castle in 1918. The German occupation authorities sentenced him to death for hiding weapons, but the sentence was commuted to forced labor.

As a writer, Üksi's main work is a collection of visionary prose pieces that fluctuates between delirium and spiritualism, Kummalised novellid. I (Strange Short Stories I; 1923). His memoir Surma! (Death!; 1918) contains biographical material.

Üksi died of esophageal cancer in Tallinn in 1937. He was buried in Iru.

== Works ==
- 1914: Nõiakeerus (The Witch's Tale). Tartu: Postimees
- 1916: Poola weri: Operett 3 waatuses: Laulude sõnad (Polish Blood: An Operetta in 3 Acts: Lyrics of Songs; translator). Tallinn: V. Ehrenpreis
- 1918: Siidipüksid: naljamäng lastele kolmes vaatuses (Silk Trousers: A Farce for Children in Three Acts). Tallinn: Eestimaa Kooliõp. Vast. Abiandm. Seltsi raamatukauplus
- 1918: Surma!: mälestused enamlaste ja sakslaste valitsuse ajast (Death!: Memories of the Soviet and German Government). Tallinn: Eestimaa Kooliõpetajate Vast. Abiandm. Seltsi raamatukauplus
- 1922: Kolm kosilast (Armastuse kiri): naljamäng 1 vaatuses (Three Suitors (A Love Letter): A Play in One Act; translator). Tallinn: T. Mutsu
- 1923: Kummalised novellid. I (Strange Short Stories I). Tallinn: Tallinna Eesti Kirjastus-Ühisus
- 1924: Wene keisrikoja saladused: näidend: (kolm waatust). Esimene osa (Secrets of the Russian Imperial Court: A Play: (Three Acts). Part One). Tallinn: Thalia
- 1925: Wene keisrikoja saladused: näidend: (kolm waatust). Teine osa (Secrets of the Russian Imperial Court: A Play: (Three Acts). Part Two). Tallinn: Thalia
- 192?: Amori tembud: J. Üksi traagikomöödia (Cupid's Tricks: A Tragicomedy by J. Üksi). Tallinn: T. Mutsu
- 19??: Kawalpää / J. Üksi jutustus (Slyboots: A Story by J. Üksi)
- 19??: Nurjaläinud õnnestusekatse / J. Üksi jõulu-jutt (A Failed Attempt at Success. A Christmas Story by J. Üksi)
