= Estonian Artists' Association =

Organization based in Estonia

The Estonian Artists Association (abbreviated EAA; Estonian: Eesti Kunstnike Liit) is organization that connects artists in Estonia. The EAA's primary functions are "participating in cultural policymaking and sectoral development activities, protecting the interests of artists, curators, art historians and theorists as well as other art workers, and promoting their working conditions."

In 2025, the president is Maarin Ektermann. He took over from Elin Kard.

Every year the EAA holds the Annual Exhibition of Estonian Artists' Association.

The precursors of the EAA were the Central Association of Estonian Artists (established in 1922), the Estonian Soviet Artists Association (1943), and the Artists Association of the Estonian SSR (1957).

The EAA has several suborganizations, such as the Estonian Painters' Association (Estonian: Eesti Maalikunstnike Liit).
