= List of members of the Supreme Council of the Republic of Estonia, 1990–1992 =

This is a list of members of the twelfth and final legislature of the Supreme Soviet of the Estonian Soviet Socialist Republic, which was the Estonian Soviet Socialist Republic's legislative chamber between 1940 and 1941, and between 1944 and 1992. The session ran from 23 March 1990 to 29 September 1992. Elections were held on 18 March 1990; members were elected using the Single Transferable Vote system. This marked the first time since the formation of the Estonian SSR that the Supreme Soviet's elections were open and freely contestable (and the first democratic elections for the country's legislature since 1932).

On 8 May 1990, the name of the body was changed to the Supreme Council of the Republic of Estonia. The Council acted as de facto parliament of Estonia until VII Riigikogu took office on 30 September 1992. The most important legal act of the council was the Resolution on the national independence of Estonia, adopted on 20 August 1991.

== List of members ==
Source: Jaan Toomla, Valitud ja Valitsenud: Eesti parlamentaarsete ja muude esinduskogude ning valitsuste isikkoosseis aastail 1917–1999 (National Library of Estonia, 1999), pp. 131–132.

| Name | Party | Notes |
| Ülle Aaskivi | SDF | |
| Zijautdin Abdurahmanov | KT | Served until 11.03.1992 |
| Goderdzi Ahaladze | KT | Served until 11.03.1992 |
| Mati Ahven | RSR | |
| Nikolai Aksinin | VÕE | |
| Jaak Allik | SO | |
| Andres Ammas | KD | |
| Viktor Andrejev | V | |
| Lembit Annus | KoF | |
| Tõnu Anton | SDF | |
| Uno Anton | SD | |
| Küllo Arjakas | RKF | |
| Lembit Arro | MRSR | |
| Hillar Eller | SD | |
| Kaljo Ellik | RSR | |
| Ignar Fjuk | RKF | |
| Pavel Grigorjev | V | |
| Aleksandr Gussev | KoF | |
| Illar Hallaste | KD | |
| Liia Hänni | EMKE | |
| Genik Israeljan | KoF | |
| Viktor Jermolajev | KoF | |
| Paavel Jermoškin | V | |
| Jüri Jevstignejev | VÕE | |
| Arvo Junti | RKF | |
| Jaak Jõerüüt | LDF | |
| Rein Järlik | RKF, RSR | |
| Ants Järvesaar | SD | |
| Villu Jürjo | KD | |
| Hillar Kalda | RKF | |
| Lembit Kaljuvee | RKF | Left office on 15.01.1991 |
| Teet Kallas | LDF | |
| Kaido Kama | | |
| Peet Kask | RKF | |
| Johannes Kass | RSR | |
| Kalju Koha | EMKE | |
| Valeri Kois | SD | |
| Mai Kolossova | RKF | |
| Jüri Kork | MRSR | |
| Toomas Kork | SD | |
| Heino Kostabi | MRSR | |
| Jevgeni Kotšegarov | KT | Served until 11.03.1992 |
| Vladimir Kuznetsov | V | |
| Ahti Kõo | SD | |
| Tiit Käbin | LDF | |
| Ants Käärma | SD | |
| Mart Laar | KD | |
| Aleksandr Labassov | KT | |
| Marju Lauristin | SDF | |
| Vladimir Lebedev | VÕE | |
| Enn Leisson | RKF, - | |
| Jüri Liim | RSR | |
| Jaan Lippmaa | SDF | |
| Peeter Lutt | SD | |
| Alar Maarend | SD | |
| Tiit Made | | |
| Mart Madissoon | SD | |
| Vladimir Makovski | KoF | |
| Vitali Menšikov | V | |
| Tõnis Mets | MRSR | |
| Aavo Mölder | SD | |
| Anatoli Novohatski | KoF | |
| Ülo Nugis | | |
| Ants Paju | RSR | |
| Pavel Panfilov | VÕE | |
| Eldur Parder | EMKE | |
| Heldur Peterson | MRSR | |
| Sergei Petinov | VÕE | |
| Vello Pohla | RSR | |
| Andrei Prii | KD | |
| Priidu Priks | SDF | |
| Jüri E. Põld | LDF | |
| Enn Põldroos | LDF | |
| Ivar Raig | EMKE | |
| Koit Raud | RKF | |
| Jüri Reinson | EMKE | |
| Andrus Ristkok | RKF | |
| Jüri Rätsep | RKF | |
| Arnold Rüütel | | |
| Tõnu Saarman | MRSR | |
| Edgar Savisaar | | |
| Hanno Schotter | EMKE | |
| Klavdia Sergij | KT | |
| Arvo Sirendi | MRSR | |
| Sergei Sovetnikov | V | |
| Lehte Sööt | | |
| Aldo Tamm | | |
| Rein Tamme | RKF | |
| Andres Tarand | SDF | |
| Juhan Telgmaa | SD | |
| Mikk Titma | SD | Left office in October 1991 |
| Indrek Toome | SD | |
| Enn Tupp | KD | |
| Ain Tähiste | EMKE | |
| Uno Ugandi | SDF | |
| Ülo Uluots | SD | |
| Heinrich Valk | LDF | |
| Ants Veetõusme | SDF | |
| Rein Veidemann | SDF | |
| Helgi Viirelaid | RKF | |
| Sergei Volkov | KT | Served until 11.03.1992 |
| Vaino Väljas | | |
| Nikolai Zahharov | KoF | |
| Nikolai Zolin | V | |
| Aleksei Zõbin | VÕE | |
