= Estonian Restoration of Independence =

20 August 1991 event where Estonia restored full independence

Estonian Restoration of Independence, legally defined as the Restoration of the Republic of Estonia, was proclaimed on 20 August 1991. On that day at 23:02 local time, the Supreme Council of the Republic of Estonia, in agreement with the Estonian Committee (the executive organ of the Congress of Estonia), declared the illegal Soviet occupation and annexation of the country terminated, and proclaimed the full restoration of the independence of Estonia.

== 1990 ==
On 30 March 1990, the Supreme Soviet of the Estonian SSR adopted a resolution on the state status of Estonia. The resolution declared that the Soviet occupation of 17 June 1940 did not de jure interrupt the existence of the Republic of Estonia, the Supreme Soviet declared the state power of the Estonian SSR illegal from the moment of its establishment and proclaimed the start of a transitional period to full de facto independence pending the restoration of the constitutional bodies of state power of the Republic of Estonia. On 8 May the same year, the Supreme Soviet of the ESSR adopted a law invalidating the name "Estonian Soviet Socialist Republic". Also, according to this law, the use of the coat of arms, flag, and anthem of the Estonian SSR as state symbols was terminated and the 1938 Constitution of the independent Republic of Estonia was restored. The name of the Supreme Soviet is thereafter translated as the "Supreme Council". A week later the law on the principles of the interim order of administration of Estonia was adopted, according to which the subordination of public authorities, public administration, court bodies was terminated and the prosecutor's office of the republic to the relevant authorities of the USSR, and they separated from the corresponding system of the USSR. It was announced that relations between the republic and the USSR are now based on the Tartu Peace Treaty, concluded between the Republic of Estonia and the RSFSR on 2 February 1920.

== Independence referendum of 3 March 1991 ==
On 3 March, a referendum was held on the independence of the Republic of Estonia, which was attended by those who lived in Estonia before the Soviet annexation and their descendants, as well as persons who have received the so-called "green cards" of the Congress of Estonia. 77.8% of those who voted supported the idea of restoring independence.

Denmark recognized Estonia's independence on 11 March.

== The 1991 Soviet coup d'état attempt ==
The August Coup or August Putsch took place on 19–22 August 1991 and was an attempt by members of the Soviet Union's government to take control of the country from the Soviet President and General Secretary Mikhail Gorbachev.

== 19 August 1991 ==
As the coup attempt was taking place in Moscow and with that the military and political attention of the Soviet Union otherwise occupied, various republics of the Soviet Union took the opportunity to declare their independence. On the evening of 19 August, delegates from the Supreme Council of the Republic of Estonia and the Estonian Committee started negotiations to confirm the independence of the Republic of Estonia. The main debate was a crucial one: should Estonia declare independence as a new Republic or continue with the juridical continuation of the Republic of Estonia established in 1918 and occupied in 1940.

== 20 August 1991 ==
At 23:02 on the evening of 20 August 1991, during a live broadcast carried out by Estonian Television, the Supreme Council of the Republic of Estonia voted on the confirm of its Restoration of Independence.

DECISION OF THE SUPREME COUNCIL OF THE REPUBLIC OF ESTONIA

On the national independence of Estonia

Based on the continuity of the Republic of Estonia as a subject of international law,

drawing upon the Estonian population’s declaration of intent clearly expressed in the 3 March 1991 referendum to restore the national independence of the Republic of Estonia,

given the 30 March 1990 decision of the Supreme Soviet of the Estonian SSR “on the National Status of Estonia” and the declaration of the Supreme Soviet of the Estonian SSR “on the Cooperation of the Supreme Soviet of the Estonian SSR and the Congress of Estonia,”

taking into account that the coup which has taken place in the Soviet Union poses a serious threat to the democratic processes taking place in Estonia and has rendered impossible the restoration of the national independence of the Republic of Estonia by means of bilateral negotiations with the Soviet Union,

the Supreme Council of the Republic of Estonia has decided:

1. To confirm the national independence of the Republic of Estonia and seek the restoration of diplomatic relations of the Republic of Estonia.

2. To establish the Constitutional Assembly for the development and submission to referendum of the Constitution of Estonia, the composition of which will be shaped by delegation from the highest legislative organ of state power of the Republic of Estonia, the Supreme Council of the Republic of Estonia, and the representative body of the citizenry of Estonia, the Congress of Estonia.

3. To hold parliamentary elections according to the new Constitution of the Republic of Estonia in the year 1992.

Chairman of the Supreme Council of the Republic of Estonia A. RÜÜTEL

Tallinn, 20 August 1991.

Out of the 105 delegates of the Supreme Council 70 were present, 69 voted in favour of the restoration. Two delegates, Klavdia Sergij and Kaido Kama, did not register to vote and walked out before voting began. Those who voted in favour of the restoration were:

- Ülle Aaskivi
- Mati Ahven
- Andres Ammas
- Tõnu Anton
- Uno Anton
- Lembit Arro
- Hillar Eller
- Kaljo Ellik
- Ignar Fjuk
- Illar Hallaste
- Liia Hänni
- Arvo Junti
- Jaak Jõerüüt
- Rein Järlik
- Ants Järvesaar
- Villu Jürjo
- Hillar Kalda
- Teet Kallas
- Peet Kask
- Johannes Kass
- Kalju Koha
- Valeri Kois
- Mai Kolossova
- Jüri Kork
- Toomas Kork
- Heino Kostabi
- Ahti Kõo
- Tiit Käbin
- Ants Käärma
- Mart Laar
- Marju Lauristin
- Enn Leisson
- Jüri Liim
- Jaan Lippmaa
- Alar Maarend
- Tiit Made
- Mart Madissoon
- Tõnis Mets
- Aavo Mölder
- Ülo Nugis
- Ants Paju
- Eldur Parder
- Heldur Peterson
- Andrei Prii
- Priidu Priks
- Jüri E. Põld
- Enn Põldroos
- Koit Raud
- Jüri Reinson
- Andrus Ristkok
- Jüri Rätsep
- Arnold Rüütel
- Tõnu Saarman
- Edgar Savisaar
- Hanno Schotter
- Lehte Sööt
- Aldo Tamm
- Rein Tamme
- Andres Tarand
- Indrek Toome
- Enn Tupp
- Ain Tähiste
- Uno Ugandi
- Ülo Uluots
- Heinrich Valk
- Ants Veetõusme
- Rein Veidemann
- Helgi Viirelaid
- Vaino Väljas

== 21 August 1991 ==
On the morning of 21 August 1991, Soviet paratroopers were taking charge of the Tallinn's TV tower, while the television broadcast was cut off for a while, the radio signal was strong as a handful of Estonian Defence League (the unified paramilitary armed forces of Estonia) members barricaded the entry into signal rooms. By the afternoon of the same day it was clear that the coup in Moscow had failed and the paratroopers released the tower and left Estonia.

== 20 August Club ==
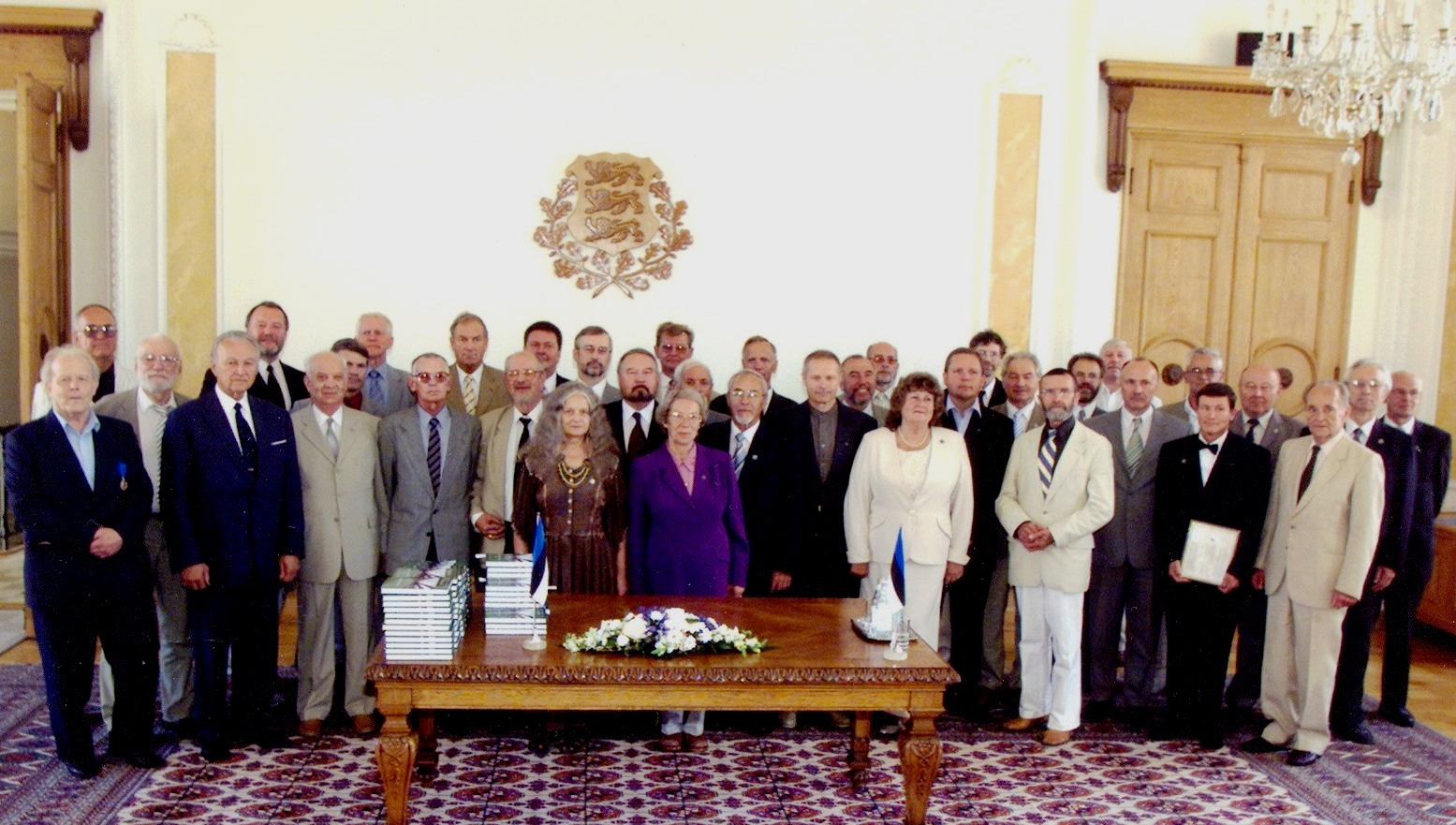
Members of 20 August Club in 2005

In 1994, the 20 August Club was established. The club's members are those politicians who voted in favour of the restoration on 20 August 1991.

== See also ==
- On the Restoration of Independence of the Republic of Latvia – A similar Act in the Latvian SSR
- Act of the Re-Establishment of the State of Lithuania – A similar Act in the Lithuanian SSR
- State continuity of the Baltic states
- Dissolution of the Soviet Union
