= Constitutional Assembly of Estonia =

Representative body of Estonia

Constitutional Assembly of Estonia (Estonian: Põhiseaduse Assamblee) was the representative body whose goal was to create new Constitution of the Republic of Estonia. The assembly was composed on 20 August 1991 by the members from Committee of Estonia and Supreme Council of the Republic of Estonia. The assembly functioned until 10 April 1992.

== Members ==
Members were as follows:

- Ülle Aaskivi
- Jüri Adams
- Viktor Andrejev
- Tõnu Anton
- Rein Arjukese
- Hillar Eller
- Sirje Endre
- Ants Erm
- Ignar Fjuk
- Illar Hallaste
- Liia Hänni
- Pavel Jermoškin
- Rein Järlik
- Kalle Jürgenson
- Ain Kaalep
- Kaido Kama
- Peet Kask
- Tunne Kelam
- Kalju Koha
- Valeri Kois
- Toomas Kork
- Viktor Korrovits
- Tiit Käbin
- Mart Laar
- Marju Lauristin
- Vladimir Lebedev
- Lennart Meri
- Linnart Mäll
- Viktor Niitsoo
- Sergei Petinov
- Eve Pärnaste
- Ivar Raig
- Hain Rebas
- Jüri Reinson
- Vardo Rumessen
- Hando Runnel
- Rein Ruutsoo
- Jüri Rätsep
- Arnold Rüütel
- Vello Saatpalu
- Vello Salum
- Ülo Seppa
- Arvo Sirendi
- Sergei Sovetnikov
- Lehte Sööt (Hainsalu)
- Nikolai Zahharov
- Rein Taagepera
- Juhan Kristjan Talve
- Ülo Uluots
- Lauri Vahtre
