= Mati Ahven =

Estonian politician and engineer

- Born: 3 February 1943; Rannu, Generalbezirk Estland
- Died: 12 February 2022 (age 79)
- Education: Põltsamaa Secondary School; Estonian University of Life Sciences

Mati Ahven (3 February 1943 – 12 February 2022) born in Rannu, Generalbezirk Estland, was an engineer and mechanic who was a member of the Supreme Council of the Republic of Estonia and a voter for the Estonian restoration of Independence.

He graduated from Põltsamaa Secondary School in 1961 and from the Faculty of Mechanization of Agriculture at the Estonian University of Life Sciences in 1969.

He worked as an engineer and production manager in Põltsamaa from 1969 to 1990.

In 1989, he was elected a member of the city council of Põltsamaa. From 1990 to 1992, he was a member of the Supreme Council of the Republic of Estonia, being a member of the Social Affairs Committee; He also participated in the work of the Land Use Group. On 20 August 1991, he voted for the restoration of Estonia's independence.

On 12 February 2022, Ahven passed away at the age of 79.

== Awards ==
- 2002: 5th class of the Order of the National Coat of Arms (received 23 February 2002)
- 2006: 3rd class of the Order of the National Coat of Arms (received 23 February 2006)
