= Anton (surname) =

Anton or Antón is a surname. Notable people with the surname include:

- Abel Antón (born 1962), Spanish long-distance runner
- Adina Anton (born 1984), Romanian long jumper
- Anton Anton (born 1949), Romanian engineer and politician
- Arsenio Martínez-Campos y Antón (1831–1900), Spanish soldier and politician who restored the Bourbon dynasty
- Carl Anton (1722–?), Curonian writer
- Christopher Anton, American singer and songwriter
- Craig Anton (born 1962), American actor and comedian
- Fred Anton (1934–2017), American businessman and political figure
- Gabriel Anton (1858–1933), Austrian neurologist and psychiatrist
- Hermann Eduard Anton (1794–1872), German malacologist
- Igor Antón (born 1983), Basque road race bicyclist
- Karl Anton (1898–1979), German film director, screenwriter and producer
- Paul Anton (born 1991), Romanian footballer
- Rico Anton (born 1977), German politician
- Susan Anton (born 1950), American actress and singer
- Tõnu Anton (born 1953), Estonian politician
- Uno Anton (1942–2012), Estonian politician

== See also ==
- Anton (disambiguation)
- Anton (given name)
- Antona (name)
- Antono (name)
- Antos (name)
- Antoun
- Kareen Antonn
