= Johannes Kass =

Estonian politician (born 1949)

Johannes Kass (born 24 May 1949, Tallinn) is an Estonian politician, most notable for voting for the Estonian restoration of Independence in his function of a member of the Supreme Soviet of Estonia.

Kass' parents were farmers who were arrested in 1948, and he was born in the Tallinn Battery and grew up in several Russian children's homes. After his parents received amnesty in 1956, he returned to Estonia, and in 1966 he graduated from the Pärnu 8. 8-class school (in Raeküla), and in 1970 as a radio technician from Tallinn Polytechnic School.

He worked in the Estonian Radio Center from 1970 to 1978 and from 1978 to 1989, in the fishery "Pärnu Kalur" as a technician in the field of radio navigation equipment and from 1989 to 90 in Matek OÜ.

From 1990 to 1992, Kass was a member of the Supreme Soviet (from 1990 "Supreme Council") of Estonia, where he was a member of the National Defense Committee. On 20 August 1991, he voted for the restoration of Estonia's independence. He was a member of the Pärnu County branch of the Popular Front of Estonia and the Central Committee. He was also the founder and vice chairman of the Pärnu branch of the Estonian Citizens' Committees, and was also a member of the Congress of Estonia and vice-chairman of the Committee on Combating and Disclosure of Corruption, and a coordinator of the Geneva-49 Pärnu movement. In addition, he was a member of Pärnu City Council from 1989 to 1993.

He was a member of the Estonian Centre Party from 2000 to 2010. In the ranks of the party, he was a candidate to be a part of Pärnu City Council in 2002 and 2005, but was only elected as an alternate member from 2002 to 2009.

From 1992, he has been a member of the Pärnu County Defense League.

== Awards ==
- 2002: 5th Class of the Estonian Order of the National Coat of Arms (received 23 February 2002)
- 2006: 3rd Class of the Estonian Order of the National Coat of Arms (received 23 February 2006)
