= Kaljo Ellik =

Estonian politician (1948–2017)

Kaljo Ellik (9 May 1948 in Siiksaare – 27 March 2017) was an Estonian politician who voted for the Estonian restoration of Independence.

Ellik graduated in 1963 from Kingisepp 1st Secondary School, in 1968 from Räpina Horticultural Engineering School, and in 1975 from the Estonian University of Life Sciences. In addition, he has studied social psychology at the Tartu Fine Arts Courses and the University of Tartu.

He served as senior agronomist inspectorate in the Kingisepp District Seed Inspectorate from 1969 to 1979 and from 1978 to 1990 as vice chairman of the Executive Committee of the Council of People's Deputies of Kingisepp. In 1990, he was Deputy Mayor of Kuressaare.

From 1990 to 1992, he was a member of the Supreme Council of the Republic of Estonia, and on 20 August 1991 he voted in favor of the restoration of Estonia's independence. He was also an ambassador to the Congress of Estonia. On 18 September 1991, he became a member of the Estonian Centre Party.

== Awards ==
- 5th Class of the Estonian Order of the National Coat of Arms (received 23 February 2002)
- 3rd Class of the Estonian Order of the National Coat of Arms (received 23 February 2006)
- 2008: Order of the City of Kuressaare
