= Ahti Kõo =

Estonian lawyer, writer, and politician

Mayor of Pärnu
- In office 28 April 2005 – 1 November 2005
- Preceded by: Väino Hallikmägi
- Succeeded by: Mart Viisitamm

Personal details
- Born: 29 March 1952 (age 74) Pühajärve, then part of Estonian SSR, Soviet Union
- Party: Res Publica Party (2002–2007); Reform Party (2007–2010)
- Education: University of Tartu

Ahti Kõo (born 29 March 1952) is an Estonian lawyer, writer and former politician. He is a member of the August 20 Club which unites the members of Supreme Council of the Republic of Estonia who voted for the restoration of the independence of Estonia.

Kõo graduated from Otepää Secondary School in 1970 and from the Faculty of Law at the University of Tartu in 1975. He then worked as a prosecutor (in the years 1976-1990) in Tartu, Jõgeva and Pärnu. Later, he acted as a sworn advocate.

From 1979 to 1990, Kõo was a member of the Communist Party of Estonia. From 1990 to 1992, he was a member of the Supreme Soviet of the Republic of Estonia, where he voted to restore Estonia's independence. From 1993 to 1996 and from 1999 to 2002, he was the Vice-Chairman of Pärnu City Council, later becoming the mayor of Pärnu briefly in 2005. He later was a city council member again from 2007 to 2010. From 2002 to 2007, he was a part of the Res Publica Party, which later became the Fatherland and Res Publica Union Party. From 2007 to 2010, he was a member of the Reform Party.

== Bibliography ==
- 2010: Oleme seda väärt
- 2012: Salamees
- 2015: Võimukõdi
- 2016: Äraeksinu

== Awards ==
- 2003: 5th Class of the Estonian Order of the National Coat of Arms (received 23 February 2003)
- 2006: 3rd Class of the Estonian Order of the National Coat of Arms (received 23 February 2006)
