= Heino Kostabi =

Estonian politician (1933–2021)

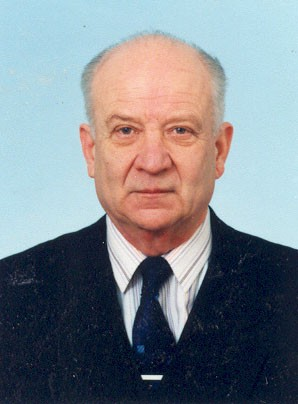
Heino Kostabi

Heino Kostabi (19 May 1933, Petseri, Estonia – 22 March 2021) was an Estonian politician, most notable for voting for the Estonian restoration of Independence.

== Education and early life ==
Kostabi was born into a working-class family. His father, Jaak Richard Kostabi, worked as a carpenter, while his mother, Ella Kostabi (née Oper) was engaged in sewing and handicrafts. He graduated from Pechory Primary School, then in 1952 graduated from high school. In 1957, he graduated as an engineer mechanic in the Faculty of Agricultural Engineering of the Estonian University of Life Sciences (diploma with honors). From 1971 to 1976, he was an aspirant in Pushkin, Saint Petersburg, located in the Northwest Region Institute for Agricultural Engineering, Electrification Design and Technology Research. In 1977, he defended his engineering degree.

== Career ==
From 1957 to 1958, Kostabi was an engineer-controller at Orava MTJ, a manager of automotive industry from 1958 to 1960 at Orava State Farm and chief engineer officer, deputy director, director at Veriora State Farm from 1960 to 1990. From 1990 to 1992, he was a Member of the Supreme Council of the Estonian SSR and the Supreme Council of the Republic of Estonia, the Deputy Chairman of the Land Assembly Group, Chairman of the Group of the Wabariik, and Member of the Presidium of the Supreme Council

== Social and literary activities ==
Kostabi was a member of the 6th session of the Communist Party of Estonia, a member of several constituencies of local governments, and a member of the Congress of Estonia. He has participated in various social professions in the form of trade unions and party organs, judges, folk song-writing, social road inspectors, people's voices, the XXVI Committee of the EELC, the Võru County Council, the EELC Petseri Peter Church and other work and activities.

He was the writer of the book "Kaks otsustavat päeva Toompeal" (1996), compiler of the collection "Omariiklust taastamas" (2001), compiler of the book "Baltimaad hävitatud omariiklust taastamas" (2009), and the updated version of the collection, "Vundamendi taastamine iseseisvale riigile. Dokumente, materjale ja meenutusi Eesti Vabariigi Ülemnõukogu tegevusest aastatel 1990–1992" (2012).

From 1966 to 1990, Kostabi was a member of the Communist Party of Estonia. He was a founding member of the party. He was a passive member of the Social Democratic Party.

== Awards ==
- 2002: 5th Class of the Estonian Order of the National Coat of Arms (received 23 February 2002)
- 2006: 3rd Class of the Estonian Order of the National Coat of Arms (received 23 February 2006)

== Personal life ==
Kostabi was married. He spoke Estonian, Russian, and German. His hobbies included history, beekeeping, music, and cars.
