= Lippmaa =

Family name

Lippmaa is a surname of Estonian origin. Notable people with the surname include:

- Endel Lippmaa (1930–2015), Estonian physicist and politician
- Jaan Lippmaa (1942–2021), Estonian engineer and politician
- Teodor Lippmaa (1892–1943), Estonian botanist
