= Uno Anton =

Estonian politician

Uno Anton (4 April 1942 in Suislepa – 19 April 2012) was an Estonian politician and a voter for the Estonian restoration of Independence.

He was born in Suislepa as the fifth child of six. His father died early and his mother raised their children alone. He studied at Suislepa Primary School and Mustla Secondary School. After graduating from Paide School, he worked as an excavator and at the same time studied in high school. From 1961 to 1963, he worked as an excavator at Viljandi EPT. From 1963 to 1966, he was in the Soviet Army. From 1966 to 1971, he studied agronomy at the Estonian University of Life Sciences.

From 1971 to 1972, he worked as a head of the department at the Vambola collective farm near Soe, while in 1972–73 he was in the Tarvastu collective farm. In 1973, he was appointed as the head of agronomy at Kärstna collective farm, and from 1976 to 1981, he was chairman of Kärstna collective farm. From 1981 to 1990, he worked as the chairman of the Tarvastu collective farm.

Anton was a member of the Estonian Supreme Soviet from 1990 to 1992, as part of an initiative from Viljandi County, along with Ülle Aaskivi, Jaak Allik, and Jüri Rätsep. His candidature was presented by the Holstre Department of Labor of the Paistu collective farm and received 7935 votes. He was a member of the Rural Affairs Committee and the Independent Democrat Group. He voted on August 20, 1991 as one of the 69 members of the Supreme Council for restoration of the independence of the Republic of Estonia.

At the end of the parliamentary mandate, he began working in Tarvastu Forest District in 1992, where he retired in 2000.

Anton was a member of the Tarvastu Village Council and from 1993 to 1996, as well as being the municipality councilor. He was a candidate in the Kärstna Independence Association and received 136 votes.

== Awards ==
- 5th Class of the Estonian Order of the National Coat of Arms (received 10 October 2002)
- 3rd Class of the Estonian Order of the National Coat of Arms (received 6 February 2006)
