= Jüri Kork =

Estonian politician

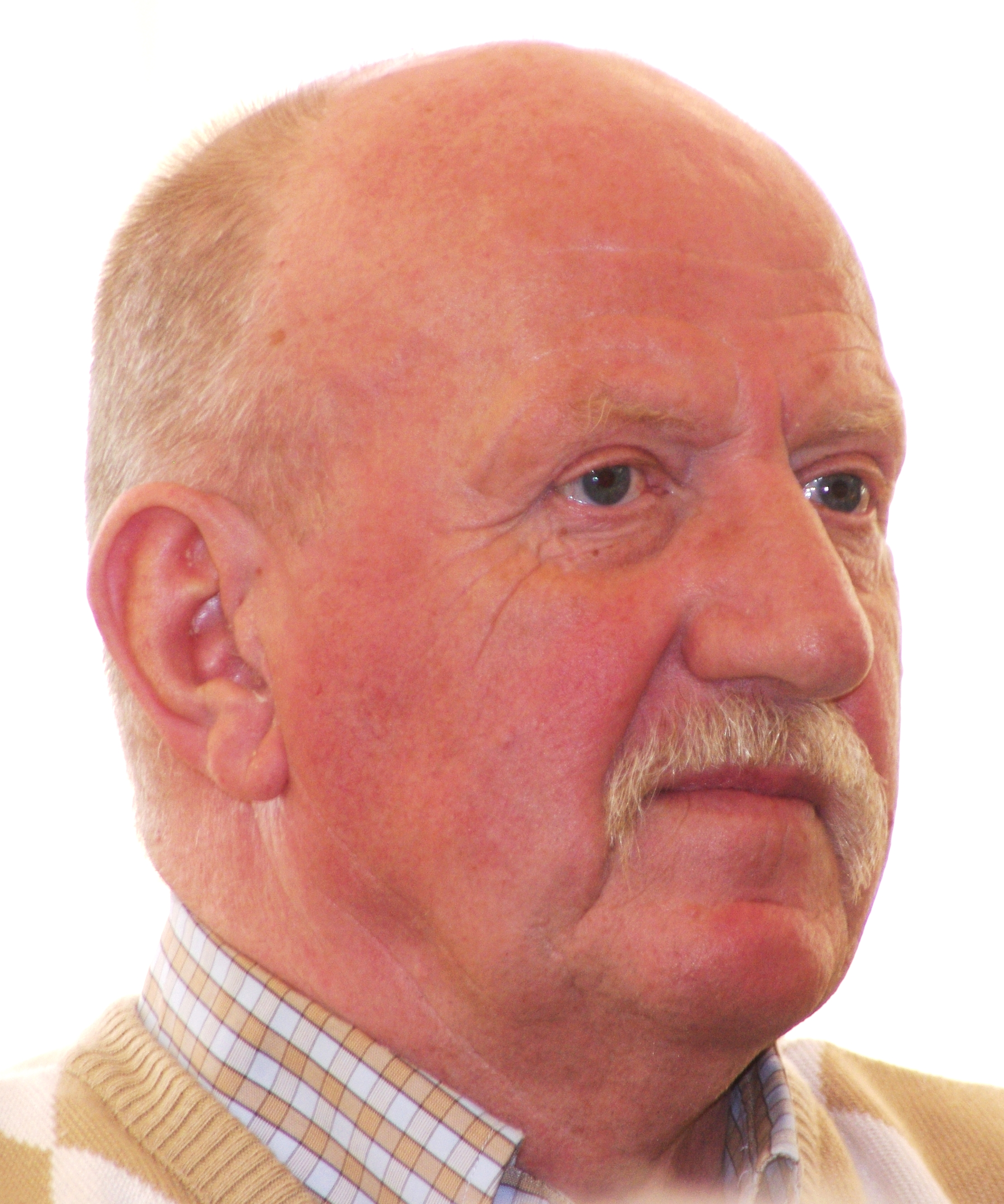
Jüri Kork in 2012

Jüri Kork (born 3 August 1947, Tartu) is an Estonian politician, most notable for voting for the Estonian restoration of Independence.

Kork graduated from Tsirguliina High School in 1966 and the Department of Physical Education from the University of Tartu in 1970.

He worked as a teacher at Põltsamaa High School from 1972 to 1976. From 1976 to 1982, he was the chairman of the Sports Committee of the Jõgeva Raion and, from 1982 to 1990, was the director of Pühajärve Holiday Village.

From 1990 to 1992, Kork was a member of the Supreme Soviet of Estonia and the Congress of Estonia, voting for Estonia's restoration of independence. In the Soviet, he was a member of the Committee on Foreign Affairs, the Family and Social Affairs Committee and later the Administrative Reform Commission. He is a member of the Group of Farmers' Deputies. Kork participated in the founding of the Popular Front of Estonia in Otepää and Valga County. During the occupation of Estonia by the Soviet Union, he was one of the keepers of the secret of the first Estonian flag's hiding place.

== Awards ==
- 2002: 5th Class of the Estonian Order of the National Coat of Arms (received 23 February 2002)
- 2006: 3rd Class of the Estonian Order of the National Coat of Arms (received 23 February 2006)

== Personal life ==
Kork's siblings are doctor and politician Andres Kork, politician and businessman Toomas Kork, and nurse and psychiatrist Anu Kasmel.
