= Mai Kolossova =

Estonian politician

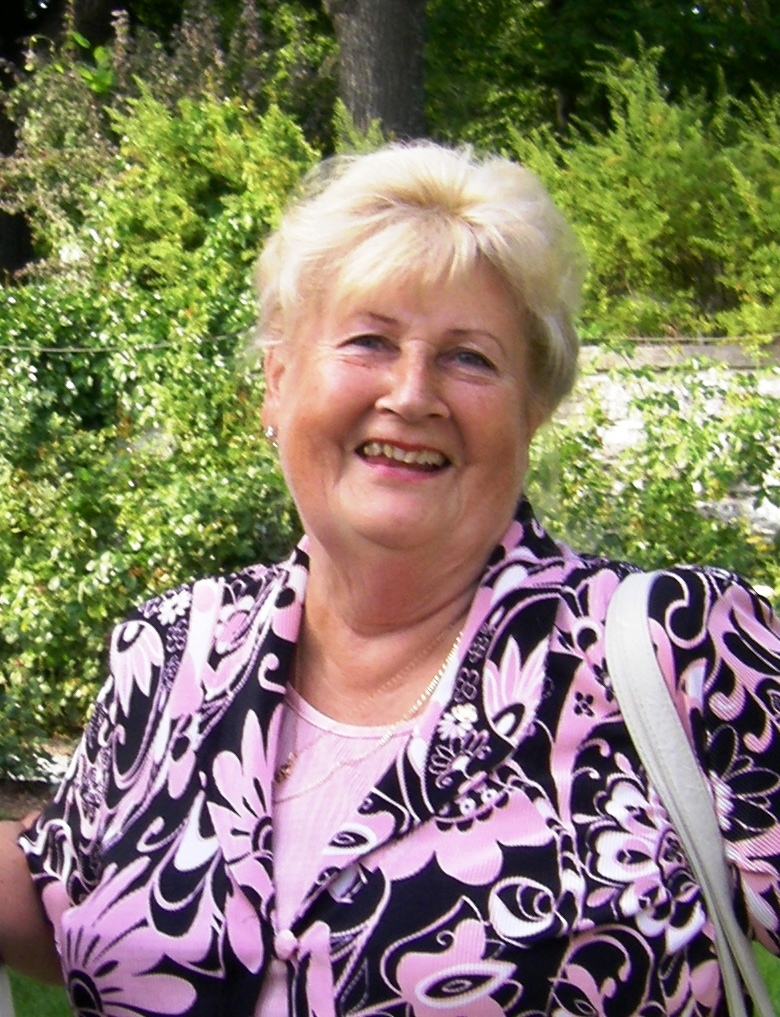
Mai Kolossova in 2011.

Mai Kolossova (née Pärda; born 19 May 1937, Tartu, Estonia) is an Estonian agronomist, pedagogue, party worker and politician, most notable for voting for the Estonian restoration of Independence.

== Biography ==
Mai Pärda was born 19 May 1937, in Tartu.

She graduated from Miina Härma Gymnasium in 1955 and from the Estonian University of Life Sciences in 1960 as an agronomist and studied chemistry and biology at the University of Tartu.

Kolossova worked as an agronomist in Vändra from 1960 to 1963, and was part of the Tori and Pärnu's Agricultural Governments. From 1963 to 1972, she worked as a biology and chemistry teacher in Pärnu. From 1984 to 1990, she was the First Secretary of the Valga Regional Committee of the Communist Party of Estonia.

From 1990 to 1992, she was a member of the Supreme Soviet of Estonia, being a member of the Committee on Social Affairs. She voted for the restoration of Estonia's independence.

== Awards and honors ==
- 2002: 5th Class of the Estonian Order of the National Coat of Arms (received 23 February 2002)
- 2006: 3rd Class of the Estonian Order of the National Coat of Arms (received 23 February 2006)
