= Andrei Prii =

Estonian economist and politician

Member of the Supreme Council of Estonia
- In office 29 March 1990 – 14 September 1992

Personal details
- Born: 5 October 1938 Mäla, Estonia
- Died: 25 December 2022 (aged 84)
- Party: CPSU (1968–1988); EKDL (1990–1992); Isamaa (2012–2022)
- Education: Tallinn University of Technology
- Occupation: Economist

Andrei Prii (5 October 1938 – 25 December 2022) was an Estonian economist and politician. A member of the Estonian Christian Democratic Union, he served on the Supreme Council of Estonia from 1990 to 1992.

Prii died on 25 December 2022 at the age of 84.
