= Arvo Junti =

Estonian lawyer and politician

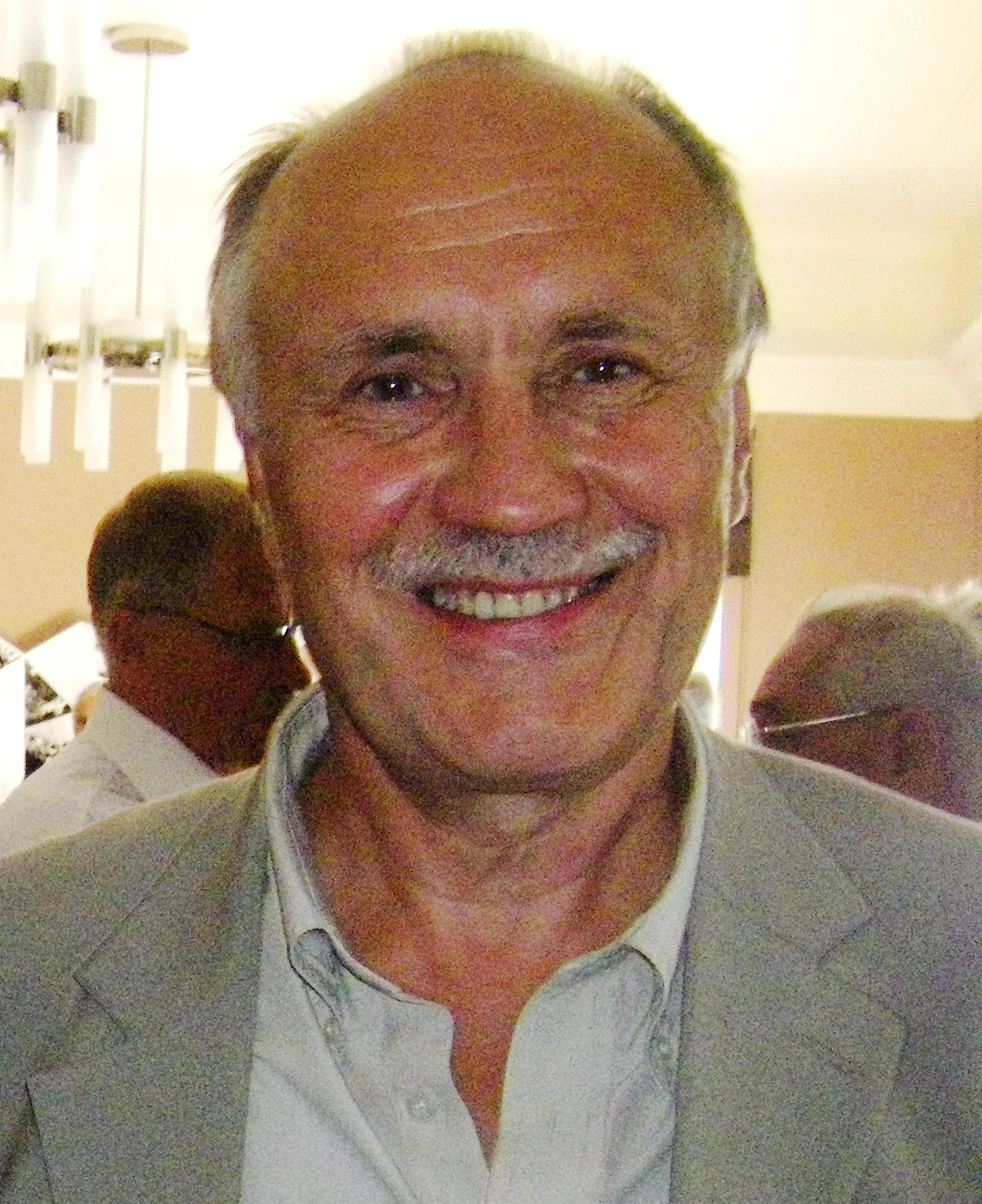
Arvo Junti (2011)

Arvo Junti (born 17 April 1953, Türi) is an Estonian lawyer and politician.

Junti graduated from Vändra Secondary School in 1971 and from the Law Faculty of the University of Tartu in 1976.

He worked, from 1989 to 1990, in the National Planning Committee of the Estonian SSR Council of Ministers and the Ministry of Economic Affairs and Communications.

From 1990 to 1992, he was a member of the Estonian Supreme Soviet. He voted for the Estonian restoration of Independence. He was also an ambassador of the Congress of Estonia and a member of the Estonian Committee.

From 1992 to 1999, he was a member of the Riigikogu, first for the National Party and then for the Estonian Centre Party; from 20 April 1995 to 14 March 1996, he was the deputy chairman of the Riigikogu.

He has been a member of the Estonian Bar Association since 1981. He is the head of law firm Arvo Junti, a sworn advocate since 1994. He has worked as a lecturer at the Mainor Business School, International University Audentes and University Nord.

== Awards ==
- 2002: 5th Class of the Estonian Order of the National Coat of Arms (received 23 February 2002)
- 2006: 3rd Class of the Estonian Order of the National Coat of Arms (received 23 February 2006)

== Literature ==
- Eesti majanduse biograafiline leksikon 1951–2000 AS Kirjastus Ilo, 2003
- "Valitud ja valitsenud..." compiled by Jaan Toomla. Tallinn 1999
