= Eldur =

Estonian male given name

- Gender: Male
- Language: Estonian
- Name day: 11 October

Origin
- Region of origin: Estonia

Eldur is an Estonian and Icelandic male given name.

People named Eldur include:

- Eldur Parder (1928–2003), Estonian politician
