= Lembit Arro =

Estonian politician and judge (1930–2022)

- Born: 15 April 1930; Raikküla Parish, Estonia
- Died: 16 April 2022 (aged 92)

Lembit Arro (15 April 1930 – 16 April 2022) was an Estonian general manager of a collective farm and politician who was most notable for being a voter for the Estonian restoration of Independence.

Arro graduated in 1944 from Kabala Primary School, in 1957 at a high school for the preparation of Kehtna Collective Farmers (junior agronomy) and in 1969 as an agronomist at the Estonian Agricultural Academy, now the Estonian University of Life Sciences.

He was chairman of the Kaiu collective farm, from 1959 to 1990.

From 1990 to 1992, he was a member of the Supreme Council of the Republic of Estonia, initially belonging to the Rural Affairs Committee, later to the Committee on Economic and Monetary Affairs. Between 1992 and 1999, he was a member of the Riigikogu, first receiving 3305 votes; and being reelected in 1995 with 2,480 votes. In 1999, he ran again for the Riigikogu for the Estonian Coalition Party, but only received 293 votes, and as such, was not reelected.

== Awards ==
- Order of the Badge of Honour
- Order of the Red Banner of Labour
- 2002: 5th Class of the Estonian Order of the National Coat of Arms (received 23 February 2002)
- 2006: 3rd Class of the Estonian Order of the National Coat of Arms (received 23 February 2006)
