= Ants Järvesaar =

Estonian politician (born 1948)

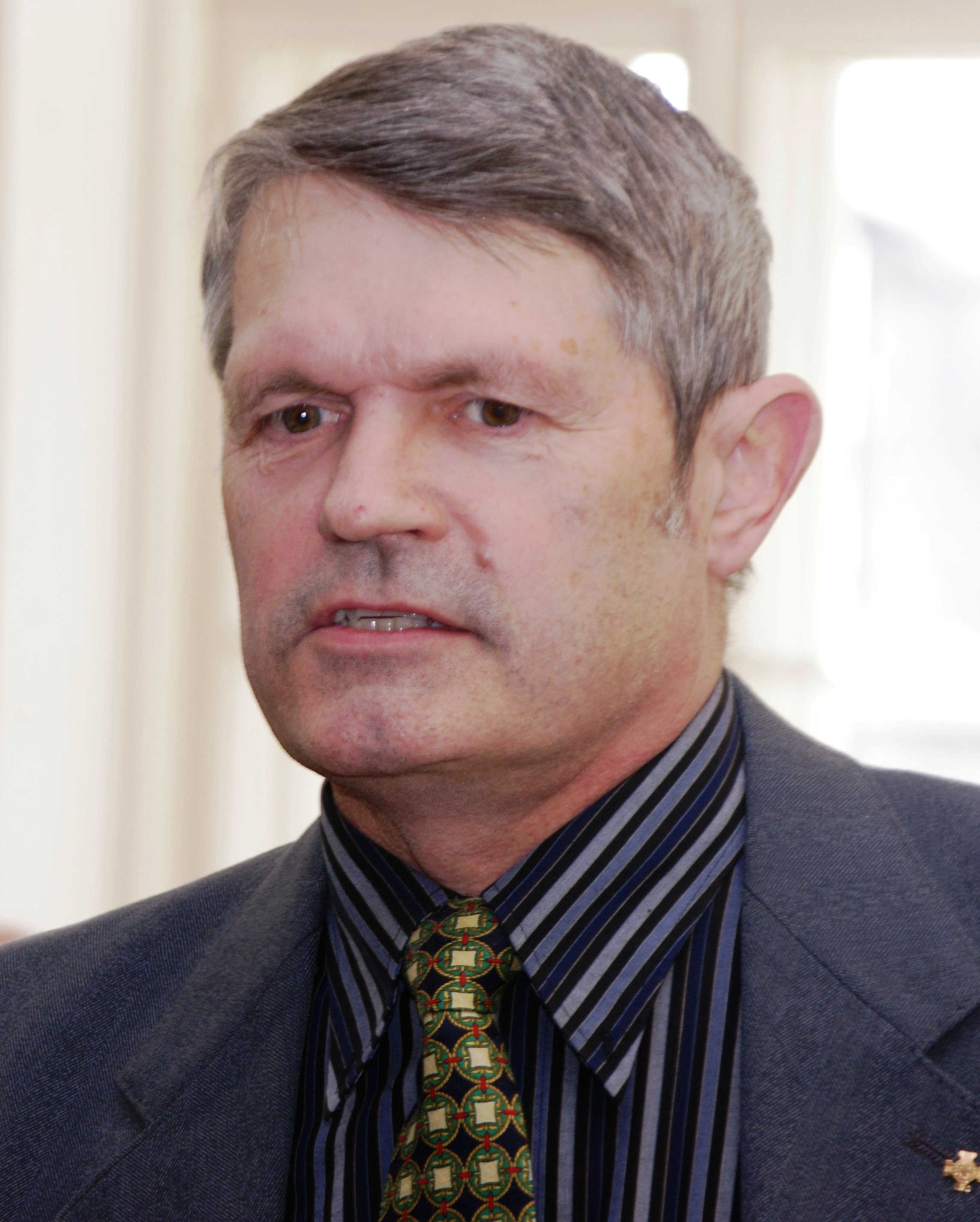
Ants Järvesaar in 2012

Ants Järvesaar (born 10 October 1948 in Surju Parish) is an Estonian farmer and a politician. He was a member of the Estonian Supreme Soviet and voted for the Estonian restoration of Independence. From 2013 to 2014, he was the mayor of the small borough of Häädemeeste.

Järvasaar graduated from Kilingi-Nõmme Secondary School in 1967 and from the Estonian University of Life Sciences in 1981. From 1967 to 1983, he worked as a tractor driver in Surju, and won the title of young worker of the Republic, and from 1983 to 1990, he was chairman of Häädemeeste collective farm.

He was an ambassador to the Supreme Council of the People's Republic of the USSR from 1974 to 1979. From 1990 to 1992, he belonged to the Estonian Supreme Soviet. In the High Council, he was a member of the Social Affairs Committee and the Independent Democrat Group. He voted for the Estonian restoration of Independence.

From 1995 to 1999, he was a member Riigikogu. He was elected to the Riigikogu as part of the Coalition Party and Country Union Party. In the Riigikogu, he was a member of the Maaili Faction (where he was the Deputy Chairman of the Group on 22 April 1998) and was a member of the Social Affairs Committee (where he was the vice-chairman of the Committee in 1995) and a temporary committee member of the special committee for identifying the circumstances of the ruble and identifying the circumstances of bankruptcy of Maa Bank.

Järvasaar is a member of the Conservative People's Party of Estonia. On 7 November 2013, he was elected as the mayor of the small borough of Häädemeeste.

== Awards ==
- Order of the Red Banner of Labour
- Order of Friendship of Peoples
- 2002: 5th Class of the Estonian Order of the National Coat of Arms (received 23 February 2002)
- 2006: 3rd Class of the Estonian Order of the National Coat of Arms (received 23 February 2006)
