= Hillar Kalda =

Estonian physician and politician

Hillar Kalda (born 6 March 1932, Mallika, Võru County) is an Estonian physician and politician, most notable for being one of the voters for the Estonian restoration of Independence.

He graduated from Võru Secondary School in 1950 and from the Faculty of Medicine of the University of Tartu in 1956.

From 1956 to 1959, he worked as the head of the district hospital in Rõuge and as the chief physician of the Võru District Central Hospital and as an X-ray doctor from 1959 to 1986.

From 1961 to 1986, he was a member of the Võru County RSN, the organizers of the Võru County Folklore Guild and a member of the Presidium. He was elected to the Congress of Estonia in February 1990 and in March 1990, as a member of the Supreme Soviet of the Republic of Estonia. In the High Council, he was involved in the work of the Committee on Social Affairs and National Affairs. On 20 August 1991, he voted for the restoration of Estonia's independence.

He participated in the restoration of the Estonian Red Cross organization and was its president from 1991 to 2007.

== Awards ==
- 1973: Doctor of the Estonian SSR
- 1979: Order of the Red Banner of Labour
- 2002: 5th class of the Order of the National Coat of Arms (received 23 February 2002)
- 2006: 3rd class of the Order of the National Coat of Arms (received 23 February 2006)
- 2012: Võru County badge
