= Uno Ugandi =

Estonian physician and politician (1931–2020)

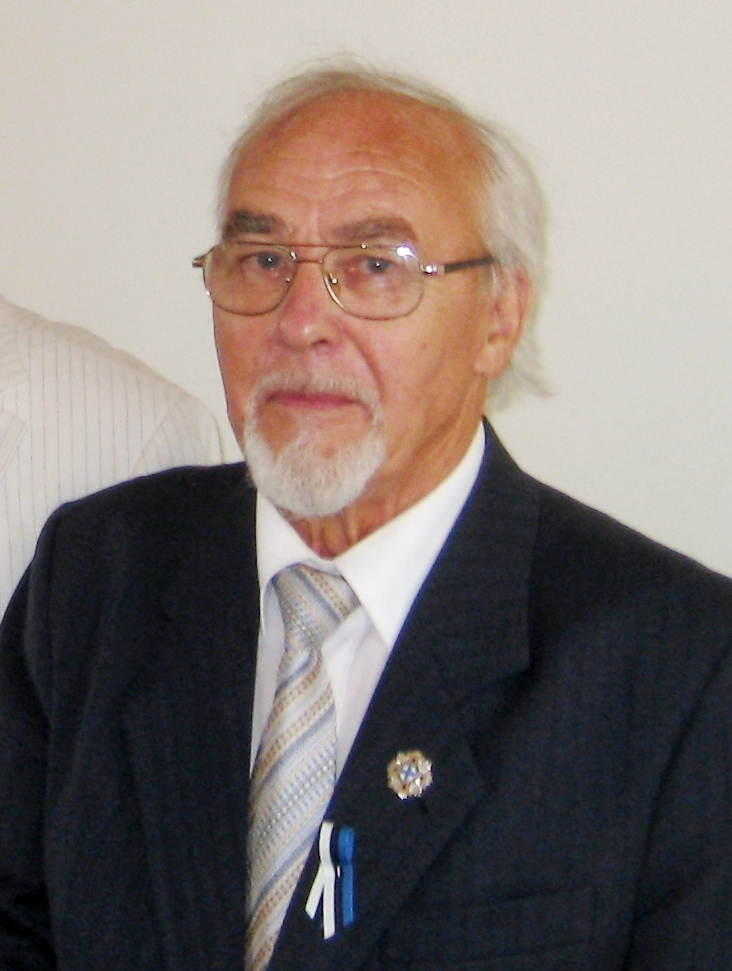
Uno Ugandi

Uno Ugandi (22 June 1931 Tallinn – 18 May 2020) was an Estonian physician and politician.

From 1962 until 1968, Ugandi worked as a surgeon on the island of Saaremaa. From 1968 until 1977, he was a surgeon at the Rapla District Central Hospital, becoming the head of the department in 1973. From 1977 to 1990, he worked as the head of the surgery department of Paide District Central Hospital.

He was a member of Supreme Council of the Republic of Estonia. On 20 August 1991, he voted to in favour of the restoration of Estonian Republic. He was also a member of Estonian Congress.

In 2002, he was awarded with the Order of the National Coat of Arms, V class. In 2006 he was awarded with Order of the National Coat of Arms, III class.
