= Kalju Koha =

Estonian politician and civil servant

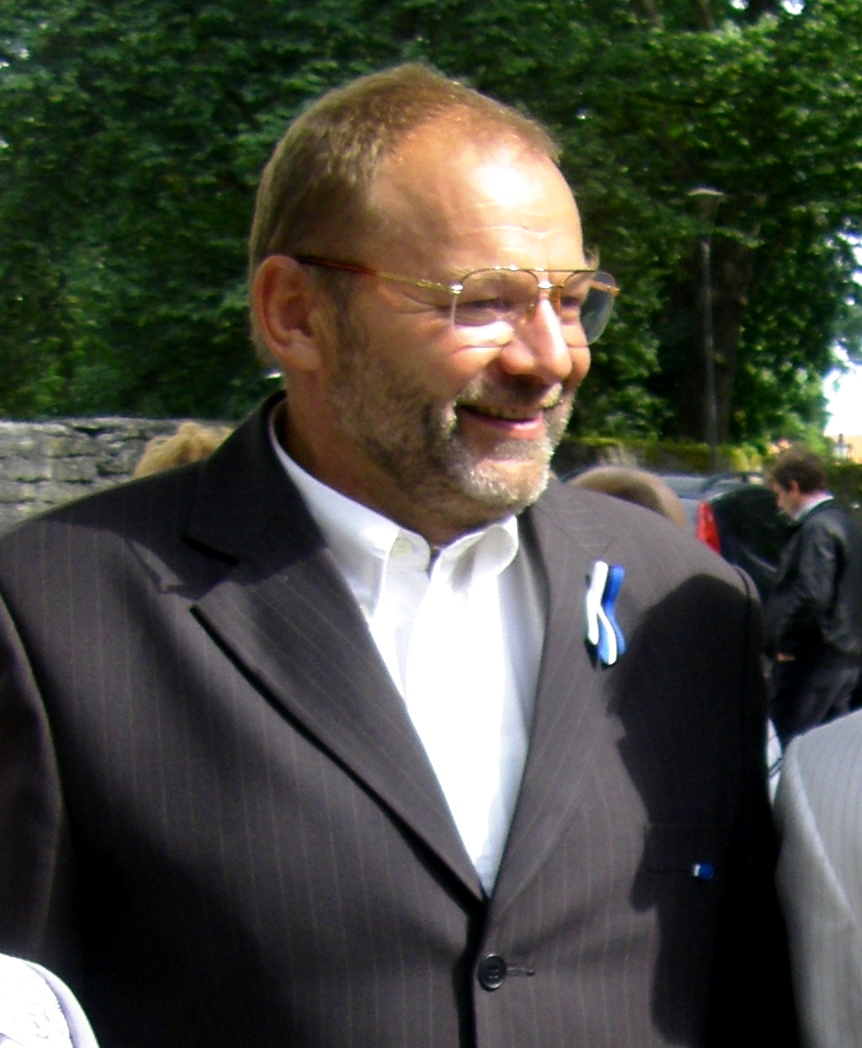
Koha in 2011

Kalju Koha (born 16 August 1956, Tartu) is an Estonian politician and civil servant, most notable for voting for the Estonian restoration of Independence.

He graduated in 1974 from Tartu 7th Secondary School and in 1979 with a degree in electrical engineering from the Estonian University of Life Sciences.

Koha worked as an electrical engineer at the Avangard collective farm from 1979 to 1986, and as its main engineer from 1986 to 1990.

From 1990 to 1992, he was a member of the Supreme Soviet of Estonia, where he was a member of the Economic Affairs Committee. He voted for the Estonian restoration of independence. He was a member of the Popular Front of Estonia. He was also a member of the Constitutional Assembly.

From 1992 to 1993, Koha was the governor of Tartu County, and from 1994 to 2000, the Auditor General of the National Audit Office of Estonia, and the head of the Southern Estonian Department. Since 2000, he has been the head of Eesti Energia's AS Distribution Network in Tartu.

He was a member of the Communist Party of Estonia from 1984 to 1990; He was a founding member of the Estonian Land-Centre Party in 1990.

== Awards ==
- 2002: 5th Class of the Estonian Order of the National Coat of Arms (received 23 February 2002)
- 2006: 3rd Class of the Estonian Order of the National Coat of Arms (received 23 February 2006)
