= Rein Järlik =

Estonian politician and journalist

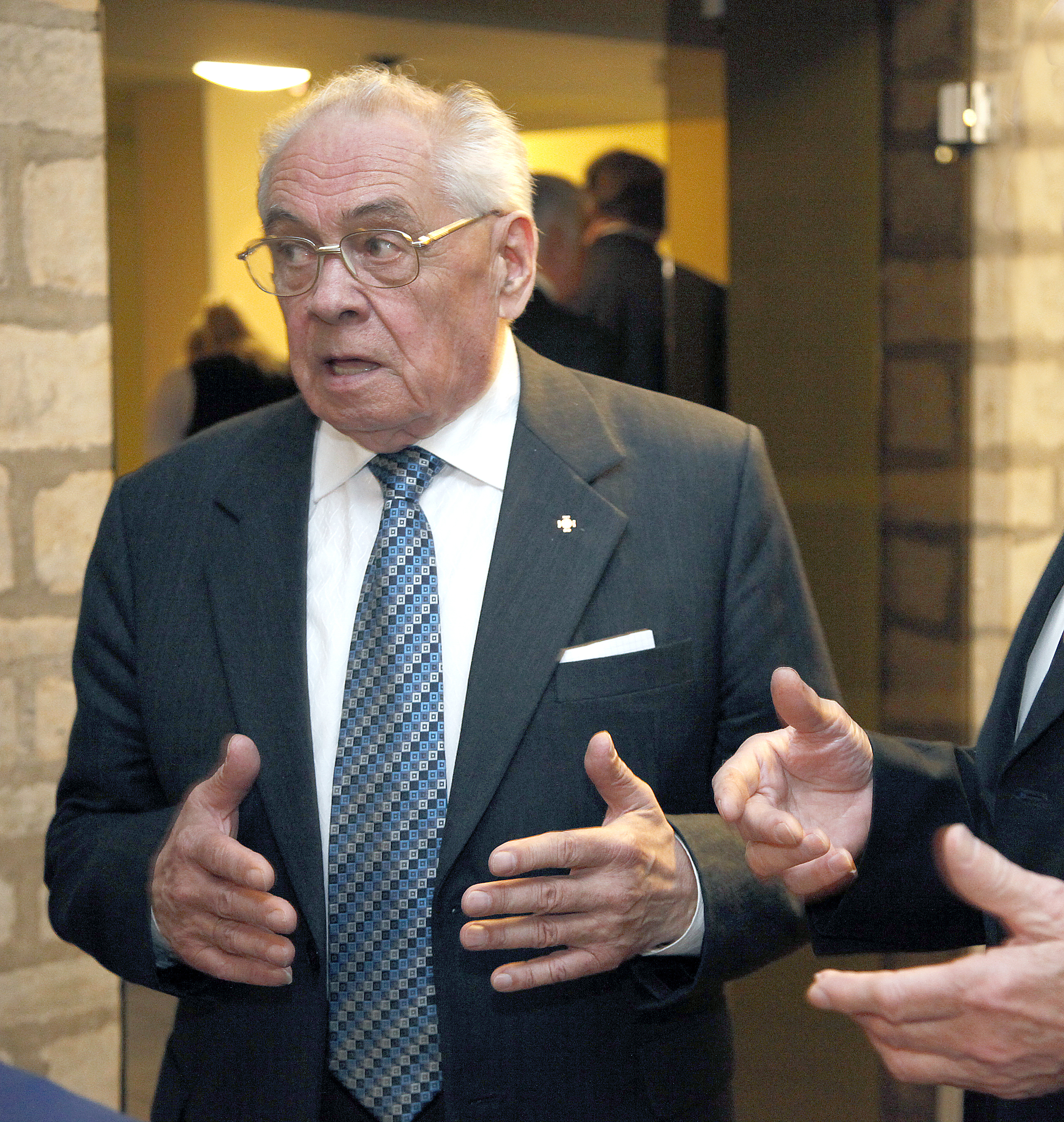
Rein Järlik in 2013

Rein Järlik (né Ullo Järlik (until 1937); born 8 October 1935, Tartu) is a former Estonian politician and television journalist.

He was a presenter at Eesti Televisioon and one of the leaders of the Singing Revolution.

Järlik graduated from the University of Tartu in 1959 as a physicist, then he taught physics at Puhja Gymnasium for 6 years.

From 1965 to 1990, he worked at the Eesti Televisioon station in Tartu. He was featured in the series "Surma ei otsinud keegi" and "Viiekümnendad", the latter showing life after the Second World War, including collectivization, and Stalinist repressions in Estonia.

Along with Feliks Undusk and Hagi Šein, Järlik produced Mõtleme veel (1988), an important reflection of the democratization, freedom of expression and of the Singing Revolution in Estonia.

Järlik participated in the foundation of the Popular Front of Estonia. He was also a member of the Congress of Estonia, the Constituent Assembly, the Estonian Supreme Soviet from 1990 to 1992, and was a member of the Riigikogu from 1992 to 1999 as a member of the Estonian Coalition Party. He voted for the Estonian restoration of Independence.

As a journalist, he has used the pseudonym Madis Udu.

== Awards ==
- 1985: Estonian SSR Journalism Award
- 2001: 5th class of the Order of the White Star (received 24 February 2001)
- 2006: 2nd class of the Order of the National Coat of Arms (received 23 February 2006)
