= Andres Ammas =

Estonian politician (1962–2018)

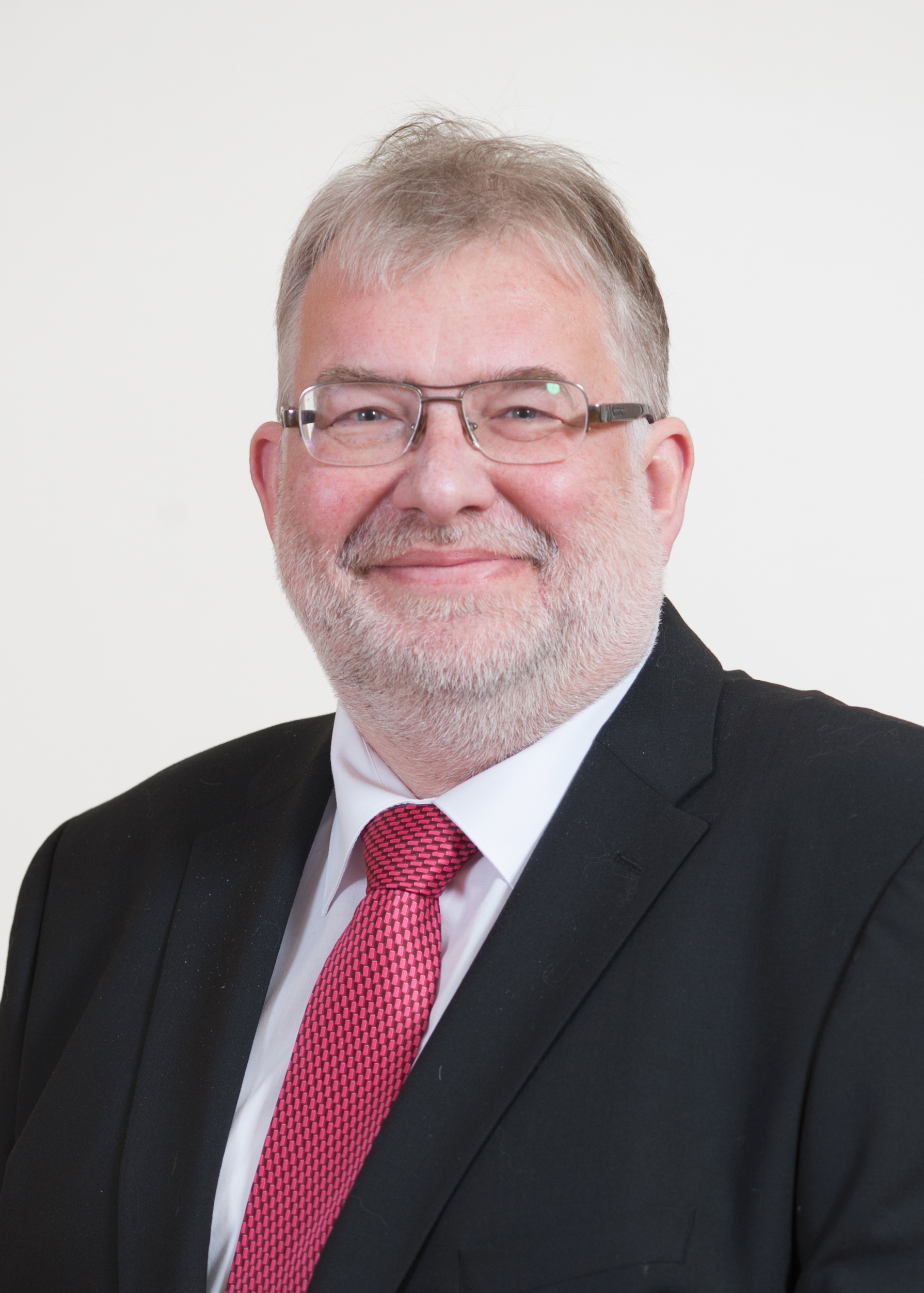
Andres Ammas in 2015.

Andres Ammas (25 February 1962, Tallinn – 4 April 2018) was an Estonian politician, representing the Estonian Free Party in the Riigikogu. He was elected with 1,859 votes in the 2015 election.

In 1990–1992, Ammas was a member of the Supreme Council of the Republic of Estonia and voted for the Estonian restoration of Independence on 20 August 1991.

== Awards ==
- 5th Class of the Estonian Order of the National Coat of Arms (received 24 February 2002)
- 3rd Class of the Estonian Order of the National Coat of Arms (received 23 February 2006)
- Haapsalu badge (2014)
