= Valeri Kois =

Estonian politician

Valeri Kois (born 10 June 1950, Tallinn) is an Estonian politician, most notable for voting for the Estonian restoration of Independence.

He was born in Tallinn, but moved to Leningrad Oblast at an early age, where he graduated from the Institute of High School and Civil Engineers. After leaving military service in 1976, he settled in Kohtla-Järve.

Kois initially worked at Kohtla-Järve Road Repair and Construction Authority. At the beginning of 1990, he was the secretary of the Kohtla-Järve Regional Branch of the Communist Party of Estonia.

From 1990 to 1992, he was a member of the Supreme Soviet of Estonia. He voted for the restoration of Estonia's independence.

Kois is self-employed and lives in Kuremäe.

== Awards ==
- 2002: 5th Class of the Estonian Order of the National Coat of Arms (received 23 February 2002)
- 2006: 3rd Class of the Estonian Order of the National Coat of Arms (received 21 February 2006)
