= Rein Tamme =

Estonian politician (1940–2024)

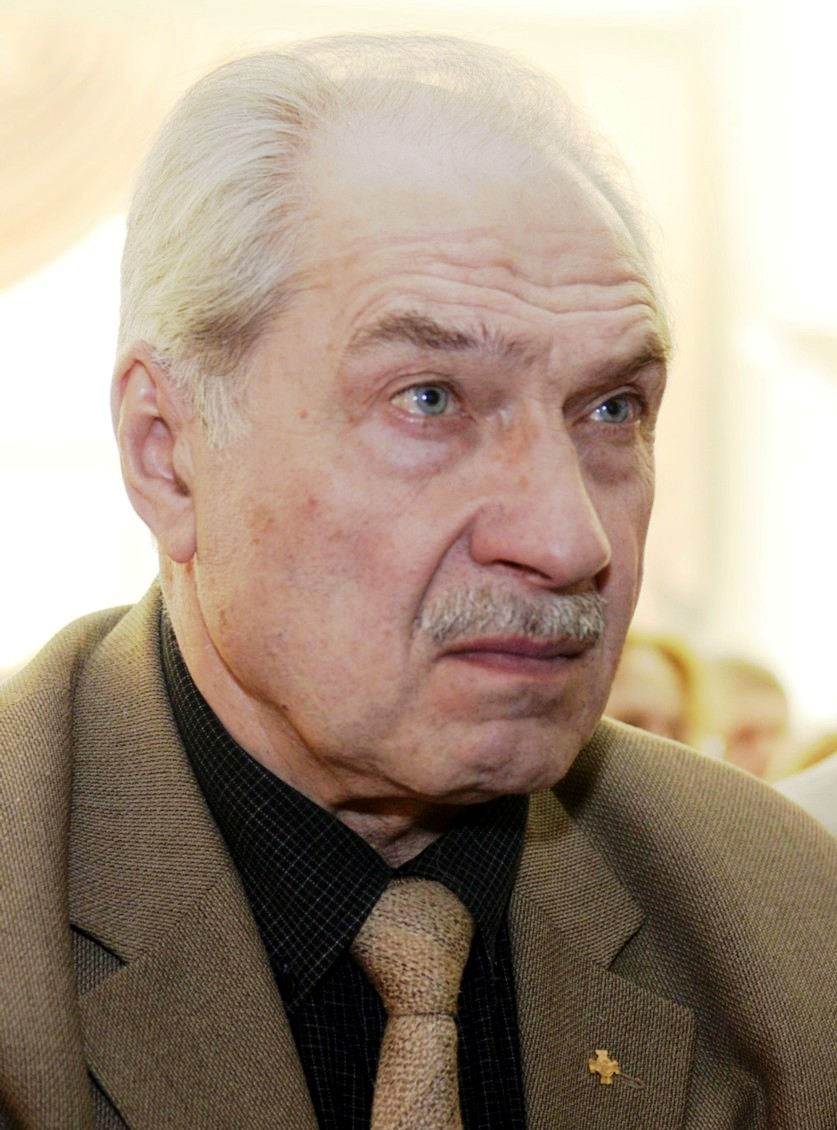
- Tamme in 2012

Member of the Supreme Council of the Republic of Estonia
- In office 29 March 1990 – 14 September 1992

Personal details
- Born: 28 March 1940 Rakvere, Estonia
- Died: 8 October 2024 (aged 84)
- Party: CPSU; EK; Estonian Coalition Party
- Education: Tallinn Technical Secondary School for Building and Mechanics; Tallinn Technical University
- Occupation: Civil engineer

Rein Tamme (28 March 1940 – 8 October 2024) was an Estonian civil engineer and politician. A member of the Communist Party of the Soviet Union and subsequently the Estonian Centre Party and the Estonian Coalition Party, he served in the Supreme Council from 1990 to 1992.

Tamme died on 8 October 2024 at the age of 84.
