= Eduard Päll =

Estonian politician, linguist, and writer

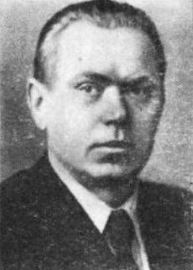
Image of Eduard Päll

Eduard Päll (pseudonym Hugo Angervaks; 15 October 1903 in Koosa, Kreis Dorpat, Governorate of Livonia – 13 June 1989 in Tallinn) was an Estonian politician, linguist and writer.

1947–1950, he was the chairmen of the Presidium of the Supreme Soviet of the Estonian Soviet Socialist Republic.
