= Jaan Lippmaa =

Estonian politician and engineer (1942–2021)

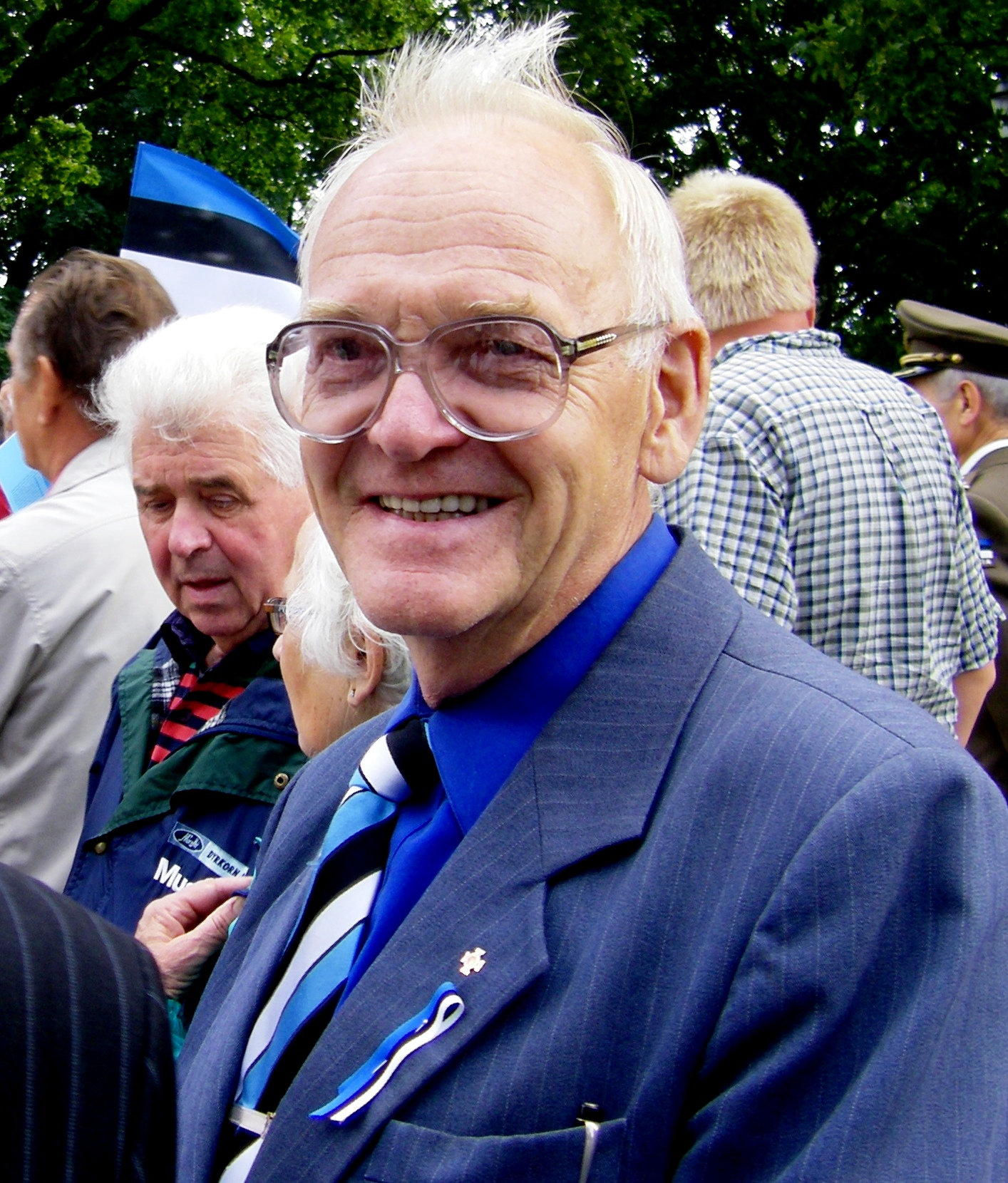
- Lippmaa in 2011

Member of the Supreme Soviet of the Estonian Soviet Socialist Republic
- In office 1990–1990

Member of the Supreme Council of the Republic of Estonia
- In office 1990–1992

Personal details
- Born: 30 March 1942 Pärnu, German occupied Estonia
- Died: 16 November 2021 (aged 79) Pärnu, Estonia

Jaan Lippmaa (30 March 1942 – 16 November 2021) was an Estonian engineer and politician. He was a member of the August 20 Club.

Lippmaa graduated from the Institute of Automation of Tallinn University of Technology in 1968 with a degree in automation and telemechanics. He worked in a dairy factory from 1968 to 1978 before working as a fisherman from 1978 to 1990. From 1990 to 1992, he served on the Supreme Soviet of the Estonian Soviet Socialist Republic (renamed the Supreme Council of the Republic of Estonia in 1990). On 20 August 1991, he voted in favor of Estonian Restoration of Independence.

== Awards ==
- 2002: Order of the National Coat of Arms, V Class
- 2006: Order of the National Coat of Arms, III Class
