= Johan Eichfeld =

Estonian biologist and politician

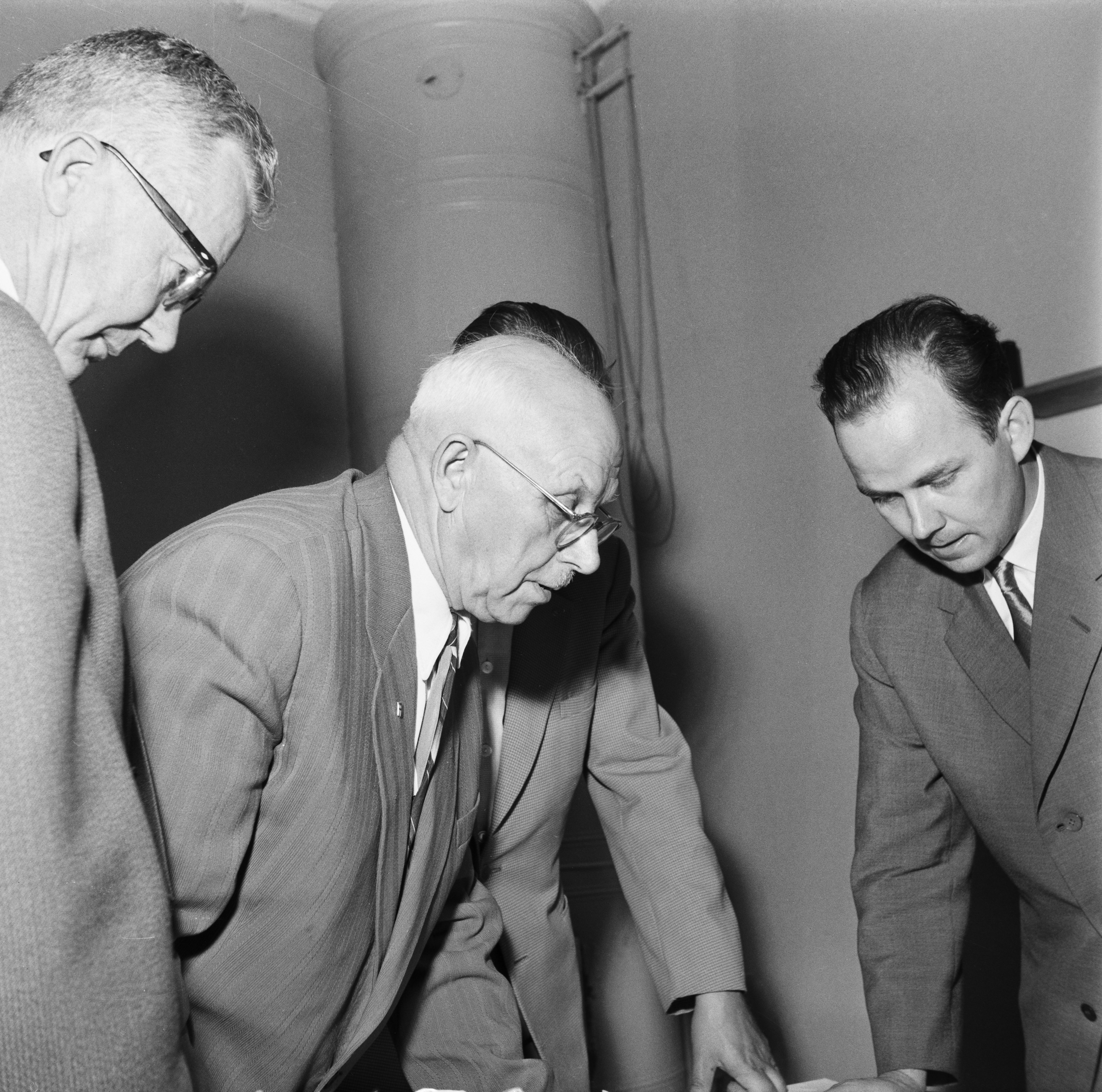
Eichfeld (middle) visiting Oulu, Finland in 1961.

Johan Eichfeld (26 January 1893 Paide – 20 April 1989 Tallinn) was a Soviet and Estonian biologist and politician.

From 1958 to 1961, he was the chairman of the Presidium of the Supreme Soviet of the Estonian Soviet Socialist Republic.
