= Enn Leisson =

Estonian politician and journalist

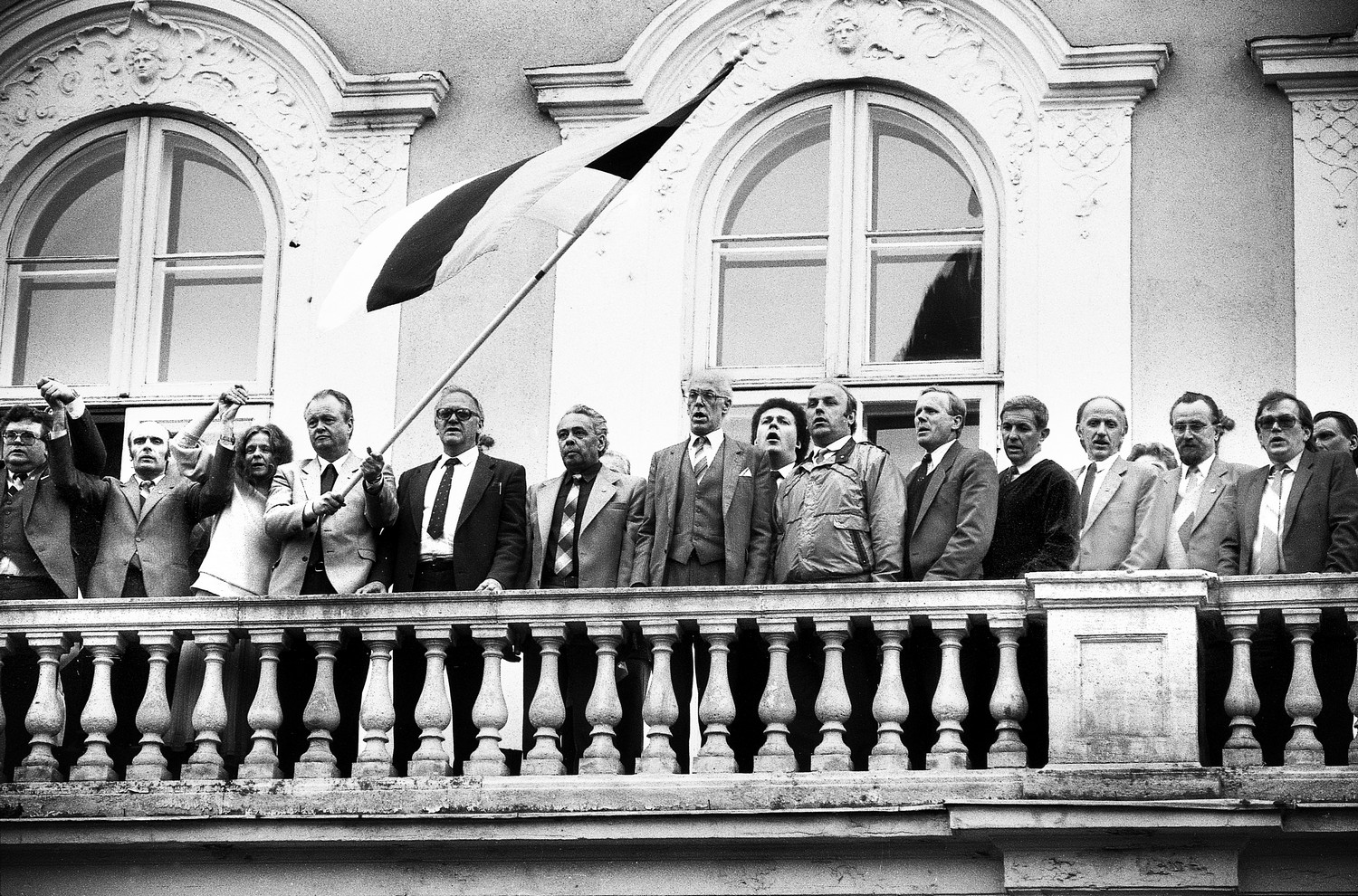

Enn Leisson (11 July 1942 Tallinn – 10 June 1998 Tallinn) was an Estonian politician and journalist.

He was a member of XII Supreme Soviet of Estonia. He was also a member of Congress of Estonia, and Constitutional Assembly of Estonia.

He wrote several screenwritings for documentary films.
