= Toomas Kork =

Estonian activist and politician

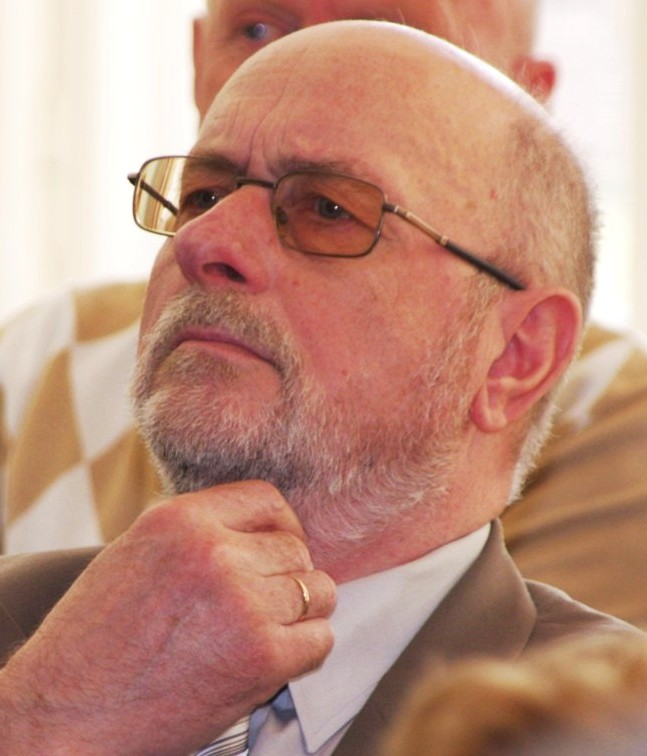
Toomas Kork in 2012

Toomas Kork (born 20 November 1945, Tartu) is an Estonian social activist, farmer, businessman, and politician, most notable for voting for the Estonian restoration of Independence.

Kork graduated in 1970 from the Faculty of Economic at the Estonian University of Life Sciences (EPA). From 1971 to 1975, he was an EPA Laboratory Head and then until 1988 was Deputy Director and Director of the Tamsalu Cereal Product Combine. From 1988 to 1989, he was the first secretary of the Rakvere Regional Committee of the Communist Party of Estonia.

Kork was a member of the Popular Front of Estonia's Initiative Center and council, the head of the Rakvere branch of the Popular Front of Estonia, and a member of the Supreme Soviet of the Estonian SSR and the Baltic Assembly. He participated in the preparation and adoption of the Declaration of Sovereignty on 15 and 16 November 1988. He was in charge of drafting the draft of the Alternative Service Act, and then, until the formation of the Ministry of Defence, he was chairman of the relevant government committee. He actively participated in the creation of Estonian Civil Protection, Border Guard and Police. Kork was one of the 69 members of the Supreme Council that voted for the restoration of the independence of the Republic of Estonia.

Kork later worked at the office of Arnold Rüütel, became the Director General of Rakvere KIT (Commercial Inventory Factory, later named AS ETK Sisustus), and, until retirement, was Chairman of the Management Board of AS Porsa Est.

== Awards ==
- 2002: 5th Class of the Estonian Order of the National Coat of Arms (received 23 February 2002)
- 2006: 3rd Class of the Estonian Order of the National Coat of Arms (received 23 February 2006)
- 2010: Baltic Assembly Medal of Merit
- 2001: "Ilves ja mõõk", EV Border Guard Order
- 2001: "10 aastat taastatud piirivalvet", commemorative medal
- 2001: "10 aastat taastatud kaitseväge", commemorative medal
- 2014: "20 aastat vene vägede lahkumisest", commemorative medal

== Personal life ==
His brother, Andres Kork, is a doctor who was the Minister of Health under Tiit Vähi, as well as the chairman of the Tallinn City Council and the President of the Estonian Association of Doctors. Another brother, Jüri Kork, was also in politics, and was also a member of the Supreme Soviet of the Estonian SSR who voted for the Estonian restoration of Independence. His sister, Anu Kasmel, is a psychiatrist and health scientist. During the Soviet occupation, the Kork family kept the secrecy of the first, blue-and-white flag, completed in 1884. In 1991, an unidentified flag was uncovered at the farmhouse of their uncle's farm and was handed over to the Estonian Students' Society.
