= Ants Veetõusme =

Estonian politician

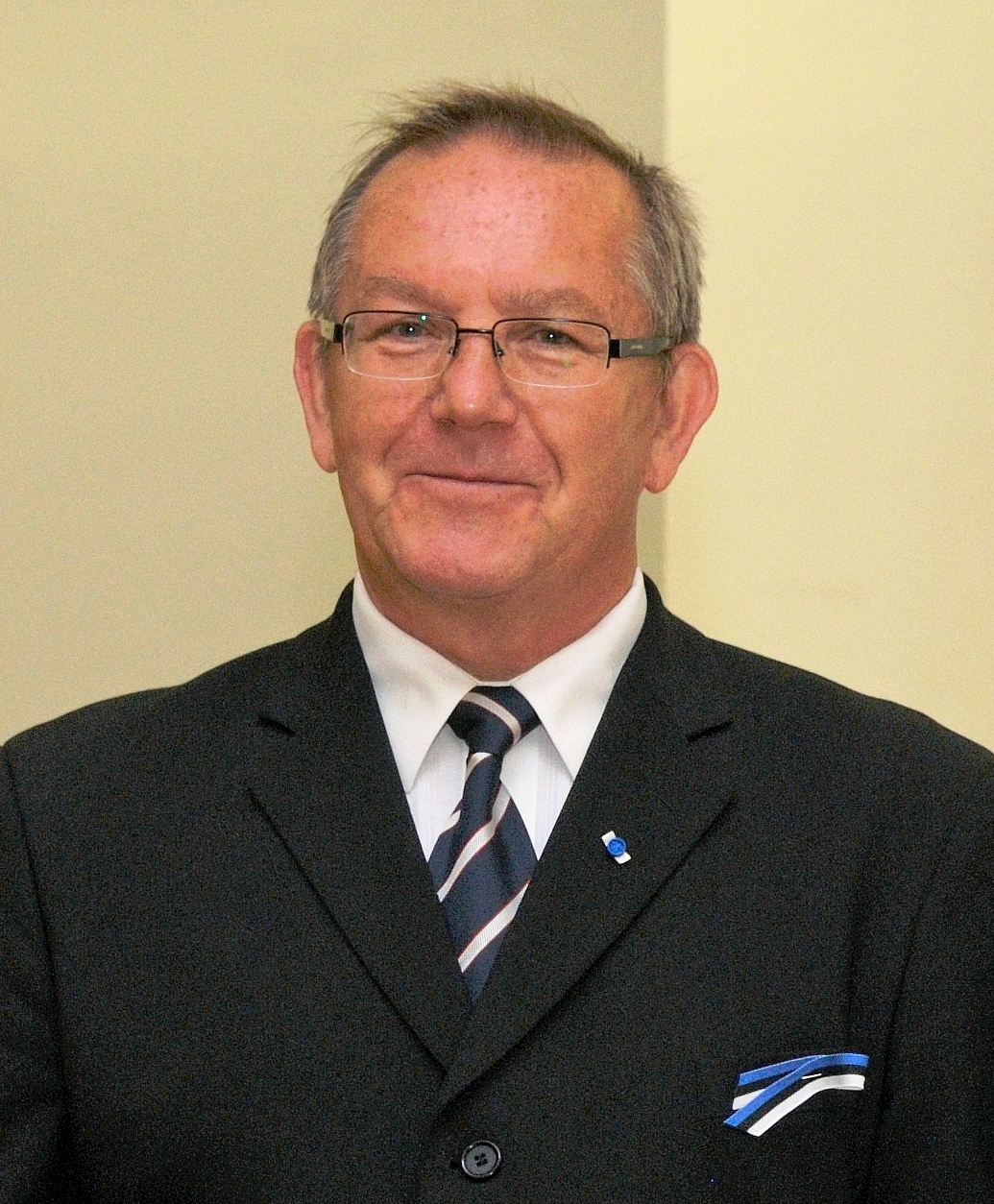
Ants Veetõusme

Ants Veetõusme (born 3 May 1949 in Tallinn) is an Estonian politician, fencer, and financial and sports figure.

Veetõusme graduated from Tartu State University in 1972 with a degree in finance and credit. From 1991 until 1993, he was the Mayor of Tartu.

From 1991 until 2004, he was the president of Estonian Fencing Association.

In 2002, he was awarded with Order of the National Coat of Arms, IV Class. In 2006, he was awarded with Order of the National Coat of Arms, III Class.
