= Siiksaare =

Village in Estonia

- Village
- Location in Estonia
- Coordinates: 58°19′22″N 22°53′57″E
- Country: Estonia
- County: Saare County
- Municipality: Saaremaa Parish

Population (2011 Census)
  - Total: 26

Siiksaare is a village in Saaremaa Parish, Saare County, Estonia, on the island of Saaremaa. As of the 2011 Census, the settlement's population was 26.
