= Jüri Liim =

Estonian politician, investigative journalist and track and field athlete

Jüri Liim in 1990

Jüri Liim (born 9 November 1940 in Tallinn) is a former Estonian politician, investigative journalist and track and field athlete (long-distance runner).

1965-1976 he won several medals at Estonian championships.

In 1990–1992 he was a member of parliament of Estonia (Ülemnõukogu) and Estonian Congress. He was one of the founders and leaders of Estonian Green Party (Estonian: Eesti Roheline Partei) (later Estonian Greens).

== Awards ==
- 2006: Order of the National Coat of Arms, III class.
