= Ants Paju =

Estonian politician (1944–2011)

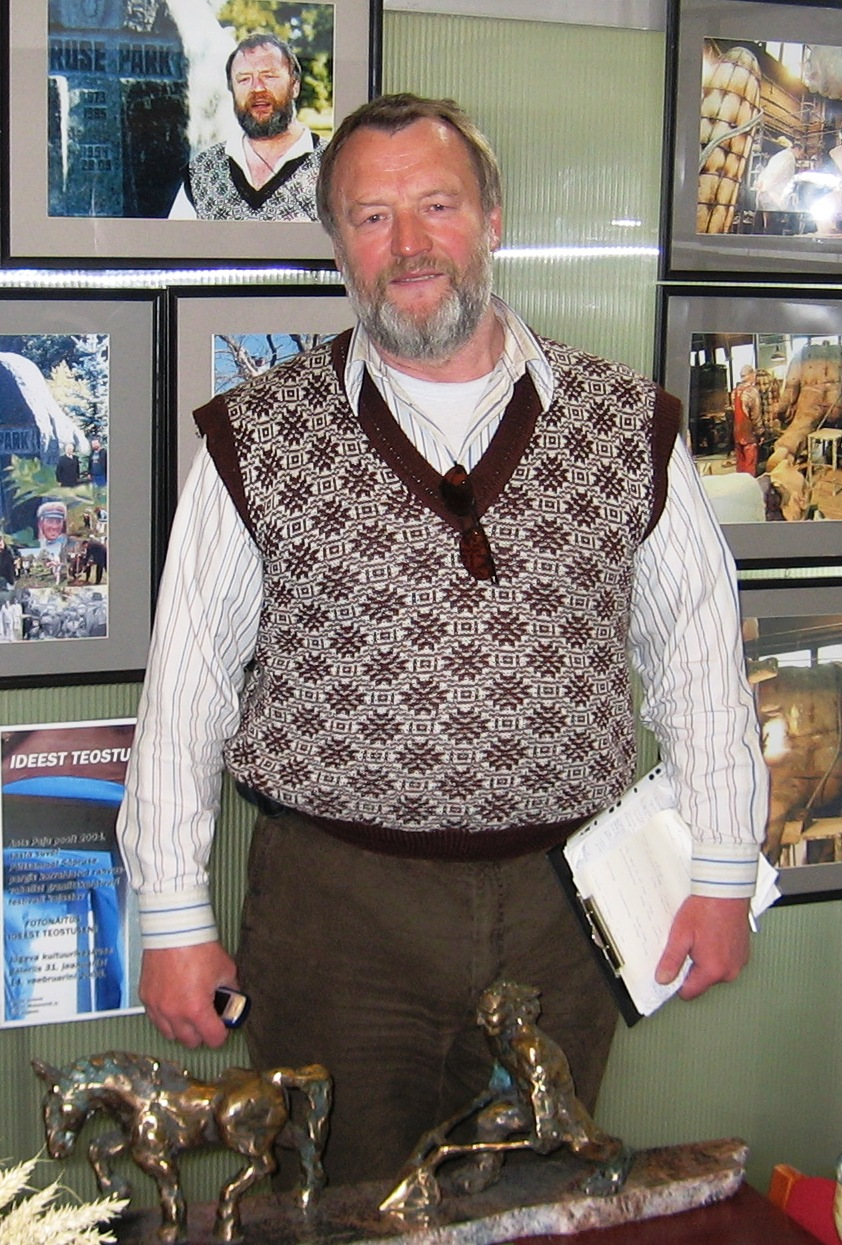
Ants Paju in 2006

Ants Paju (10 September 1944 – 28 June 2011) was an Estonian politician, journalist, athlete, and engineer. He was a member of VIII Riigikogu.

Ants Paju was born in the village of Tamsi, Pajusi Rural Municipality, Viljandi County (now, in Põltsamaa Parish, Jõgeva County) during the German occupation of Estonia. In 1949, aged four, he was deported with his family to Siberia with his family by Soviet authorities. Following the death of Joseph Stalin and the Khrushchev Thaw, the family were permitted to return to Estonia in 1955. He graduated from secondary school in Põltsamaa in 1963, and from the Estonian Academy of Agriculture (now, the Estonian University of Life Sciences) in 1970, with a degree in forest engineering. From 1974 to 1990, he was a member of the Communist Party. In 1979, he graduated from the Leningrad Higher Party School with a degree in journalism.

He began participating in sports in 1957. Under the guidance of Ahto Talving, he trained as a middle-distance running, later he trained mainly in shot put and discus. In 1970 he became the champion of track and field sports associations in discus and in 1972, shot put. In 1972, he won a silver medal at the Estonian Athletics Championships and a bronze medal in 1973. Paju competed on the Estonian team from 1972 until 1973.

As a journalist, he worked as the deputy editor of the Jõgeva district newspaper Punalipp and the editor-in-chief of the magazine Eesti Loodus.

From 2000 until 2001, Paju was the mayor of Jõgeva. In 2001, he was awarded the Order of the White Star, V Class. In 2003, he was awarded the Order of the National Coat of Arms, III Class.

Paju died in 2011, aged 66, and is buried in Põltsamaa cemetery. A memorial and bench created by Tauno Kangro to honour to Paju was unveiled in Sõpruse Park in Jõgeva in 2018. Paju had founded the park in 1973.
