= Tõnu Anton =

Estonian politician and judge

Tõnu Anton (born 26 April 1953, in Pärnu) is an Estonian former politician and judge, most notable for being a voter for the Estonian restoration of Independence.

== Biography ==
He graduated from Pärnu 1st Secondary School in 1971, and in 1976 from the Faculty of Law of the University of Tartu.

After he graduated and until 1990, he worked at the Tartu City RSN Executive Committee. In addition, he was Deputy Director of Tartu Commercial Bank. He was developing a new electoral law of the Supreme Council following democratic principles, adopted by the XI Supreme Council on November 17, 1989.

During the Estonian Supreme Soviet election in 1990, Anton was elected as a member of the 1990s incarnation of the Vaba Eesti party and a citizens' initiative to nominate a candidate. In the Supreme Council, he represented the Popular Front of Estonia and the Social Democratic Party (until June 1991) and became chair of the Legal Affairs Committee. He was a part of the Constitutional Assembly.

Between 1993 and 2016 he was a member of the Supreme Court of Estonia. He was chairman of the Administrative Law Chamber of the Supreme Court.

The current President of Estonia, Ülle Madise, is his daughter.

== Awards ==
- 1999: 2nd class of the Order of the White Star (received 23 February 1999)
- 2006: 2nd class of the Order of the National Coat of Arms (received 23 February 2006)
