= Peet Kask =

Estonian physicist, political scientist, and politician

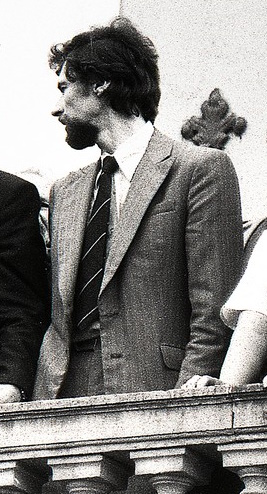
Kask on the balcony of Toompea Castle during the 15 May 1990 mass rally at Lossi plats, in which a pro-Soviet, anti-independence Intermovement crowd attempted to overtake the Riigikogu. Kask and many other pro-restoration of independence politicians faced the crowd. Thousands of Estonians arrived at the behest of Edgar Savisaar and forced the Intermovement agitators to disperse.

Peet Kask (born 21 February 1948) is an Estonian physicist, political scientist and former politician, most notable for voting for the Estonian restoration of Independence.

Kask graduated from the University of Tartu in 1971 with a degree in physics. He defended his dissertation in 1975. He studied politics at Columbia University from 1993 to 1994.

He worked at the National Institute of Chemical Physics and Biophysics from its creation until 1990. His field of research is fluorescence-based detection techniques for molecules. He is one of the largest owners of patents in Estonia.

Kask helped with many of the findings of the application of the German company Evotech-Technologies products. At the end of 2006, the US company PerkinElmer bought Evotech-Technologies.

== Political activity ==
Kask was a co-author of the letter of 40 intellectuals.

He was a member of the Estonian Congress and the Supreme Soviet of Estonia from 1990 to 1992, and a member of the Constitutional Assembly from 1991 to 1992. He was one of the leaders of the Popular Front of Estonia, as well as Rein Taagepera, a campaign manager in the presidential election in 1992.

He was a member of Wellesto (:et).

== Bibliography ==
He has published articles introducing democratic mechanisms.

- Kask, Peet 1988. Tühjadest laikudest demokraatias. Looming 3: 366.
- 1996. Institutional development of the parliament of Estonia. The Journal of Legislative Studies 2(1): 193-212
- 2010. Millist jalga lonkab Eesti demokraatia. Postimees (Arvamus, Kultuur), 6. March, pages 6–7

== Awards ==
- 2002: 5th Class of the Estonian Order of the National Coat of Arms (received 23 February 2002)
- 2006: 3rd Class of the Estonian Order of the National Coat of Arms (received 23 February 2006)
