= Jüri Rätsep =

Estonian lawyer, politician and judge

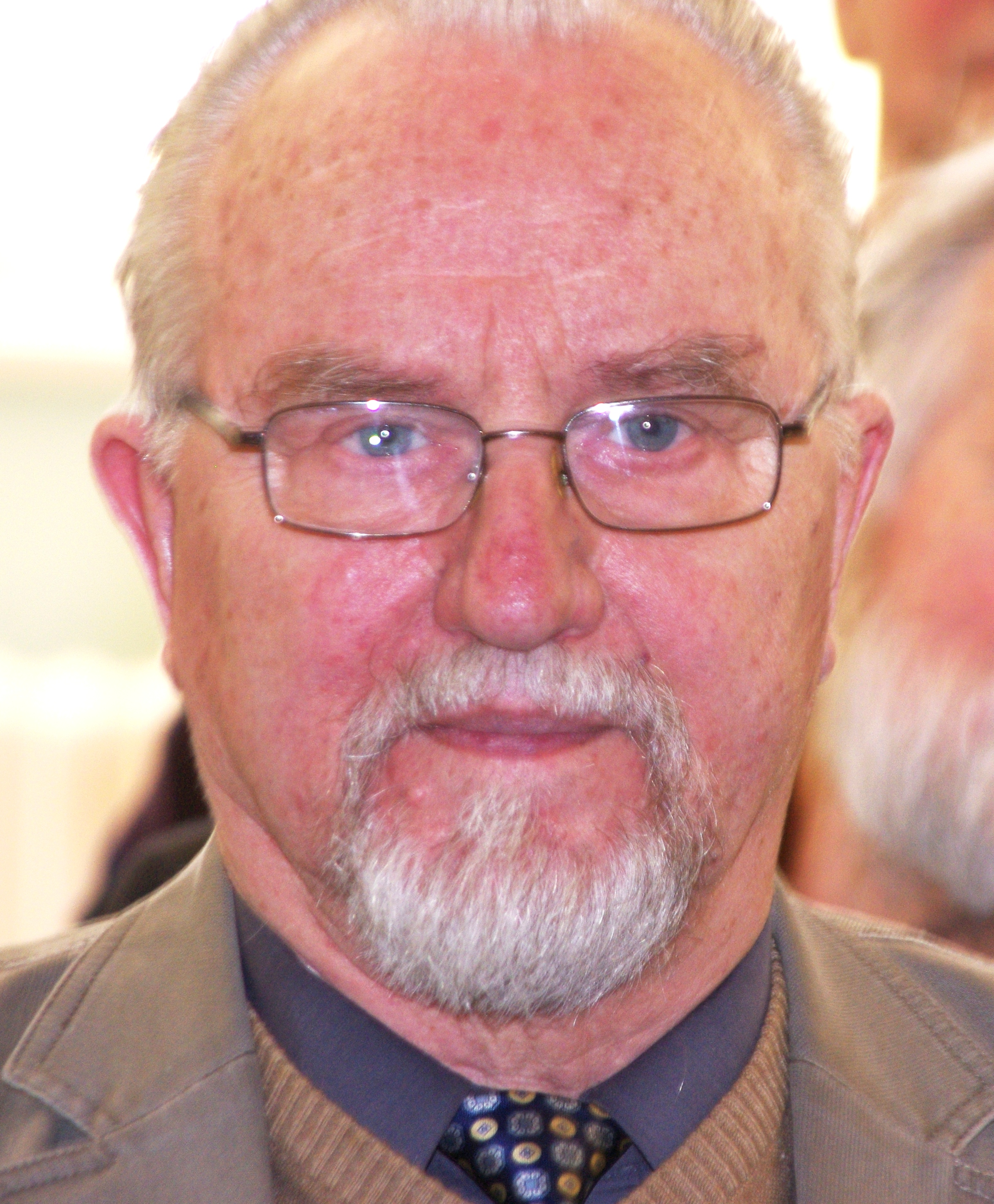
Jüri Rätsep (2012)

Jüri Rätsep (3 July 1935 – 1 August 2018) was an Estonian lawyer, politician and judge.

He graduated in 1956 from the Elva Workers' High School and in 1961 from the law faculty of the University of Tartu. He worked as a researcher and assistant prosecutor in the Viljandi Prosecutor's Office from 1961 to 1966; Since 1966 he was a lawyer in Viljandi's legal counsel and he was a member of the Estonian Bar Association.

From 1990 to 1992 he was member of the Supreme Council of the Republic of Estonia, he was a member of the press commission and vice chairman of the Ethics Committee. On 20 August 1991 he voted for the restoration of the Republic of Estonia. He was also a member of the I and II Committees of the Estonian Committee and its board member; as well as from 1991 to 1992 as a member of the Constitutional Assembly. From 1988 he was a member of the Central Committee of the Sakala County Popular Front.

From 11 August 1993 to 14 February 2002 he was a judge of the Supreme Court.

== Awards ==
- 2000: Order of the White Star
- 2006: Order of the National Coat of Arms
