= Aldo Tamm =

Estonian politician (born 1953)

Aldo Tamm (born 24 September 1953 Viljandi) is an Estonian politician. 1994–1995, he was Minister of Agriculture. He was a member of VII Riigikogu.
