= Georg Erich Põld =

Estonian politician

Georg Erich Põld (also Jüri Põld; born 29 July 1952, in Kingissepa) is an Estonian politician. He was a member of the VII and VIII Riigikogu.
