= Enn Tupp =

Estonian politician (born 1941)

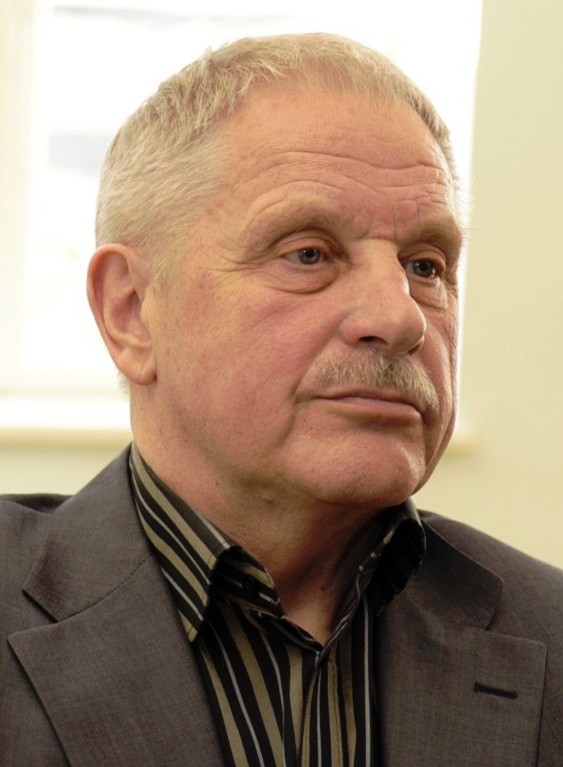
Enn Tupp

Enn Tupp (born 3 October 1941 in Vohjna Parish, Virumaa) is an Estonian politician, diplomat, biathlete and Estonian Defense Forces major.

From 1994 to 1995, he was Minister of Defence.
