= Eldur Parder =

Estonian politician (1928–2003)

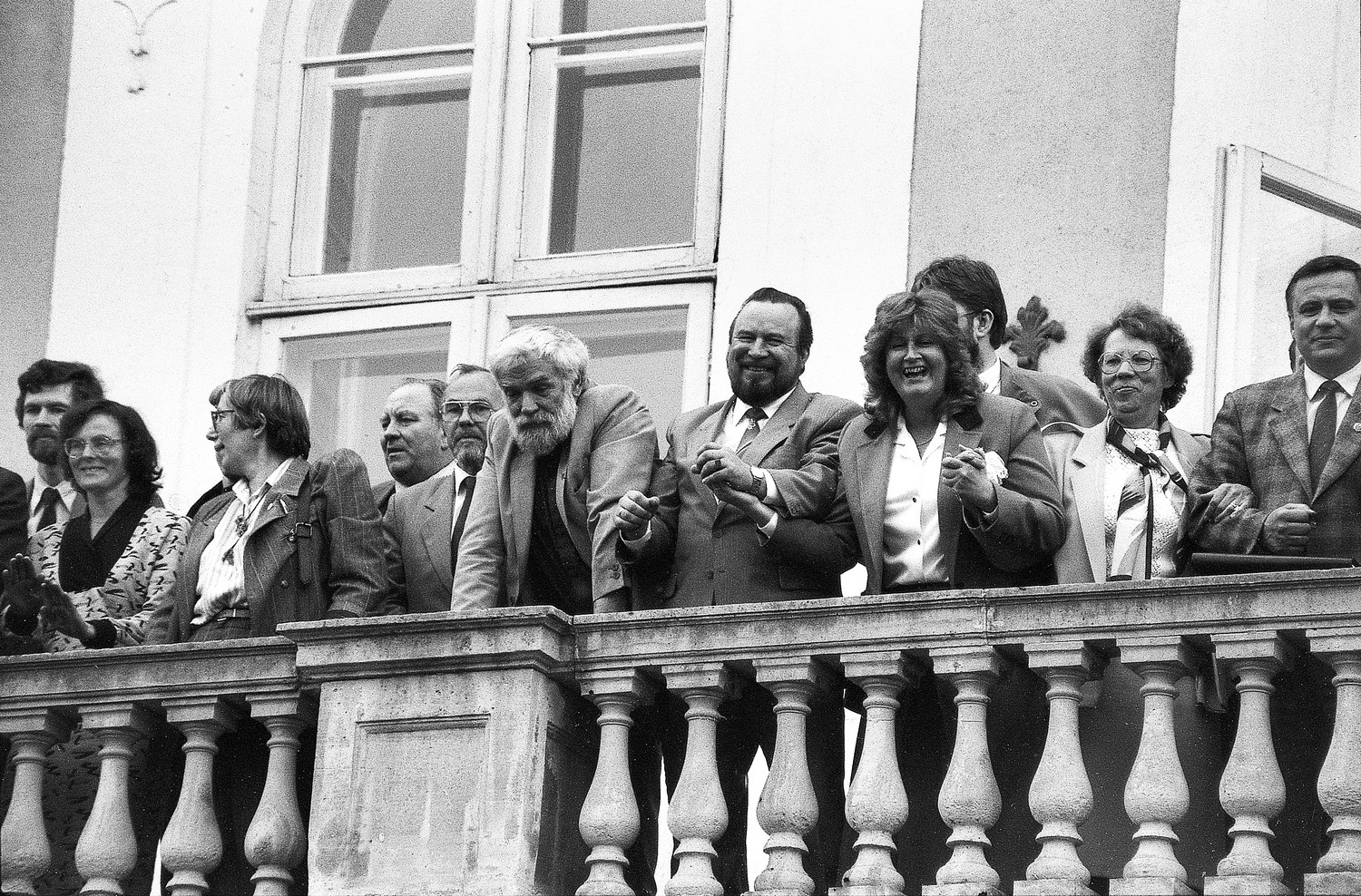
Toompea 15.05.90. Supreme Council of the Estonian SSR. Peet Kask, Liia Hänni, Marju Lauristin, Eldur Parder, Uno Ugandi, Enn Põldroos, Ülo Nugis, Mai Kolossova, Helgi Viirelaid and Minister of the Interior Olev Laanjärv.

Eldur Parder (10 August 1928 Tartu – 30 May 2003) was an Estonian politician. He was a member of VIII Riigikogu.
