= Supreme Soviet of the Estonian Soviet Socialist Republic =

Soviet legislative assembly of the Estonian SSR

Supreme Soviet of the Estonian SSR
- Estonian SSR (1940–1941, 1944–1990); Estonia (1990–1992)
- Emblem of the Estonian SSR

Type
- Type: Supreme Soviet

History
- Established: 1940 (First Soviet occupation); 1944 (1947) (Second Soviet occupation)
- Disbanded: 1941 (German occupation); 1992
- Preceded by: Riigikogu
- Succeeded by: Riigikogu

Elections
- Voting system: Direct show elections (1940–1985); Direct single transferable vote (1990)
- Last election: 1990

Meeting place
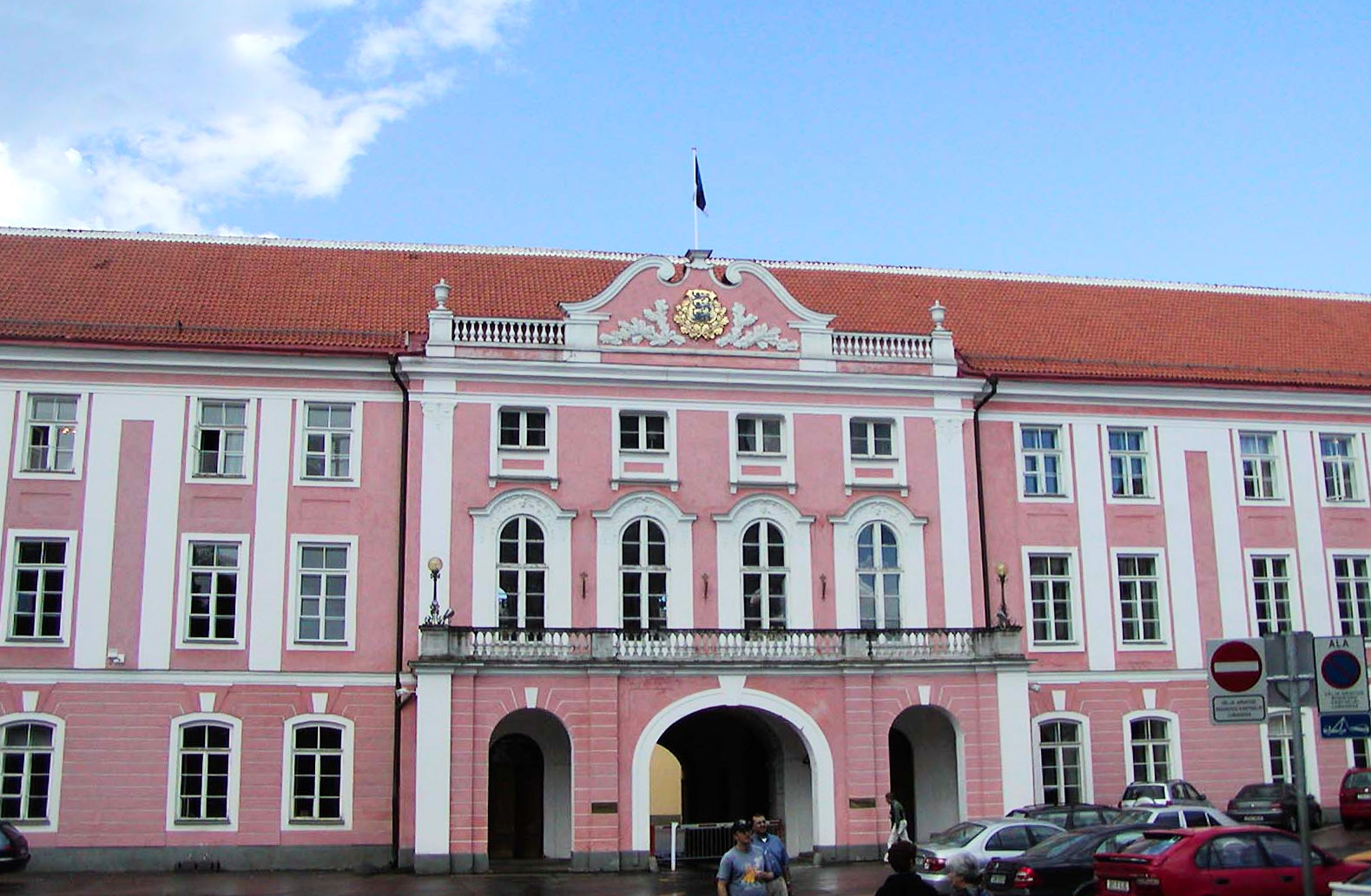
- Toompea Castle in Tallinn, Estonia

The Supreme Soviet of the Estonian SSR (Estonian: Eesti NSV Ülemnõukogu) was the highest organ of state authority of the Estonian SSR. Before 1988, the Supreme Soviet had no meaningful political role. After its first democratic elections on 18 March 1990, the institution was renamed the Supreme Council of the Republic of Estonia on 8 May 1990. (Note: The Estonian name Ülemnõukogu remained the same, but its translation into English is usually changed from this point from "Supreme Soviet" to "Supreme Council", together with the change of the official name of the country.)

== Organization ==
The structure and formal functions of the Supreme Soviet of the Estonian SSR were copied from the Supreme Soviet of the Soviet Union. The sessions of the Supreme Soviet lasted only several days twice a year and decisions were made unanimously and without much discussion. Supreme Soviet elections were held after every four years until 1978 and were held every five years in 1978–1985. The Supreme Soviet gathered in Tallinn, in the Toompea Castle building which now houses the Riigikogu (as it did in interwar Estonia).

== Chairmen of the Supreme Soviet ==
Portrait	Chairman	From	To
	Voldemar Sassi	25 August 1940	1941
	August Kründel	5 March 1947	14 January 1953
	Joosep Saat	5 April 1955	23 April 1959
	Harald Ilves	23 April 1959	18 April 1963
	Vaino Väljas	18 April 1963	20 April 1967
	Arnold Koop	20 April 1967	18 December 1968
	Ilmar Vahe	18 December 1968	4 July 1975
	Johannes Lott	4 July 1975	13 December 1978
	Jüri Suurhans	13 December 1978	5 July 1982
	Matti Pedak	5 July 1982	27 March 1985
	Valde Roosmaa	27 March 1985	18 May 1989
	Enn-Arno Sillari	18 May 1989	28 March 1990
	Ülo Nugis	29 March 1990	6 October 1992

== Presidents of the Presidium of the Supreme Soviet ==
The presidium was the permanent body of the Supreme Soviet. Its chairman was the de jure head of state of Estonian SSR.

The chairmen of the presidium were:

President	From	To	Notes
Johannes Vares (1890–1946)	25 August 1940	29 November 1946	First President of the Presidium of the Supreme Soviet
Eduard Päll (1903–1989)	5 March 1947	4 July 1950	
August Jakobson (1904–1963)	4 July 1950	4 February 1958	
Johan Eichfeld (1893–1989)	4 February 1958	12 October 1961	
Aleksei Müürisepp (1902–1970)	12 October 1961	7 October 1970	
Artur Vader (1920–1978)	22 December 1970	25 May 1978	
Johannes Käbin (1905–1999)	26 July 1978	8 April 1983	
Arnold Rüütel (1928–2024)	8 April 1983	28 March 1990	Last President of the Presidium of the Supreme Soviet

== Convocations ==
- 1st convocation (1940–1946)
- 2nd convocation (1947–1950)
- 3rd convocation (1951–1954)
- 4th convocation (1955–1959)
- 5th convocation (1959–1962)
- 6th convocation (1963–1966)
- 7th convocation (1967–1970)
- 8th convocation (1971–1975)
- 9th convocation (1975–1979)
- 10th convocation (1980–1984)
- 11th convocation (1985–1990)
- 12th convocation (1990–1992)

== See also ==
- Estonian Sovereignty Declaration
- Supreme Soviet of the Soviet Union
- Riigikogu
