= 1990 Estonian Supreme Soviet election =

- 18 March 1990

All 105 seats in the Supreme Soviet 53 seats needed for a majority
- Turnout: 78.24%
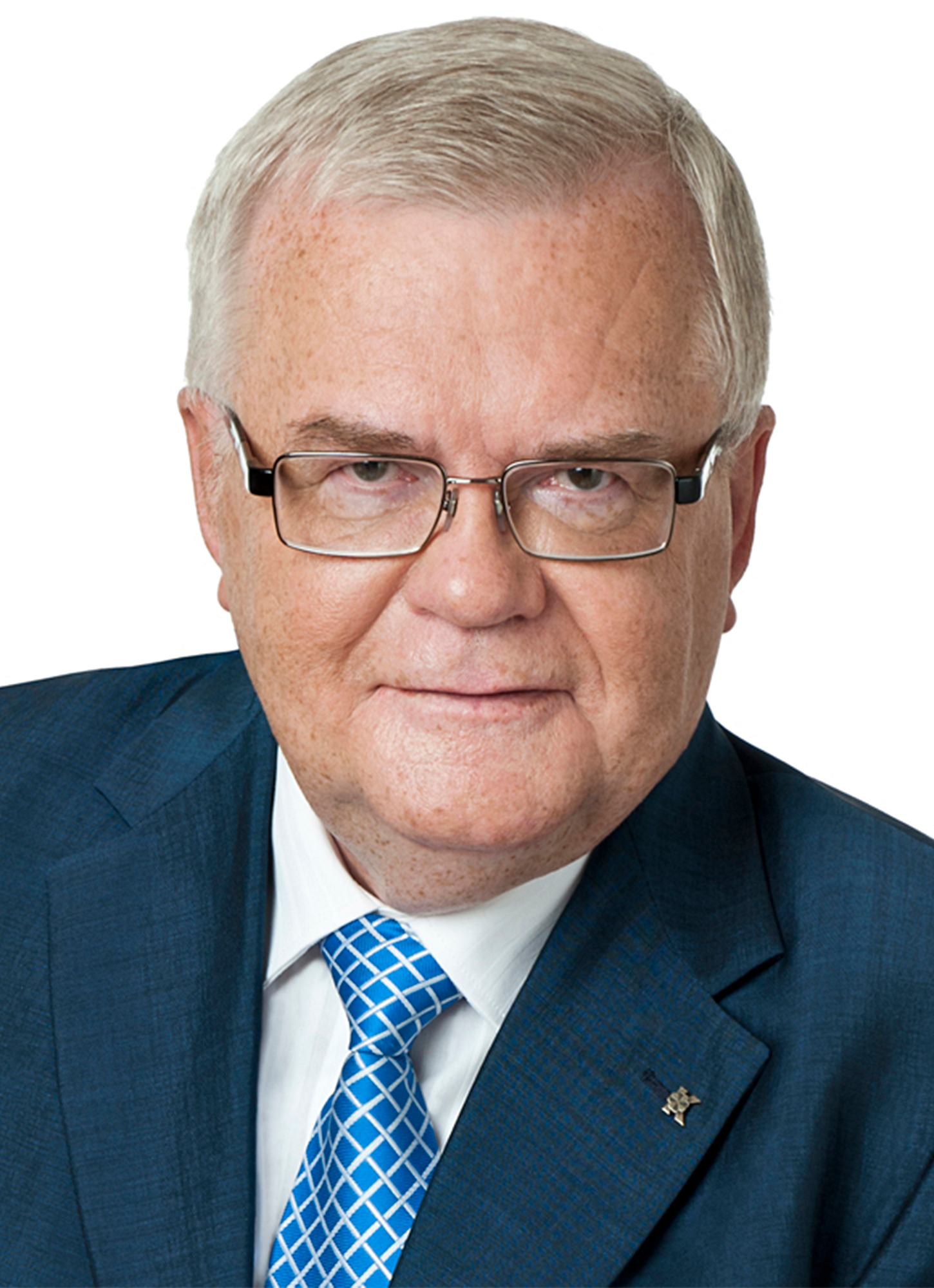

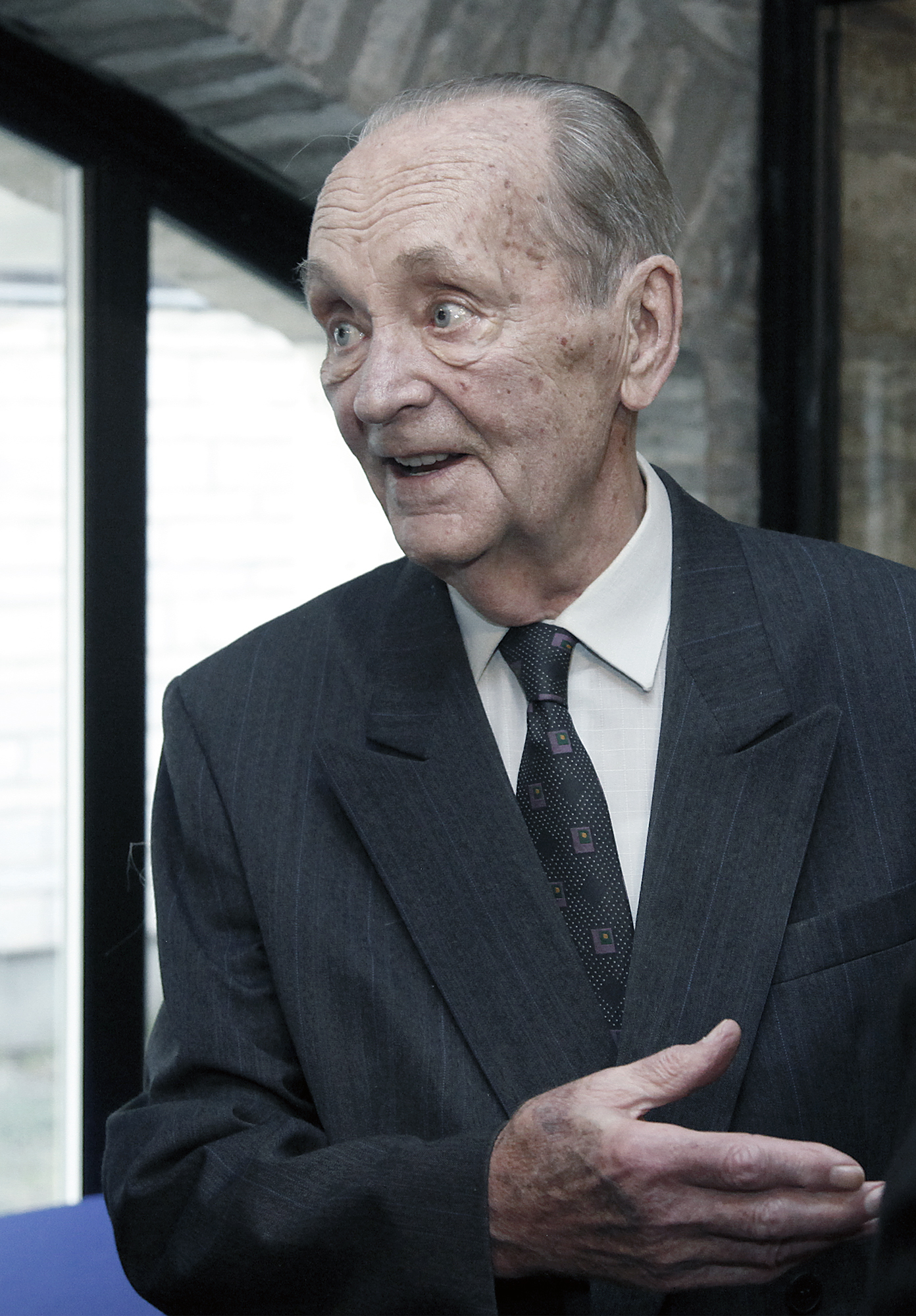

	Majority party	Minority party	Third party
Leader	Edgar Savisaar	Vaino Väljas
Party	Popular Front	Communist–Free Estonia	Joint Soviet of Work Collectives
Seats won	43	25	25
Seat change	New	▼180	New
Chairman of the Presidium of the Supreme Soviet before election
Arnold Rüütel
EKP
Chairman of the Supreme Council after election
Arnold Rüütel
EKP

Elections to the Supreme Soviet were held in the Estonian SSR on 18 March 1990. Altogether 392 candidates ran for the Soviet-style legislature's 105 seats, of which four were pre-allocated to the military districts of the Soviet Army. The pro-independence Popular Front won the plurality (43 seats). The coalition of the reformed Estonian communists, who favored independence but close relations with the USSR and were supported by Indrek Toome who was running under the Free Estonia banner, won 27 seats. The anti-independence, pro-Moscow "Joint Soviet of Work Collectives", representing mostly the ethnic Russian immigrant minority in Estonia, won 25 seats. During its first session, the new legislature elected the former Communist Party member Arnold Rüütel as its chairman, allowing him to stay as the nominal leader of Estonia (real powers mostly lay with the prime minister).

The elected parliament made some of the most important decisions in the modern Estonian history, such as the on 30 March 1990 declaration of a period of transition to restore full independence from the Soviet Union, and the 20 August 1991 declaration to confirm the restoration of the country's full independence.

== Electoral system ==
Members of the Supreme Soviet were elected in 42 single-member or multi-member constituencies. In the former constituencies deputies were elected by first-past-the-post vote, while in the latter deputies were elected by single transferable vote.

The local elections three months earlier, in December 1989, were also held under STV, and served as a dress rehearsal with the electoral law finally enacted on 4 December 1989.

The choice of STV was the result of a debate on voting systems led by the influential Estonian political scientist and émigré Rein Taagepera, who penned articles in Edasi in 1988, published Seats and Votes in 1989, and gave conferences on the topic. STV was not, however, Taagepera's own preference, but was rather the result of a consensus driven by Peet Kask between the outgoing Communist local officials, who sought a system that favored their popular names over their unpopular party brand, and the principle of proportional representation favored by the new parties.

== Apportionment ==
The seats allocated were distributed as follows:

Type of district	Number	Total members	Districts
5-seat districts	3	15	1 – Tallinn; 9 – Kohtla-Järve; 36 – Rakvere
4-seat districts	5	20	5 – Tallinn; 6 – Tallinn; 27 – Jõgeva; 41 – Viljandi; 42 – Võru
3-seat districts	13	39	2, 7, 8 – Tallinn; 21, 22 – Tartu; 23 – Haapsalu; 25 – Harju; 28 – Kingissep; 29 – Kohtla-Järve; 30 – Paide; 31 – Polva; 37 – Rapla; 40 – Valga
2-seat districts	6	12	4 – Tallinn; 15 – Pärnu; 24 – Harju; 26 – Hiiumaa; 38 – Tartu; 39 – Tartu
1-seat districts	15	15	3 – Tallinn; 10, 11, 12, 13, 14 – Narva; 16, 17 – Pärnu; 18, 19, 20 – Sillamäe; 32, 33, 34, 35 – Pärnu
Soviet Armed Forces	4	4	
Total	46	105	

List of districts
- 1 – Tallinn (5)
- 2 – Tallinn (3)
- 3 – Tallinn (1)
- 4 – Tallinn (2)
- 5 – Tallinn (4)
- 6 – Tallinn (4)
- 7 – Tallinn (3)
- 8 – Tallinn (3)
- 9 – Kohtla-Järve (5)
- 10 – Narva (1)
- 11 – Narva (1)
- 12 – Narva (1)
- 13 – Narva (1)
- 14 – Narva (1)
- 15 – Pärnu (2)
- 16 – Pärnu (1)
- 17 – Pärnu (1)
- 18 – Sillamäe (1)
- 19 – Sillamäe (1)
- 20 – Sillamäe (1)
- 21 – Tartu (3)
- 22 – Tartu (3)
- 23 – Haapsalu (3)
- 24 – Harju (2)
- 25 – Harju (3)
- 26 – Hiiumaa (2)
- 27 – Jõgeva (4)
- 28 – Kingissep (3)
- 29 – Kohtla-Järve (3)
- 30 – Paide (3)
- 31 – Polva (3)
- 32 – Pärnu (1)
- 33 – Pärnu (1)
- 34 – Pärnu (1)
- 35 – Pärnu (1)
- 36 – Rakvere (5)
- 37 – Rapla (3)
- 38 – Tartu (2)
- 39 – Tartu (2)
- 40 – Valga (3)
- 41 – Viljandi (4)
- 42 – Võru (4)

== Results ==
Party	Votes	%	Seats
Popular Front of Estonia			43
Communist Party of Estonia–Free Estonia			27
Joint Soviet of Work Collectives			25
Independents			10
Total			105
Total votes	911,203	–	
Registered voters/turnout	1,164,603	78.24	
Source: Nohlen & Stöver, VVK

== See also ==
- List of members of the Supreme Council of the Republic of Estonia, 1990–1992
