= Order of the National Coat of Arms =

Award

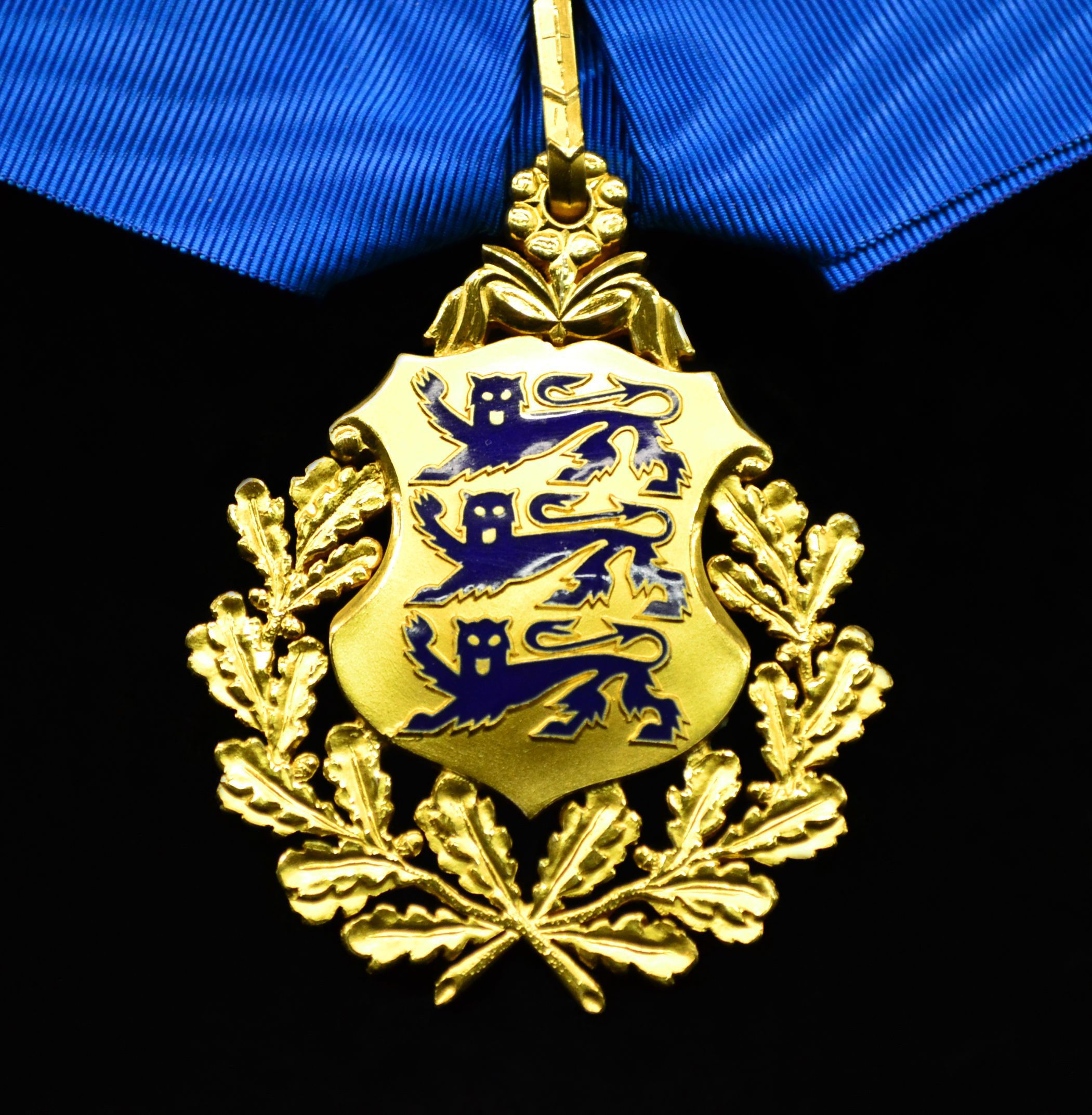
- 2nd Class Badge of the Order of the National Coat of Arms
- Type: Six class order
- Awarded for: Special services rendered to the state
- Country: Estonia
- Eligibility: Estonian citizens only
- Status: Currently awarded
- Established: 7 October 1936
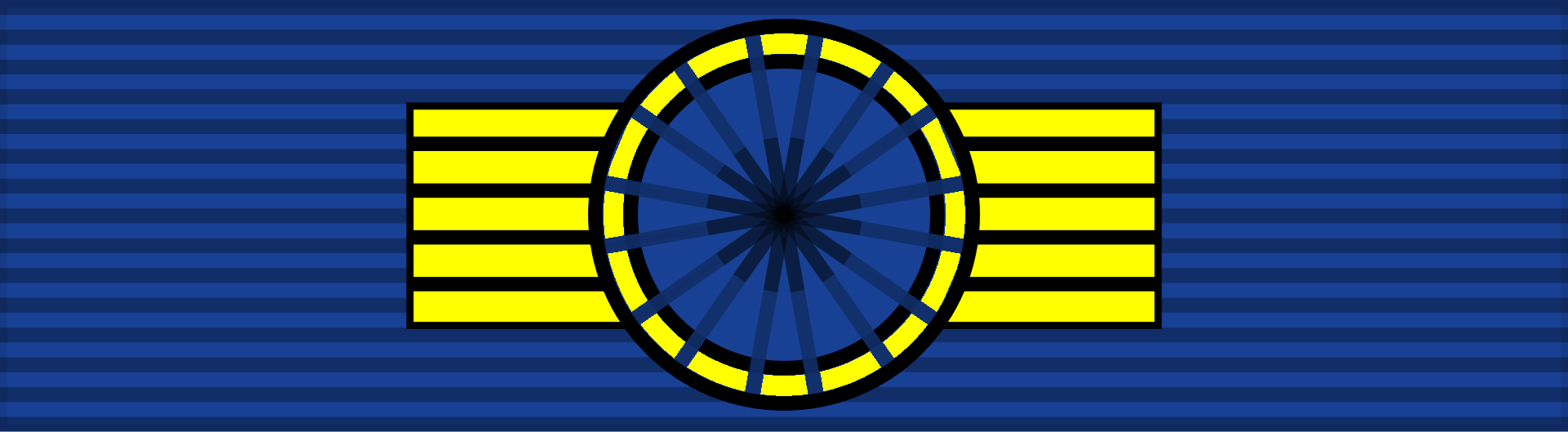
- Collar 1st Class 2nd Class 3rd Class 4th Class 5th Class Ribbon bars of the Order of the National Coat of Arms

Precedence
- Next (higher): None
- Equivalent: Cross of Liberty
- Next (lower): Order of the Cross of Terra Mariana

The Order of the National Coat of Arms (Estonian: Riigivapi teenetemärk, French: Ordre du Blason National) was instituted by Konstantin Päts on 7 October 1936, to commemorate 24 February 1918, the day on which Estonian independence was declared. The Order of the National Coat of Arms is bestowed only on Estonian citizens, as the highest decoration for services rendered to the state.

== Classes ==
The Order of the National Coat of Arms comprises six classes:

- One special class – the Collar of the Order of the National Coat of Arms;
- Five ordinary classes – 1st, 2nd, 3rd, 4th and 5th class.

The greater national coat of arms is depicted on all the decorations of all the classes of the Order of the National Coat of Arms, it is gold-plated on both sides, and bears on its reverse the embossed date "24. II 1918". The colour tone of the blue moiré ribbons belonging to the decorations of all the classes of the Order of the National Coat of Arms is determined according to the international PANTONE colour table as 285 C.

== Collar ==
The collar of the Order of the National Coat of Arms is the insignia of the office of the President of Estonia, the collar was unique in the order. However, during the Soviet occupation the original collar made in 1936 had been carried away by the occupying forces to the Armoury (Оружейная палата, Oruzhejjnaja palata) of the Moscow Kremlin as a trophy and the collar has never returned to Estonia.

In 2008, a newly made copy of the original collar was again worn by the President of Estonia as the insignia of office. In 2018 Lyudmila Gavrilova, head of phaleristics department at the Moscow Armoury, said that there are no plans to move any of the current exhibits anywhere.

== Special sash ==
Special sash (Riigivapi teenetemärgi erisuurpael) was received by Konstantin Päts after he acceded to the post of the President of the Republic.

== Gallery ==
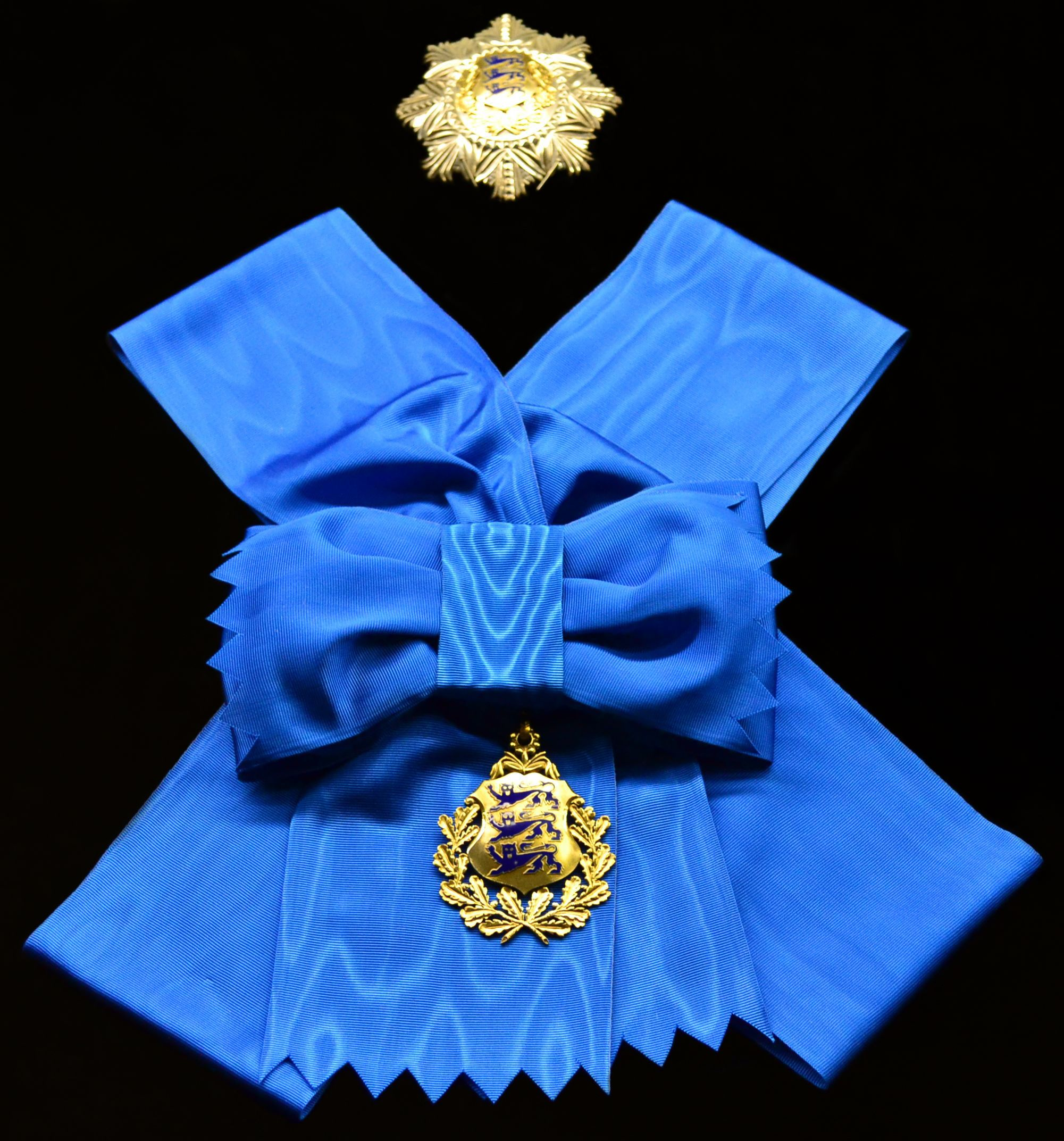
First-class badge, sash and star

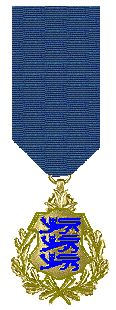
Fifth-class medal

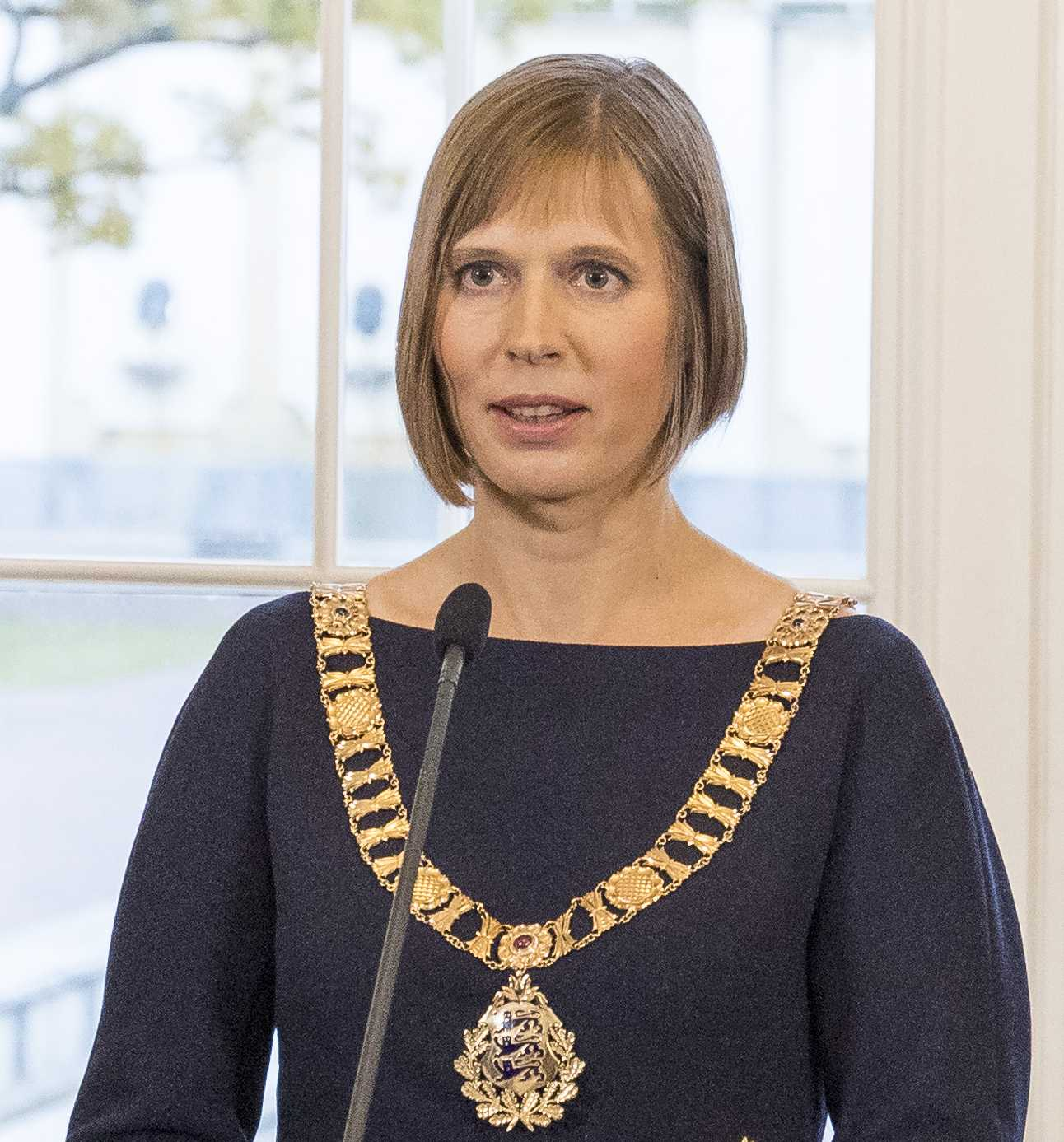
The collar of the order as worn by president Kersti Kaljulaid in 2016.

== See also ==
- Category:Recipients of the Order of the National Coat of Arms
- Estonian State Decorations
- Coat of Arms of Estonia
- State decoration
