= Members of the 7th Riigikogu =

This is a list of the members of the Riigikogu, following the 1992 election.

== Election results ==
Results:

| List | Votes | % | Seats |
|---|---|---|---|
| Alliance Isamaa | 100 828 | 22.00% | 29 |
| Alliance Kindel Kodu | 62 329 | 13.60% | 17 |
| Alliance Rahvarinne | 56 124 | 12.25% | 15 |
| Alliance Mõõdukad | 44 577 | 9.73% | 12 |
| Estonian National Independence Party (ERSP) | 40 260 | 8.79% | 10 |
| Alliance Independent Royalist Party of Estonia | 32 638 | 7.12% | 8 |
| Alliance Eesti Kodanik | 31 553 | 6.89% | 8 |
| Alliance Rohelised | 12 009 | 2.62% | 1 (person mandate) |
| Eesti Ettevõtjate Erakond | 10 946 | 2.39% | 1 (person mandate) |

== Members ==
Members were:

1. Juhan Aare
2. Jüri Adams
3. Priit Aimla
4. Sulev Alajõe
5. Toomas Alatalu
6. Olav Anton
7. Tiit Arge
8. Rein Arjukese
9. Lembit Arro
10. Tiina Benno
11. Jaanus Betlem
12. Endel Eero
13. Lauri Einer
14. Peeter Ello
15. Ants Erm
16. Ignar Fjuk
17. Epp Haabsaar
18. Illar Hallaste
19. Vootele Hansen
20. Arvo Haug
21. Rein Hanson
22. Andres Heinapuu
23. Rein Helme
24. Jaak Herodes
25. Mati Hint
26. Liia Hänni
27. Karin Jaani
28. Toivo Jullinen
29. Arvo Junti
30. Tõnu Juul
31. Rein Järlik
32. Kalle Jürgenson
33. Toivo Jürgenson
34. Vambo Kaal
35. Aivar Kala
36. Kaido Kama
37. Indrek Kannik
38. Jaan Kaplinski
39. Tunne Kelam
40. Avo Kiir
41. Valve Kirsipuu
42. Rein Kikerpill
43. Krista Kilvet
44. Heiki Kranich
45. Jaan Kross
46. Kalev Kukk
47. Tõnu-Reid Kukk
48. Kalle Kulbok
49. Mihkel Kraav
50. Merle Krigul
51. Tõnu Kõrda
52. Tiit Käbin
53. Ants Käärma
54. Lembit Küüts
55. Ülo Laanoja
56. Mart Laar
57. Marju Lauristin
58. Jaan Leetsaar
59. Daimar Liiv
60. Katrin Linde
61. Peeter Lorents
62. Jüri Luik
63. Ants-Enno Lõhmus
64. Tiit Made
65. Uno Mereste
66. Paul-Olev Mõtsküla
67. Ilmar Mändmets
68. Aap Neljas
69. Eiki Nestor
70. Viktor Niitsoo
71. Mart-Olav Niklus
72. Ülo Nugis
73. Mart Nutt
74. Ardo Ojasalu
75. Kristiina Ojuland
76. Siiri Oviir
77. Ralf R. Parve
78. Vambola Põder
79. Georg Erich Põld
80. Kalju Põldvere
81. Eve Pärnaste
82. Mihkel Pärnoja
83. Ilmar Pärtelpoeg
84. Matti Päts
85. Kalev Raave
86. Jaanus Raidal
87. Ivar Raig
88. Kuno Raude
89. Heiki Raudla
90. K. Jaak Roosaare
91. Vardo Rumessen
92. Paul-Eerik Rummo
93. Jüri Rätsep
94. Vello Saatpalu
95. Edgar Savisaar
96. Tiit Sinissaar
97. Riivo Sinijärv
98. Arvo Sirendi
99. Edgar Spriit
100. Aime Sügis
101. Aldo Tamm
102. Eino Tamm
103. Sergei Zonov
104. Andres Tarand
105. Enn Tarto
106. Kirill Teiter
107. Tõnu Tepandi
108. Jüri Toomepuu
109. Olli Toomik
110. Liina Tõnisson
111. Toivo Uustalo
112. Lauri Vahtre
113. Arvo Vallikivi
114. Andra Veidemann
115. Rein Veidemann
116. Trivimi Velliste
117. Andrus Villem
118. Heido Vitsur
119. Ülo Vooglaid
120. Raoul Üksvärav
