= Riigikogu electoral district no. 9 (1992–1995) =

Electoral district of Estonia

Electoral district no. 9
- Valimisringkond nr 9
- Former Electoral District for the Riigikogu
- County: Jõgeva; Viljandi

Former Electoral District
- Created: 1992
- Abolished: 1995
- Seats: 11 (1992–1995)
- Replaced by: District no. 7; District no. 8

Electoral district no. 9 (Estonian: Valimisringkond nr 9) was one of the multi-member electoral districts of the Riigikogu, the national legislature of Estonia. The district was established in 1992 when the Riigikogu was re-established following Estonia's independence from the Soviet Union. It was abolished in 1995. It was conterminous with the counties of Jõgeva and Viljandi.

== Election results ==
=== Detailed ===
Party has received at least 5% of the vote nationally and is entitled to compete for district seats.

==== 1992 ====
Results of the 1992 parliamentary election held on 20 September 1992:

Party		Votes per county			Total Votes	%	Seats			
Party		Jõgeva	Vil- jandi	Expat- riates	Total Votes	%	Per.	Dis.	Com.	Tot.
Pro Patria	I	5,296	8,589	346	14,231	32.95%	1	2	1	4
Safe Home	KK	3,034	4,815	11	7,860	18.20%	0	2	1	3
Popular Front of Estonia	R	2,512	3,931	11	6,454	14.95%	0	1	0	1
Independent Kings	SK	1,938	3,563	2	5,503	12.74%	1	0	0	1
Moderate	M	321	1,429	6	1,756	4.07%	0	0	0	0
Farmers' Assembly		1,068	641	11	1,720	3.98%	0	0	0	0
Estonian National Independence Party	ERSP	440	1,061	124	1,625	3.76%	0	0	0	0
Estonian Union of Pensioners	EPL	309	774	1	1,084	2.51%	0	0	0	0
Estonian Citizen	EK	331	665	0	996	2.31%	0	0	0	0
Handicapped Union		53	631	0	684	1.58%	0	0	0	0
Estonian Entrepreneurs' Party	EEE	76	282	0	358	0.83%	0	0	0	0
Left Option	V	117	185	0	302	0.70%	0	0	0	0
Greens	R	110	119	2	231	0.53%	0	0	0	0
National Party of the Illegally Repressed	ÕRRE	51	124	0	175	0.41%	0	0	0	0
Leonhard Saluveer (Independent)		41	84	0	125	0.29%	0	0	0	0
Enn Oja (Independent)		37	44	0	81	0.19%	0	0	0	0
Valid votes		15,734	26,937	514	43,185	100.00%	2	5	2	9
Rejected votes		449	464	0	913	2.07%				
Total polled		16,183	27,401	514	44,098	63.00%				
Registered electors		26,318	43,157	523	69,998					
Turnout		61.49%	63.49%	98.28%	63.00%					

The following candidates were elected:

- Personal mandates - Priit Aimla (SK), 4,221 votes; and Matti Päts (I), 9,618 votes.
- District mandates - Tõnu Juul (I), 1,399 votes; Ilmar Mändmets (KK), 2,747 votes; Kalev Raave (KK), 1,891 votes; Jüri Rätsep (R), 2,017 votes; and Heiki Raudla (I), 880 votes.
- Compensatory mandates - Mart Nutt (I), 543 votes; and Raoul Üksvärav (KK), 1,063 votes.
