= Riigikogu electoral district no. 3 (1992–1995) =

Former electoral district in Estonia

Electoral district no. 3
- Valimisringkond nr 3
- Former Electoral District for the Riigikogu
- Municipality: Tallinn
- County: Harju

Former Electoral District
- Created: 1992
- Abolished: 1995
- Seats: 7 (1992–1995)

Electoral district no. 3 (Estonian: Valimisringkond nr 3) was one of the multi-member electoral districts of the Riigikogu, the national legislature of Estonia. The district was established in 1992 when the Riigikogu was re-established following Estonia's independence from the Soviet Union. It was abolished in 1995. It covered west Tallinn.

== Election results ==
=== Detailed ===
Party has received at least 5% of the vote nationally and is entitled to compete for district seats.

==== 1992 ====
Results of the 1992 parliamentary election held on 20 September 1992:

Party		Votes		Total Votes	%	Seats			
Party		West Tallinn	Expat- riates	Total Votes	%	Per.	Dis.	Com.	Tot.
Moderate	M	9,825	36	9,861	28.11%	1	0	1	2
Pro Patria	I	7,791	305	8,096	23.08%	1	0	3	4
Safe Home	KK	4,288	14	4,302	12.26%	0	0	1	1
Popular Front of Estonia	R	3,285	23	3,308	9.43%	0	0	1	1
Estonian Citizen	EK	3,166	58	3,224	9.19%	0	0	0	0
Estonian National Independence Party	ERSP	1,744	109	1,853	5.28%	0	0	0	0
Independent Kings	SK	1,791	12	1,803	5.14%	0	0	0	0
Estonian Union of Pensioners	EPL	1,144	4	1,148	3.27%	0	0	0	0
Estonian Entrepreneurs' Party	EEE	639	1	640	1.82%	0	0	0	0
Greens	R	348	10	358	1.02%	0	0	0	0
National Party of the Illegally Repressed	ÕRRE	169	11	180	0.51%	0	0	0	0
Natural Law Party		111	0	111	0.32%	0	0	0	0
Heino Tohver (Independent)		93	1	94	0.27%	0	0	0	0
The Democrats		55	5	60	0.17%	0	0	0	0
Heino Hansen (Independent)		41	1	42	0.12%	0	0	0	0
Valid votes		34,490	590	35,080	100.00%	2	0	6	8
Rejected votes		678	0	678	1.90%				
Total polled		35,168	590	35,758	73.01%				
Registered electors		48,378	602	48,980					
Turnout		72.69%	98.01%	73.01%					

The following candidates were elected:

- Personal mandates - Valve Kirsipuu (M), 9,051 votes; and Ülo Nugis (I), 5,330 votes.
- Compensatory mandates - Andres Heinapuu (I), 97 votes; Jüri Luik (I), 2,293 votes; Aap Neljas (I), 121 votes; Vello Saatpalu (M), 455 votes; Riivo Sinijärv (KK), 1,640 votes; and Andra Veidemann (R), 562 votes.
