= Riigikogu electoral district no. 1 (1992–1995) =

Electoral district of Estonia

Electoral district no. 1
- Valimisringkond nr 1
- Former Electoral District for the Riigikogu
- Municipality: Tallinn
- County: Harju

Former Electoral District
- Created: 1992
- Abolished: 1995
- Seats: 6 (1992–1995)

Electoral district no. 1 (Estonian: Valimisringkond nr 1) was one of the multi-member electoral districts of the Riigikogu, the national legislature of Estonia. The district was established in 1992 when the Riigikogu was re-established following Estonia's independence from the Soviet Union. It was abolished in 1995. It covered south Tallinn.

== Election results ==
=== Detailed ===
Party has received at least 5% of the vote nationally and is entitled to compete for district seats.

==== 1992 ====
Results of the 1992 parliamentary election held on 20 September 1992:

Party		Votes		Total Votes	%	Seats			
Party		South Tallinn	Expat- riates	Total Votes	%	Per.	Dis.	Com.	Tot.
Pro Patria	I	8,222	513	8,735	27.69%	1	0	3	4
Popular Front of Estonia	R	3,853	41	3,894	12.34%	0	0	1	1
Moderate	M	3,574	166	3,740	11.85%	0	0	2	2
Estonian National Independence Party	ERSP	2,859	598	3,457	10.96%	0	0	1	1
Safe Home	KK	2,300	34	2,334	7.40%	0	0	1	1
Mercy		1,846	6	1,852	5.87%	0	0	0	0
Estonian Citizen	EK	1,457	9	1,466	4.65%	0	0	1	1
Estonian Union of Pensioners	EPL	1,102	5	1,107	3.51%	0	0	0	0
Independent Kings	SK	1,089	8	1,097	3.48%	0	0	0	0
Ülo Siinmaa (Independent)		835	0	835	2.65%	0	0	0	0
Handicapped Union		762	10	772	2.45%	0	0	0	0
Estonian Entrepreneurs' Party	EEE	570	6	576	1.83%	0	0	0	0
Greens	R	501	17	518	1.64%	0	0	0	0
Left Option	V	377	1	378	1.20%	0	0	0	0
Heikki Tann (Independent)		288	2	290	0.92%	0	0	0	0
National Party of the Illegally Repressed	ÕRRE	200	12	212	0.67%	0	0	0	0
Harri Roop (Independent)		111	1	112	0.35%	0	0	0	0
Natural Law Party		102	1	103	0.33%	0	0	0	0
The Democrats		68	4	72	0.23%	0	0	0	0
Valid votes		30,116	1,434	31,550	100.00%	1	0	9	10
Rejected votes		550	0	550	1.71%				
Total polled		30,666	1,434	32,100	73.74%				
Registered electors		42,053	1,478	43,531					
Turnout		72.92%	97.02%	73.74%					

The following candidates were elected:

- Personal mandates - Tiit Käbin (I), 6,427 votes.
- Compensatory mandates - Tiit Arge (I), 280 votes; Lauri Einer (I), 195 votes; Indrek Kannik (I), 1,509 votes; Tunne Kelam (ERSP), 2,350 votes; Jaan Kross (M), 2,985 votes; Ülo Laanoja (M), 341 votes; Katrin Linde (EK), 985 votes; Tõnu Tepandi (KK), 563 votes; and Liina Tõnisson (R), 1,737 votes.
