= Riigikogu electoral district no. 8 (1992–1995) =

Electoral district of Estonia

Electoral district no. 8
- Valimisringkond nr 8
- Former Electoral District for the Riigikogu
- County: Järva; Lääne-Viru

Former Electoral District
- Created: 1992
- Abolished: 1995
- Seats: 10 (1992–1995)
- Replaced by: District no. 6; District no. 7

Electoral district no. 8 (Estonian: Valimisringkond nr 8) was one of the multi-member electoral districts of the Riigikogu, the national legislature of Estonia. The district was established in 1992 when the Riigikogu was re-established following Estonia's independence from the Soviet Union. It was abolished in 1995. It was conterminous with the counties of Järva and Lääne-Viru.

== Election results ==
=== Detailed ===
Party has received at least 5% of the vote nationally and is entitled to compete for district seats.

==== 1992 ====
Results of the 1992 parliamentary election held on 20 September 1992:

Party		Votes per county			Total Votes	%	Seats			
Party		Järva	Lääne- Viru	Expat- riates	Total Votes	%	Per.	Dis.	Com.	Tot.
Safe Home	KK	5,967	7,638	20	13,625	30.91%	1	2	0	3
Pro Patria	I	2,664	4,383	371	7,418	16.83%	0	1	0	1
Popular Front of Estonia	R	2,293	4,890	31	7,214	16.36%	1	0	0	1
Estonian Entrepreneurs' Party	EEE	2,384	2,285	9	4,678	10.61%	1	0	0	1
Moderate	M	482	1,978	19	2,479	5.62%	0	0	0	0
Independent Kings	SK	1,083	1,326	8	2,417	5.48%	0	0	1	1
Estonian National Independence Party	ERSP	865	1,334	165	2,364	5.36%	0	0	1	1
Farmers' Assembly		934	632	10	1,576	3.57%	0	0	0	0
Estonian Union of Pensioners	EPL	424	518	6	948	2.15%	0	0	0	0
Estonian Citizen	EK	255	242	1	498	1.13%	0	0	0	0
Left Option	V	217	164	0	381	0.86%	0	0	0	0
Greens	R	101	237	3	341	0.77%	0	0	0	0
Handicapped Union		15	110	0	125	0.28%	0	0	0	0
The Democrats		5	14	1	20	0.05%	0	0	0	0
Valid votes		17,689	25,751	644	44,084	100.00%	3	3	2	8
Rejected votes		328	420	0	748	1.67%				
Total polled		18,017	26,171	644	44,832	63.88%				
Registered electors		27,787	41,741	655	70,183					
Turnout		64.84%	62.70%	98.32%	63.88%					

The following candidates were elected:

- Personal mandates - Juhan Aare (KK), 9,341 votes; Tiit Made (EEE), 4,678 votes; and Edgar Savisaar (R), 4,678 votes.
- District mandates - Illar Hallaste (I), 4,178 votes; Ants Käärma (KK), 3,725 votes; and Kuno Raude (KK), 188 votes.
- Compensatory mandates - Rein Arjukese (ERSP), 659 votes; and Ralf Parve (SK), 2,300 votes.
