= Riigikogu electoral district no. 2 (1992–1995) =

Electoral district of Estonia

Electoral district no. 2
- Valimisringkond nr 2
- Former Electoral District for the Riigikogu
- Municipality: Tallinn
- County: Harju

Former Electoral District
- Created: 1992
- Abolished: 1995
- Seats: 5 (1992–1995)

Electoral district no. 2 (Estonian: Valimisringkond nr 2) was one of the multi-member electoral districts of the Riigikogu, the national legislature of Estonia. The district was established in 1992 when the Riigikogu was re-established following Estonia's independence from the Soviet Union. It was abolished in 1995. It covered north Tallinn.

== Election results ==
=== Detailed ===
Party has received at least 5% of the vote nationally and is entitled to compete for district seats.

==== 1992 ====
Results of the 1992 parliamentary election held on 20 September 1992:

Party		Votes		Total Votes	%	Seats			
Party		North Tallinn	Expat- riates	Total Votes	%	Per.	Dis.	Com.	Tot.
Pro Patria	I	4,472	295	4,767	21.05%	0	1	1	2
Estonian National Independence Party	ERSP	4,278	197	4,475	19.77%	0	0	1	1
Popular Front of Estonia	R	4,188	27	4,215	18.62%	0	0	1	1
Safe Home	KK	2,999	39	3,038	13.42%	0	0	3	3
Moderate	M	1,807	22	1,829	8.08%	0	0	0	0
Estonian Union of Pensioners	EPL	1,188	0	1,188	5.25%	0	0	0	0
Independent Kings	SK	982	7	989	4.37%	0	0	0	0
Estonian Citizen	EK	793	4	797	3.52%	0	0	0	0
Greens	R	467	7	474	2.09%	0	0	0	0
Estonian Entrepreneurs' Party	EEE	429	6	435	1.92%	0	0	0	0
Left Option	V	349	0	349	1.54%	0	0	0	0
The Democrats		84	1	85	0.38%	0	0	0	0
Valid votes		22,036	605	22,641	100.00%	0	1	6	7
Rejected votes		513	0	513	2.22%				
Total polled		22,549	605	23,154	72.16%				
Registered electors		31,467	619	32,086					
Turnout		71.66%	97.74%	72.16%					

The following candidates were elected:

- District mandates - Arvo Vallikivi (I), 2,896 votes.
- Compensatory mandates - Ants Erm (ERSP), 642 votes; Toivo Jürgenson (I), 581 votes; Tõnu-Reid Kukk (KK), 427 votes; Ants-Enno Lõhmus (R), 270 votes; Edgar Spriit (KK), 266 votes; and Heido Vitsur (KK), 1,627 votes.
