= Riigikogu electoral district no. 4 (1992–1995) =

Electoral district of Estonia

Electoral district no. 4
- Valimisringkond nr 4
- Former Electoral District for the Riigikogu
- Municipality: Tallinn
- County: Harju

Former Electoral District
- Created: 1992
- Abolished: 1995
- Seats: 6 (1992–1995)

Electoral district no. 4 (Estonian: Valimisringkond nr 4) was one of the multi-member electoral districts of the Riigikogu, the national legislature of Estonia. The district was established in 1992 when the Riigikogu was re-established following Estonia's independence from the Soviet Union. It was abolished in 1995. It covered east Tallinn.

== Election results ==
=== Detailed ===
Party has received at least 5% of the vote nationally and is entitled to compete for district seats.

==== 1992 ====
Results of the 1992 parliamentary election held on 20 September 1992:

Party		Votes		Total Votes	%	Seats			
Party		East Tallinn	Expat- riates	Total Votes	%	Per.	Dis.	Com.	Tot.
Pro Patria	I	6,551	414	6,965	22.71%	1	0	1	2
Popular Front of Estonia	R	4,870	23	4,893	15.95%	0	0	2	2
Moderate	M	3,603	41	3,644	11.88%	0	0	1	1
Estonian National Independence Party	ERSP	3,198	111	3,309	10.79%	0	0	0	0
Safe Home	KK	3,022	19	3,041	9.92%	0	0	0	0
Estonian Union of Pensioners	EPL	2,630	14	2,644	8.62%	0	0	0	0
Independent Kings	SK	1,723	10	1,733	5.65%	0	0	0	0
Farmers' Assembly		1,175	7	1,182	3.85%	0	0	0	0
Estonian Citizen	EK	1,159	2	1,161	3.79%	0	0	1	1
Estonian Entrepreneurs' Party	EEE	586	4	590	1.92%	0	0	0	0
Greens	R	488	7	495	1.61%	0	0	0	0
Left Option	V	356	0	356	1.16%	0	0	0	0
Lembit Kask (Independent)		217	0	217	0.71%	0	0	0	0
Natural Law Party		152	2	154	0.50%	0	0	0	0
Sirje Terep (Independent)		120	0	120	0.39%	0	0	0	0
The Democrats		103	3	106	0.35%	0	0	0	0
Armin Voimann (Independent)		59	0	59	0.19%	0	0	0	0
Valid votes		30,012	657	30,669	100.00%	1	0	5	6
Rejected votes		758	0	758	2.41%				
Total polled		30,770	657	31,427	70.35%				
Registered electors		44,006	665	44,671					
Turnout		69.92%	98.80%	70.35%					

The following candidates were elected:

- Personal mandates - Paul-Eerik Rummo (I), 5,290 votes.
- Compensatory mandates - Tiina Benno (EK), 458 votes; Aivar Kala (I), 631 votes; Kalev Kukk (R), 365 votes; Uno Mereste (M), 2,976 votes; and Siiri Oviir (R), 2,749 votes.
