= Eino Tamm =

Estonian lawyer

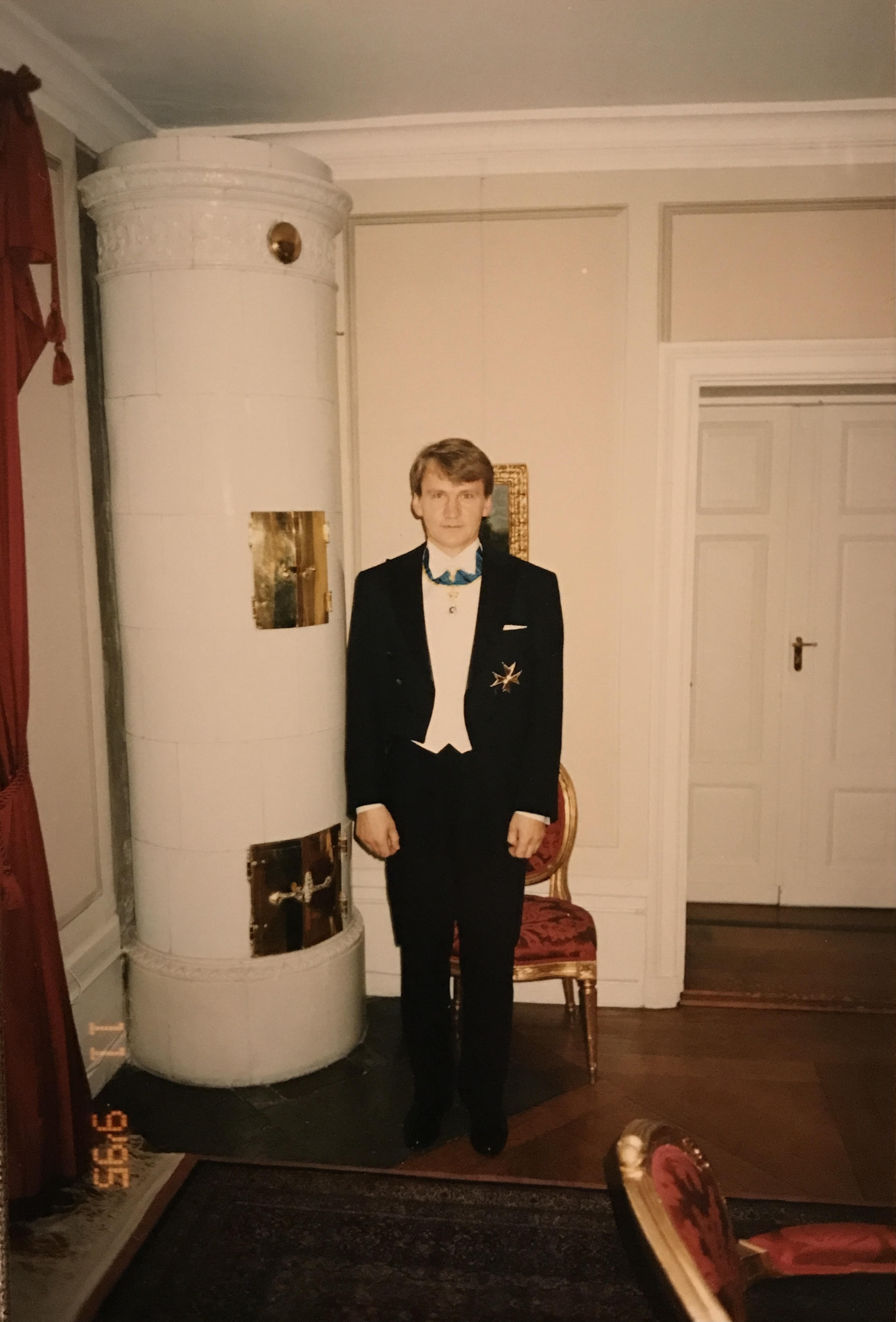
Eino Tamm in 1995

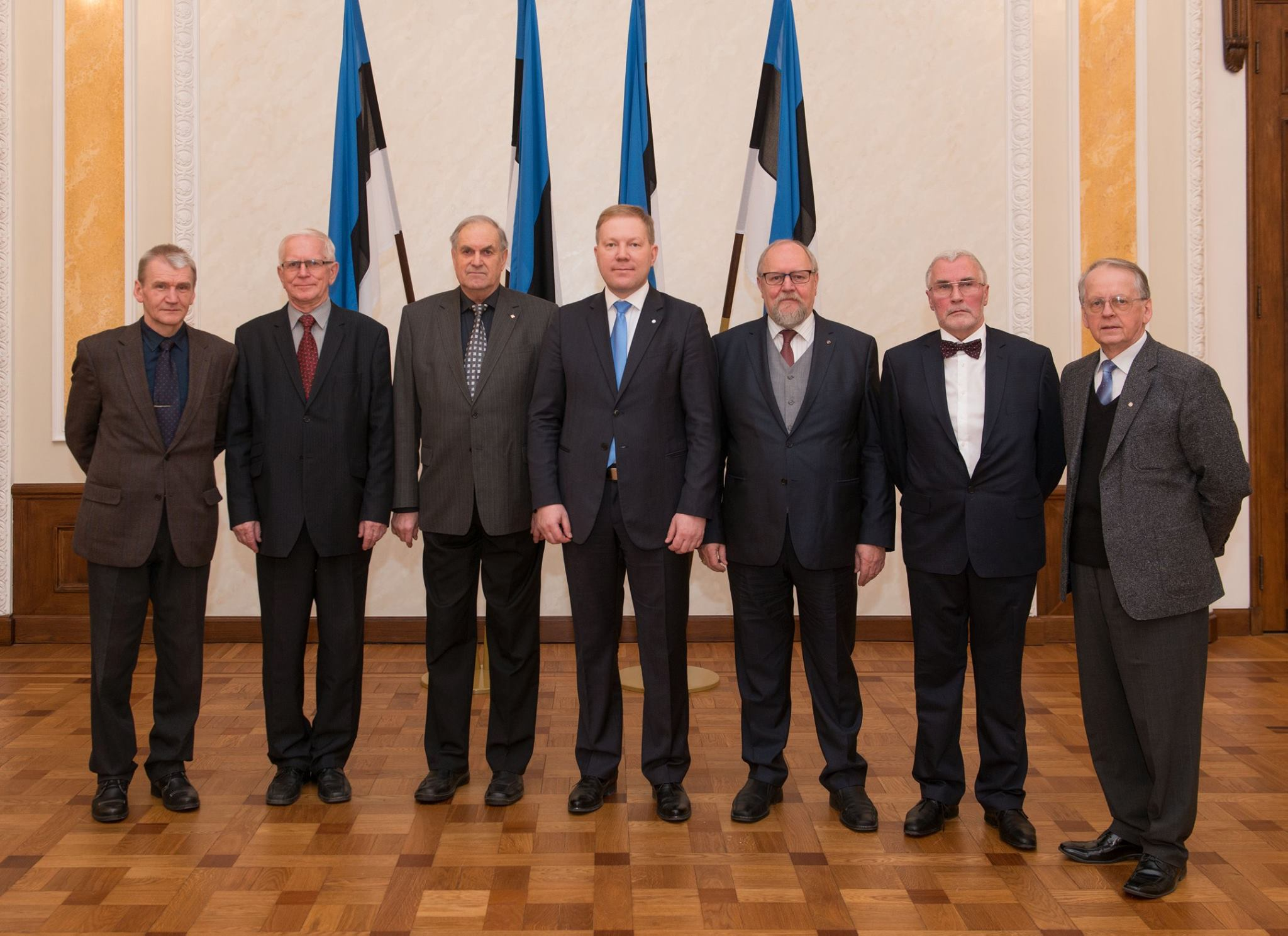
Chairmen and vice chairmen of the Foreign Affairs Committee of the Riigikogu in 2015. From the left: Eino Tamm, Andres Tarand, Tiit Made, Marko Mihkelson, Riivo Sinijärv, Anti Liiv, and Enn Eesmaa.

Eino Tamm (born 20 November 1951 in Häädemeeste Parish, Kilingi-Nõmme District) is an Estonian lawyer and former politician, a founding member of the Estonian Coalition Party. He was a member of VII Riigikogu and VIII Riigikogu.

== Education ==
In 1970, Eino Tamm graduated from Nõo Secondary School.

In 1975, he graduated from the University of Tartu with a law degree (cum laude).

In 1989, Tamm graduated from Estonian Business School.

== Career ==
Eino Tamm was a vice mayor of Tallinn from 1990 to 1993.

Tamm was a founding member of the Estonian Coalition Party, founded in 1991.

In 1993, Tamm became a member of the first post-Soviet era legislature of the Estonian Parliament – VII Riigikogu. He was also elected to VIII Riigikogu in 1995. Throughout his career as an MP (1993–1999), Eino Tamm was a member of the Foreign Affairs Committee. In VII Riigikogu, he served as Vice Chairman of the Foreign Affairs Committee. In VIII Riigikogu, he served as Chairman of the Foreign Affairs Committee.

Tamm worked actively towards the goal that Estonia would be admitted to NATO and was an ardent promoter of that cause in the Estonian media. Estonia was eventually admitted to NATO in 2004.

== Honours and awards ==
1995 – Commander 1st Class of the Swedish Royal Order of the Polar Star

== Personal life ==
Eino Tamm has six children, six grandchildren, and seven great-grandchildren.

Tamm's parents were farmers (during the Soviet time, collective farm workers) Jaan Tamm (1918–1977) and Linda Tamm (b. Linda Mitt) (1924–2011).

Tamm's maternal grandfather, Jüri Mitt, participated in the Estonian War of Independence. He was arrested and deported to Siberia by the Soviet regime in 1945. He was released in 1953, after which he returned to Estonia.

Tamm's parents had four sons, of whom he is the youngest.

In 1971, he married Helle Põld, a fellow law student at the University of Tartu. Helle Tamm did not complete her law studies and later, after graduating from Tallinn Pedagogical University, became a librarian. They have four children – two sons and two daughters –, as well as six grandchildren and seven great-grandchildren. They divorced in 1995.

In 1997, Tamm married Sirje Subbe, a piano teacher and a founder of the Estonian Suzuki Association. Eino Tamm and Sirje Subbe-Tamm have a son and a daughter. Sirje Subbe-Tamm died in 2023.
