= Savisaar =

Family name

Savisaar is a surname of Estonian origin. Notable people with the surname include:

- Edgar Savisaar (1950–2022), Estonian politician, interim Prime Minister of Estonia
- Erki Savisaar (born 1978), Estonian politician, son of Edgar
- Vilja Savisaar (born 1962), Estonian politician, ex-wife of Edgar
