= Kukk =

Family name

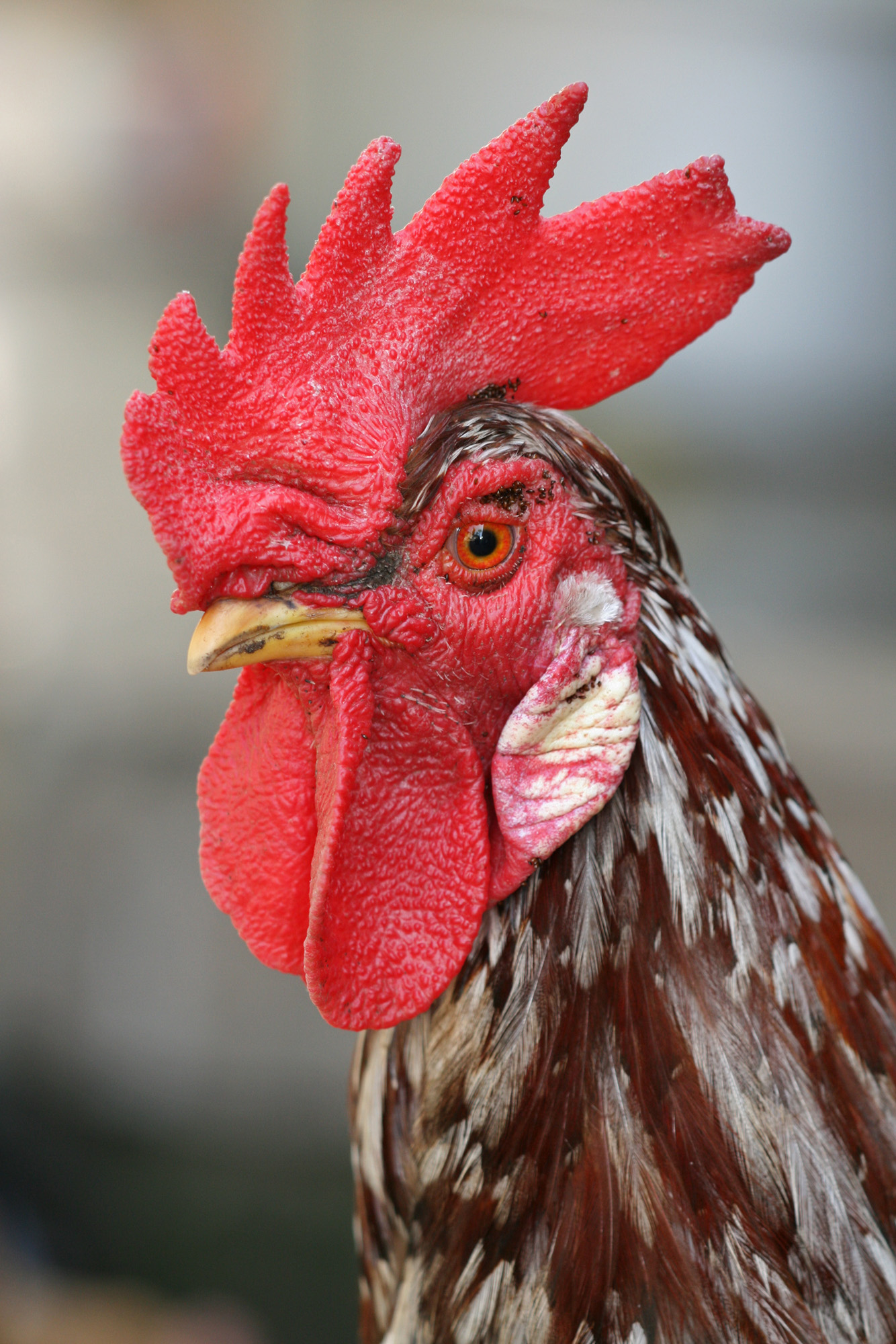

Origin
- Language: Estonian
- Meaning: Rooster
- Region of origin: Estonia

Kukk is a common Estonian surname, translated as 'rooster, cock'. It may refer to:

- Aino Kukk (1930–2006), chess player
- Alfred Kukk (1906–1981), sport shooter
- Artur Kukk (1889–1958), speed skater, wrestler and boxer
- August Kukk (1908–1988), wrestler
- Elys Kretelle Kukk (born 2009), rhythmic gymnast
- Erich Kukk (1928–2017), phycologist and conservationist
- Ille Kukk (born 1957), track and field athlete
- Jakob Kukk (1870–1933), clergyman
- Juhan Kukk (1885–1942), politician and entrepreneur
- Jüri Kukk (1940–1981), chemist and Soviet dissident
- Kalev Kukk (born 1951), geographer and politician
- Leonhard Kukk (1906–1944), weightlifter
- Martin Kukk (born 1987), politician
- Mihkel Kukk (born 1983), javelin thrower
- Sigvard Kukk (born 1972), cyclist
- Tõnu-Reid Kukk (1939–2011), politician
- Toomas Kukk (born 1971), botanist
- Ülle Kukk (born 1937), botanist
