= Epp Haabsaar =

Estonian politician

- Born: 21 November 1953 (age 72); Viljandi, then part of Estonian SSR, Soviet Union
- Education: Tartu State University

Epp Haabsaar (born 21 November 1953) is an Estonian judge and politician. She was a member of VII Riigikogu, representing the Estonian National Independence Party.

HHabsaar was born in Viljandi. She was a 1980 graduate of Tartu State University's Faculty of Law. Until 2012, she was a judge at Harju County Court.

Haabsaar has compiled and illustrated a book of fairy tales. She also works as an icon painter. She has painted the icons of the iconostasis of Angerja Church of the Ascension of the Estonian Apostolic Orthodox Church in Kohila.
