= Ardo (given name) =

Male given name

Ardo is a male given name. People named Ardo include:

- Ardo (died 720/721), Visigothic king
- Ardo Smaragdus, 9th-century hagiographer
- Ardo Ärmpalu (born 1980), Estonian basketball player
- Ardo Arusaar (born 1988), Estonian wrestler
- Ardo Hansson (born 1958), Estonian economist
- Ardo Kreek (born 1986), Estonian volleyball player
- Ardo Ojasalu (born 1964), Estonian computer engineer and politician
- Ardo Rennik (1947–2009), Estonian figure skater and coach
- Ardo Smaragdus (died 843), French hagiographer
- Ardo Ran Varres (born 1974), Estonian actor and composer
