= Ello (disambiguation) =

Ello is a municipality in the Province of Lecco in the Italian region Lombardy.

Ello may also refer to:

- Ello Creation System, construction toy
- Ello (social network)
- Peeter Ello (1955 – 1997), Estonian politician
- Ello, a transliteration variant of the name of the Korean singer Elo
- Erinnyis ello, a species of moth also known as the ello sphinx moth
