= Peeter Lorents =

Estonian mathematician and politician

Peeter Lorents (born 25 September 1951 Pärnu) is an Estonian mathematician and politician. He was a member of VII Riigikogu.
