= Andrus Villem =

Estonian philologist and politician

Andrus Villem (born 21 March 1959 Kose) is an Estonian philologist and politician. He was a member of VII Riigikogu.
