= Sergei Zonov =

Estonian politician (born 1966)

Sergei Zonov (born 18 July 1966 in Sillamäe) is an Estonian politician. He was a member of VII Riigikogu.
