= Toivo Jullinen =

Estonian politician (born 1963)

Toivo Jullinen (born 28 May 1963 in Paide) is an Estonian politician. He was a member of VII Riigikogu.
