= Merle Krigul =

Estonian philologist and politician

Merle Krigul (born 23 December 1954 Tartu) is an Estonian philologist and politician. She was a member of VII Riigikogu.

Merle Krigul graduated from the University of Tartu with a degree in Estonian language and literature in 1978. She defended her master's degree in international business management (MBA) at the Estonian Business School in 2004 and received her doctorate in international relations at Audentes University. In 2005, she worked as the State Chancellery as an advisor to the Prime Minister.
