= Lembit Küüts =

Estonian politician (born 1946)

Lembit Küüts (born 18 October 1946 Tallinn) is an Estonian artist and politician. He was a member of VII Riigikogu.
