= Sulev Alajõe =

Estonian politician (born 1965)

Sulev Alajõe (born 12 December 1965 in Pärnu) is an Estonian politician and lecturer. He was a member of VII Riigikogu.
