= Eve Pärnaste =

Estonian politician (born 1951)

Eve Pärnaste (born 19 February 1951 in Tartu) is an Estonian psychologist and politician. She was a member of VII Riigikogu.
