= Rein Hanson =

Estonian politician

Rein Hanson (born 18 June 1948) is an Estonian journalist, television presenter, and politician. Hanson was born in Hälvati.

Hanson was a host of the Eesti Televisioon (ETV) program Vilveski. He was a member of VII Riigikogu.
