= Avo Kiir =

Estonian clergyman and politician

Avo Kiir (born 23 February 1952 in Mäetaguse) is an Estonian Lutheran clergyman and politician. He was a member of VII Riigikogu.
