= Vambola Põder =

Estonian politician

Vambola Põder (born 6 August 1929 in Tartu – 12 March 1993 Tallinn) is an Estonian journalist and politician. He was a member of VII Riigikogu.
