= Viktor Niitsoo =

Estonian politician (born 1952)

Viktor Niitsoo (born 12 March 1952 Kuressaare) is an Estonian politician, Soviet dissident and historian. He was a member of VII Riigikogu.
