= Jaanus Raidal =

Estonian politician (born 1963)

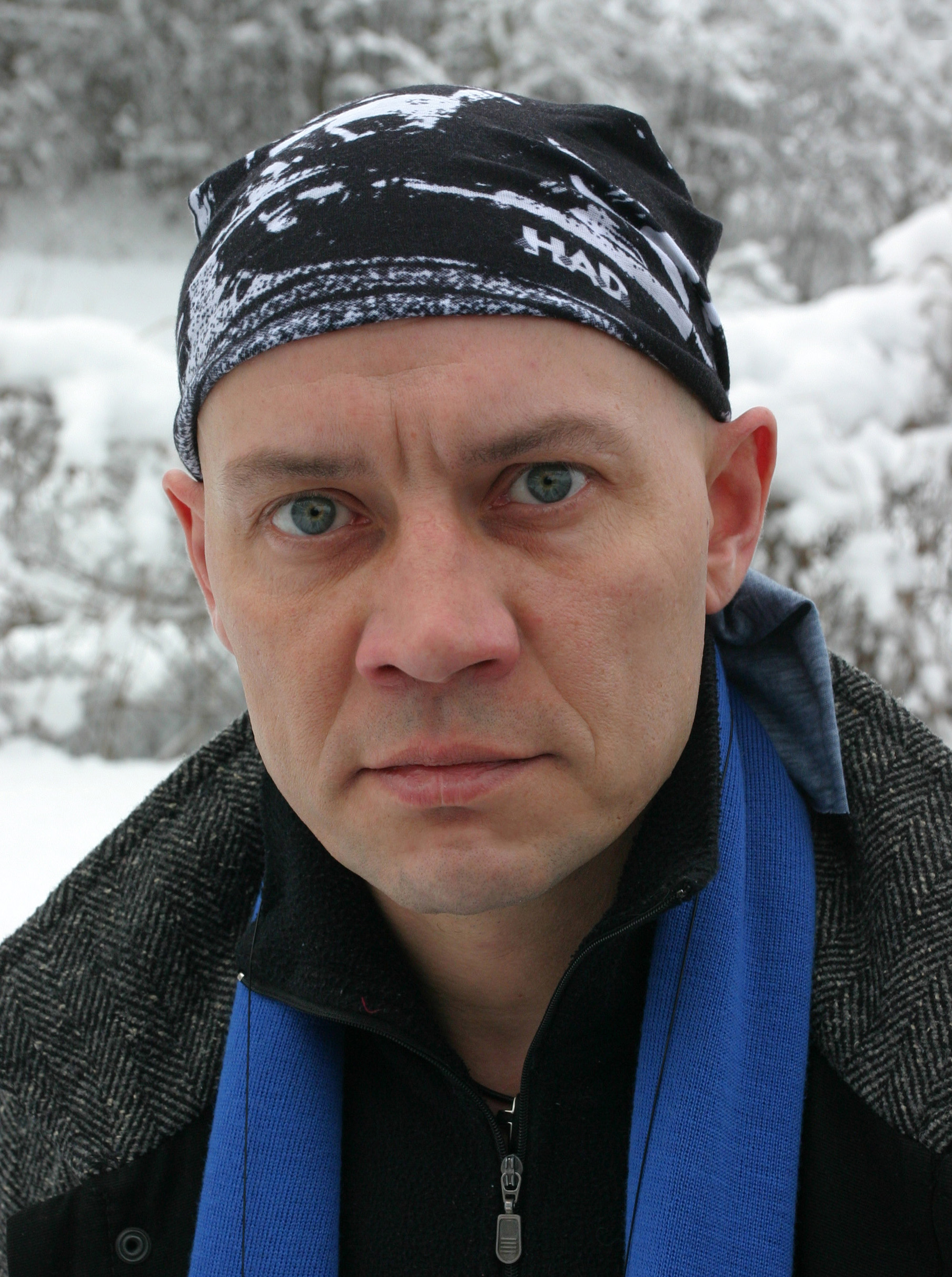
Jaanus Raidal

Jaanus Raidal (born 19 September 1963 Tartu) is an Estonian politician. He was a member of VII Riigikogu. From 1989 until 1993, he was the mayor of Otepää.
