= Toivo Uustalo =

Estonian politician (born 1946)

Toivo Uustalo (born 23 August 1946 in Puka) is an Estonian politician. He was a member of VII Riigikogu.
