= Rein Kikerpill =

Estonian journalist and politician (born 1962)

Rein Kikerpill (born 21 October 1962 Tallinn) is an Estonian journalist and politician. He was a member of VII Riigikogu.
