= Paul-Olev Mõtsküla =

Estonian politician

Paul-Olev Mõtsküla (5 December 1934 in Tartu – 23 January 2023 in Helme) was an Estonian politician. He was a member of VII Riigikogu.
