= Mati Hint =

Estonian linguist and politician

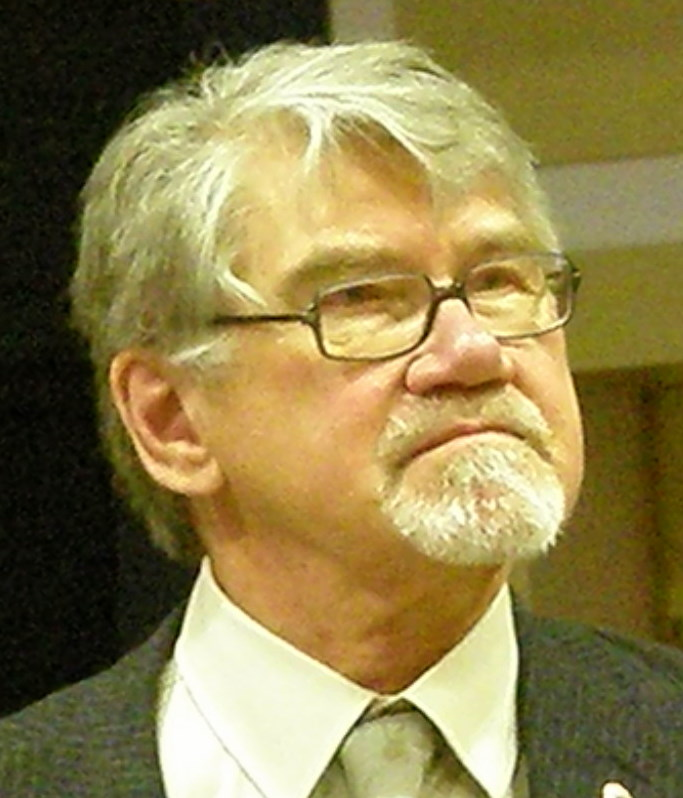
Mati Hint

Mati Hint (28 August 1937 – 5 December 2019) was an Estonian linguist and politician. He was a member of VII Riigikogu (for Estonian Center Party).
