= Olli Toomik =

Estonian physician and politician (born 1938)

Olli Toomik (born 6 November 1938 in Narva) is an Estonian physician and politician. She was a member of VII Riigikogu.
