= Kalju Põldvere =

Estonian politician

Kalju Põldvere (23 May 1929 – 2 September 2011) was an Estonian zoologist, medical doctor, educator and politician. He was a member of VII Riigikogu.

Põldvere was born in Keila Parish, Harju County. He graduated from secondary school at the Tallinn Reaalkool in 1947 and from the Faculty of Medicine of Tartu State University in 1953.

From 1953 until 1960, he was the employed at the Tartu Hospital Clinic. From 1956 until 1960, he was employed at Tartu State University's Histology Department, and from 1960 until 1963, an assistant in the Neurology Department.

From 1976 until 1987, he was a professor at the Department of Pathological Anatomy and Forensic Science at Tartu State University, as well as a professor at the Department of Zoology at the Faculty of Biology and Geography. From 1987 until 1991, he was Head of the Department of Zoology at the institution. From 1985 until 1988, was also a professor of histology at the Estonian Agricultural University, and professor emeritus since 1995.
