= K. Jaak Roosaare =

Estonian politician

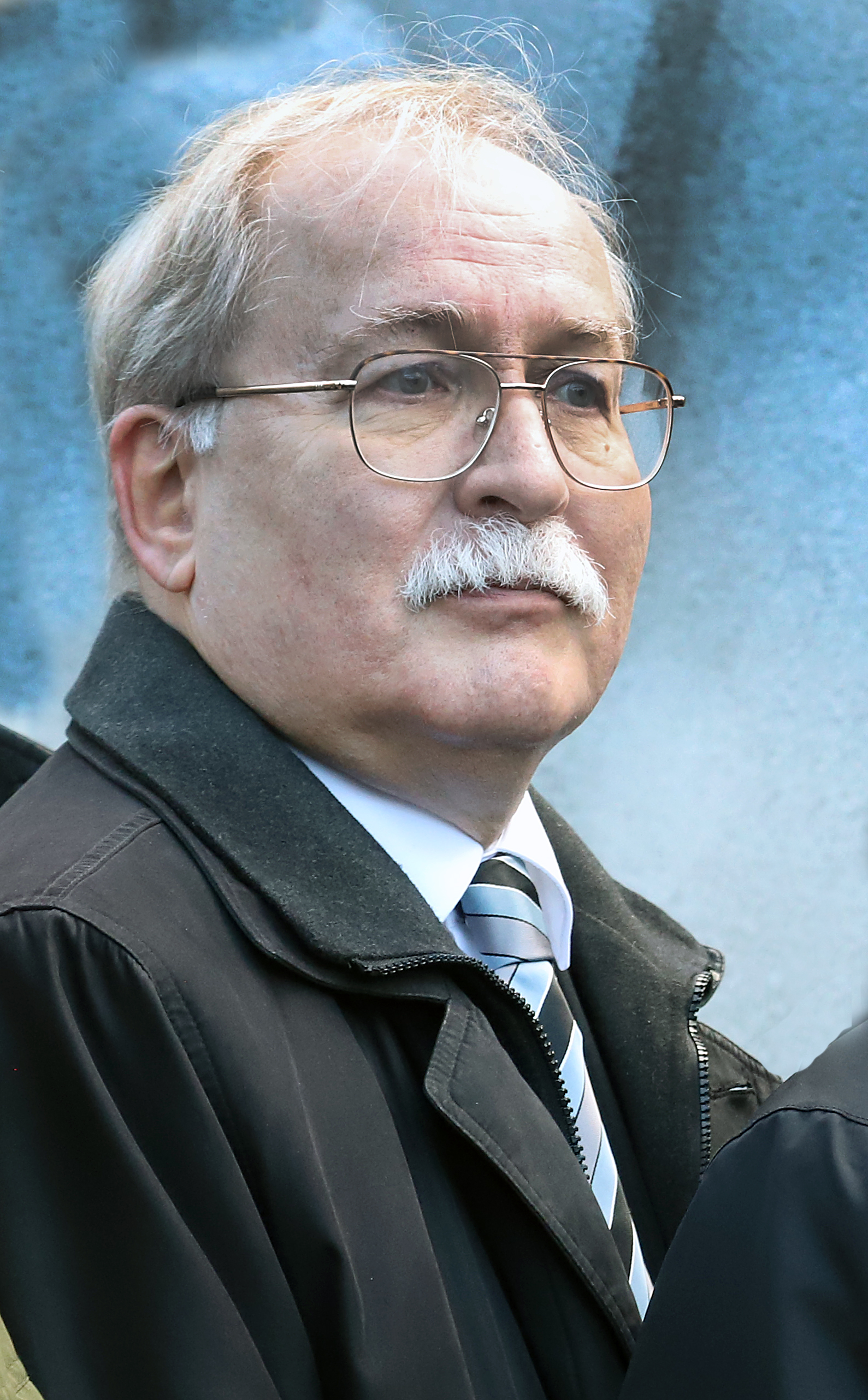
Roosaare in 2022

K. Jaak Roosaare (also Kaarel Jaak Roosaare; born 19 July 1954 New York, USA) is an Estonian politician. He was a member of VII Riigikogu.
