= Aime Sügis =

Estonian politician and chemist

Aime Sügis (born 21 January 1935, in Tallinn) is an Estonian chemist and politician. She was a member of VII Riigikogu.
