= Mihkel Kraav =

Estonian politician

Mihkel Kraav (born 9 February 1966) is an Estonian historian, data communications specialist and politician.

Kraav was born in Tartu. He was a member of VII Riigikogu.
