= Daimar Liiv =

Estonian politician (born 1966)

Daimar Liiv (born 18 August 1966 in Tallinn) is an Estonian politician. He was a member of VII Riigikogu.
