= Ivar Raig =

Estonian politician

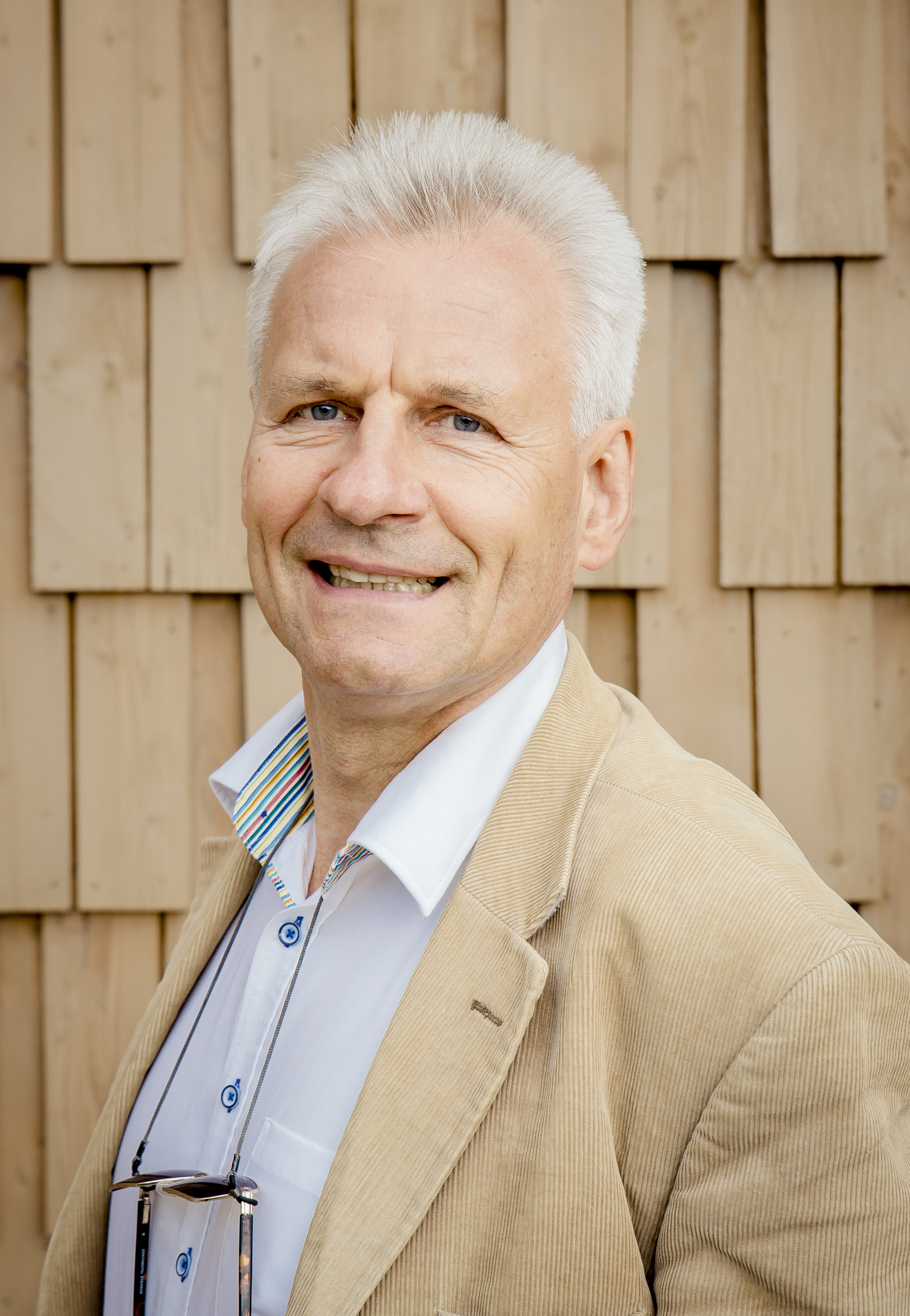
Raig in 2017

Ivar Raig (born 25 March 1953 Tartu) is an Estonian economist and politician. He was a member of the VII Riigikogu.
