= Tõnu Kõrda =

Estonian politician

Tõnu Kõrda (born 19 September 1952 Võru) is an Estonian politician. He was a member of VII Riigikogu.
