= Valve Kirsipuu =

Estonian politician and economist

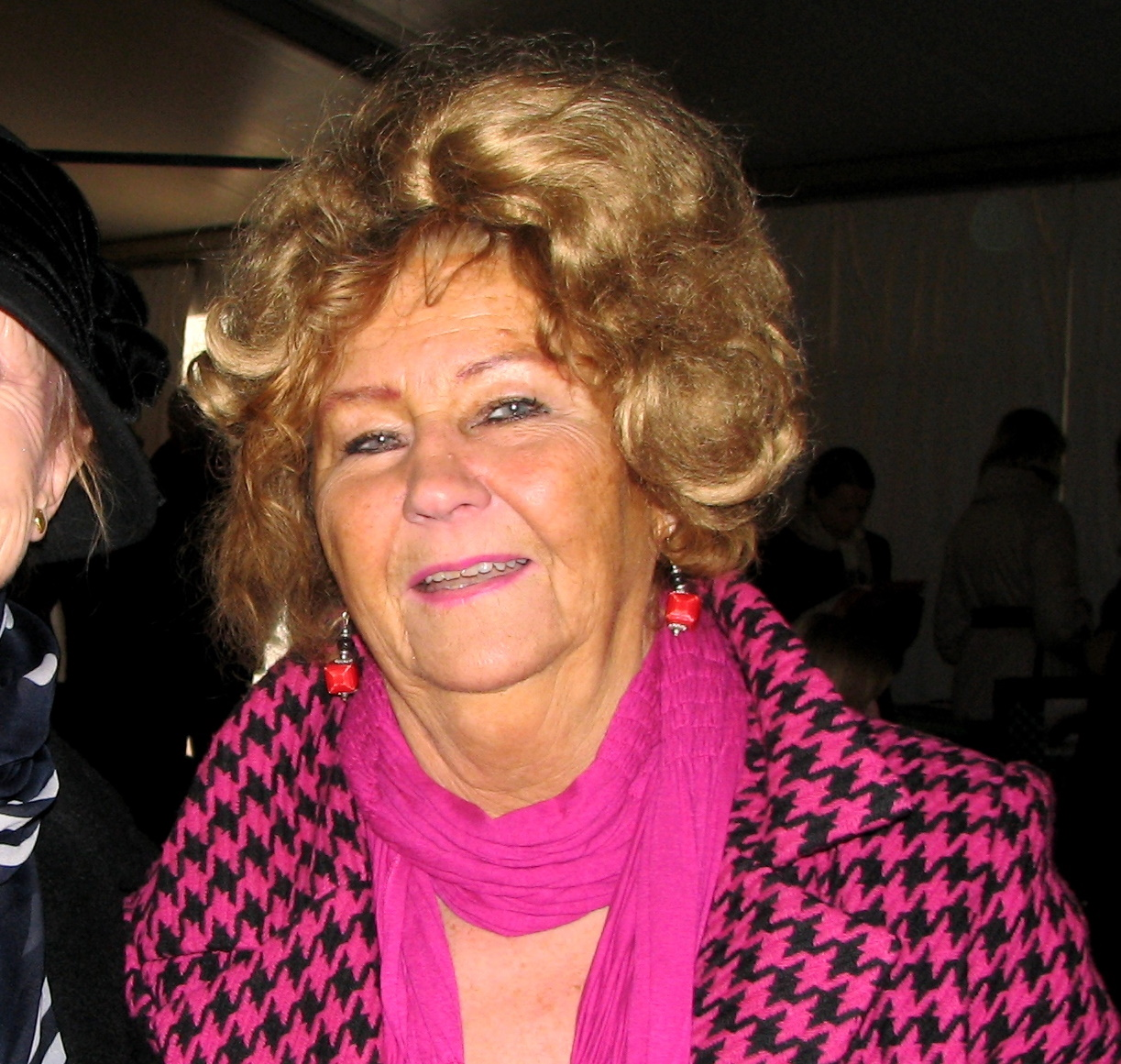
Valve Kirsipuu in 2010

Valve Kirsipuu (née Valve Elu; 5 March 1933 Tallinn – 20 September 2017 Corfu) was an Estonian economist and politician. She was a member of the VII, VIII and IX Riigikogu.

On 10 September 2017, Valve Kirsipuu had a heart attack while swimming on the island of Corfu in Greece. She was hospitalized, but died ten days later in hospital on Corfu, aged 84.
