= Heido Vitsur =

Estonian economist and politician

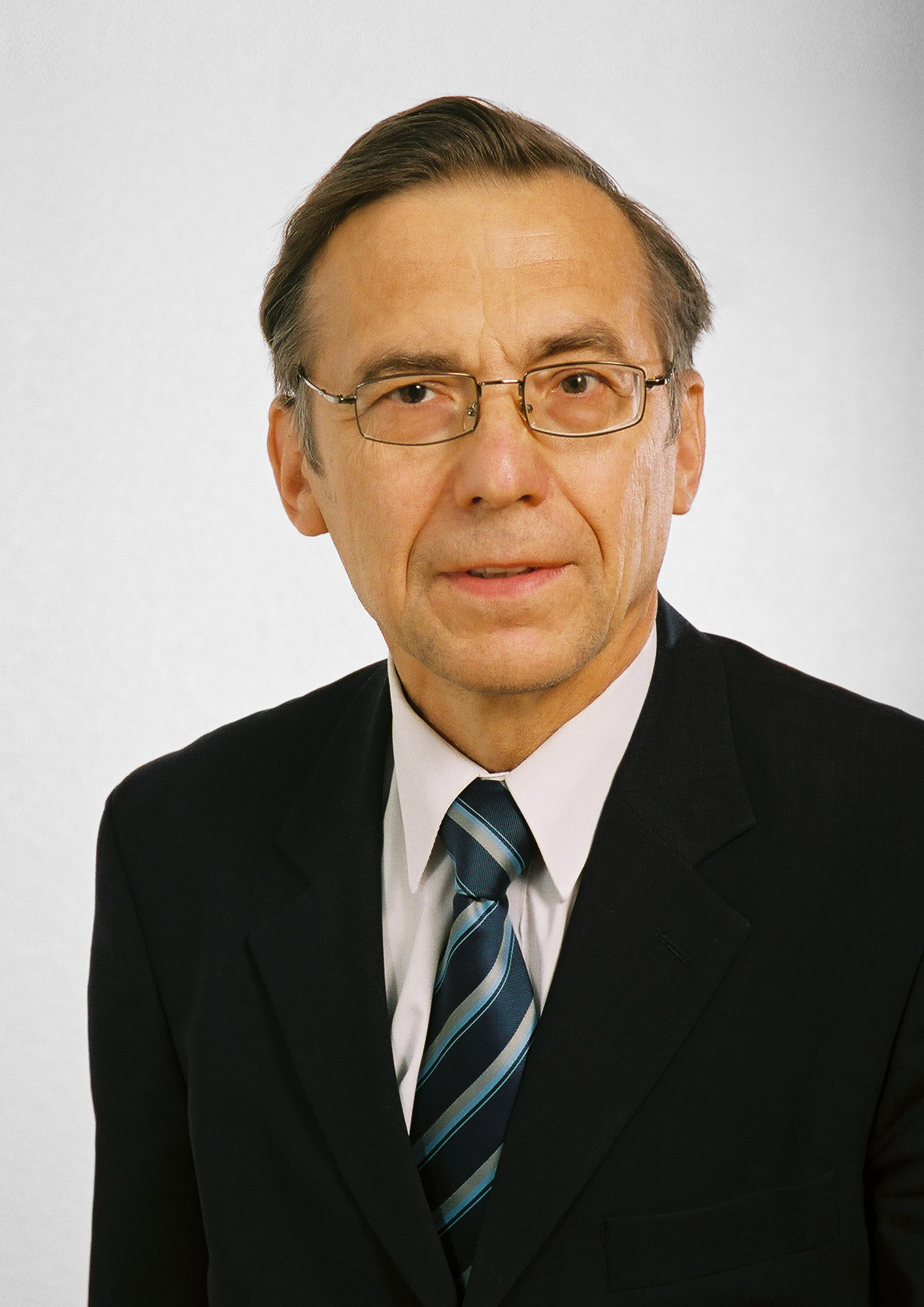
Heido Vitsur

Heido Vitsur (born 28 March 1944 Tartu) is an Estonian economist and politician. In 1992, he was Minister of Economy. He was a member of VII Riigikogu.
