= Raoul Üksvärav =

Estonian economist and politician

Raoul Üksvärav (21 April 1928 Tallinn – 2 March 2016) was an Estonian economist and politician. He was a member of VII Riigikogu.

In 1952 he graduated cum laude from the Tallinn University of Technology's Department of Economics, majoring in industrial economics. From 1953 to 1956 he was a postgraduate student at the Institute of Economics of the Estonian SSR Academy of Sciences, in 1956 he defended his doctoral dissertation (approved in 1957), and in 1967 he defended his doctoral dissertation in economics (approved in 1969).

From 1963 until 1964 he was an exchange researcher at the University of California and Massachusetts Institute of Technology.
