= Rein Arjukese =

Estonian politician and naturalist (1941–2018)

Rein Arjukese (20 February 1941 – 14 July 2018) was an Estonian naturalist, dissident during the Soviet era, and politician. He was a member of VII Riigikogu.

Arjukuse was born in Tartu and died at age 77 in Vetepere. In 2001, he was awarded the Order of the White Star, Medal Class.
