= Aivar Kala =

Estonian politician (born 1957)

Aivar Kala (born 16 December 1957) is an Estonian politician. He was a member of VII Riigikogu.
