= Vello Saatpalu =

Estonian politician (1935–2013)

Vello Saatpalu (31 May 1935 Tallinn – 5 January 2013) was an Estonian engineer, politician, and sport sailor. He was a member of VII Riigikogu.
