= Ants-Enno Lõhmus =

Estonian politician (born 1936)

Ants-Enno Lõhmus (born 17 March 1936 in Tallinn) is an Estonian politician. He was a member of VII Riigikogu.
