= Tiina Benno =

Estonian politician

Tiina Benno (born 19 April 1961 in Tartu) is an Estonian politician. She was a member of VII Riigikogu.
