= Peeter Ello =

Estonian politician (1955–1997)

Peeter Ello (11 February 1955 Tallinn – 17 March 1997 Tallinn) was an Estonian politician. He was a member of VII Riigikogu.
