= Heiki Raudla =

Estonian politician (born 1949)

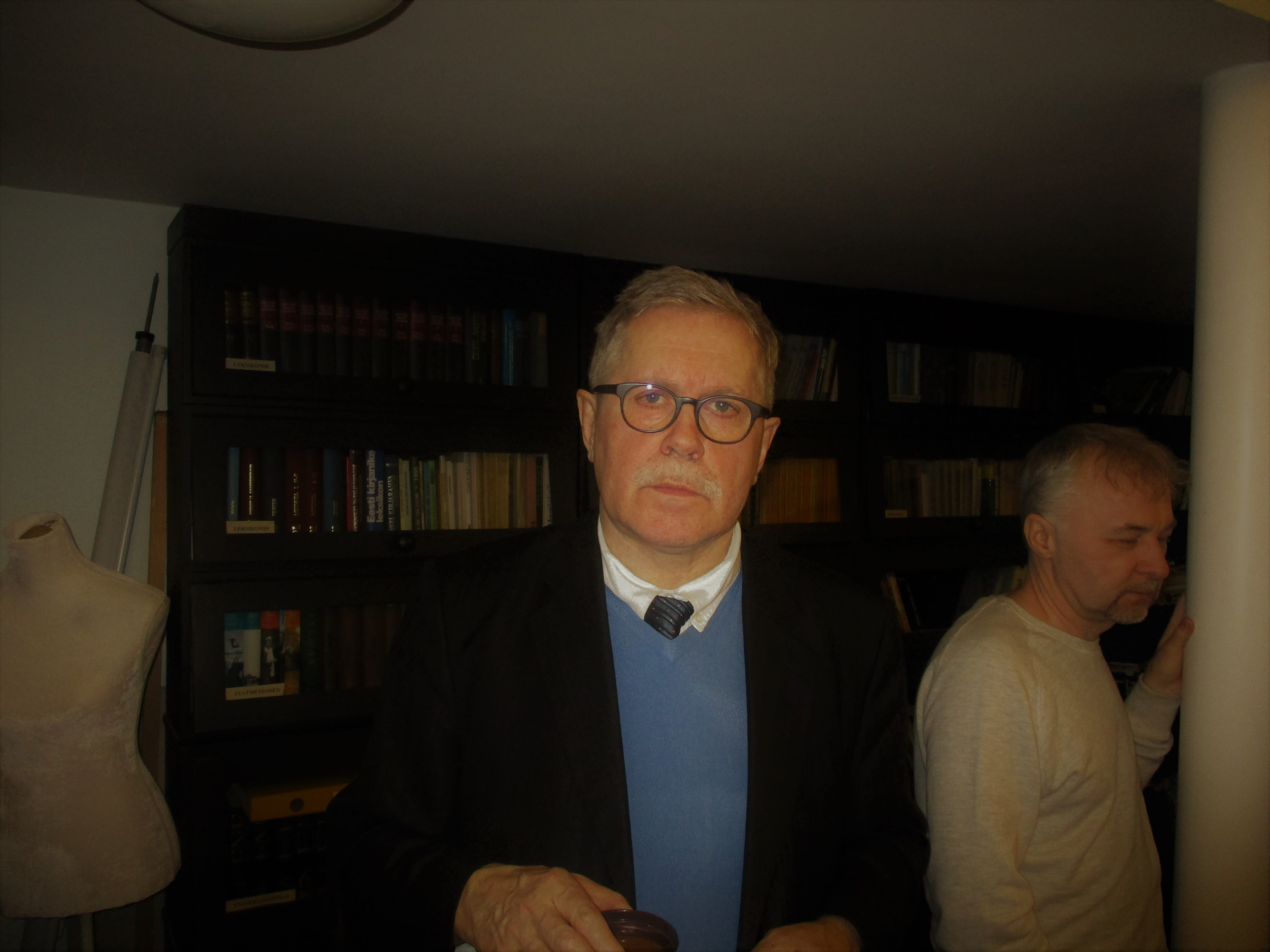
- Born: 20 May 1949 (age 76)

Heiki Raudla (born 20 May 1949 in Võhma) is an Estonian educator, cartoonist and politician.

Rausla graduated from the Department of Physics and Chemistry of Tartu State University in 1972 with a degree in physics. He later worked as a physics teacher. Since 1972, he has been drawing cartoons for newspapers such as Edasi, Tee Kommunismile, Sakala, Oma maa, and magazines such as Pikker and Noorus.

He was a member of VII Riigikogu. From 1991 until 1992, he was the mayor of Viljandi
