= Priit Aimla =

Estonian writer, poet and politician (1941–2026)

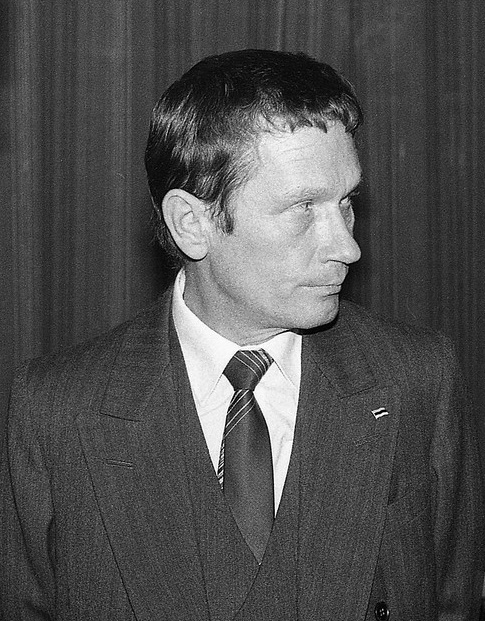
Aimla in 1988

Priit Aimla (19 April 1941 – 28 August 2026) was an Estonian writer, poet, humorist and politician known for several stage plays and books. During 1992 to 1995, he belonged to the VII Riigikogu, having been elected as a member of the Independent Royalist Party of Estonia; later, he switched to the Estonian Centre Party and was elected as a member of VIII Riigikogu. From 1999 to his death in 2026, he was a member of the Estonian Social Democratic Party.

== Life and career ==
Aimla was born in Võru on 19 April 1941. In October 1980, Aimla was a signatory of the Letter of 40 Intellectuals, a public letter in which forty prominent Estonian intellectuals defended the Estonian language and protested the Russification policies of the Kremlin in Estonia. The signatories also expressed their unease against Republic-level government in harshly dealing with youth protests in Tallinn that were sparked a week earlier due to the banning of a public performance of the punk rock band Propeller.

Aimla died on 28 August 2026, at the age of 85.

== Awards ==
In 1990, Priit Aimla was awarded the Meie Mats.
