= Tõnu Juul =

Estonian physician and politician

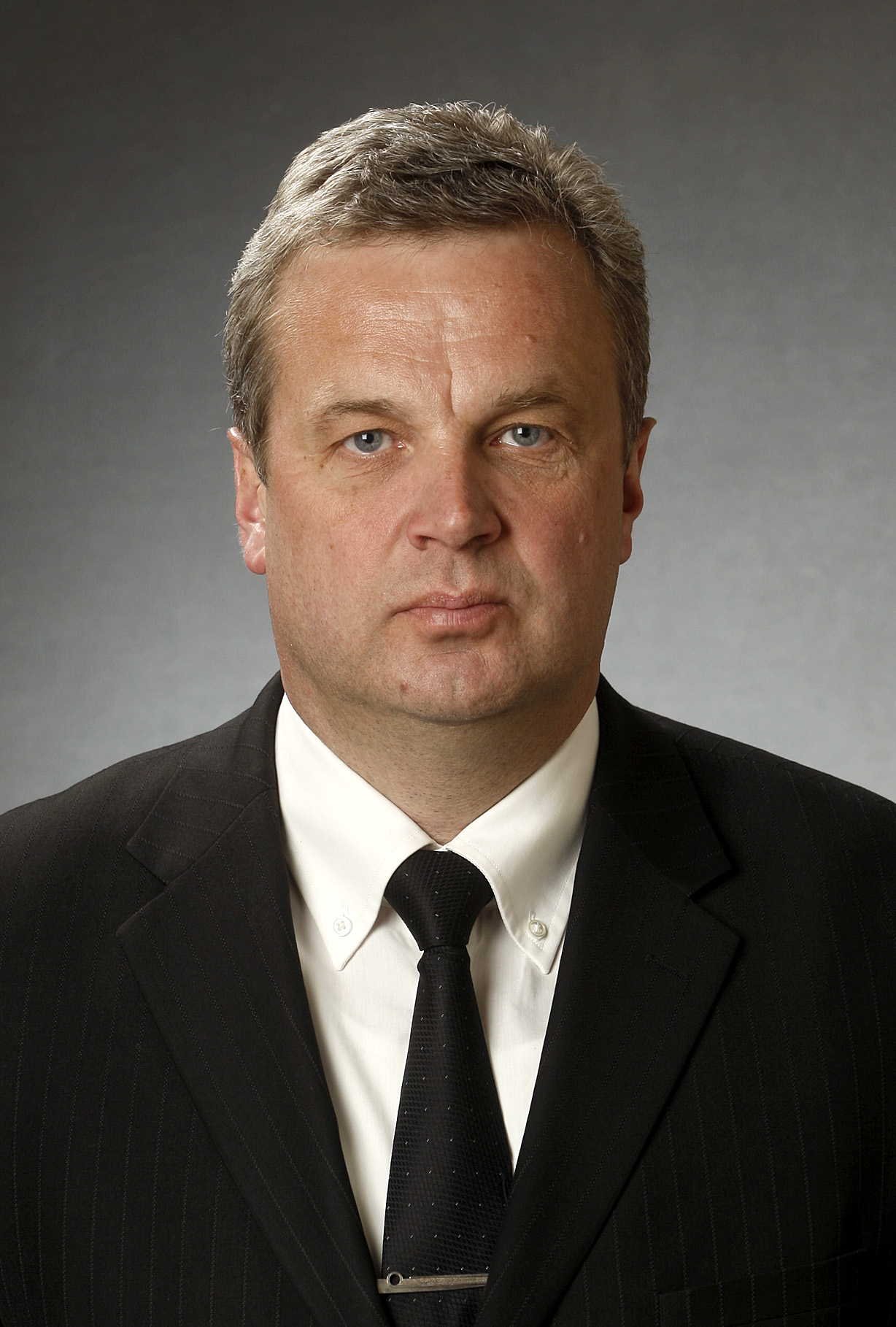
Tõnu Juul

Tõnu Juul (born 21 April 1958 in Viljandi) is an Estonian physician and politician. He was a member of VII Riigikogu.
