= Tiit Vähi =

Estonian politician

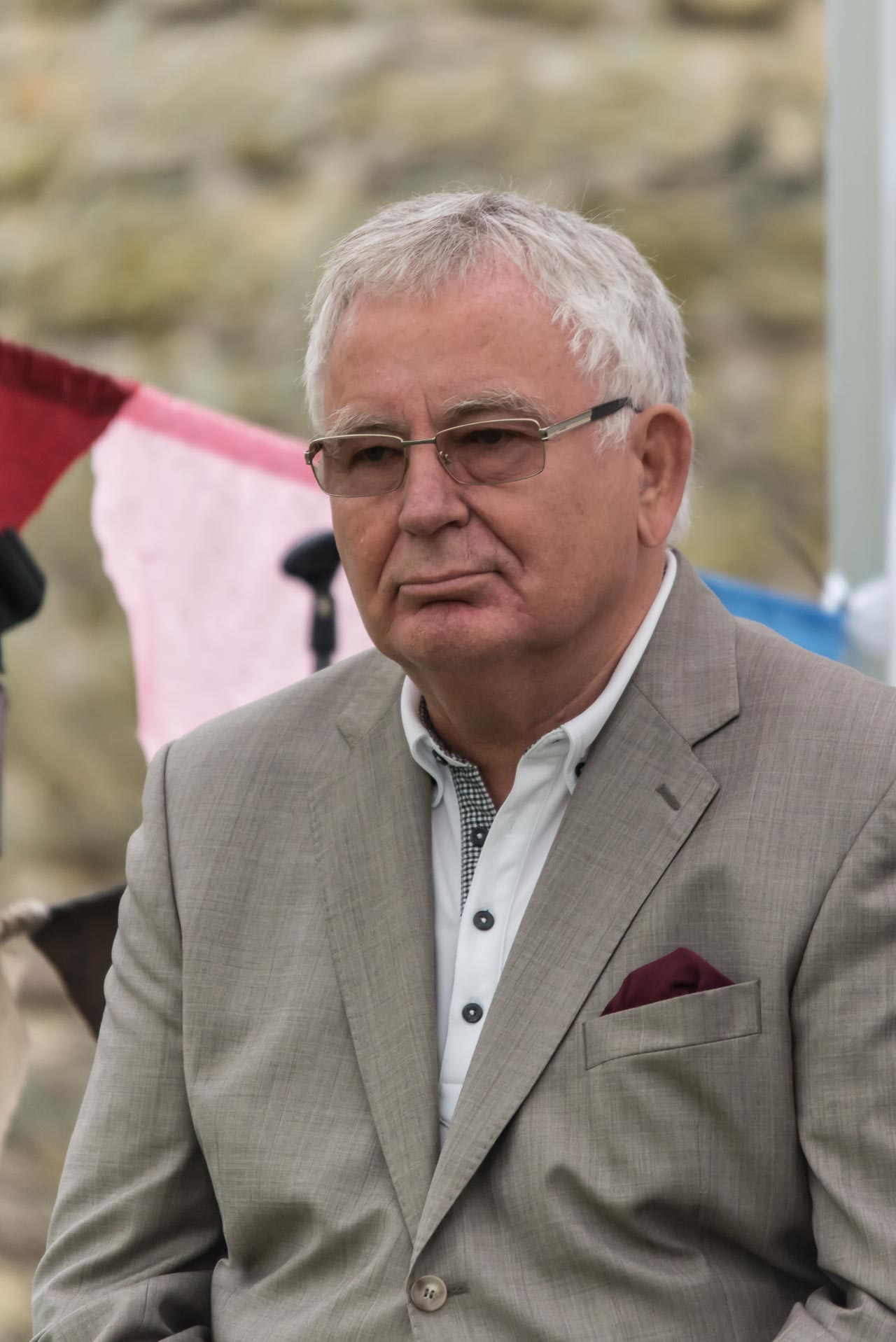
- Vähi in 2016

Prime Minister of Estonia
- In office 17 April 1995 – 17 March 1997
- President: Lennart Meri
- Preceded by: Andres Tarand
- Succeeded by: Mart Siimann

Prime Minister of the Interim Government
- In office 29 January 1992 – 21 October 1992
- President: Arnold Rüütel as Chairman of the Supreme Council; Lennart Meri
- Preceded by: Edgar Savisaar
- Succeeded by: Mart Laar as Prime Minister

Personal details
- Born: 10 January 1947 (age 79) Kaagjärve Parish, Valga County, then part of Estonian SSR, Soviet Union
- Party: Estonian Coalition Party
- Education: Tallinn Technical University

Tiit Vähi (born 10 January 1947) is an Estonian politician who was Prime Minister of Estonia from 1995 to 1997. He was also acting Prime Minister for several months during 1992 under the transitional government.

== Life and career ==
Born in Kaagjärve Parish, Estonia, Vähi graduated from the Tallinn Technical University with a degree in engineering. From the time of his graduation until 1992, he served in several top managerial post with the Valga Trucking Company.

During the Estonian national independence movement, Vähi was among the organisers of the Estonian Popular Front, and led its regional committee in Valga County. In 1989, he was appointed Minister of Transport and Communications, a post that he held until January 1992. During his tenure as Transport Minister, he forged close ties with the transport ministries of the Nordic countries and improved relations with the other two Baltic States on transport related issues. He transferred control of Estonia's airports, railways and sea ports, under the control Moscow, to the Estonian authorities.

Shortly after Estonia's return to independence in 1991, Vähi was appointed as the Government's special representative to north-eastern Estonia, a region inhabited by a majority of ethnic Russians.

On 29 January 1992, Vähi became the second post-Soviet Prime Minister of Estonia, succeeding Edgar Savisaar. During this first stint as prime minister, he embarked upon a vast programme to transform the country's economy from its being centrally controlled into a more free market economy. His government also introduced the Estonian currency, the Kroon, in June 1992. He also founded the Estonian Privatisation Agency, which embarked on the privatisation of government-owned assets to the private sector.

As agreed when he assumed the post of prime minister in the transition government, Vähi did not participate in the parliamentary elections on 20 September 1992.

In 1993, he was elected Chairman of the Estonian Coalition Party. The parliamentary elections of March 1995 gave victory to the KMÜ coalition, comprising the Estonian Coalition Party and the People's Union of Estonia Parties. As leader of the Estonian Coalition Party, Vähi was asked by President Lennart Meri to form a government. Appointed Prime Minister for the second time in his career, he formed a coalition government of the KMÜ and the Estonian Centre Party, which was sworn in on 17 April 1995.

His second term as prime minister was quite rocky. On 11 October 1995 several ministers resigned from the cabinet, causing the Estonian Centre Party to withdraw from the government coalition. On 7 November 1995, Vähi reformed the government, this time with the help of the Estonian Reform Party. This collaboration lasted less than a year; on 20 November 1996, six ministers, including then-Foreign Minister Siim Kallas, resigned, causing a collapse of the collaboration between the Coalition Party and the Reform Party. On 1 December 1996, Vähi once again reformed the government; however, this time, he only used members of his own party, thus greatly reducing its ability to retain power. On 7 February 1995, Vähi survived a no-confidence vote, 46–45. Feeling pressure from within his own party, he resigned on 25 February 1997. Three days later, on 27 February, President Lennart Meri named Mart Siimann as the new prime minister. By 2001, the Estonian Coalition Party, the party that Vähi had helped to form, and which presided over the Estonian government from 1995 to 1999, disbanded. He is currently a member of the free-market liberal Reform Party but is not active in politics and has concentrated on his career as a businessman. He has expressed opinion that Estonia needs to improve relations with Russia.

Political offices
Preceded by Edgar Savisaar	Prime Minister of Estonia; 1992	Succeeded by Mart Laar
Preceded by Andres Tarand	Prime Minister of Estonia; 1995–1997	Succeeded by Mart Siimann
