= Andres Heinapuu =

Estonian politician

Andres Heinapuu (born 16 March 1954 Tallinn) is an Estonian bibliographer and politician. He was a member of VII Riigikogu. He is active in the Estonian neopagan organisation Maavalla Koda.
