= Katrin Linde =

Estonian artist and politician

Katrin Linde (born 27 September 1951 Tallinn) is an Estonian artist and politician. She was a member of VII Riigikogu.
