= Kalev Raave =

Estonian clergyman and politician

Kalev Raave (born 20 March 1926 Konguta Parish, Tartu County – 4 March 2004) was an Estonian clergyman, journalist, newspaper editor, caricaturist, and politician. He was also a member of VII Riigikogu.

Raave married Lydia Majas. His children include actress Rita Raave, theologian and social scientist Raivo J. Raave, and educator Riho Raave.
