= Ardo Ojasalu =

Estonian politician (born 1964)

Ardo Ojasalu (born 21 September 1964 Tallinn) is an Estonian computer engineer and politician. He was a member of VII Riigikogu.
