= Kuno Raude =

Estonian architect and politician

Kuno Raude (born 13 April 1941 Rakvere) is an Estonian architect and politician. He was a member of VII Riigikogu.

From 1967 to 1972, Kuno Raude studied architecture at the Estonian Academy of Arts. From 1978 to 1982, he lectured at the Department of Architecture at the Estonian Academy of Arts (architectural design, architectural graphics, figurative geometry, supervision of theses, scholarly work "Comparative analysis of the regeneration of historical cities"). He is the author of nearly 500 articles and six books, as well as the co-author of three books, all written in Estonian. He has been a member of the Union of Estonian Architects since 1983, as well as chairman of the urban planning council.
