= Lauri Einer =

Estonian politician (born 1931)

Lauri Einer (born 16 October 1931 in Tartu) is an Estonian politician. He was a member of VII Riigikogu.
