= Erki Savisaar =

Estonian politician

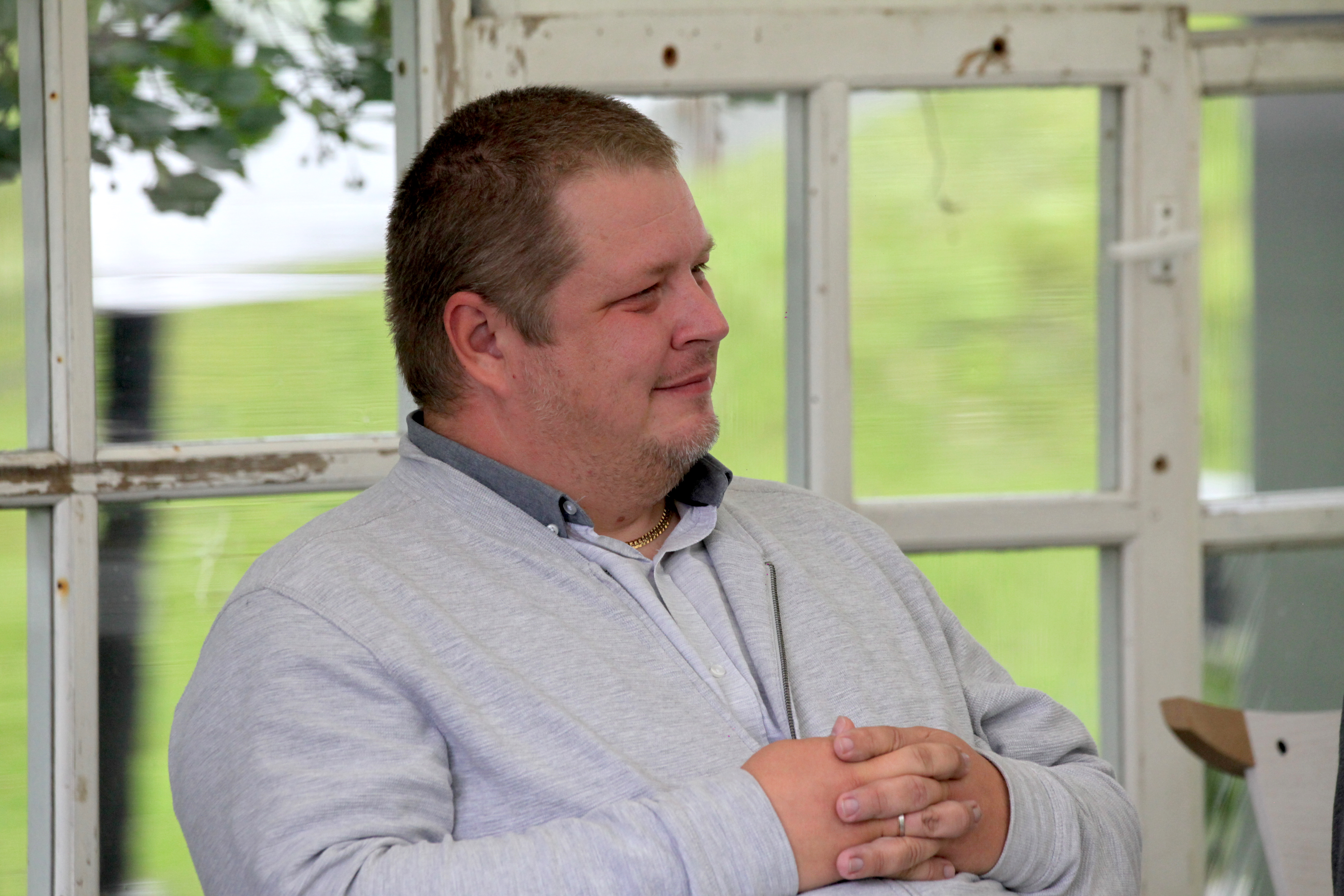
Erki Savisaar at the Opinion Festival 2021 in Paide, Estonia

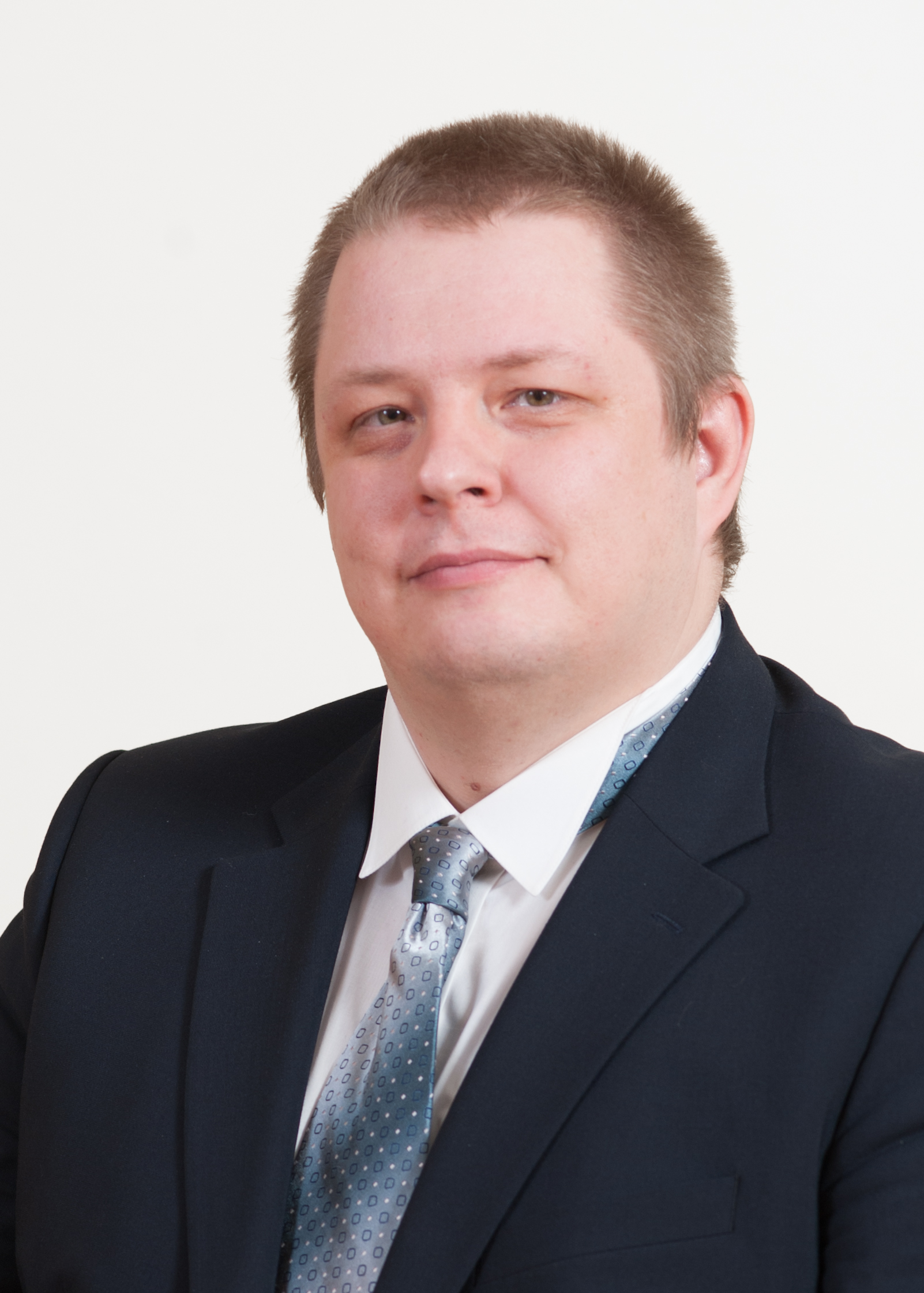
Erki Savisaar

Erki Savisaar (born 16 June 1978) is an Estonian politician. Born in Vastse-Kuuste, Põlva County, he has been a member of the XIII and XIV Riigikogu.

Savisaar is the son of former Prime Minister of Estonia Edgar Savisaar. In 2003, he graduated from Tallinn University with a degree in applied informatics.

From 2012 to 2015, he was the head of Tallinna Linnatranspordi AS's IT Department.

Since 2015, he has been a member of Estonian Centre Party.

In 2018, he received the Baltic Assembly Medal.
