= Tiit Arge =

Estonian politician (born 1963)

Tiit Arge (born 29 May 1963 in Tallinn) is an Estonian politician. He was a member of VII Riigikogu.
