= Ülo Laanoja =

Estonian politician (born 1953)

Ülo Laanoja (born 19 February 1953 Kanepi Selsoviet, Põlva District) is an Estonian politician. He was a member of VII Riigikogu.
