= Aap Neljas =

Estonian politician (born 1967)

Aap Neljas (born 16 August 1967 Tallinn) is an Estonian politician. He was a member of VII Riigikogu.
