= Mart Nutt =

Estonian politician and historian (1962–2019)

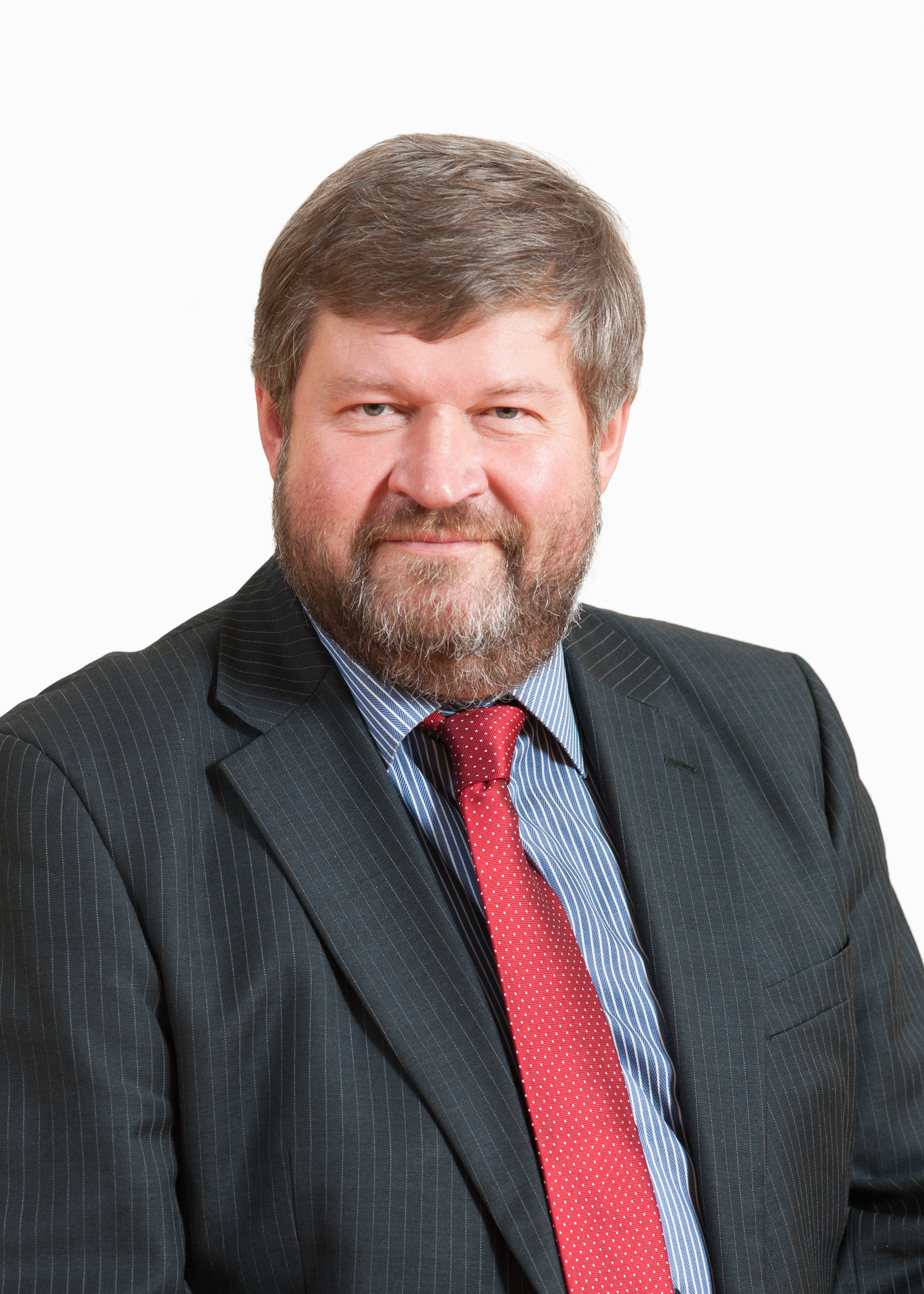
Mart Nutt (2015)

Mart Nutt (21 March 1962 – 2 June 2019) was an Estonian politician and historian, member of the XIV Riigikogu since he was elected in the 2019 Estonian parliamentary election.

== Education ==
In 1980, Nutt graduated from Tallinn Nõmme Gymnasium and later from Tartu University in 1985 with a Master's degree in History and Ethnography. In 1988 he received a PhD. On 16 December 2011, he defended his PhD thesis in Tallinn University of Technology on the topic "Power of Estonian Parliament, the Formation and Implementation of the Foreign Relations".

== Work ==
From 1988 to 1991, Nutt was a research director of the Estonian Open Air Museum. From 1991 to 1992, he was head of a department of Ministry of Foreign Affairs of Estonia. From 2003 to 2004, he was a research director at the Jaan Tõnisson Institute. In 2011, he became a member of the council at the Institute of Human Rights.

== Politics ==
He became famous in 1989 in the Independent Youth Organization Res Publica and in 1990 among initiators and founders of The Republican National Coalition. He joined the Pro Patria and Res Publica Union party in 1990. From 1992 onwards, Nutt served as a member of the Riigikogu and was a part of the Tallinn City council from 1993 to 1999. He was included in all configurations of the Constitutional Committee of the Riigikogu (VII Riigikogu Committee) and European Union Affairs. Nutt was a board member of Pro Patria and Res Publica Union, Jaan Tõnisson Institute, Migration Fund and Estonian Defence League.

At the Estonian parliamentary election in 2011 he was nominated in Mustamäe and Nõmme districts. He collected 1,968 votes in a losing effort.

== Social activities ==
He was a member of the United Nations Human Rights Council in 2007 and of the European Commission against Racism and Intolerance beginning in 1998. He was the curator of Estonian Academy of Arts. He served in the Estonian Reserve Officer Association and the Toompea National Defence with the rank of lieutenant.

== Orders ==
- 2001: 5th class of the Order of the National Coat of Arms (received 23 February 2001)
- 2018: 2nd class of the Order of the National Coat of Arms (received 21 February 2018)

== Publications ==
=== Books ===
- "Estonian History VI. War for independence".
- "Present Estonia and political system".

=== Articles ===
- Linnart Mall - Authoritarian Democrat
- Estonia is a business, social, or nation-state?
- Arabic puzzles
- Change of state regime
