= Riivo Sinijärv =

Estonian politician (born 1947)

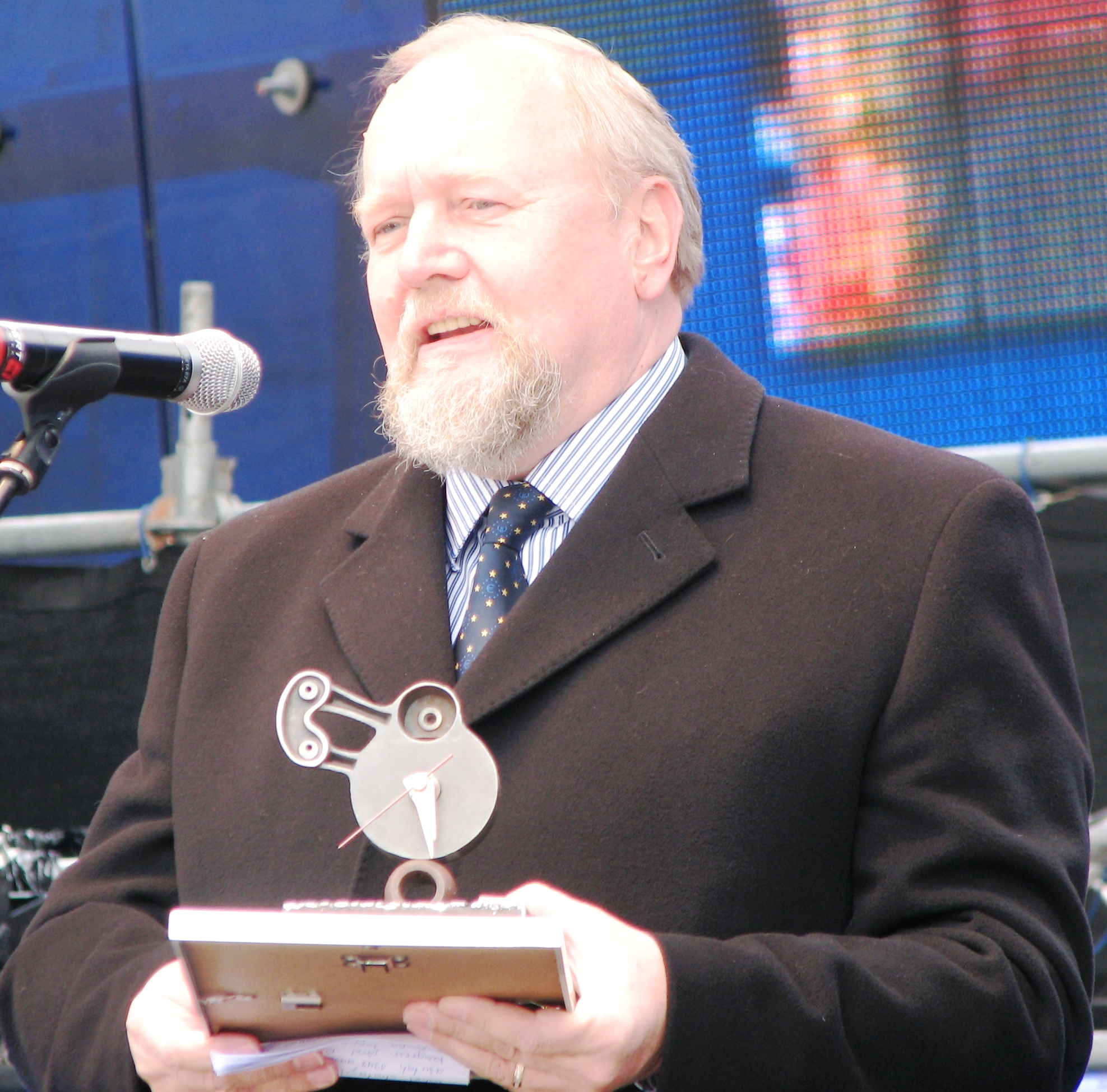
- Riivo Sinijärv in 2010.

Minister of Foreign Affairs
- In office April 1995 – November 1995
- Prime Minister: Tiit Vähi
- Preceded by: Jüri Luik
- Succeeded by: Siim Kallas

Personal details
- Born: 27 May 1947 (age 78) Tallinn, then part of Estonian SSR, Soviet Union
- Party: Estonian Coalition Party

Riivo Sinijärv (born 27 May 1947 in Tallinn) is an Estonian politician and a former Minister of Foreign Affairs.

Sinijärv is the father of poet and journalist Karl Martin Sinijärv.

Political offices
Preceded by Jüri Luik	Minister of Foreign Affairs; April 1995 – November 1995	Succeeded by Siim Kallas
Preceded by Märt Rask	Minister of Interior; 1996–1997	Succeeded by Robert Lepikson
