= Tõnu-Reid Kukk =

Estonian politician

Tõnu-Reid Kukk (3 April 1939 – 15 September 2011) was an Estonian politician. He was born in Tallinn. Reid-Kukk was a member of VII and VIII Riigikogu.
