= Kalev Kukk =

Estonian geographer and politician

Kalev Kukk (born 3 June 1951, Tallinn) is an Estonian geographer and politician. Kukk was Estonia's Minister of Roads and Communications (1995–1996). He was also a member of VII Riigikogu.
