= 1992 Estonian parliamentary election =

- 20 September 1992
- All 101 seats in the Riigikogu; 51 seats needed for a majority
Party	Leader	Vote %	Seats
Pro Patria	Mart Laar	22.00	29
Safe Home	Riivo Sinijärv	13.60	17
Popular Front	Edgar Savisaar	12.25	15
Moderates	Marju Lauristin	9.73	12
ERSP	Jüri Adams	8.79	10
Royalists	Kalle Kulbok	7.12	8
EK	Tiina Benno	6.89	8
Greens	Jüri Liim	2.62	1
EEE	Tiit Made	2.39	1
This lists parties that won seats. See the complete results below.
Results by electoral district
Prime Minister of the Interim Government before	Prime Minister after election
Tiit Vähi	Mart Laar; Bloc "Fatherland"

Parliamentary elections were held in Estonia alongside presidential elections on 20 September 1992, the first after regaining independence from the Soviet Union. The newly elected 101 members of the 7th Riigikogu assembled at Toompea Castle in Tallinn within ten days of the election. Following the elections, the five-party Fatherland Bloc led by Mart Laar formed a government together with national-conservative Estonian National Independence Party and centrist Moderates alliance. Voter turnout was 68%.

== Electoral system ==
Estonia used a combination of instant-runoff voting (for president) and single transferable vote (for legislators) — a system that had been popularized by Rein Taagepera, an expatriate Estonian political scientist at the University of California.

== Campaign ==
Several alliances were formed prior to the elections.

Alliance	Members	Ideology
Fatherland Bloc	Christian Democratic Party, Conservative People's Party, Christian Democratic Union, Republican Coalition Party, Liberal Democrat Party	Radical pro-reform, Estonian nationalism, Conservatism
Estonian Citizen	Party of the Estonian Republic, Society of Healthy Lifestyle of Noarootsi	Estonian nationalism
Greens	Party of Estonian Greens, Estonian Green Movement, European Youth Forest Action, Green Maardu Association, Green Regiment	Green politics
Left Option	Democratic Labour Party	Democratic socialism
Moderates	Social Democratic Party, Estonian Rural Centre Party	Centrism
Popular Front	Centre Party, Popular Front, Association of Estonian Nationalities, Union of Estonian Women	Moderate pro-reform
Safe Home	Coalition Party, Country People's Union	Centrism, Liberalism

== Conduct ==
Several issues were recorded during the elections; numerous people voted in a booth at the same time while other voters failed to keep their votes secret, causing inconsistencies. Officials also failed to standardize the voting materials and ballot-counting. The existence of a preliminary two-week voting period also led to concerns about ballot security among officials.

The most difficult aspect of the elections was the matter of citizenship and who was eligible to vote. In order to be considered a citizen, people had to prove that they, their parents, or their grandparents were citizens of the pre-World War II Republic of Estonia. This was extremely difficult, as many families had no documentation of their citizenship. Non-citizens had to have lived in Estonia for two years, passed a test, and waited another year in order to be considered for citizenship. This made voting nearly impossible for some individuals. Outside the capital, officials determined who was or was not a citizen in a process that took 10–15 minutes, but in Tallinn, the process was more extensive as the necessary officials were not near the voting booths. This led to embarrassment on behalf of the officials and frustration by the voters, many of whom never cast their vote because of the hassle of proving citizenship.

Despite these issues, the elections were largely conducted smoothly and cooperatively. There were concerns about the Russian minority within Estonia as tensions were high due to new definitions of citizenship, but confrontation was avoided. Ambassadors representing the Russian minority gave statements and held interviews to assure the public that they were open to communication and wished to arrive at a mutually beneficial solution.

== Results ==
Parties like the Popular Front of Estonia and the Estonian National Independence Party had achieved great success during the Singing Revolution and attempted to capitalize on this success during the elections. The well-established parties fared poorly, as they were unable to adapt and appeared conservative compared to new parties such as the Estonian Citizen and Fatherland Bloc. Following the elections, the Popular Front disbanded.

The frivolous Independent Royalist Party of Estonia surprisingly gained eight seats in the new parliament; a satirical party that campaigned with the stated intention to establish Estonia as a monarchy, they spent one kroon on their election campaign.

Although the Greens and Estonian Entrepreneurs' Party did not cross the electoral threshold, a candidate from each party received enough votes in their constituency to be elected through an individual mandate.

Party	Votes	%	Seats
Fatherland Bloc	100,828	22.00	29
Safe Home	62,329	13.60	17
Popular Front of Estonia	56,124	12.25	15
Moderates (ESDP–EMK)	44,577	9.73	12
Estonian National Independence Party	40,260	8.79	10
Independent Royalist Party	32,638	7.12	8
Estonian Citizen	31,553	6.89	8
Estonian Union of Pensioners	17,011	3.71	0
Farmers' Assembly	13,356	2.91	0
Greens	12,009	2.62	1
Estonian Entrepreneurs' Party	10,946	2.39	1
Left Option	7,374	1.61	0
National Party of the Illegally Repressed	4,263	0.93	0
Handicapped Union	2,262	0.49	0
Mercy	1,852	0.40	0
The Democrats	744	0.16	0
Natural Law Party	368	0.08	0
Independents	19,753	4.31	0
Total	458,247	100.00	101
Valid votes	458,247	97.99	
Invalid/blank votes	9,381	2.01	
Total votes	467,628	100.00	
Registered voters/turnout	689,241	67.85	
Source: Nohlen & Stöver

== See also ==
- Members of the 7th Riigikogu
