= Tiit Made =

Estonian politician (born 1940)

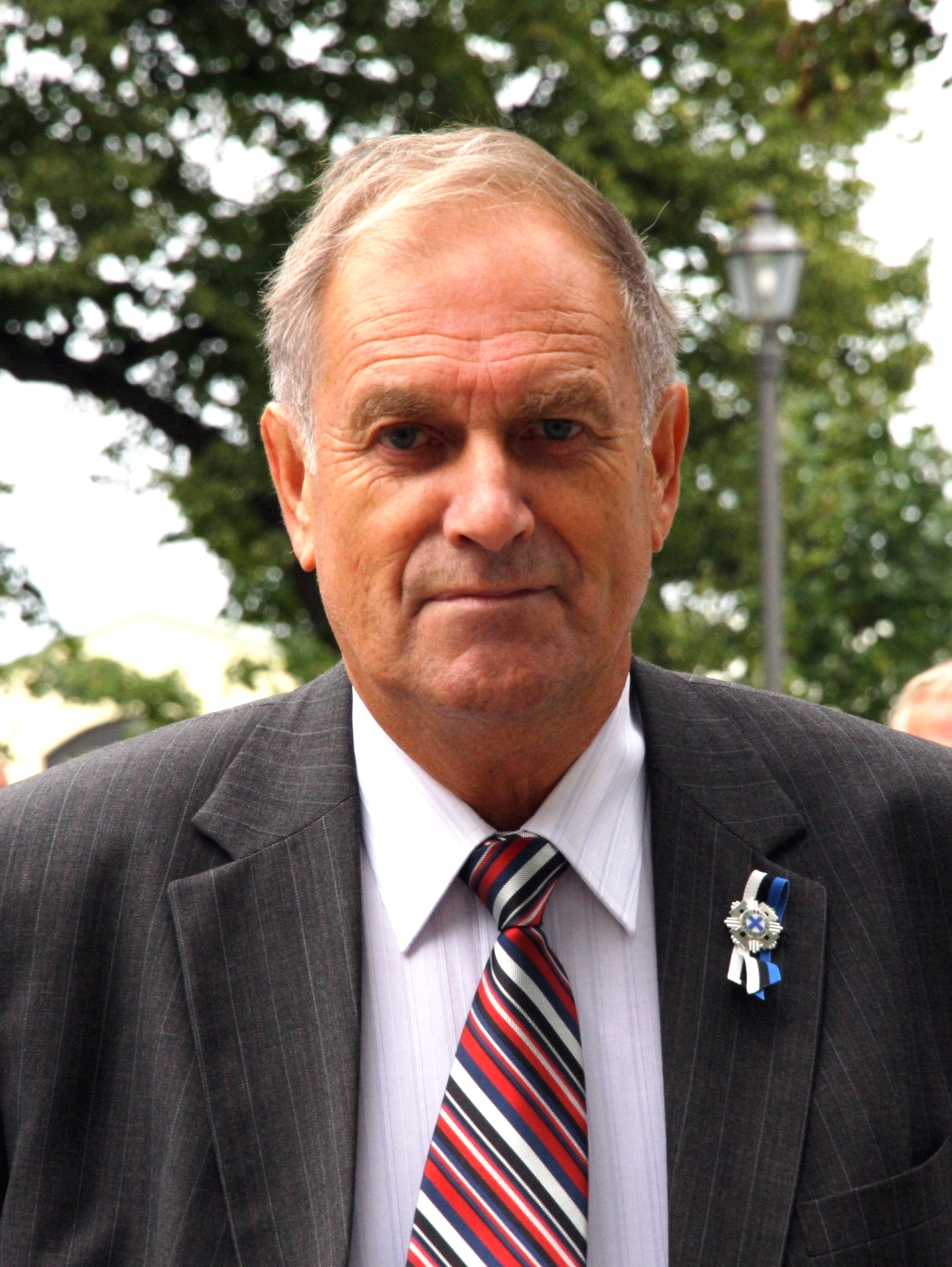
Tiit Made in 2011

Tiit Made (13 March 1940) is an Estonian politician. He was a writer of the Four-Man Proposal in 1987, and he served in the VII Riigikogu and VIII Riigikogu from 1992 to 1999.

== Early life ==
Tiit Made was born in Tallinn on 13 March 1940. Made attended the Tallinn Polytechnical Institute, where he graduated with a degree in economics in 1965. He then attended Moscow State University, teaching at the Tallinn Polytechnical Institute at the same time. He graduated with a candidate degree in economics in 1971 and joined the Communist Party of Estonia that same year. Made worked as the Soviet Union's consular attaché to Sweden from 1974 to 1977. Then from 1979 to 1984 he was director of the State Planning Committee of the Information Institute of the ESSR. Over the following years, he taught at the Institute of Qualification and the Teachers Continuing Education Institute, and he appeared as a commentator on Eesti Raadio and Eesti Televisioon.

== Political career ==
Made was a writer of the Four-Man Proposal of 27 September 1987, and he co-founded the Estonian Green Movement in 1988. In 1989, he was elected president of the Federation of Estonian Cooperatives and Private Entrepreneurs and elected to the Supreme Soviet of the Soviet Union, and he resigned from teaching. While in the Supreme Soviet, he was on the Foreign Affairs Committee.

Made co-founded the Estonian Entrepreneurs Party in 1990 and became its inaugural chairman. That year, he was elected to the Supreme Soviet of the ESSR. The year 1991 marked Made's resignations from the Supreme Soviet of the Soviet Union and from the chairmanship of the Estonian Entrepreneurs Party. Made was then elected to the VII Riigikogu in 1992. His term as president of the Federation of Estonian Cooperatives and Private Entrepreneurs ended in 1994. He was reelected to the VIII Riigikogu in 1995, but he lost reelection to the IX Riigikogu in 1999. He then resumed his career as a teacher and a journalist.
