= Pro Patria National Coalition Party =

Defunct Estonian political party

Pro Patria National Coalition Party (Rahvuslik Koonderakond Isamaa - RKEI) was an Estonian political party founded in 1992. In 1995, it merged with the Estonian National Independence Party into Pro Patria Union.

The Pro Patria National Coalition was founded in September, 1992: it was an electoral alliance between four political parties:

- Christian Democratic Party (Kristlik-demokraatlik Erakond);
- Christian Democratic Union (Kristlik-Demokraatlik Liit);
- Conservative People's Party (Konservatiivne Rahvaerakond);
- Republicans' Coalition Party (Vabariiklaste Koonderakond).

The coalition had 22.0% votes and 29 seats in 1992 parliamentary elections.

Conservative People's Party and Republicans' Coalition Party left the alliance during 1994 and formed the People's Party of Republicans and Conservatives.

The party formed a coalition with the Estonian National Independence Party, which obtained 7.9% votes and 8 seats in the 1995 parliamentary election. The two parties merged definitely in 1995.

Toivo Jürgenson was elected the first Chairman of RKEI. He served in this position till 1998 and later became Minister of Transportation and Communications.
