= Edgar Savisaar =

Estonian politician (1950–2022)

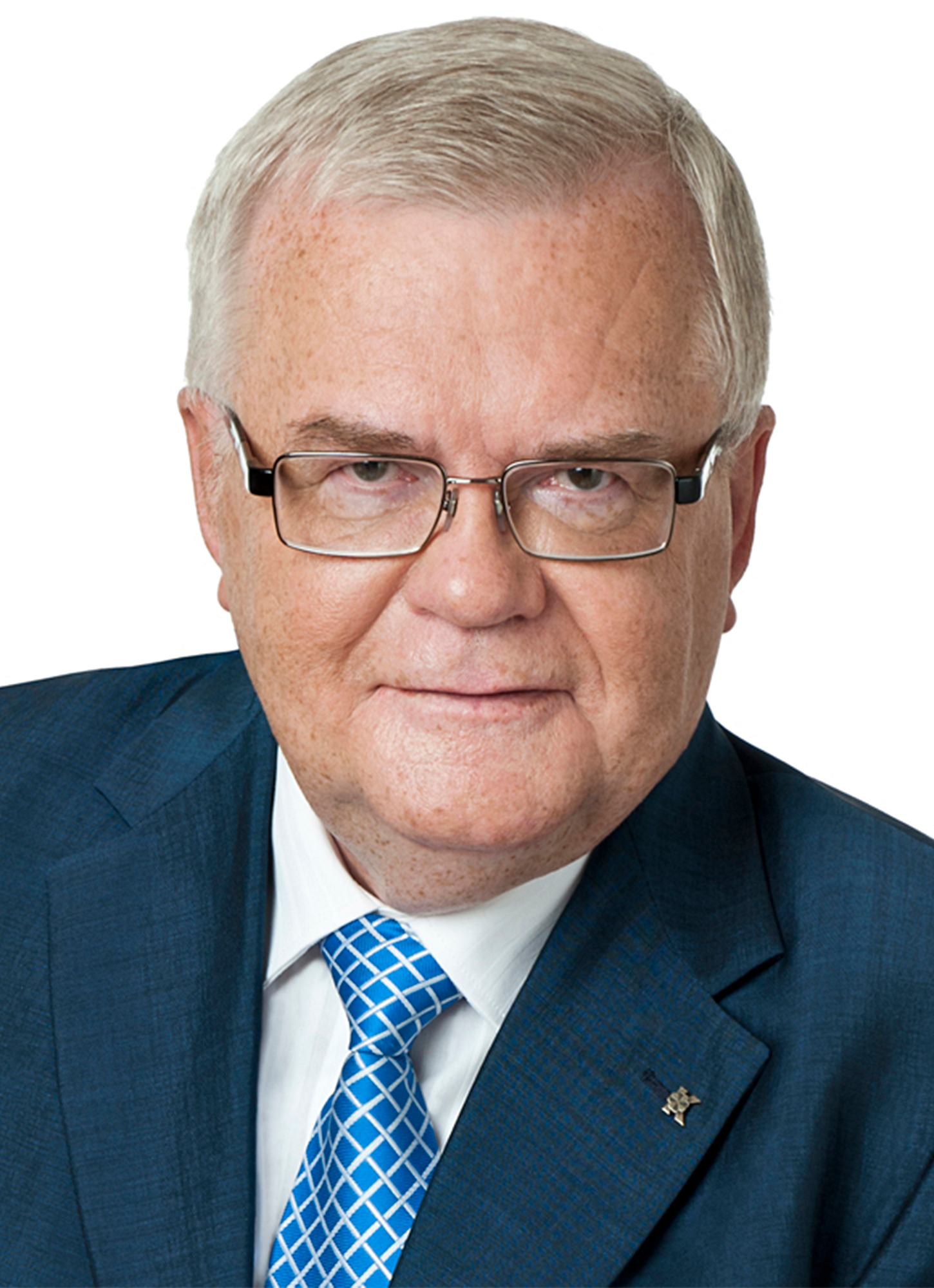
- Savisaar in 2013

Prime Minister of the Interim Government of Estonia
- In office 20 August 1991 – 29 January 1992
- President: Arnold Rüütel as Chairman of the Supreme Soviet (1990) as Chairman of the Supreme Council (1990–1992)
- Preceded by: position established; Otto Tief as last acting Prime Minister in 1944
- Succeeded by: Tiit Vähi

Minister of the Interior
- In office 12 April 1995 – 10 October 1995
- Prime Minister: Tiit Vähi
- Preceded by: Kaido Kama
- Succeeded by: Märt Rask

Mayor of Tallinn
- In office 9 April 2007 – 9 November 2017
- Preceded by: Jüri Ratas
- Succeeded by: Taavi Aas
- In office 13 December 2001 – 14 October 2004
- Preceded by: Tõnis Palts
- Succeeded by: Tõnis Palts

Minister of Economic Affairs and Communications
- In office 12 April 2005 – 5 April 2007
- Prime Minister: Andrus Ansip
- Preceded by: Andrus Ansip
- Succeeded by: Juhan Parts

Personal details
- Born: 31 May 1950 Harku, then part of Estonian SSR, Soviet Union
- Died: 29 December 2022 (aged 72) Tallinn, Estonia
- Party: Soviet Communist Party (1983–1988); Popular Front (1988–1991); Centre Party (1991–2022)
- Spouse: Vilja Laanaru (m. 1996; div. 2009)
- Children: 4, including Erki
- Education: University of Tartu

Edgar Savisaar (31 May 1950 – 29 December 2022) was an Estonian politician, one of the founding members of Popular Front of Estonia and the Centre Party. He served as the acting Prime Minister of Estonia, Minister of the Interior, Minister of Economic Affairs and Communications, and twice mayor of Tallinn.

== Early life and education ==
Savisaar was born in the Harku Prison in 1950. His parents Elmar Savisaar (1911–1970) and Marie Savisaar née Burešin (1912–1984) were farmers from Vastse-Kuuste, Tartu County, who both had been convicted in 1949 of resisting collectivization. The events, which had culminated with physical conflict, had started when kolhoz activists came to nationalise Savisaar couple's two cows (named Marja and Oksa), a pig, a horse drawn hay rake, a spring-tooth harrow, and other farming equipment. Elmar was sentenced to 15 years and Marie to 5 years in prison. In the autumn of 1950, Marie was released from prison under an amnesty and returned to Vastse-Kuuste with her son. In 1952, Elmar was acquitted of one of the offences, and the sentence for the second episode was reduced to 2.5 years, which was deemed to have been served, and he was released from prison.

After graduating from high school, Savisaar continued his studies at the University of Tartu. In 1973, he graduated from the university with a degree in history. In 1980, he wrote his candidate thesis in philosophy on the topic "Social Philosophical Foundations of the Global Models of the Club of Rome".

== Career ==
From 1980 to 1988, Savisaar worked in the Soviet Estonian governmental institutions dealing with planning of the economy. During 1988–1989, he was the academic director for the consultancy firm "Mainor".

In April he co-established the Popular Front (Rahvarinne) which became the first mass political organization in the Soviet Union outside of the Communist Party since 1920. Initially formed to support perestroika, the Popular Front eventually developed ideas of Estonian national independence. This process among several others led to dissolution of the Soviet Union.

In 1989, he became the vice-chairman of the Council of Ministers of Estonian SSR and the Head of the State Planning Committee. In 1990, he was the Minister of Economic Affairs. On 3 April 1990, he was appointed the Chairman of the Council of Ministers. When Estonia regained its independence on 20 August 1991, he became the first Prime Minister of the Interim Government of the Republic of Estonia. His government was in office until 29 January 1992, when he resigned after supplementary problems and a continuing decline in economy. Most of his governing time was characterized by hyperinflation and ever increasing deficit of goods. "Purchase cards" and ration stamps were introduced. During the winter of 1991/1992 preparations were made to evacuate the dormitory regions of Tallinn due to shortage of fuel. On 31 December 1991, people stood for hours in the bread queues, many were eventually left without bread. In January 1992, butter disappeared from the shops. Savisaar managed to win a vote of non-confidence, being mostly supported by his Popular Front, left-wing parties and the Intermovement, but stepped down when it turned out impossible to introduce a state of emergency. He was replaced by a technocratic government under Tiit Vähi.

From 1992 until 1995, Savisaar was the Vice-Speaker of the Estonian Parliament (Riigikogu). From 17 April to 6 November 1995, he was the Minister for Internal Affairs. When he was accused of recording private conversations of other politicians, the entire government faltered. Although his participation in the recordings was never proved, he announced his intention to leave politics. However, in 1996, he participated in the local municipalities elections and became the chairman of the Tallinn City Council. His return to the Centre Party leader's post evoked a split, as some leading members disillusioned with Savisaar's leadership style left to found Arengupartei. From 2001 to 14 October 2004, he was mayor of Tallinn. On 11 April 2005, he became Minister of Economic Affairs and Communications in the new coalition of Prime Minister Andrus Ansip and worked in the post until March 2007. Since 2007 he has been mayor of Tallinn, the capital of Estonia.

Edgar Savisaar and Estonia People's Union leader Villu Reiljan jointly supported Arnold Rüütel's candidature for presidency in August–September 2006; Toomas Hendrik Ilves was elected though, a choice criticised by Savisaar and attributed by him to alleged hostile media and partisan lawmakers. Savisaar refused to congratulate the winner.

In 2016, the discussion on electing a new leader escalated in the Centre Party and an extraordinary party congress was called for November. MP Jüri Ratas was the first to announce his candidacy, after which four others followed, including Yana Toom. Even though Savisaar first announced his candidacy, he later announced that he would not participate in the leadership election and instead endorsed Toom.

Savisaar published four books. He received the Order of the National Coat of Arms 2nd Class in 2001 and 1st Class in 2006 from Estonia and the Order of the Three Stars 2nd Class in 2005 from Latvia.

== Controversy ==
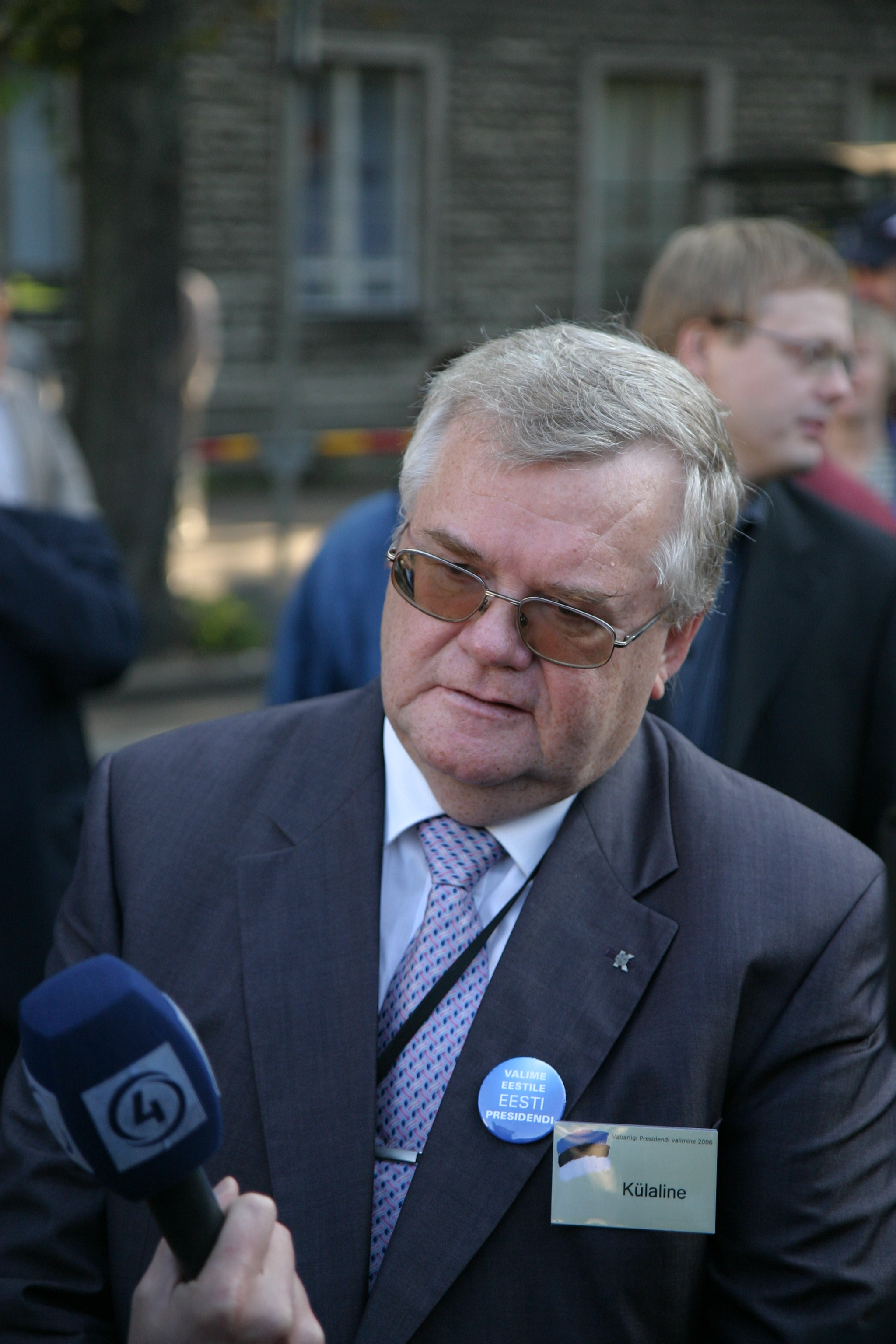
Savisaar giving an interview during the 2006 presidential election

Savisaar was one of the most controversial politicians in Estonia. While some people, including many from the Russian-speaking minority, saw him as a defender of the poor, his political opponents accused him of authoritarianism, nepotism, corruption, destructive intrigues, and having close ties with some Russian politicians. The latter accusation was fuelled by the Centre Party's collaboration agreement with Putin's United Russia party, particularly since the agreement's content was not made public. Savisaar was often associated with using Machiavellian politics and deals to achieve his goals, such as taping other politicians, which caused the so-called tape scandal in 1995; and while being the mayor of the Estonian capital Tallinn, real-estate deals that were good for the members of the Centre Party, but were bad for the town.

=== Tape scandal ===
On 22 September 1995, a tape scandal broke out in Estonia when Edgar Savisaar was accused of secretly recording political consultations with Prime Minister Tiit Vähi and the chairman of the Reform Party, Siim Kallas, after the 1995 parliamentary elections.

The scandal began with audio cassettes found during a search. Conversations between politicians were recorded there. As a result of the tape scandal, the coalition government of KMÜ and the Center Party collapsed and KMÜ chose the Reform Party as a new coalition partner. Savisaar denied the allegations. Vilja Laanaru, Savisaar's assistant at the time, took over the responsibility for recording.

=== Bronze Night and riots ===
During the events surrounding the Bronze Soldier, Edgar Savisaar spoke out against the removal of the monument and accused Andrus Ansip of deliberate attempts of splitting the Estonian society by provoking the Russian minority. In response to this many government officials and public figures stated distrust and disrespect towards him.

In relation to his reactions to the Bronze Soldier controversy, the Estonian Patriotic Movement created on 29 April 2007 an online petition website www.mahasavisaar.com to suggest resignation of Savisaar's position as the Mayor of Tallinn. It ended on 9 May 2007 and had collected 98,200 e-mail addresses (not signatures, although organizers of petition claimed so). In 2009 being a candidate for EP elections collected 103506 votes in closed list system.

=== Allegations of receiving Russian money ===
On 10–11 May 2010, Edgar Savisaar and Vladimir Velman, a member of the Riigikogu Central Group, visited Moscow, where the visit of Vladimir Jakunin, the head of the Russian Railways, to Estonia was agreed.

On 23-24 Vladimir Jakunin's visit to Estonia took place in June. On the morning of 24 June, a boat trip was organized for the guests in the Gulf of Tallinn. During the amusement ride, Jakunin informed Borodich, who had also come to Estonia, of the fact that "the requested three will not be received, but will be 1.5".

During the cultural program, they visited the Kiltsi manor complex in Lääne-Virumaa. In the manor complex, Edgar Savisaar, Denis Borodich, Vladimir Bushushev, Sergei Petrov and Vladimir Yakunin separated for a conversation. During the conversation, Jakunin said that 1.5 million euros will be given to the Center Party to support the Estonian parliamentary elections. 1/3 of it is given in cash, 2/3 by transfer invoices. Jakunin also reminded all participants that no one should talk about the transaction anywhere. During the conversation, Petrov on the one hand and Borodich on the other were appointed the persons responsible for the transfer and legalization of money.

On 13 September, during the visit of Edgar Savisaar and Denis Borodich to Moscow, a dinner was held at the residence of the Russian Railways, which was attended by Yakunin, Bushushev, Borodich and Savisaar. Several topics were discussed during the dinner. Among other things, the following were discussed: the financing of the Lasnamäe church, the course of the church's construction work, the timing of the various stages of the construction work in connection with the forthcoming Riigikogu elections, their connection to the elections; how can Russia, at the official level, by sending its representatives, support the holding of the Congress of Rural People organized by the Center Party in Estonia. In addition to the above, the financing scheme of the Center Party was also discussed at dinner. Edgar Savisaar confirmed what was agreed in Kiltsi manor: 1/3 in cash and 2/3 by transfer, admitting that paying the entire amount in cash would also be solvable. Subsequently, Jakunin demanded full respect in future dealings with each other, referring to his long-term operational experience. The requirement was a total ban on the use of telephones to discuss the allocation of funds, to arrange meetings and on other sensitive issues.

During a conversation with KAPO on 3 November, Savisaar's attention was drawn to the possibility of complicity with him and the party related to asking for money from abroad and to the resulting security threats. On 4 November, KAPO officials conducted a similar conversation with Borodich, who had been on holiday so far. On 6 November 2010, a telephone conversation took place between Savisaar and Jakunin, where the need to sign a tripartite agreement to legalize money allocated for the support of Lasnamäe Church and to prevent a possible scandal was discussed. On 26 November 2010, the financing agreement for Lasnamäe Church was signed. To this end, Vladimir Bushuev arrived in Tallinn from Moscow, accompanied by an agreement signed by the President of the Andrei Pervozvanny Foundation, Sergei Shcheblygin, in Moscow. Jevgeni Tomberg collected the signatures of the agreement from the representatives of the Tallinn City Government and MPEÕK. The next day, Mayor Edgar Savisaar presented the agreement to the Tallinn City Government.

=== Bribery allegations ===
On 17 July 2015, Estonian Internal Security Service launched a criminal investigation on Savisaar and six others in relation to bribery allegations. He is suspected of accepting bribes with a value of hundreds of thousands of euros in 2014 and 2015 on behalf of himself and Estonian Centre Party. It was later revealed that Savisaar was also suspected of corruption and money laundering. Because of the ongoing investigation, Savisaar was suspended from mayor's office on 30 September 2015. His original trial commenced in Harju County Court in June 2017. The county court ended the proceedings in June 2018 due to Savisaar's medical condition, however in August a higher circuit court ordered the trial to resume. In December 2018, the Supreme Court of Estonia annulled the ruling of the circuit court, thus releasing Savisaar from criminal proceedings.

=== Statements in support of EKRE ===
After Jüri Ratas formed a coalition government with EKRE, scandals started to follow due to statements and actions made and done by the then-party leader and Interior Minister Mart Helme and his son Martin Helme. After being asked to comment on EKRE, Savisaar deflected to the media and accused the news media of stirring up controversy against EKRE, saying "Too much damage is being done to EKRE".

=== Joining an anti-vaccination party ===
For the 2021 Estonian municipal elections, Savisaar joined an electoral alliance called Vaba Eesti (Free Estonia) which had been accused of being anti-vaccination in its platform. Savisaar rejected the attacks, however, saying on Facebook "In my opinion, they are not some kind of anti-vaccine party, but they have a wide platform, starting with Estonia's internal affairs and ending with their attitude towards the European Union. I'm vaccinated and happy with that. But I am opposed to it being forced with dismissal from work. I hope that the problem of vaccination will remain temporary. The loss of human freedoms is a more far-reaching threat". The statement was slammed by people from his old Centre Party as well as other parties, with one of his previously closest allies Priit Toobal saying in September on his Facebook page "The electoral alliance you have been dragged into is not serious. Even on April 3 that you posted a snippet of text and a video clip right here on Facebook, where you can't rule out that vaccination should have been introduced, but now you're in the same room with the anti-vaxxers".

== Personal life ==
Edgar Savisaar married three times and was the father of four children. From his marriage to Kaire Savisaar he had a son Erki Savisaar, who is a Centre Party politician. From his marriage to Liis Remmel (then Liis Savisaar), he had a daughter Maria and son Edgar. The last marriage was to Vilja Toomast (then Vilja Savisaar), who is also an Estonian politician. They had a daughter, Rosina. The couple announced their separation and divorce in December 2009.

== Death ==
In March 2015, Savisaar was hospitalized due to an infection of streptococcus bacteria in his right leg which had to be amputated above the knee. He contracted the disease during a trip in Thailand.

Savisaar's health never recovered from the event. In 2018 Savisaar was freed from political corruption trial as court determined him seriously ill and thus unable to stand trial or carry a punishment if convicted.

Savisaar died on 29 December 2022, at the age of 72.

A state funeral was held for Savisaar at the Concert Hall of the Estonia Theatre in central Tallinn.

Political offices
Preceded by Indrek Toome	Prime Minister of the Estonian Soviet Socialist Republic; 1990–1991	Position abolished
Vacant Title next held by Otto Tief	Prime Minister of Estonia; 1991–1992	Succeeded by Tiit Vähi
Preceded by Kaido Kama	Minister of the Interior; 1995	Succeeded by Märt Rask
Preceded by Tõnis Palts	Mayor of Tallinn; 2001–2004	Succeeded by Tõnis Palts
Preceded by Andrus Ansip	Minister of Economic Affairs and Communications; 2005–2007	Succeeded by Juhan Parts
Preceded by Jüri Ratas	Mayor of Tallinn; 2007–2015	Succeeded by Taavi Aas
