= Electoral districts of Estonia =

The Estonian Riigikogu, or Parliament, is made up of 101 members, elected from 12 separate geographic areas, or electoral districts. The constituency division is based on the counties of Estonia, of which some are combined or divided depending on the size of the population. The capital city Tallinn is divided into three electoral districts based on administrative districts within the city. In the elections to the European Parliament, Estonia has only one national electoral district.

== Electoral districts ==
Electoral districts of Estonia

Electoral districts of Estonia
#	Area covered	Seats
1	Haabersti, Põhja-Tallinn and Kristiine districts of Tallinn	10
2	Kesklinn, Lasnamäe and Pirita districts of Tallinn	13
3	Mustamäe and Nõmme districts of Tallinn	8
4	Harju- (excl. Tallinn) and Raplamaa	16
5	Hiiu-, Lääne- and Saaremaa	6
6	Lääne-Virumaa	5
7	Ida-Virumaa	6
8	Järva- and Viljandimaa	6
9	Jõgeva- and Tartumaa (excl. Tartu)	8
10	Tartu	8
11	Võru-, Valga- and Põlvamaa	8
12	Pärnumaa	7
Total		101
