= Popular Front of Estonia =

Estonian political party

Popular Front of Estonia Eestimaa Rahvarinne
- Abbreviation: RR
- Leader: Edgar Savisaar
- Founded: 1 October 1988
- Dissolved: 13 November 1993
- Succeeded by: Estonian Centre Party
- Headquarters: Uus tänav 28, Tallinn
- Ideology: Pro-Perestroika; Social liberalism Environmentalism
- Political position: Centre to centre-left
- Colours: Blue
- Riigikogu (1992): 15 / 101

The Popular Front of Estonia (Estonian: Eestimaa Rahvarinne; RR), introduced to the public by the Estonian politician Edgar Savisaar under the short-lived name Popular Front for the Support of Perestroika, was a political organisation in Estonia in the late 1980s and early 1990s. Edgar Savisaar introduced the idea of popular front during a TV show on 13 April 1988. The idea was developed through the year and finally The Estonian Popular Front was established on 1 October 1988 with a massively crowded congress which turned to a culmination of the first phase of the Singing Revolution.

It was to a significant degree the precursor to the current Estonian Centre Party, although with a much broader base of popularity at the beginning.

== History ==
The Popular Front of Estonia was a major force in the Estonian independence movement that led to the re-establishment of the Republic of Estonia as a country independent from the Soviet Union. It was similar to the Popular Front of Latvia and the Sąjūdis movement in Lithuania and a number of Popular Fronts that were created almost simultaneously in many parts of the USSR. The Baltic States were in a unique category among the constituent parts of the USSR in that they had been European parliamentary democracies in the interbellum and had been annexed by the Soviet Union in 1940. The Popular Front of Estonia was founded in 1988 by Marju Lauristin and Edgar Savisaar. Savisaar initiated the founding in April 1988 in a live broadcast (Mõtleme veel) on Estonian TV, advocating support of Gorbachev’s perestroika.

Popular Front organised series of much-crowded and well-published events and actions which stressed on Estonian national pride but on democratic values as well. Huge amount of prints and newspapers were produced to popularise the PF movement. The top-leaders and sub-leaders of PF were everyday guests in every kind of media to talk about several kind of problems and ideas. Popular Front of Estonia made ideas of independent Estonia acceptable and possible for masses. The idea of independence had become a somewhat impossible and unbelievable dream for the majority of Estonians during decades under the Soviet Union.

At one point, the somewhat problematic character of Edgar Savisaar created growing opposition against PF among Estonians too. Those people formed their own smaller organisations which grew into important element of politics of independent Estonia next decade.

The Popular Front of Estonia together with the Popular Front of Latvia and the Sąjūdis organised the Baltic Way mass "arm-in-arm" manifestation extending through three Baltic states on 23 August 1989 that marked 50th anniversary of 23 August 1939, when the Soviet Union and Nazi Germany signed the Molotov–Ribbentrop Pact, which resulted in the forcible incorporation of these three states into the Soviet Union and the loss of their independence. The front was opposed by the Intermovement that represented the pro-Soviet part of Estonia's population including most of the country's Russian minority and other ethnic groups that had been settled in Estonia during the Soviet era. The Popular Front was a supporter of perestroika, while the Intermovement was seen as opposed to Gorbachev's reforms. As time went by, an ever-greater chasm developed between the initial thrust of the Popular Front, leading members of which at first advocated mere autonomy within a Soviet system that Gorbachev was trying to reform in a cautious way, and the eventual context of the Estonian Popular Front, which came to stand for true independence, an idea supported by the rank and file. Consequently, the Estonian Popular Front changed a great deal over time, until political parties came to replace such movements in Estonia during the early 1990s. This rendered the Popular Front of Estonia an anachronism, and Popular Front was dissolved in 1993.

== Election results ==
=== Supreme Council ===
Election year	Leader	Seats	+/–	Status
1990	Edgar Savisaar	43 / 105	New	Government

=== Riigikogu ===
Election year	Leader	Seats	+/–	Status
1992	Edgar Savisaar	15 / 101	▼28	Opposition

== See also ==
- BPF Party
- Democratic Russia
- Estonian National Independence Party
- People's Movement of Ukraine
- Popular Front of Latvia
- Popular Front of Moldova
- Sąjūdis
