= Estonian Coalition Party =

Estonian political party

Estonian Coalition Party Eesti Koonderakond (Estonian)
- Leader: Tiit Vähi; Mart Siimann
- Founded: 1991
- Dissolved: 2002
- Ideology: Liberalism; Social liberalism
- Political position: Centre
- International affiliation: Liberal International

Estonian Coalition Party (Estonian: Eesti Koonderakond) was an Estonian centre-right liberal political party. Founded in 1991 by Tiit Vähi, it disbanded in 2002. The party was an observing member of Liberal International from 1998 on. It had contacts with parties like Latvian Way and participated in the ruling coalition of 1995-1999. A party mostly uniting former (urban) nomenklatura and other Soviet era officials, it was closely allied with the Party of Rural People, which, however, represented more populist, centre-left ideology.

== Electoral results ==
=== Parliamentary elections ===
Election	Votes	%	Seats	+/–	Government
1992 (Note: as Safe Home (joint list with Country People's Union))	62,329	13.6 (#2)	17 / 101	17	Opposition
1995 (Note: with Country People's Union)	174,248	32.2 (#1)	41 / 101	▲24	Coalition
1999 (Note: with Estonian Country Union and Party of Estonian Pensioners and Families)	36,692	7.6 (#4)	7 / 101	▼34	Opposition
