= Estonian National Independence Party =

Political party in Estonia

The Estonian National Independence Party, or ENIP, (Estonian: Eesti Rahvusliku Sõltumatuse Partei, ERSP), founded on 20 August 1988 in Estonian SSR, was the first non-communist political party established in the former USSR. Founders of the party were nationalist and anti-communist dissidents.

The initiative to establish the Estonian independentist party came from Vello Väärtnõu, the leader of a local Buddhist group. On 30 January 1988 he organized a press conference in Moscow for Western media where he announced plans for the formation of the party, with the aim to restore the fully independent Republic of Estonia as a nation state on the restitution principle. This made the ENIP the most radical or political movement of its day. Väärtnõu and several fellow Buddhists were expelled from the Soviet Union shortly after the press conference. ENIP was officially founded in August 1988 in the village of Pilistvere in central Estonia.

ENIP represented the radical wing of the Estonian independence movement and used "hardline" anti-communist rhetoric, in contrast with the Popular Front that cooperated with pro-reform communists. The party gained a majority during the February 1990 elections of the Congress of Estonia. After Estonia regained independence in 1991, ENIP was part of the centre-right government from 1992 to 1995, and later merged with Pro Patria to form the Pro Patria Union, a national-conservative party.

== See also ==
- Rahvarinne, another major political movement of the era
- Latvian National Independence Movement, a similar organization in Latvia
