= 7th Riigikogu =

Parliament of Estonia 1992–1995

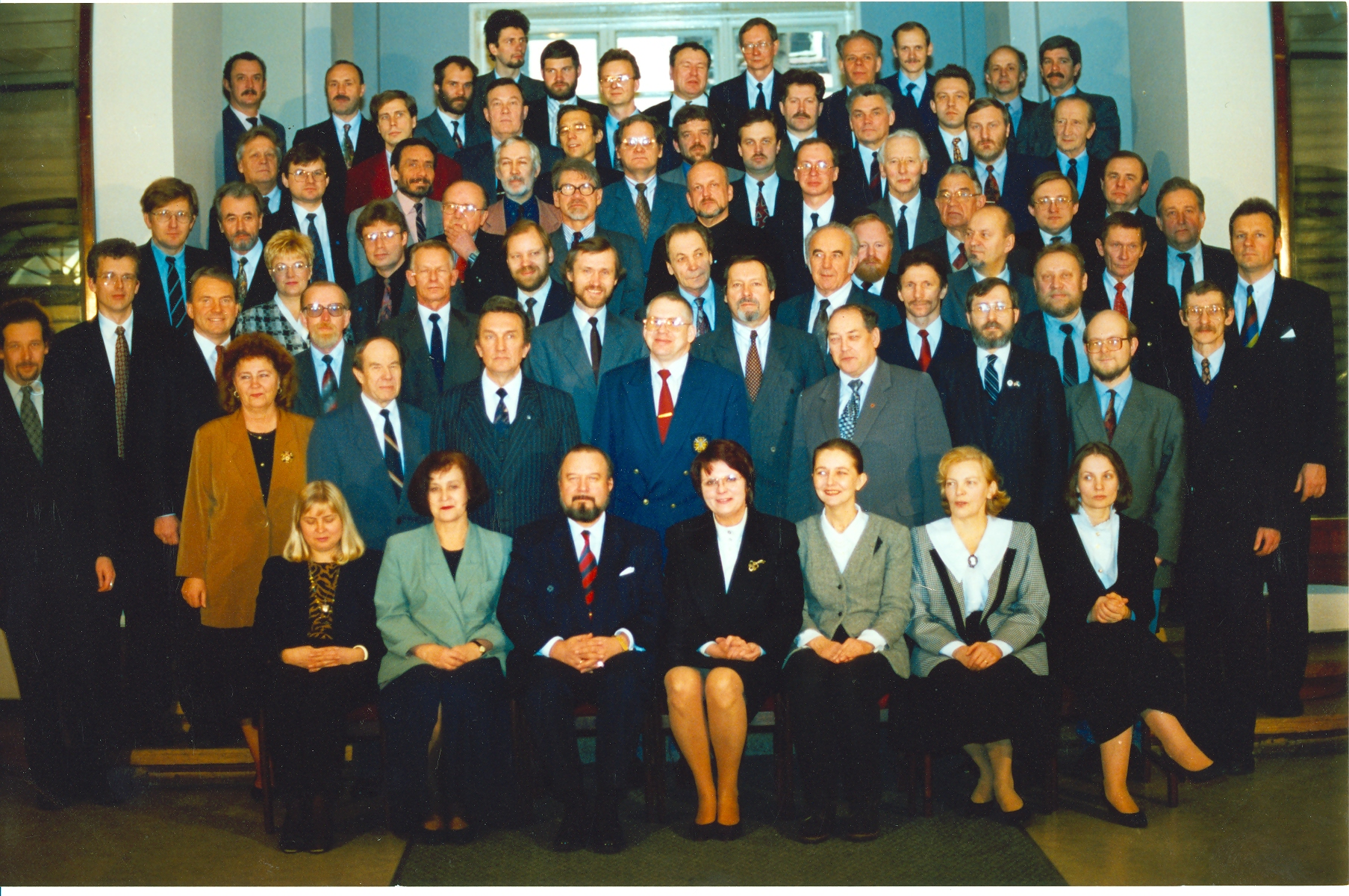
Joint picture of the composition of the VII Riigikogu, March 1 1995

The 7th Riigikogu was the seventh legislature of the Estonian Parliament (Riigikogu). The legislature was elected after 1992 election, the first after the Estonian Restoration of Independence.

== Election results ==
Results:

List	Votes	%	Seats
Alliance Isamaa	100 828	22,00%	29
Alliance Kindel Kodu	62 329	13,60%	17
Alliance Rahvarinne	56 124	12,25%	15
Alliance Mõõdukad	44 577	9,73%	12
Estonian National Independence Party (ERSP)	40 260	8,79%	10
Alliance Independent Royalist Party of Estonia	32 638	7,12%	8
Alliance Eesti Kodanik	31 553	6,89%	8
Alliance Rohelised	12 009	2,62%	1 (person mandate)
Eesti Ettevõtjate Erakond	10 946	2,39%	1 (person mandate)

== Officers ==
Speaker of the Riigikogu: Ülo Nugis. Deputy Speakers of the Riigikogu: Tunne Kelam, Edgar Savisaar
