= Eero Palm =

Estonian architect

Eero Palm (born 21 June 1974 in Tallinn) is an Estonian architect.

== Biography ==
Palm studied in the Tallinn University of Applied Sciences in the department of architecture. He graduated from the university in 1996.

Eero Palm works in the architectural bureau Palm-E OÜ.

Works by Eero Palm include the sports hall of A. Le Coq in Tartu, the office building in Meistri Street and the new sports hall of Pärnu. In addition Palm has designed numerous single-family homes. In 2006 Eero Palm received the Steel Building 2006 award for the A. Le Coq sports hall. Eero Palm is a member of the Union of Estonian Architects.

== Works ==
- West gas station in Haapsalu, 1996 (with Ain Padrik)
- Single-family home in Maarjamäe, 2000 (with Kristi Alamaa)
- Hotell Radisson SAS, 2001 (with Vilen Künnapu, Ain Padrik, Margus Maiste)
- Single-family home in Haabneeme, 2001
- Courthouse of Narva, 2004
- Office building on Meistri Street, 2004
- A. Le Coq Sport sports hall in Tartu, 2006
- New building of the Estonian Information Technology College, 2008
- Auriga shopping center Saaremaa, 2008
- Pärnu sports hall, 2009

== Sources ==
- Union of Estonian Architects, members
- Architectural Bureau Palm-E OÜ, architects
- Architectural Bureau Palm-E OÜ, works
