= Snail Tower =

Building in Tartu, Estonia

- Snail Tower
- Interactive map of the Snail Tower area

General information
- Coordinates: 58°22′35″N 26°44′09″E

Height
- Height: 8,998 m (29,521 ft)

Technical details
- Floor count: 23

Snail Tower (Estonian: Tigutorn) is an apartment building in Tartu, Estonia. The tower resembles a gastropod shell, hence the name "snail tower".

The tower was designed by Vilen Künnapu and Ain Padrik and was opened in 2008. The tower has 23 floors.
