= Festival della Scienza =

The Festival della Scienza is an annual science festival held in Genoa, Italy.

The festival was established in 2003 and is held annually between late October and early November in Genoa, where it features lectures, exhibitions, workshops, interactive paths and performances aligned with the theme of each edition.

The Festival della Scienza is one of the most important science communication events in Italy and is known internationally.

== History ==
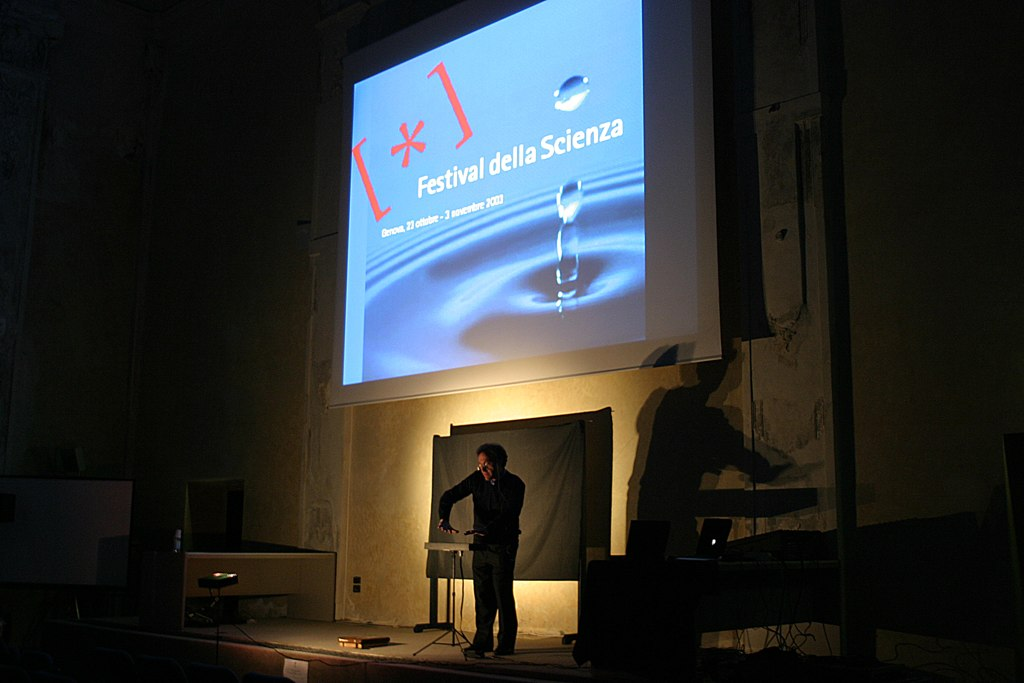
Festival della Scienza, 25 October 2003

The Festival della Scienza was founded in 2003 as a prelude to Genoa's designation as European Capital of Culture.

It is considered one of the earliest and most popular science communication festivals in the world, alongside the Edinburgh Science in Scotland and the World Science Festival in New York City, United States. The physicist Brian Greene, co-founder of the World Science Festival, stated that he found inspiration from visiting the Festival della Scienza in Genoa in 2005.

== Organisation ==
Since its first edition, the event has been organised by the Associazione Festival della Scienza, which actively involves national scientific bodies, local public institutions and several territorial companies, including the Municipality of Genoa and the National Research Council (CNR) as founding members.

The association's members include the Camera di Commercio of Genoa, the Enrico Fermi Historical Physics Museum and Research Centre, Confindustria Genova, Costa Edutainment, the Gran Sasso Science Institute, the Italian Institute of Technology, the National Institute of Geophysics and Volcanology, the National Institute for Astrophysics, the National Institute for Nuclear Physics, the Liguria Region and the University of Genoa.

Since the first edition, over ten thousand paid scientific explainers have been involved, whose role is to welcome and guide visitors through the festival's programme.

== Recognition ==
In 2006, the festival was selected among the ten best events in 31 countries in the field of promotion of scientific and technological culture in Europe.

In 2011, it received the Festival of Festival award in the categories "Best poster" and "Straight to the audience".

In 2017, the Festival was awarded a plaque by the President of the Italian Republic, Sergio Mattarella, and in 2018 it received the Presidential Medal as a representation prize.

== Editions ==
=== 2003: "Beyond" ===
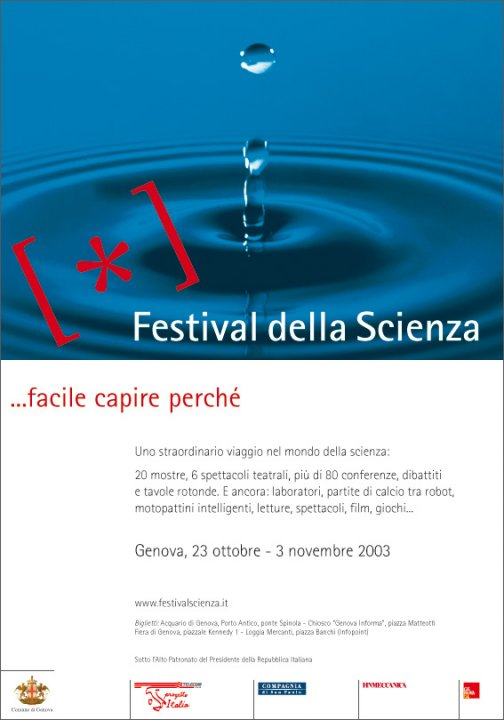
Beyond 2003

In its first edition, from 23 October to 3 November 2003, the Science Festival faces the theme of the interdisciplinarity of research, condensing the concept of a scientific culture in continuous expansion into the key word Beyond.
With the participation of :

- Niles Eldredge
- Ian Tattersall
- Luigi Luca Cavalli-Sforza
- Edoardo Boncinelli
- Margherita Hack
- Carlo Alberto Redi
- Vandana Shiva
- Franco Malerba
- Michael Nyman
- Roger Highfield
- Tullio Regge
- Giulio Giorello
- Piergiorgio Odifreddi
- Vittorio Sermonti
- Michele Emmer

=== 2004: "Exploration" ===
In its second edition, from 28 October to 8 November 2004, part of the calendar of official events of Genoa European Capital of Culture and into the events recognised by the European Union in the context of the European Week of Scientific Culture (ESW), the Science Festival faces the theme of Exploration: from the new frontiers reached in the most various fields of research to the progressive tendency in many sciences to leave their specific boundaries and to compare themselves with other fields.
With the participation of :

- John Barrow
- Marc Augé
- Semir Zeki
- Jean-Pierre Changeux
- Carl Djerassi
- Felice Frankel
- Umberto Veronesi
- Pep Bou
- Alessandro Bergonzoni
- Enrico Alleva
- Stefano Benni
- Giovanni Soldini
- Folco Quilici
- Peter Atkins
- Enrico Bellone

=== 2005: "Frontiers" ===
The third edition of the Science Festival, from 27 October to 8 November 2005, is dedicated to the key theme of Frontiers, in the sense of the meeting points between the known and the unknown, of the limits which must continuously be moved back, of boundaries and thresholds of different forms of knowledge, to be constantly overcome by new forms of interdisciplinary research.
With the participation of :

- Benoit Mandelbrot
- Martin Rees
- Craig Venter
- John Brockman
- Peter Greenaway
- Roger Penrose
- Robert Laughilin
- Richard Ellis
- Richard Wiseman
- Brian Fagan
- Marcello Cini
- Neil Gershenfeld
- Angelo Raffaele Meo
- John Stachel
- Owen Gingerich
- Richard Fortey

=== 2006: "Discovery" ===
In its fourth edition, from 26 October to 7 November 2006, the Science Festival faces the key theme of Discovery and gains a further international ennoblement with UNESCO's decision to celebrate the World Day of Science for Peace a Development in Genoa on 7 November, the final day of the event, organised with IPSO (Israeli-Palestinian Science Organization).
With the participation of :

- Theodor Haensch
- Daniel Kahneman
- Torsten Wiesel
- Fritjof Capra
- Edouard Brézin
- Artur Ekert
- Lisa Randall
- Robert Trivers
- Umberto Eco
- Piergiorgio Odifreddi
- Michio Kaku
- Sean B. Carrol
- Giorgio Vallortigara
- Anne Treisman
- Terrence Deacon

=== 2007: "Curiosity" ===
The fifth edition of the Science Festival, held from 25 October to 6 November 2007, dealt with the theme of Curiosity, consolidated the popularity of the event and enhanced its international scope. After having been short-listed as one of the 10 Best Practices in Scientific Popularisation by the European Union Commission, the presentation press conference held at CERN in Geneva was a further confirmation of the international scope of the event. A record-breaking edition, in terms of both quality and quantity with over 250 thousand visitors.
With the participation of :

- Frans Lanting
- Enrico Rava
- Furio di Castri
- Jon Balke
- Patrice Heral
- Freeman Dyson
- Jane Goodall
- Marc Hauser
- Jean-Marc Lévy-Leblond
- Michel Morange
- Jack Steinberger
- Marc Abrahams
- Reinhold Messner
- Hilary Putnam

=== 2008: "Diversity" ===
The sixth edition held from 23 October to 4 November 2008, chooses the common thread of Diversity and for the first time divides the over 350 events on the programme in six different theme areas which represents a virtual interdisciplinary "narrative" route depending on which point of view the main concept is to be analyzed. With the participation of :

- David Gross
- Devra Devis
- Jean-Didier Vincent
- Catherine Vidal
- Nigel Tapper
- Gabrielle Walker
- Kenneth Timmis
- James Geary
- Catia Bastioli
- Giovanna Tinetti
- Fabrizio Lillo
- Elena Cattaneo
- Massimo Livi Bacci
- Norman Doidge
- Paul Steinhardt
- Johan Lehrer
- Jean-Didier Vincent
- Paolo Giordano

=== 2009: "Future" ===
The 2009 edition is dedicated to the Future,
a topic which science can help us to decode by offering interpretations of that are important to our understanding of what tomorrow will be like. With the participation of :

- Luc Montagnier
- Dario Fo
- Lee Smolin
- Jean-Pierre Luminet
- Thomas Lucas
- Sören Hermansen
- Antonio Iavarone
- John Cacioppo
- Stanislas Dehaene
- Sandra Savaglio
- Piero Angela
- Sebastian Seung
- Richard Wiseman
- Micheal Gazzaniga
- Richard Muller
- Stefano Bollani
- Stephon Alexander
- Jason Mitchell

From 4 to 13 December, a few of the best of the format is led to Palermo for the first Sicily edition of the Festival.

== International Partnerships ==
- Masad – Mediterranean Association for Science Advancement and Dissemination
- Euscea – European Science Events Association
- Ecsite – European Network of Science Centres and Museums
- Marseille Provence 2013 – European Capital of Culture 2013
- SAST – Shanghai Association for Science and Technology
