= Leonhard Lapin =

Estonian architect and artist (1947–2022)

Epp Haabsaar
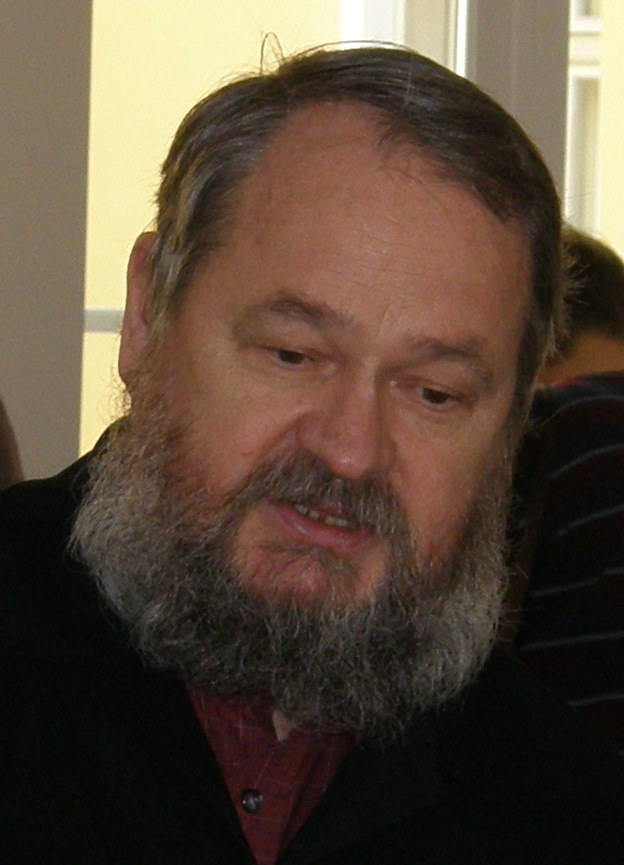
- Born: 29 December 1947; Räpina, then part of Estonian SSR, Soviet Union
- Died: 28 February 2022 (aged 74)
- Education: Estonian Academy of Arts

Leonhard Lapin (29 December 1947 – 28 February 2022), also known under the pseudonym Albert Trapeež, was an Estonian architect, artist, architecture historian, and poet.

== Biography ==
A professor emeritus at Estonian Academy of Arts, Lapin was a forerunner of the avant-garde movement in Estonia, and he influenced Estonian art and architecture through his works and writings during the postwar 20th century. Lapin was active in functionalism, suprematism, technological futurism, and pop art. As an artist, he created graphics, paintings, performances, and happenings, and he published several articles, books, and poetry collections. Lapin influenced many students as a teacher; he regarded architecture and art mainly as a spiritual activity. He died on 28 February 2022, at the age of 74. After his death, he was cremated and his ashes were scattered over the river in Pirita.

== Biography ==
- 1965: graduated from Räpina High School
- 1966–1971: studied architecture at the ERKI
- 1970: was introduced to Academic Oriental Association, where he learned about Buddhism
- 1971–1974: worked at Tallinn's Restoration Government as an architect under the Estonian art researcher Helmi Üprus and discovered Estonia's architectural heritage of 20th century
- 1977: member of the Estonian Artists Association
- 1982: member of the Estonian Association of Architects
- 1990: lecturer at the Estonian Academy of Arts
- 1995: professor at the Estonian Academy of Arts
- 1991–2003: head editor of the Estonian Association of Architects' publication Ehituskunst
- 1992–1998: lecturer at Helsinki's Maa Art School
- 1992: member of the Nordic–Baltic architectural triennial committee
- 1993–1996: member of the Maa Art School governing body
- 1994: guest professor at the Architecture Department at the Helsinki Institute of Technology
- 1995–1997 and 2003–2005: chairman of visual and applied arts foundation capital at the Cultural Endowment of Estonia
- 1997–2000: chairman of the committee "Space and Form 2000"
- 1997, 2002, and 2005: guest professor at the Estonian Music Academy
- 1998–2001: director of the Tallinn Art Council
- 2001–2002: professor of the Visual Arts Department at the University of Tartu
- 2012: emeritus professor at the Estonian Academy of Arts

== Personal life ==
Born in Räpina, Lapin is Sofia Lapin's (Sõrmus) and Rudolf Mõttus's son. More relatives: half-brother, Doctor of Philosophy Voldemar Lapin, half-brother Anatoli Mettus and half-sister Valentina Olli (Lapin). On the father's side of the family, men worked as tailors. Mother worked as the director of a sewing manufacturer. That is why Lapin was thinking to study fashion at the Estonian Academy of Arts, but his eldest brother told him to study architecture. The family name Lapin comes from the mother's first husband Rūdolfs Lapiņš, an ethnic Latvian. After Russification the surname was changed into Lapin.

Lapin became close to Oriental Association and Buddhist mahamudra teachings, which became the base for his future composition teaching method. 1969–1982 he was married to Sirje Runge. Later he married the architect Kristel Jaanus. In 1991 their daughter Anna Maria was born and in 1996 son Aleksander.

== Creativity ==
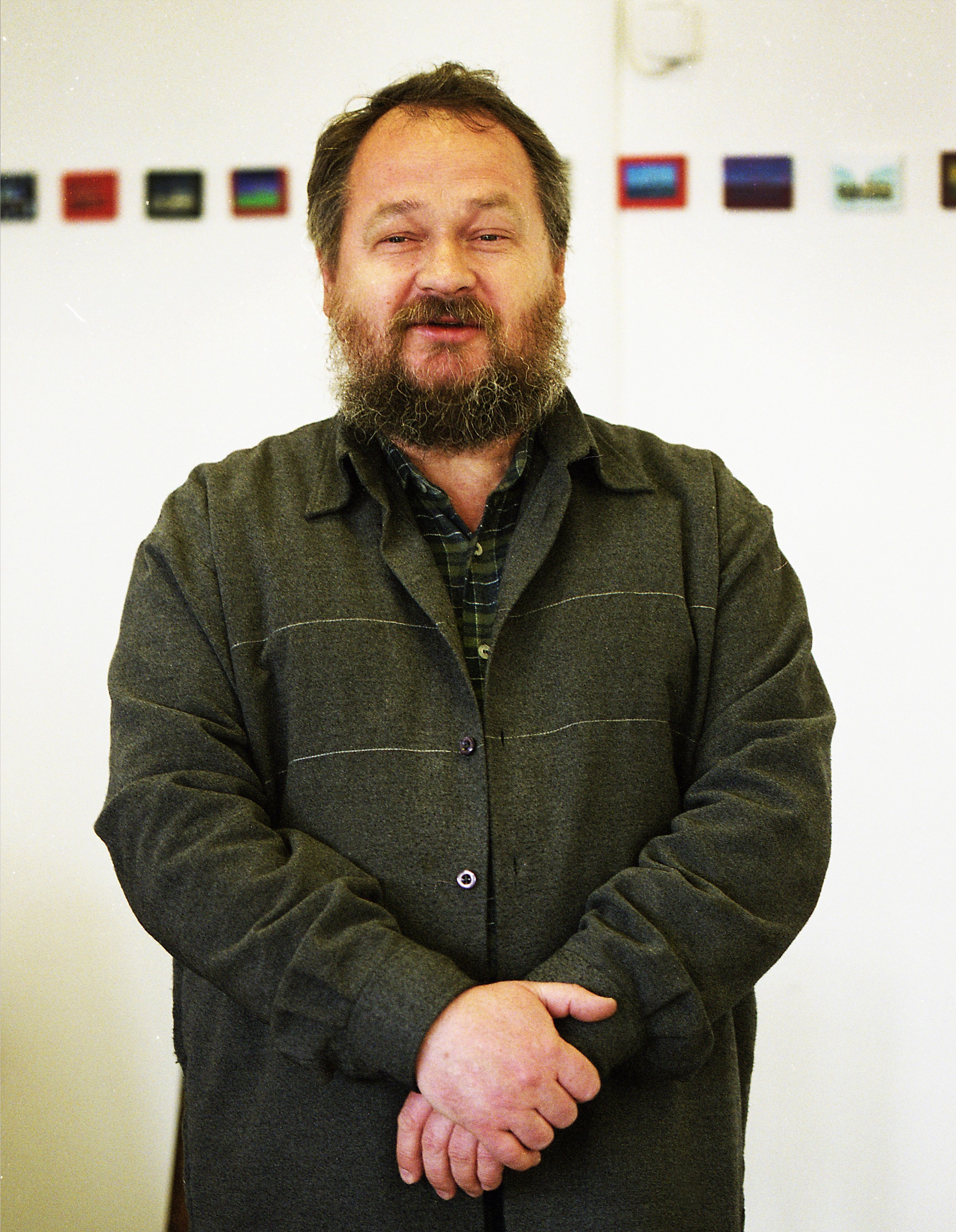
Lapin in 2001

=== Art and literature ===
Leonhard Lapin began active work during 1960 and raised rapidly to leading avant-garde artist position, but also organizer and theorist. He was a member of avant-garde artists movement SOUP´69. His graphics brought him international attention, especially series where he addressed blending of human being and a machine. As an artist he has created ink drawings, graphics in silk screen printing, gravure printing and lithography techniques, paintings in watercolor, gouache and oil, architectons, sculptures and installations. He also did artworks in pop art in the late 1960s, influenced by Andy Warhol. He wrote articles and poetry that criticized Soviet art ideologies, that were spread as manuscripts. Later the poems have been published as collections under pseudonym Albert Trapeež. Lapin made his first architecton in 1976 and it was named "Monument to Tallinn". It was Lapin who brought the word "architecton" to Estonian and Finnish languages. The notion comes from 20th century Russian avant-garde artist Kazimir Malevich, for whom "architecton" meant the home of future human being. Lapin also created a notion of "own space" ("omaruum" in Estonian) that he dealt with in his composition teachings. Lapin has conducted first happenings in Estonia, also has staged performances in theatre. He has been invited to very many exhibitions in other countries, his works are in national and private collections all over the world. Lapin's concept of space and void has been source of expression of his ideas. He has written many books on this topic. Leo has an individual emotional writing style, too subjective for academic writing, which does not mean that his texts have no historiographic value.

=== Architecture ===
Lapin belonged to the generation of "young angry architects" together with other young architects who graduated from Estonian Academy of Arts during the 1970s. At that time L. Lapin was a persona non grata among architects but in the arts sphere he was recognized as an enfant terrible. Other group members were Vilen Künnapu, Tiit Kaljundi, Avo-Himm Looveer, Ain Padrik, Jüri Okas, Jaan Ollik and Ignar Fjuk, joined by slightly older architects Veljo Kaasik and Toomas Rein. They called themselves "The Tallinn Ten" but they can be put under wider term "Tallinn School" because it covered wider circles of architects, artists, designers and engineers of that generation. During the Soviet time acting as a group was more effective because they could accomplish more than while standing alone. The main message of the group was that architecture is a form of art. The greater goal was to change architecture, environment, people's attitude towards them and to give sense to contemporary society and culture. "Tallinn School" was of experimental architects and artists, but mostly Leonhard Lapin dealt with the history of architecture, mainly by writing but also in other art forms. During his education, as a future architect he got acquainted with the functionalism of the 1930s, that had strong disapproval from the Soviet regime. But Lapin also ardoured early Russian avant-garde art and Russian constructivism, so he could not be accused of treason by the government. The new term neofunctualism grew out of Lapin's plastic architecture with machine aesthetic. Tallinn School's architects could express themselves mainly through private house projects since other types of constructions were strictly regulated. Although in the course of creating an outstanding and individual exterior, the suitability of the surroundings and the comfortable usage of the interior spaces were often neglected. During the 1976–77 Lapin developed his houses according to his graphics series "Machines". A good example is Villa Valeri I, located in Laagri, Estonia, that is an equivalent of his work "Machine-architecture III or Villa Valeri I" (1976). The paradox of Lapin is that although he executed contemporary avant-garde, in his writings he dealt with historical styles and notions. Through creation of a linkage between earlier history of architecture and art and also by dealing with terminological problems Leonhard wanted to raise the awareness in the Estonian society.

"In 1978 we presented 'pure ideas', as our aim was to show architecture as an independent form of art, a manifestation of the spiritual, but also as an independent and influential feature that played a part in social processes."

== Works ==
=== Art ===
- (1970) "Becoming One With the Star" series
- (1972) "Machines" series
- (1975) "Cosmic Machine" oil painting
- (1977–95) "Machine-Houses" graphic series of villas
- (1982) "Self-Portrait as Venus" photo
- (1987) "Monument to Tallinn" architecton
- (2003) "Codes" painting series

=== Architecture ===
- (1970) "Ugala" Viljandi Theatre project
- (1973) "Tallinn Sailing Center" competition project with A.-H.Looveer and others, I prize
- (1979) "Artificial Landscape" in Viimsi
- (1988) "Haljala Chapel" competition project, I prize
- (1992) "Tallinn Town Hall" ideekavand, I prize
- (1992) "Aglona (Latvia) Catholic Center" design solution, with V.Strams
- (1993) "Freedom Square" competition project, with K.Jaanus, II prize
- (1994) "Gdansk Citycentre" design solution, with K.Jaanus
- (1994) "Estonian Forest" installation concept for São Paulo biennial
- (1995) "MOnument for Second World War Victims on Tõnismägi (Tallinn)" competition project, I prize
- (2003) "Blue-Black-White Clock-Monument" monument of Freedom Clock

== Awards and acknowledgments ==
- (1973) Award of Ljubljana Print Triennal
- (1974) Award of Tokyo Print Triennal
- (1987) Annual Paintings award of Estonian Artists Association
- (1987) Award of USSR Architecture
- (1989) Art award of Kristjan Raud for nimeline kunsti award for the treatment of mythological topic
- (1997) Cultural award of Republic of Estonia
- (2001) The Order of the White Star IV class order
- (2001) Annual award of Estonian Association of Interior Architects
- (2003) "25 Best Designed Books of Estonia" award, for designing Okakura Kakuzo book "Book of Tea"
- (2003) Cultural Endowment Literature Endowment essay award nominant for "Tühjus. Void" and "Avangard" books
- (2004) Annual award of Association of Estonian Printmakers for creative work of 2003
- (2004) Mini-Print International Timișoara, Romania. I prize nominee
- Annual Estonian Association of Interior Architects publicist studies award for "XX Century Estonian Space" ("Eesti XX sajandi ruum") book compilation
- (2007) Tallinn XIV International Print Triennal: Tallinn City award
- Annual Paintings award of Estonian Artists Association
