= Tiit Kaljundi =

Estonian architect (1946–2008)

Tiit Kaljundi (4 April 1946 – 1 February 2008) was an Estonian architect and a member of the Tallinn School. He became well known in the later part of the 1970s as a part of a new movement of Estonian architects that was led by Leonhard Lapin and Vilen Künnapu. The majority of the architects in this movement were graduates from the State Art Institute in the early 1970s. This group included Kaljundi, Avo-Himm Looveer, Ain Padrik, Jüri Okas, and Ignar Fjuk, as well as Veljo Kaasik and Toomas Rein from an older generation of architects. After the 1983 exhibition in the Tallinn Art Salon, they became known as the “Tallinn Ten" or the "Tallinn School," a broader term to describe the group used by the Finnish architect Markku Komonen.

== Early life ==
He was born in Paide and later and graduated first in his class from Viljandi High School in 1964 and then studied at the Polytechnic Institute in the Faculty of Economics. He attended the Estonian Academy of Arts starting in 1965 and graduated in 1970.

== Architectural career ==
Early in his career, Kaljundi was an architectural assistant at the Estonian Academy of Arts. He worked at the Estonian Land Development Project for five years starting in 1970, and following that he worked at the Tentrosojuz Project.

In the early 1980s, Kaljundi promoted small town development and was against the Soviet urban development policies of the time. Kajlundi responded to the new mass apartment blocks being constructed by advocating for a polar opposite solution: the post-modernist villa. During this time period, he also worked on landscaping, working on projects including the Rakvere castle hills, Tartu Toomemägi and the Sinimäe memorial. Kajlundi also created other plans for urban development that were later implemented, including the consolidation of the Kuressaare city center and reconstruction of its cultural library.

In 1988 he joined the Union of Estonian Architects and in 1997 he established his own office. During this part of his career, his style gradually shifted away from his style of functionalism and moved towards constructivism and conceptualism, which he used to create his own home in Merivälja towards the end of his career.

== List of works ==
- Telephone exchange-residential in Kanepi (1973)
- Garden city center in Muuga (1973)
- Dr Spock's residence (1975)
- School building in Muraste (1978)
- Apartment house at Pärnu mnt. 18 (1978) - unbuilt
- Extension of St. John's Church in Haapsalu (1987)
- Reconstruction of ETKVL Tallinn Commercial Inventory Factory (1982)
- Shop-canteen in Surju (1986)
- Department store in Valga (1987)
- Store in Kihnu (1987)
- A detailed plan of the land register and the surrounding area of Vallimäe tee 5 (2007)
- Maisi 37, architect's district in Tartu (1983)
- Viljandi lossivaremete maastike arendamisprojekt (1985)
- Agricultural Combine Buildings in Põltsamaa (1987-1992)
- Sports building plan of ETKVL(1992)
- Reconstruction of the Pärnu mnt. 160 factory building in Tallinn (1993)
- A detailed plan of the cemetery area in Rohuneeme (1997)
- Tartu Toomemägi (2003)
- Memorial of Sinimägede (2000)
- Reconstruction project of cultural center-library, with Andres Põime (2002)
- The new brother's cemetery in Vistla, with sculptor Ekke Väli (2008)

== Exhibitions ==
- Art Gallery of Tallinn (1982-1983)
- Helsinki, Museum of Finnish Architecture, 9 architects from Tallinn (1984-1985)
- Jyväskylä, Museum of Alvar Aalto, 9 architects from Tallinn (1984-1985)
- Rovaniemi, 9 architects from Tallinn (1984-1985)
- Götebeorg, applied art museum (1988)
- Zürich, 10 architects from Tallinn (1989)
- Stockholm, Museum of Sweden Architecture, 10 architects from Tallinn (1990)
- Väike 2002-2006 (2006)

== Awards ==
"Väike 2002-2006" contest, I-II place - Staircase in Saka

Yachting Centre at Pirita, I place - unbuilt
