= AHHAA =

Science centre in Tartu, Estonia

Coordinates: 58.376694°N 26.734098°E

- Science Centre AHHAA
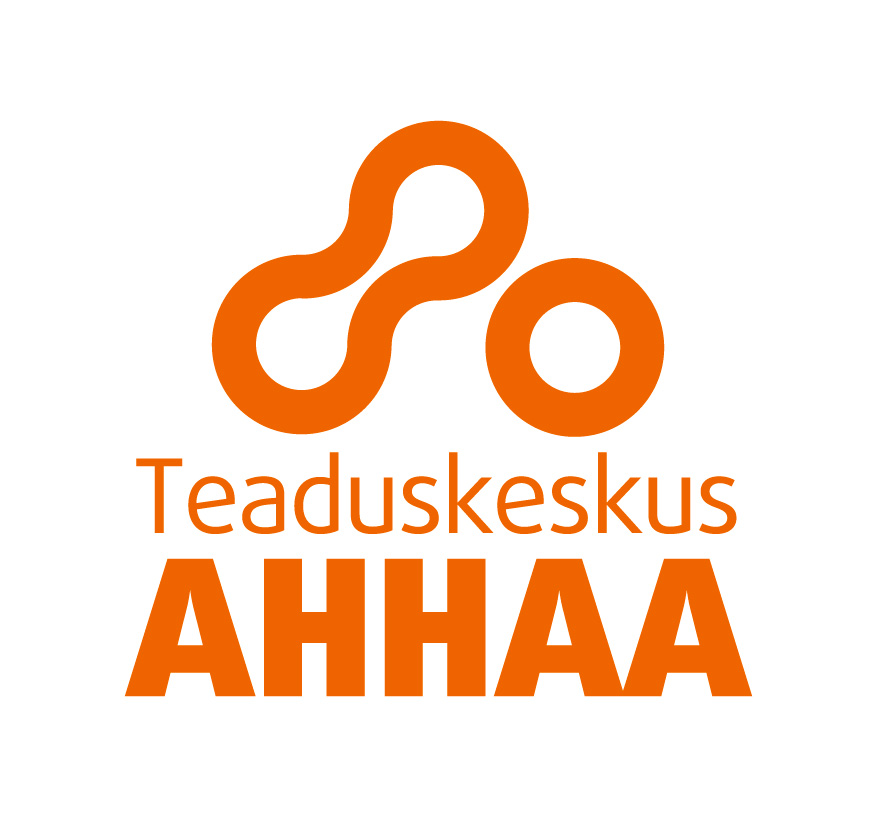

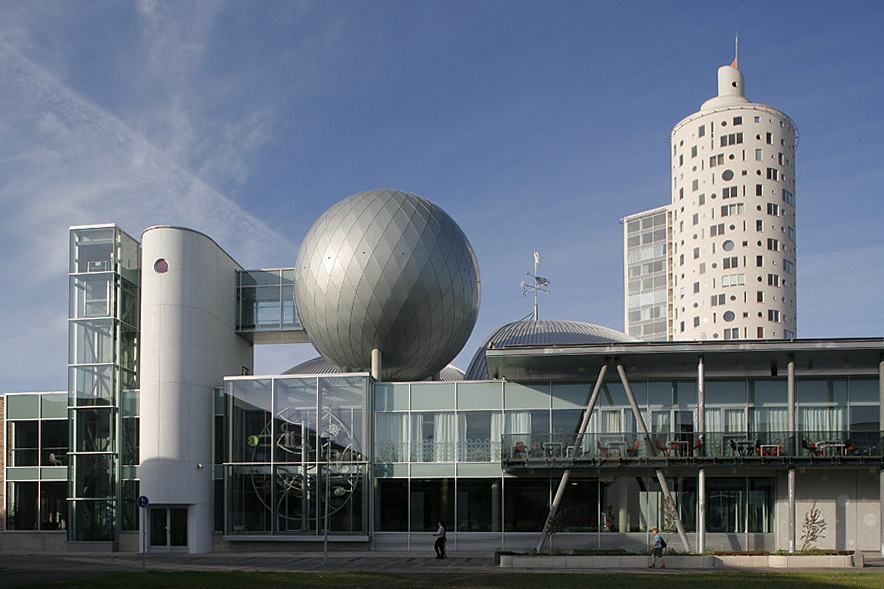
- Science Centre AHHAA
- Established: 1 September 1997
- Location: Tartu
- Type: Science museum
- Founders: City of Tartu and the University of Tartu
- Website: Official website

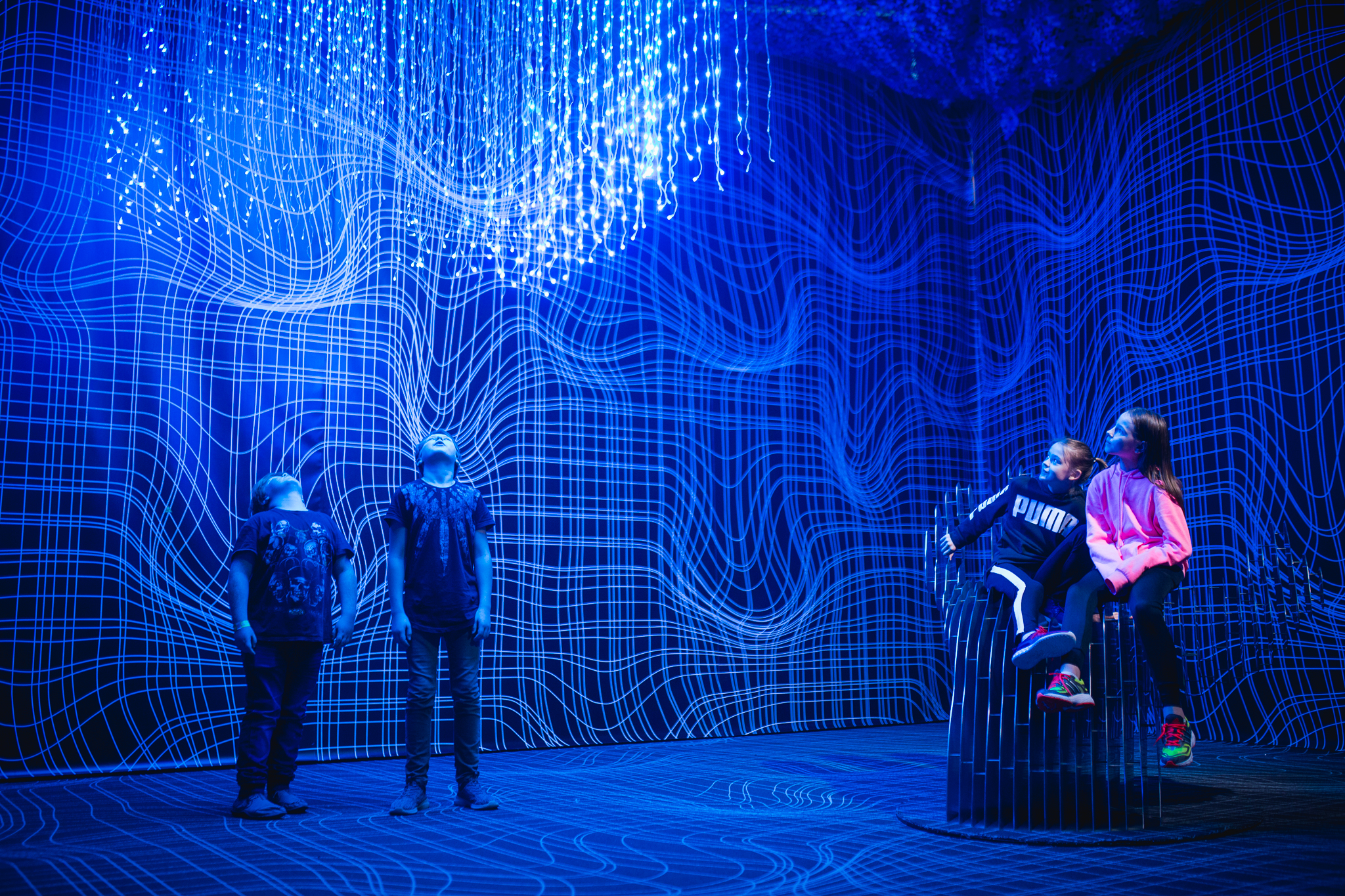
Exposition of illusions in AHHAA

Science Centre AHHAA (Estonian: Teaduskeskus AHHAA) is a science centre located in Tartu, Estonia, and is currently the largest science centre in the Baltic states. AHHAA was established to promote science and technology using interactive exhibits.

Since 7 May 2011, Science Centre AHHAA has been in the building located in the centre of Tartu.

== History ==
AHHAA was established as a project of the University of Tartu on 1 September 1997. Since 12.03.2004, it has operated as a foundation constituted by the city of Tartu and the University of Tartu. The activities of the Science Centre AHHAA Foundation are coordinated by a committee composed of Katrin Pihor, Hannes Astok, Aune Valk, Reno Laidre, Jaanika Anderson and Sulev Valner. Additionally, the practical aspects of the activities of the foundation are appraised by a science committee composed of experts consisting of Jaan Kikas, Peeter Saari, Jaak Jaaniste, Mart Noorma, Arko Olesk, Toivo Maimets, Priit Põdra and Margit Timakov. AHHAA is governed by the board consisting of two members. Tiiu Sild was the head of the board until 2012. She was followed by Andres Juur (head of board since 2012). The second board member is Pilvi Kolk (member of board since 2005).

In 2008, the AHHAA 4D Adventure Cinema opened in the Lõunakeskus shopping centre located in Tartu (the cinema was closed at the end of 2017). In 2009, a branch office of Science Centre AHHAA opened in Tallinn at the Freedom Square (the Tallinn branch was closed at the end of 2013). On 7 May 2011, Science Centre AHHAA in Tartu opened the doors of its new, 11,156 m^{2} building engineered by architects Vilen Künnapu and Ain Padrik.

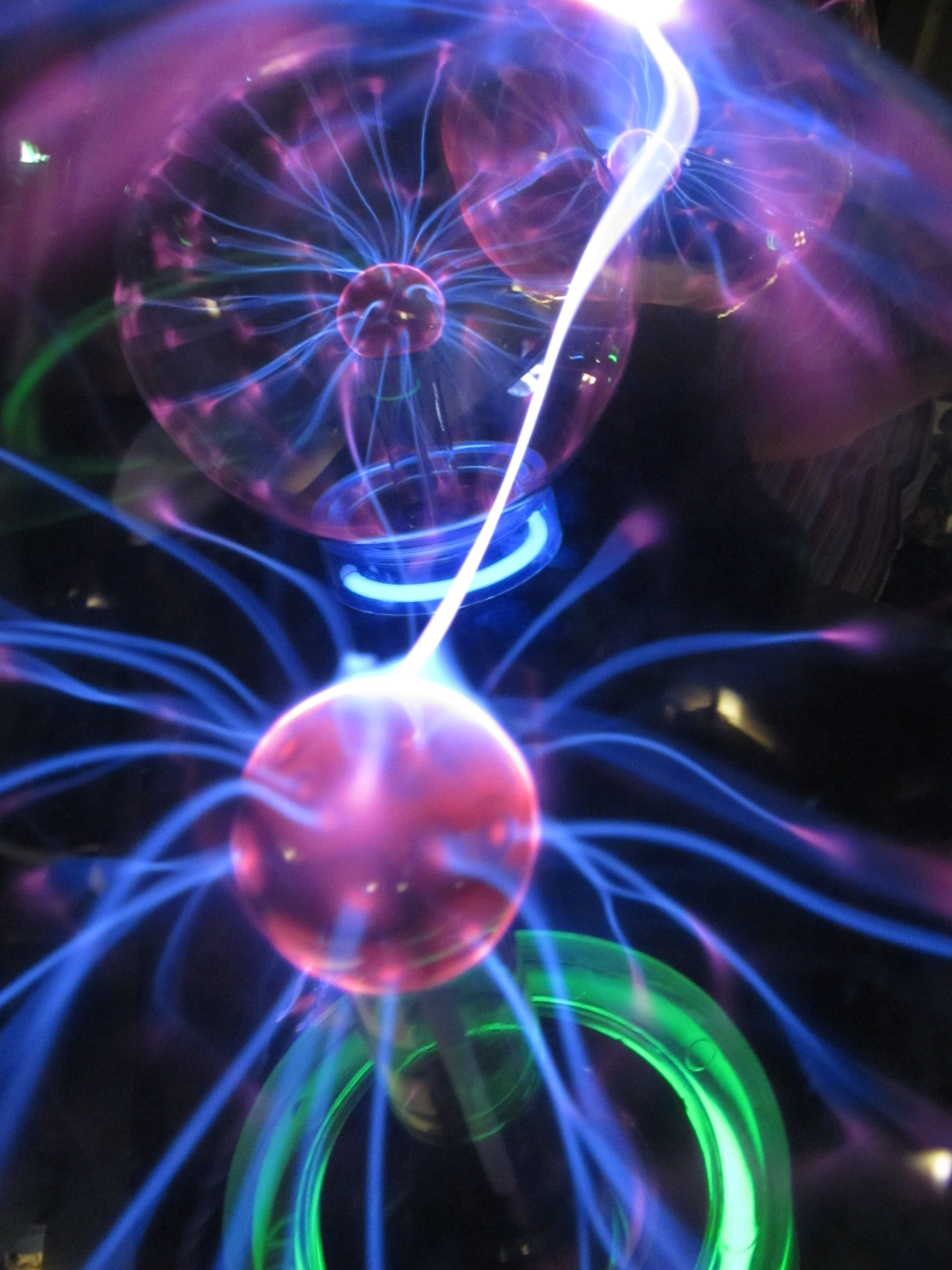
A plasma globe

== Planetarium ==
Science Centre AHHAA houses a fully spherical hybrid planetarium (which means there is a possibility to show the skies with optical and digital projection, which can be displayed separately or together).

The planetarium design includes a glass floor which allows the projection images to extend under the floor.

=== General ===
- The planetarium is 9 meters in diameter
- It contains 20+5 seats
- It is the first planetarium in Europe to use the MEGASTAR projector
- It is also the first hybrid-planetarium (multiple projector system) in the Baltic states

The AHHAA Planetarium belongs to two organisations:

- The Nordic Planetarium Association
- The International Planetarium Society

== 4D Adventure Cinema ==
Science Centre AHHAA had a 4D Adventure Cinema, located in the Lõunakeskus shopping centre on the southern edge of Tartu. The cinema was open from 18 July 2008 to 31 December 2017.

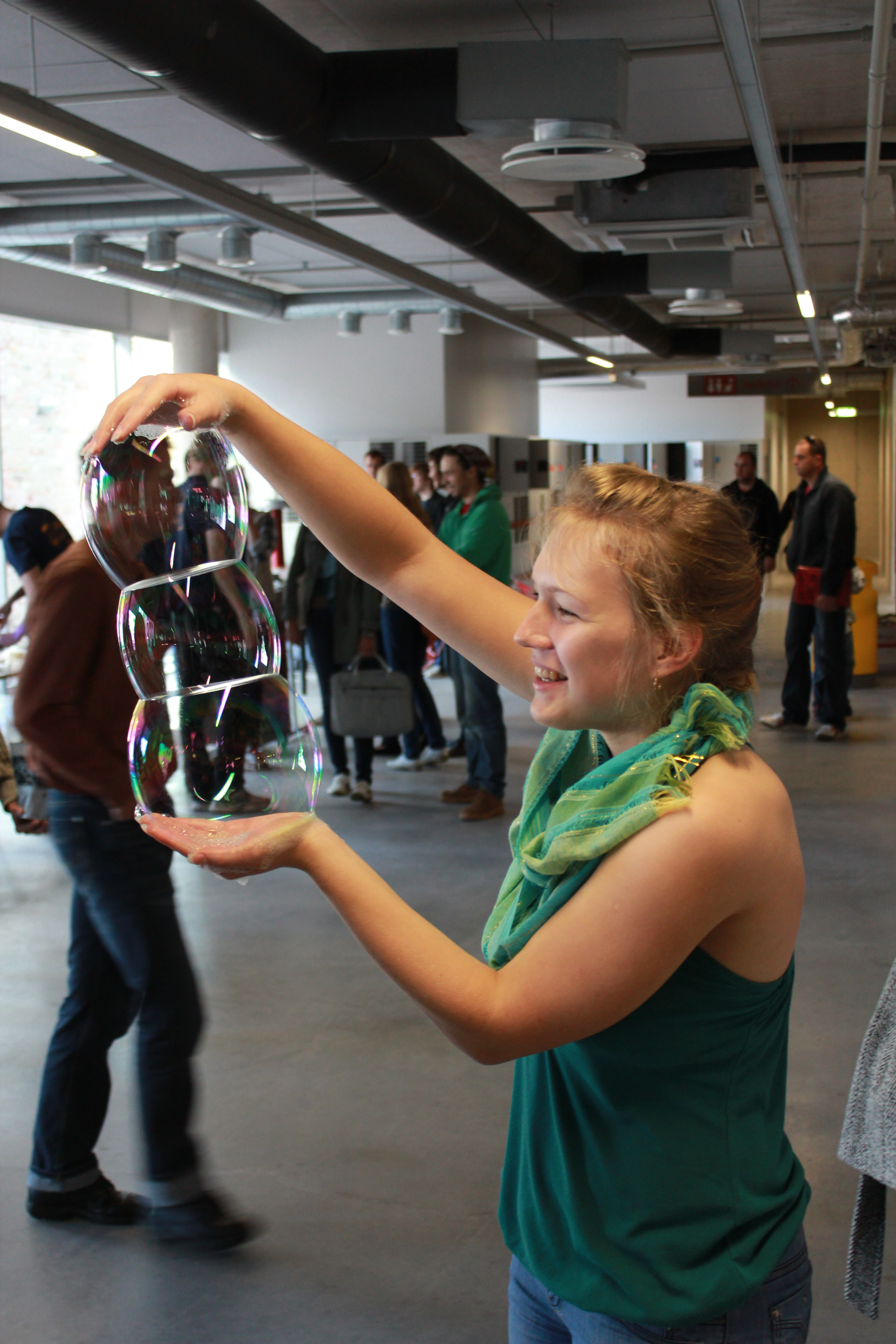
"Bubble Tower"

== Events ==
The Science Centre AHHAA Foundation regularly organizes special events. Some of the most notable events are listed below:

- The annual Researchers' Night Festival – organized all over Estonia in the end of September and consisting of different events promoting a scientific approach to matters (such as Science Cafés, science theatre shows, tours in laboratories, workshops etc.).

== International representation ==
The Science Centre AHHAA Foundation participates in science festivals and fairs both in Estonia and abroad, its main choice being the science theatre shows and various workshops. Among the places where Science Centre AHHAA has been represented are the Festival della Scienza and Perugia Science Fest in Italy, Korea Science Festival in South Korea, Moscow Science Festival in Russia, Science Picnic in Poland and Science Festival Belgrade in Serbia.

== Acknowledgements ==
Science Centre AHHAA has been awarded with numerous prizes both for the building as well as for its intellectual achievements.

- At the TourEst2012 fair held on February 17–19, 2012 Science Centre AHHAA in Tartu was chosen to be the best tourism destination in 2011 by the Union of Estonian Enterprises of Tourism.
- On February 16, 2012, the Tartu City Council posthumously awarded Tiiu Sild, Creator and leader of AHHAA, with the title of the Honorary Citizen of Tartu.
- On December 19, 2011, Tiiu Sild, the head of Science Centre AHHAA received an award of courtesy for the year 2011, given out by a family magazine “Pere ja Kodu”.
- On December 7, 2011, Science Centre AHHAA in Tartu was awarded with the title “The Best Tourism Destination in 2011” by the Foundation South Estonian Tourism.
- On November 28, 2011, Science Centre AHHAA in Tartu won the competition of the Achievement of the Year.
- On November 11, 2011, during the scientific media conference called “MIDA?!” the head of Science Centre AHHAA, Tiiu Sild, was announced to have been awarded the lifetime achievement award for popularising science.
- Between November 2 and 5, 2011 at the IFD Congress held in Dublin, Ireland, the roof of Science Centre AHHAA constructed by Nordecon, presided over by Peeter Voovere, was announced the World's Best-Built Roof in 2010–2011 in the category of metal roofs.
- On October 7, 2011, the footprints of Tiiu Sild, the head of the Science Centre AHHAA, were permanently paved into the alley of famous and influential citizens of Tartu.
- On March 4, 2011, Science Centre AHHAA won the title of “The Best Building in Tartu 2010” in the category of other new buildings.

== Donors and sponsors ==
The activities of the Science Centre AHHAA Foundation are in co-operation with:

- The Estonian Ministry of Education and Research
- The City of Tartu, the University of Tartu
- Linde
- The Environmental Investment Centre
- The Rakvere Meat Factory
- A.Le Coq Tartu Brewery

== See also ==
- List of science centers#Europe
