= Éléonore Laloux =

French politician and activist

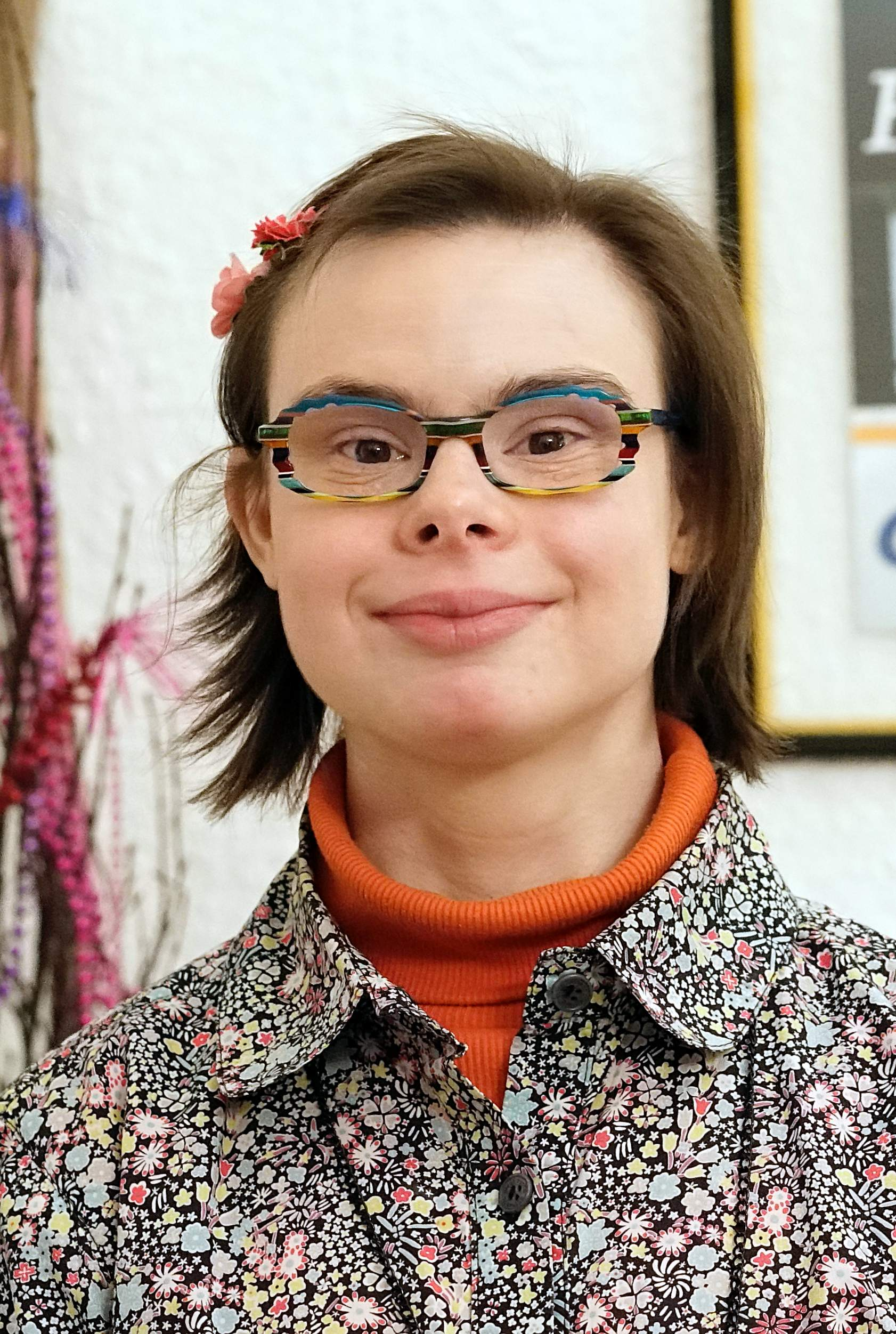
- Éléonore Laloux in 2020

Municipal Councillor of Arras

Personal details
- Profession: Activist

Éléonore Laloux is a French disability rights activist, writer, and politician with Down syndrome. As a spokesperson for the collective Les Amis d'Éléonore, she has defended the causes of people with Down syndrome and has confronted stigmatization surrounding the condition following comments by people in politics and the media. She is the author of Triso et alors!, which was published in 2014.

== Biography ==
In March 2013, she appeared on an episode of Le Grand Journal on Canal+ alongside Valérie Trierweiler.

On March 21, 2014 (World Down Syndrome Day), her biography Triso et alors! (English: Down syndrome, and so what?). A Spanish translation was published in 2015, titled Tengo Síndrome de Down ... ¿y qué?.

On November 29, 2017, Laloux argued for the rights of people of disabilities on the television show Un monde en docs on the channel Public Sénat. Public Sénat ranked Éléonore's appearance in the top five for that year.

In April 2023, Mattel chose Éléonore Laloux as an ambassador for their first doll with Down syndrome.

On March 20, 2025, Laloux was invited to speak at the United Nations in Geneva at the 32nd session of the Committee on the Rights of Persons with Disabilities.

In October 2021, she became a recipient of the Ordre national du Mérite.

== Political career ==
In March 2020, Éléonore Laloux was elected as a municipal councilor of Arras under mayor Frédéric Leturque.

On July 1, 2023, Laloux became the first elected official with Down syndrome to get married.

In March 2026, she was re-elected to the council.

== Controversy ==
Following comments made by neurobiologist Jean-Didier Vincent on the program La Tête au carréon France Inter on October 5, 2012, where he claimed, "Why do we conserve Down syndrome when it is a poison in the family?", Éléonore Laloux responded multiple times, including in a 2013 video and in Triso et alors!. She has also denounced derogatory claims made by doctors.

In 2026, she was targeted by discriminatory comments on X, which were condemned by Frédéric Leturque and resulted in complaints against X.

== Les Amis d'Éléonore ==
Created in March 2010 by a group of families with people with Down syndrome, including Laloux and her father Emmanuel, Les Amis d'Éléonore (English: Friends of Éléonore) was formed with the goal of confronting societal discrimination against people with Down syndrome, and financing therapeutic research into Down syndrome. By May 2010, the collective comprised fifteen families with children with Down syndrome.

=== Positions ===
In 2010, Les Amis d'Éléonore participated in debates regarding the inclusion of routine testing for Down syndrome in preimplantation genetic diagnosis in France. They noted they did oppose access to abortion, claiming themselves to be secular and pro-choice, but wanted to inform the public about the risks of seeking to create a "perfect child". The collective noted the adoption of bioethics laws, and called for objective information to be available to expecting mothers.

In March 2014, the collective participated in the campaign Dear Future Mom (Chère Future Maman).

== Bibliography ==
- Éléonore Laloux with Yann Barte, Triso et alors!, Max Milo Éditions, 2014.
- Tengo Síndrome de Down ... ¿y qué?, Spanish translation of Triso et alors! by Alfonso Díez with afterword by Enric Berenguer, 2015.

== See also ==
- List of people with Down syndrome
