= Dear Future Mom =

2014 French television campaign

Dear Future Mom (originally in French: Chère Future Maman) is a television campaign created by 15 European associations active in the field of Down syndrome, advocating for an inclusive and welcoming society for people with this condition through a message that is intended to be anti-eugenics.

The campaign was widely broadcast on 21 March 2014, during the World Down Syndrome Day, across all of Europe.

This campaign led to controversy in France, where the broadcast of the clip was suspended by the French Conseil supérieur de l'audiovisuel due to its impact on mothers who had opted for a medical termination of pregnancy (MTP).

== Creation and context ==
The Dear Future Mom campaign was initially created by 15 European associations in the field of Down syndrome, including in France, Les Amis d’Éléonore, which is secular and pro-choice, and the Fondation Jérôme-Lejeune, which is controversial for its anti-abortion stance. The Italian association CoorDown, which advocates for the integration of people with Down syndrome into society, supervised the production of the clip.

The campaign, lasting 2 minutes and 30 seconds, was broadcast on the occasion of World Down Syndrome Day on 21 March 2014. It features young people with Down syndrome (of European origin, including some French) expressing their happiness in life, and was described as simple and touching on the LCI website. The clip is addressed, as its title suggests, to a mother expecting a child diagnosed with Down syndrome. The people with Down syndrome explain:

"Dear Future Mom, don't be afraid. Your son will be able to do many things. He will be able to hug you, run towards you, speak and tell you that he loves you."

The message of this clip aims to comfort all future parents and raise awareness about prenatal screening, as 96% of fetuses diagnosed with Down syndrome are aborted in France.

== Broadcast ==
In France, a 30-second excerpt from this campaign was broadcast on television channels such as TF1, M6, Direct 8, and Canal+, between March and April 2014. On YouTube, the French version of the video garnered more than 4.5 million views in six days, eventually reaching over 7 million views, according to the French newspaper Le Monde.

== Legal aspect ==
In June 2014, the French Conseil supérieur de l'audiovisuel (CSA) requested the suspension of the broadcast of the campaign excerpt by French channels, arguing that it is unlikely to elicit spontaneous support, and that its message is not of public interest as it is likely to disturb women who have undergone a Medical termination of pregnancy.

The CSA claimed to have received complaints regarding the message conveyed by the clip, which motivated its negative opinion on the broadcast. In December 2014, the president of the Superior Council of Audiovisual provided an anonymized copy of these complaints.

Seven young adults with Down syndrome appealed to the Council of State to contest the censorship by the CSA, citing their freedom of expression. A hearing was granted to them on 7 September 2016, without the presence of a lawyer, in what the newspaper Le Monde described as an unprecedented move. Later on, the Council of State published its decision to reject the appeals of the Down syndrome associations. In its decision, it ruled that the portrayal of a positive view of the personal and social life of young people with Down syndrome serves a public interest, but also that the CSA did not make any legal or factual error in classifying the broadcast of the campaign as inappropriate.

The European Court of Human Rights (ECHR), seized by several associations, declared their application inadmissible in 2022.
