= Ain Padrik =

Estonian architect

Ain Padrik (born 27 April 1947) is an Estonian architect.

Padrik graduated from Estonian Academy of Arts as an architect in 1971. He belonged to the group of young architects and artists called the Tallinn School, which was grouped from Tiit Kaljundi, Vilen Künnapu, Leonhard Lapin, Avo-Himm Looveer and Ülevi Eljand. During the Soviet period he worked at EKE Projekt. In 1991 Padrik and Vilen Künnapu formed the company Künnapu & Padrik. Padrik has been a teacher at Tallinn University of Technology. He is part of the Union of Estonian Architects.

== Creation ==
One of his works is the Raikküla Kolkhoz building (1981). The postmodernist building is masterfully bounded with a mansion ensemble close by. Throughout the building there are details of classical architecture - pillars, pilasters and frontons. At the same time the building follows the sample house architecture.

In the same year, Padrik and Künnapu took part in the Tallinn 2. Secondary School competition. A postmodern building with the masculine Atlantis holding the rooftop angle, brought them a first place. In the 1990s, however, it was found that the building was using too much resources and the idea of a glass elevator on the facade did not find support from the heritage protection, due which the building was not built.

Similar fate was with the Lembitu house of fashion architecture competition in Tallinn, 1979 that was also unbuilt.

In 1982 they looked outside of Estonia and took part of their first international competition Parc de la Villette Competition in Paris.

The first international recognition came to Padrik and Künnapu in collaboration with Lennart Meri with the Architectural Competition of the Arctic Center in 1984 in Finland, winning them the special prize. The main volume of the building was penetrated by the slanting glass tower directed towards the Stella Polaris. The mythological concept with Lappish ornamentation was formed into a contemporary and simple image. The building received a lot of foreign attention. It was published in the Finnish Architectural Journal "Architehti" and in the British "Architectural Review", and eventually reached the New York's prestigious "Modern Redux" exhibition.

Künnapu and Padrik together with Andres Siim took part of the second international competition in 1988 at the West Coast Gateway in Los Angeles and won second place. The original task was to create a large cultural centre above an 8-lane freeway in Los Angeles. The conceptual idea was based on simple scheme - two long beams placed above freeway. The abyss between the beams was filled with various communications and geometric forms in which the functions of the building were located.

After establishing the company Künnapu & Padrik in 1994, the Methodist Church in Tallinn was designed (built in 2000). The multifunctional church represented a sign of changes in the social attitude. The previous business buildings which were oriented to capitalism was now changing towards civil society. The focus of a sculptural and ship-like building is centered around the entrance with the tower reaching into heights.

During the 1990s they created more pragmatic but spiritually charged projects from office buildings to private houses.

Among their work stand out the Hotel Radisson SAS (1999) and Viru Centre (2004) in Tallinn, Tigutorn (2008) and AHHAA Science Center (2012)in Tartu.

Tigutorn, built in 2008, is a clear example of the architects style. Shell shaped building is fragmented with the rhythm of windows. The building was one of the first high-rise buildings in Tartu and its structure distinguishes itself from its surroundings.

== Other ==
Together with Ignar Fjuk he has published multiple numbers of Ehituskunst (during 1981-1984).

He is a yoga teacher and initiator and architect in The Flower of Life Park.

== Built projects ==
- Sindi Sohkoz Center (1974)
- Summer Cottage in Klooga (1976)
- Raikküla kolhoz centre building (1981)
- Harju KEK complex in Keila (1979), with Rein Tomingas
- Tallinn Methodist Church (1994), with Vilen Künnapu
- Group of houses, Tallinn, Vabaõhukooli rd. 11 (1997), with Vilen Künnapu
- Previous EVEA bank building, Tallinn (1998), with Vilen Künnapu
- Roadhouse in St.Petersburg Road, Jõelähtme (1998)
- Office building, Pärnu mnt 105, Tallinn (1998), with Vilen Künnapu
- Tallinn Botanic garden palmhouse (1999), with Vilen Künnapu
- Radisson SAS hotel, Tallinn (1999), with Vilen Künnapu
- Tallinn Viru Center (2004), with Vilen Künnapu
- Triumph Plaza, Tallinn (2006), with Vilen Künnapu
- Tartu Tigutorn (2008), with Vilen Künnapu
- AHHAA Science Center, Tartu (2012), with Vilen Künnapu

== Unrealized projects ==
- Tallinn Secondary School of Science extension, first reward (1981), with Vilen Künnapu
- Parc de la Villette, international competition, Paris (1982), with Vilen Künnapu
- Arctic Center, international competition, Finland (1984), with Lennart Meri and Vilen Künnapu
- West Coast Gateway, international competition, Los Angeles (1988), with Andres Siim and Vilen Künnapu
- Proposal for Kevajärvi village and the Arctic house, international competition, Finland (1991), with Vilen Künnapu
- Teenindusmaja reconstruction project (1991), with Vilen Künnapu
- Urban park planning, Tallinn (1993), with Vilen Künnapu
- Life Center (1994), with Vilen Künnapu
- Hansabank Tallinn main building (1994), with Vilen Künnapu
- Hotel “Latvija”, renovation project, Riga (1999), with Vilen Künnapu

== Acknowledgments ==
2001 Order of the White Star
