= Parque de las Ciencias (Granada) =

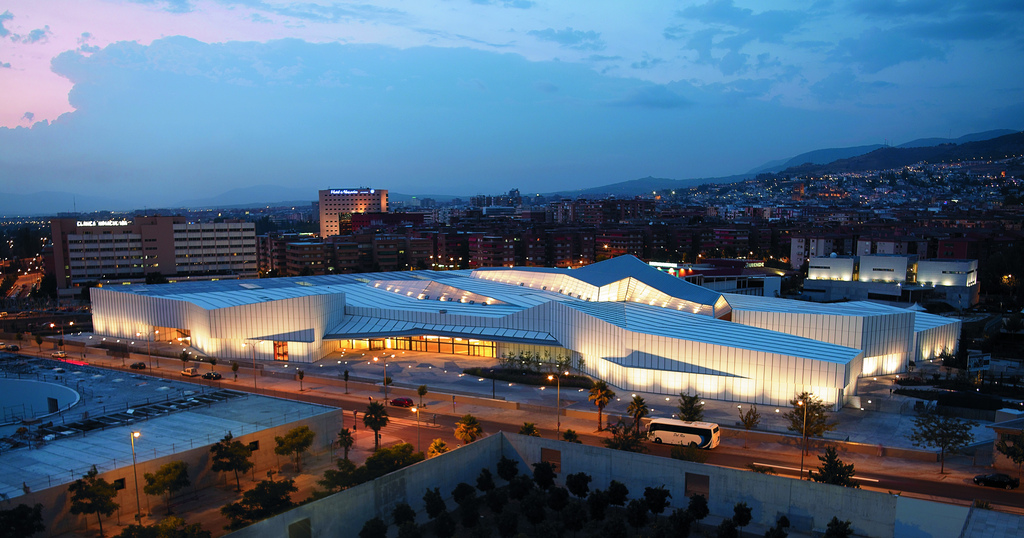
- Parque de las Ciencias, view of Macroscopio building
- Established: 8 May 1995; 31 years ago
- Location: Granada, Andalusia, Spain
- Coordinates: 37.162576°N 3.606149°W
- Type: Science museum
- Website: www.parqueciencias.com

Parque de las Ciencias is a science center and museum located in the city of Granada, Spain. It is a member of the European Network of Science Centers and Museums (ECSITE). The facility encompasses 70,000 square meters and offers a variety of experiences. These include permanent and temporary exhibits, a planetarium, educational spaces, and amenities like a cafe, restaurant, bookstore, library, and cinemas. Additionally, the Parque de las Ciencias has unique features such as a plastination lab and restoration and production workshops.

== Contents ==
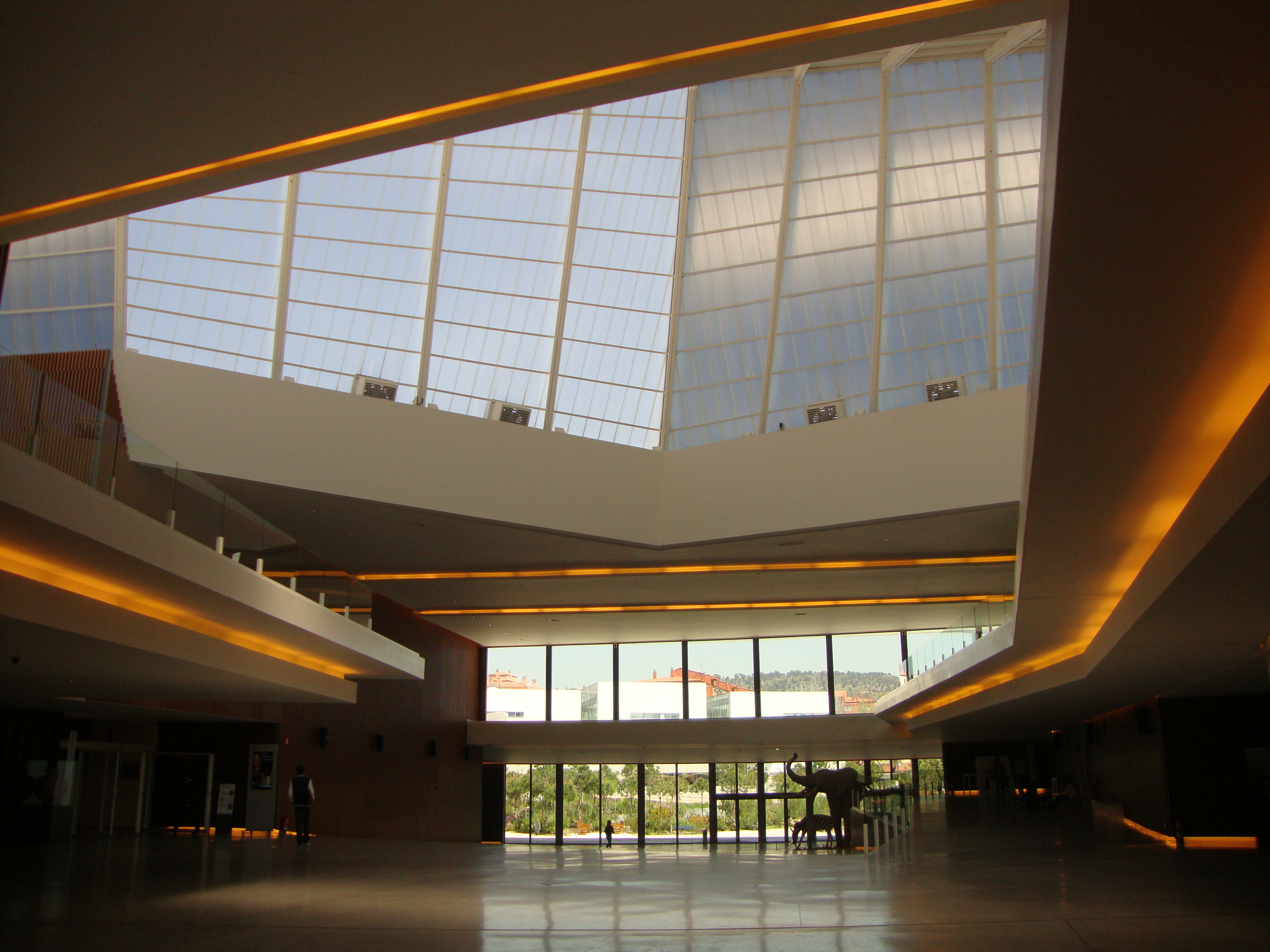
Hall of Macroscopio building

=== Macroscopio building ===
Macroscopio building is an expansion of Parque de las Ciencias and was designed by the architect Carlos Ferrater. It features a large entrance hall that leads to various exhibition areas.

==== Journey to the Human Body Pavilion ====
The Journey to the Human Body Pavilion explores various aspects of health and life sciences. This reflects the growing public interest in these topics, driven by factors like increased leisure time, greater access to education, and longer lifespans. The pavilion aims to provide a comprehensive overview of the human body, anatomy, senses, biomedicine, transplants, new medicines, genetics, nutrition, ecology, and life expectancy. It connects these diverse fields to create a holistic understanding of health and life sciences.

Life sciences are exceptionally important today and a great deal of interdisciplinary research is being carried out into the field. Discovering how the human body works has always been a tremendous intellectual and scientific challenge. Knowledge has allowed scientists to carry out exhaustive research into illnesses, disorders, functional anomalies and deformities which have, for many years, caused suffering and death. The history of medicine is, on the one hand, the history of humans’ persistent curiosity and desire to understand the world, and, on the other, the history of the struggle between illnesses and the longing to be as healthy and well as possible. The hall also includes exhibits on the development of techniques used in science related to health, life, and the study of human beings: instruments and methods used to represent the body using models, recordings or photographs, as well as some of the most modern examination techniques, microscopic displays, digital simulation, etc. Because the exhibits are scientific and educational, the hall strikes a balance between highly valuable historical objects and exhibits and real organs, interactive experiments, virtual reality, IT models, scale models, scenographic exhibits, reproductions, videos, workshops, etc.

The contents of the hall have been designed taking into account the inter-relationships between life and health sciences and physical sciences (pulleys, levers, slanted surfaces, energies...) and the chemistry of life.

==== Risk Prevention Hall ====
This hall is a fun, interactive teaching space, full of exhibits which help visitors to understand the wide range of different risks and hazards to which we are exposed. The exhibits use elements and materials which are easy for visitors to understand and get close to, such as simulators, symbols, and audiovisual exhibits. Visitors walk around set routes which show situations where risk agents are present. These risk agents can harm the human body if they come into contact with it, and they are grouped according to production and social sectors. Each route shows how vulnerable our bodies are in both physical and psychological terms. This pavilion was awarded in 2013 by DASA Arbeitswelt Ausstellung Museum.

==== Al-Andalus and Science Pavilion ====
The scientific and technological legacy of al-Andalus brought to life.

==== Techno-Forum Pavilion ====
An area for new technologies, innovation and art.

==== Explore the Museum's Treasure Trove Hall ====
This makes science accessible to young children through discovery and exploration.

=== Foucault Pendulum Building ===
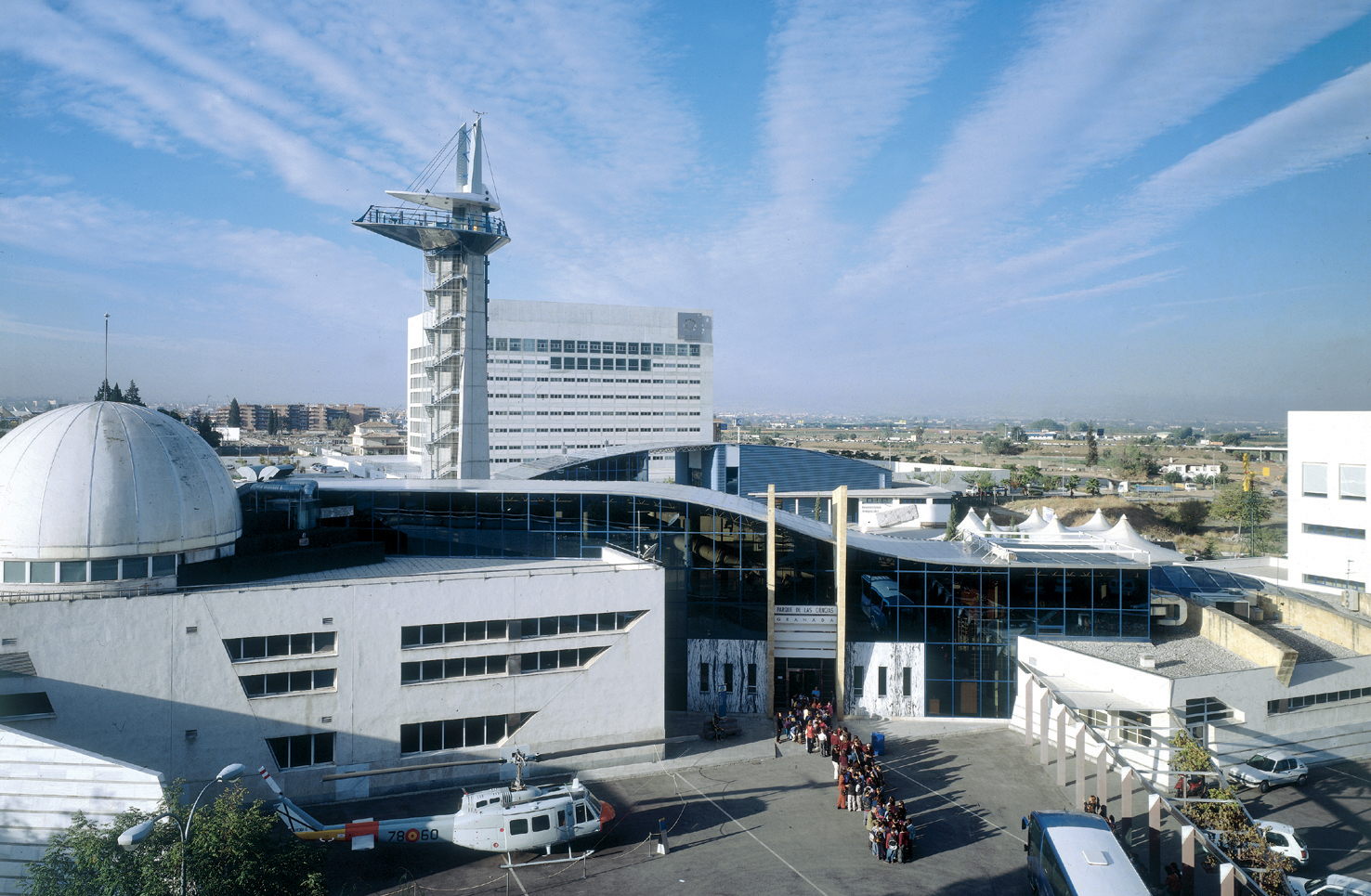
Péndulo de Foucault building

This is one of the most emblematic buildings in the Parque de las Ciencias complex. This was the first part of the museum and it was opened in May 1995. It houses a great deal of the museum’s content in its four permanent exhibition halls: the Biosphere, Eureka, Perception and Explora halls. The Planetarium is also located in this building. It was designed by architects Francisco Pastor and Francisco Maeso.

==== Biosphere ====
This hall contains exhibits related to life on Earth. Modules designed using the latest in contemporary museum technology take visitors on a journey to deepen their understanding of Earth.

==== Perception ====
This hall is linked to the world of the senses. Light and sound, and the relationship between these phenomena and the way in which we can perceive them, are the key elements studied by the modules in this hall.

==== Explora ====
This part of the museum is aimed at visitors between 3 and 7 years of age. Exhibits have been specially designed to bring children closer to science: scales, dice, water games, sound, self-perception, etc...

==== Eureka ====
This hall gives visitors the chance to experience physical phenomena and solve problems using interactive exhibits. Gyroscopes, levers, pendulums, the Venturi effect, gears.... these are just some examples of the experiments which give visitors the chance to have fun while they learn.

==== Planetarium ====
The Planetarium has a 10 m dome and is equipped with 120 projectors which recreate the night sky and its more than 7,000 stars. This is a real treat for astronomers these days, as it is becoming more and more difficult to see the sky so clearly in our cities.

=== Outdoors ===
The Parque de las Ciencias also has outdoor exhibits in 27,000 m² of garden areas. This is one of the things that sets its apart from other museums, as it takes advantage of the good Andalusian weather to bring its exhibits outside.

==== Birds of Prey in Flight Workshop ====
In this workshop visitors can experience an eagle swooping past just a few centimeters away and see a falcon hunting its prey. They can also learn what a vulture has to eat, and how owls fly. The workshop is split into two parts: a teaching session, when they will see the birds and find out about their biology and ecology, and a flying display, when they will be able to see them soar, hunt and eat. The workshop also emphasizes the important role that birds of prey play in keeping ecosystems healthy, and explains why conservation is so important.

==== Tropical Butterfly House ====
The Butterfly House recreates the tropical climate The temperature inside the Butterfly House ranges between 21 and 24 °C with a humidity of 70%, just perfect for the 20 species of butterfly from South-East Asia, Central and South America and Tropical Africa and the more than 40 species of tropical and subtropical plants. The life cycle of these insects can be seen from the moment the caterpillars hatch until they turn into butterflies.

==== Observation Tower ====
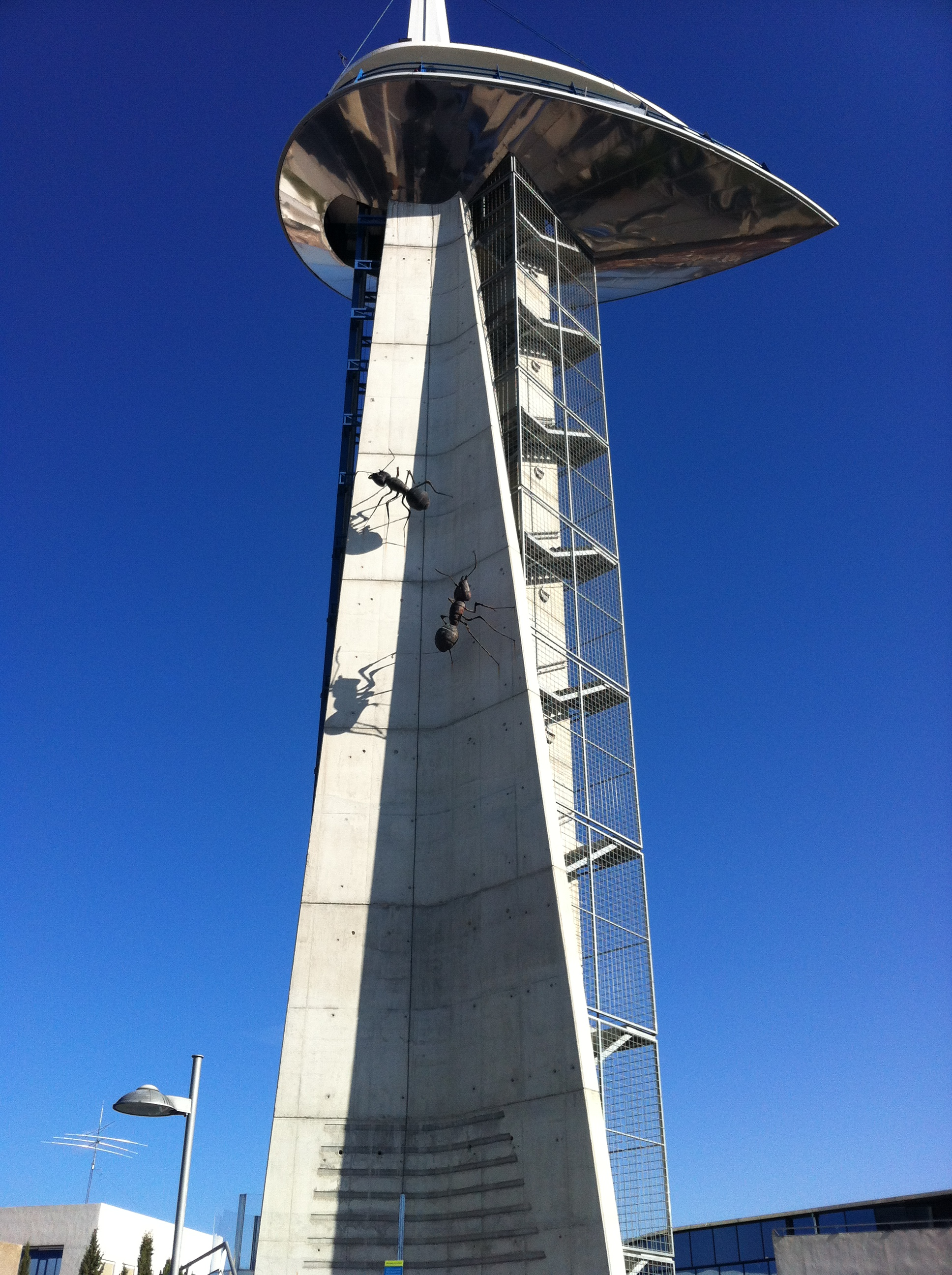
Observation Tower

This is one of the most emblematic pieces of architecture in the Parque de las Ciencias complex. The tower is 50 metres high and has a viewing terrace which looks out onto the nearby Mulhacén mountain – an unbeatable viewpoint over Granada.

==== Astronomical Observatory ====
This building is home to a Steavenson telescope with a 75 cm-wide mirror. This telescope was donated by the Institute of Astrophysics of Andalusia. The Observatory is the venue for the monthly “Nights of Astronomy” programme, and is also perfect for watching eclipses, meteor showers, etc....

==== Natural Spaces Hall ====
RENPA Permanent exhibition created by the Ministry of the Environment of the Autonomous Government of Andalusia, on Andalusia’s Protected Natural Spaces, characteristic ecosystems, flora, fauna, geology and landscapes.

==== Botanical Walks ====
Four spaces which show different aspects of the biology, typology and diversity of Mediterranean plants and the relationships between them, the animal world and the landscape. Visitors can see more than 300 different plant species as they follow the pathways.

==== Plant Maze ====
Plant walk around paths and squares with different themes: water, sand and flowers.

==== Scientific and Technological Heritage ====
The museum also focuses on scientific and industrial heritage, using historical pieces to show visitors the technological changes that have taken place over the last few centuries.

==== Water Games ====
The mechanisms which have been invented since ancient times to transport and elevate water also have their own place in the Parque de las Ciencias.

==== Astronomy Garden ====
This garden contains a collection of observation instruments used throughout history, as well as models designed to follow the relative movements of the Sun, the Earth, the Moon and the stars.

==== Mental Gymnastics Tent ====
A giant chess board, the Towers of Hanoi, a Möbius Strip, jigsaws and topological puzzles – these are just some of the brainteasers found in the museum gardens which visitors can use to give their brains a workout.

==== BioDome ====
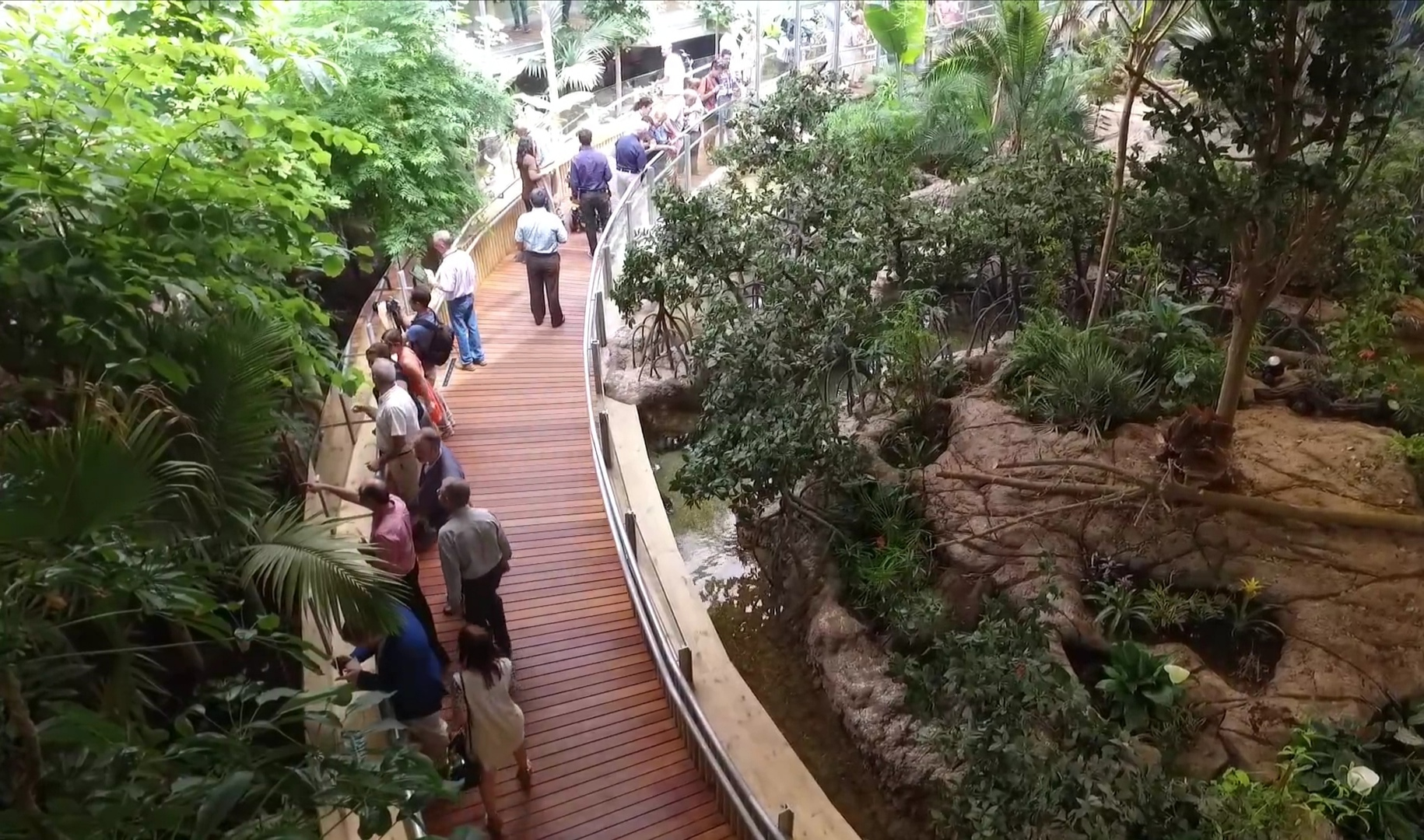
Interior of the BioDome

The BioDome is a museum facility dedicated to the education, conservation, and research of planet Earth's biodiversity. It was inaugurated in July 2016 and recreates different habitats in the tropical fringe of the planet, housing around 250 species of animals and plants, mainly from the Amazon, Madagascar and different areas of the Indo-Pacific area, like the Mekong River or the Sulawesi.

The pavilion houses three routes: one underwater, with different aquariums that show the diversity of species in both marine and river ecosystems; another terrestrial, where visitors find different species of mammals such as ring-tailed lemurs or reptiles such as the Chinese alligator, and recreations of habitats such as mangroves or rice fields. In the aerial route, there are birds such as the white-breasted toucan among species such as the two-toed sloth or amphibians such as arrowhead frogs.

The objectives of this space are education on the importance of biodiversity and the maintenance of these ecosystems for the sustainability of the planet, together with support for conservation projects, both within the BioDome and in the places of origin themselves. Furthermore, its facilities contribute to the development of research projects that are carried out in transparent laboratories for visitors.
