= European Network of Science Centres and Museums =

Network organization of science centres and museums in Europe

ECSITE
- Network Organization of Science Centres and Museums in Europe
- Founded: 1991; 35 years ago
- Type: Nonprofit
- Purpose: Science Centres & Museums
- Location: Brussels, Belgium
- Coordinates: 50.819882°N 4.3710431°E
- Region served: Europe
- Members: Over 400
- Key people: Catherine Franche (Executive Director), Bruno Maquart (President), Ulrike Kastrup (Vice-President)
- Website: www.ecsite.eu

The European Network of Science Centres and Museums (ECSITE), is a not-for-profit organisation initiated in 1989.

In 1991, it was formed under Belgian jurisdiction to facilitate communication and cooperation among Science Centres and Museums in Europe.

ECSITE is linking science engagement professionals of over 400 institutions in 50 countries for projects, activities and to facilitate the exchange of ideas and best practice on current science issues.

While many countries have national networks consistent of science centres, international networks like Ecsite, provide through their annual network conference science centre personnel to gather, share expertise, and discuss key issues.

Sister networks focusing similarly on science engagement in different regional context and gather science engagement professionals are:

- Association of Science and Technology Centers (ASTC)
- Asia Pacific Network of Science and Technology Centres (ASPAC)
- Network for the Popularization of Science and Technology in Latin America and The Caribbean (RedPOP)
- North Africa and Middle East science centres (NAMES)
- Southern African Association of Science and Technology Centres (SAASTEC)

== Projects ==
Ecsite coordinates and participates in collaborative projects with its member organisations with the goal of influencing the development of science engagement. These projects can be funded by the European Commission or run as initiatives organised in partnership with other organisations. As of 2023, Ecsite is involved in 8 projects involving 23 of its member institutions.

Project	Timeframe	Participating Organisations	Funders	Abstract	Website
Schools As Living Labs	2020-2023	Ellinogermaniki Agogi; The Lisbon Council for Economic Competitiveness and Social Renewal; University of Cyprus; Deusto University; Ciencia Viva; ORT Israel; NEMO Science Museum; TRACES Association; Intrasoft; Center for the Promotion of Science; Science Centre AHHAA; Blue World Institute	European Union´s Horizon 2020 Framework Programme for Research and Innovation	"A concrete new way to approach science education programs by fostering collaboration between schools and local communities based on an open-innovation methodology"	https://www.schoolsaslivinglabs.eu/
GlobalSCAPE	2021-2023	Universiteit Leiden; Association Europeene des Expositions Scientifiques Techniques et Industrielles; Qualia Analytics Limited; CAB International; Springer Nature Limited	European Union´s Horizon 2020 Framework Programme for Research and Innovation	"The principal aim of GlobalSCAPE is to generate a detailed picture of science communication in a global context. Recent research focused on taking stock and re-examining the role of science communication has concentrated primarily on science communication in Europe and the western world."	https://global-scape.eu/
SocKETs	2020-2023	Science Centre AHHAA; Centre for Research and Analyses; Centar za promociju nauke; Museo Nazionale della Scienza e della Tenologia 'Leonardo da Vinci'; Athena Institute; The Danish Board of Technology Foundation; Danish Technological Institute; Tecnalia Foundation; Italian Association for Industrial Research	European Union´s Horizon 2020 Framework Programme for Research and Innovation	"SocKETs brings together six European partners with the aim to test and develop methods and tools to align the development of Key Enabling Technologies with societal values and needs. SocKETs will facilitate co-creation between industry representatives, researchers, policymakers, end-users, civil society representatives and citizens, and will develop tools for societal engagement in innovative technologies."	https://sockets-cocreation.eu/
DOORS	2021-2023	Ars Electronica Linz GmbH & Co KG; Museum Booster GMBH	European Union´s Horizon 2020 Framework Programme for Research and Innovation	"DOORS (Digital incubator fOR muSeums) focuses on digital maturity of small and medium-size institutions and the empowerment of their teams. The central question is how the museum sector can develop digital strategies and values to adapt and reinvent themselves to strengthen their performance, reach their audiences and develop new ones, and ensure financial recovery and sustainability."	https://ars.electronica.art/doors/en/
Make it Open	2020-2023	The Bloomfield Science Museum Jerusalem; Copernicus Science Centre; Tom Tits Experiment; Centro Ciencia Viva De Lagos; Mobilis Kiállítási Központ; Bucharest Science Festival; Museos Científicos Coruñeses; Waag Society; Fixperts Ltd.; European Schoolnet; Columbia University	European Union´s Horizon 2020 Framework Programme for Research and Innovation	"Led by Bloomfield Science Museum in Jerusalem, and with 7 Ecsite members as part of the Consortium, Make it Open supports schools in becoming agents of community well-being. The project will help schools collaborate with enterprises and civil society organisations in order to run activities where children solve challenges in and with the community, using tools and approaches from the maker movement."	https://makeitopen.eu/
TechEthos	2021-2023	Science Center Netzwerk; iQLANDIA Science Center Liberec; Bucharest Science Festival; Centar za promociju nauke; Parque de las Ciencias; Vetenskap & Allmänhet; AIT Austrian Institute of Technology	European Union´s Horizon 2020 Framework Programme for Research and Innovation	"New and emerging technologies bring with them new ethical challenges and societal consequences. TechEthos will develop guidance to ensure the highest ethical standards are adopted at the EU and international levels. In this endeavour, Ecsite members play a crucial role in understanding and further developing societal perspectives through a programme of public engagement events, in-depth dialogues, exhibitions and analyses."	https://www.techethos.eu/
WATER-MINING	2020-2024	NEMO Science Museum; Parque de las Ciencias; Technische Universiteit Delft; Sealeau; KWR Water; Fundacio Eurecat; National Technical University of Athens; S.EL.I.S Lampedusa; Centro de Investigaciones Energeticas, Medioambientales y Tecnologicas-Ciemat; Dechema Gesellschaft Fuer Chemische Technik und Biotechnologie; Brunel University London; The University Court of the University of Aberdeen; Water Europe; Resolution Research; Universita Degli Studi di Palermo; Stichting Wetsus; Universidad Autonoma de Barcelona; Stichting Joint Implementation Network; ACSA; Institute of Communication and Computer Systems; Haskoningdhv; Kanzler Verfahrenstechnik; Larnaca Sewerage and Drainage Board; Acciona Agua; Universidad de Santiago de Compestella; Jerusalem Institute for Israeli Studies; Aguas do Algarve; Revolve; European Network of Living Labs; Water & Energy Intelligence; Lenntech; Titan Salt; Sofinter; The Vasantdada Sugar Institute; Thermosol Atmolevites Anonimi Etaireia; Nouryon Industrial Chemicals; Floating Farm Holding; MADISI	European Union´s Horizon 2020 Framework Programme for Research and Innovation	"The main objective of WATER-MINING project is to contribute to the implementation of the Water Framework Directive and the Circular Economy packages by showcasing and validating innovative water resources solutions. The project has selected a number of innovative technologies that reached proof of concept levels under previous EU project. The demonstration case studies are to be first implemented in five EU countries (The Netherlands, Spain, Cyprus, Portugal and Italy) where prior successful technical and social steps have already been accomplished."	https://watermining.eu/
Road-STEAMer	2022-2025	Ellinogermaniki Agogi SA; TRACES / Espace des Sciences Pierre-Gilles de Gennes; The Lisbon Council for Economic Competitiveness; Universitat ta Malta; Politecnico di Milano; Science View; Zentrum fur Soziale Innovation; Ingegneria Informatica; Panteion University of Social and Political Sciences; European School Heads Association; University of Exeter	European Union´s Horizon 2020 Framework Programme for Research and Innovation	"The overall aim of the project is to develop a STEAM roadmap for science education in Horizon Europe, i.e. a plan of action that will provide guidance to EU's key funding programme for research and innovation on how to encourage more interest in STEM through the use of artistic approaches, involving creative thinking and applied arts (the “A” in ‘STEAM’)."	

== See also ==
- List of science centers
