= Peeter Saari =

Estonian physicist and academician (born 1945)

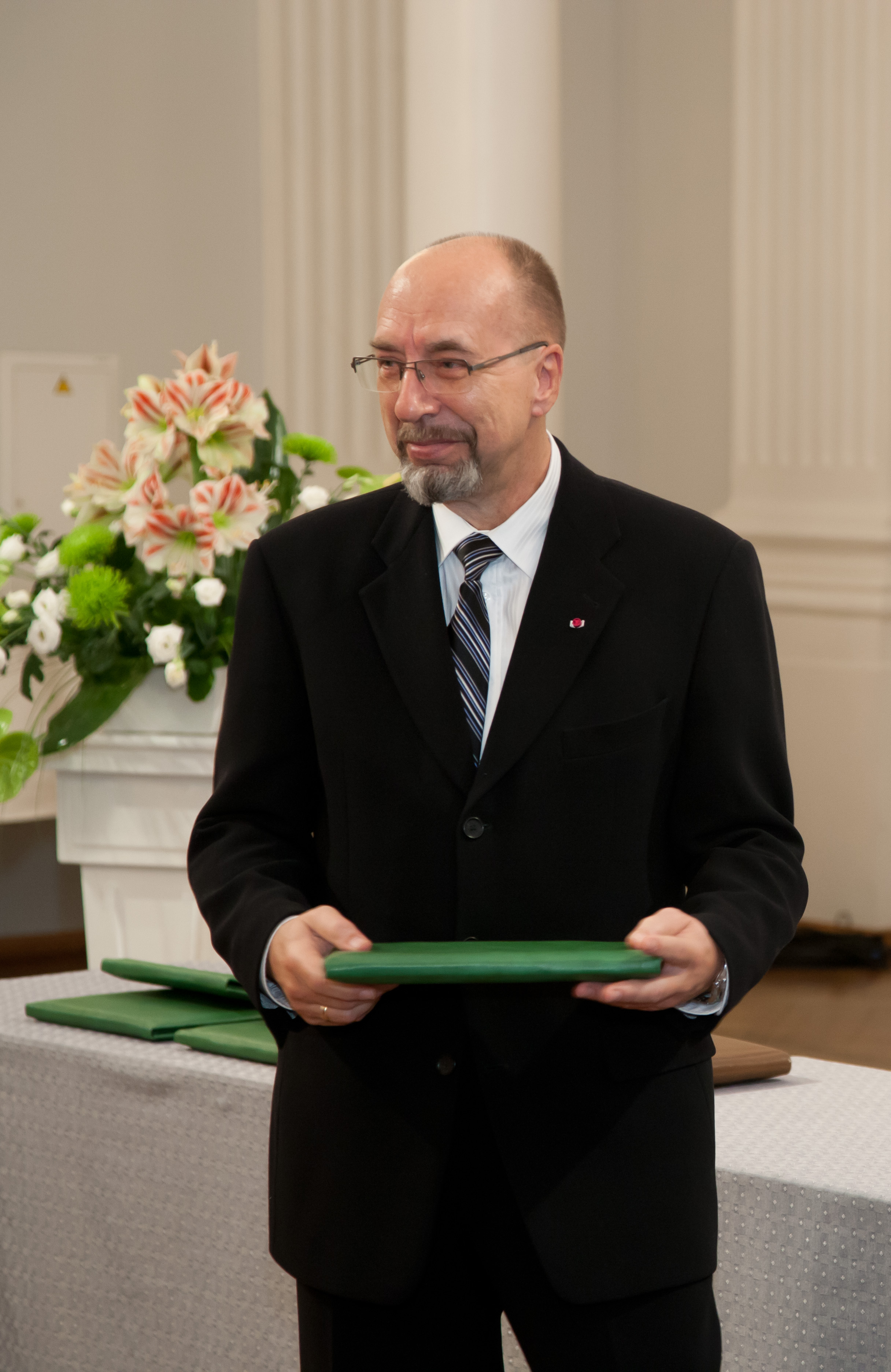
- Saari at the World Cultural Council award ceremony in Tartu (2011)
- Born: June 2, 1945; Tallinn, then part of Estonian SSR, Soviet Union
- Education: University of Tartu
- Awards: Estonian National Science Award (2000) Order of the White Star (III class, 2002); Honorary Citizen of Tartu (2014); Estonian National Science Award (lifetime achievement, 2019) Optica Fellow (2017)
- Scientific career
- Fields: Physical optics, Ultrafast optics
- Workplaces: University of Tartu

Peeter Saari (born 2 June 1945) is an Estonian physicist whose work spans optical spectroscopy of solids, ultrafast optics and wave optics. He was a professor of wave optics at the University of Tartu (currently a professor emeritus) and has been a member of the Estonian Academy of Sciences since 1986.

== Early life and education ==
Saari was born in Tallinn on 2 June 1945. He graduated from Tallinn Secondary School No. 21 in 1963 and received a bachelor's degree in theoretical physics at the University of Tartu in 1968.

== Career ==
Saari's academic career has been closely associated with the Institute of Physics in Tartu, which was formerly part of the Estonian Academy of Sciences and later became part of the University of Tartu. He led the Laboratory of Crystal Spectroscopy (later physical optics) from 1976, and served as director of the institute in 1981–1988.

He defended his Candidate of Sciences dissertation in physics and mathematics in 1972, and his doctoral dissertation in 1980; he was awarded the Doctor of Sciences degree in 1981. He received the title of professor in 1994 and has been professor of wave optics at the University of Tartu since 1997.

Saari was elected a member of the Estonian Academy of Sciences in 1986 in the field of physics. He belongs to the Department of Mathematics, Astronomy and Physics at the academy and served as the head of the Department of Astronomy and Physics from 2004 to 2009. He was elected a member of the Academia Europaea in 2003 and a Fellow of Optica (the American Optical Society) in 2017.

Since 2021, he has been Professor Emeritus at the University of Tartu. His CV is available here.

== Research ==
Saari's research has included hot luminescence and vibronic relaxation in solids, temporal–spectral diagnostics and synthesis of ultrashort optical pulses, time–space (four-dimensional) holography, and propagation-invariant and other structured light fields in wave optics. In 2000 he received the Estonian National Science Award in exact sciences for a cycle of work on non-diffracting light waves.

== Scientific service ==
Saari has held scientific leadership roles in Estonia, including service on the governing bodies of the Estonian Academy of Sciences and leadership roles connected with national research funding and science policy.

== Honours and awards ==
Among Saari's awards are:

- Estonian National Science Award (exact sciences), 2000
- Order of the White Star, III class, 2002
- J. N. Denisyuk Medal, inventor of spatial holography, from the Rozhdenstvensky Optical Society, 2011
- Honorary Citizen of Tartu, 2014
- Estonian National Science Award (lifetime achievement), 2019
- Optica Fellow, 2017

== Selected publications from P. Saari's various research fields ==
(Complete list is available here )

- Correlation of multiplets in different electronic transition of 1, 12 benzperylene in solid matrices (co-author T. Tamm). // Chem. Phys. Lett 30 (1975) 2
- Hot luminescence and relaxation processes in resonant secondary emission of solid matter (co-author K. Rebane). // J. Lumin. 16 (1978) 3
- Picosecond spectrochronography (co-author A. Freiberg). // IEEE J. Quant. Electr. QE-19 (1983) 4
- Picosecond time- and space-domain holography by photochemical hole burning (co-authors R. Kaarli, A. Rebane). // J. Opt. Soc. Am. B (1986) 3, 4
- Suppression of temporal spread of ultrashort pulses in dispersive media by Bessel beam generators (co-author H. Sõnajalg). // Optics Lett. 21 (1996) 15
- Evidence of X-shaped propagationinvariant localized light waves (co-author K. Reivelt). // Phys. Rev. Lett. 79 (1997) 21
- Optical generation of focus wave modes (co-author K. Reivelt). // J. Opt. Soc. Am. A 17 (2000) 10
- Localized waves in femtosecond optics. // Ultrafast Photonics (eds. A. Miller, D. T. Reid, D. M. Finlayson). Inst. of Physics Publishing, Bristol, Philadelphia (2004)
- Generation and classification of localized waves by Lorentz transformations in Fourier space (co-author K. Reivelt). // Phys. Rev. E 69 (2004) 3
- Laterally accelerating Airy pulses. // Opt. Express 16 (2008) 10303
- Libateaduse anatoomiast ja taksonoomiast (Eng. transl.: On the anatomy and taxonomy of pseudoscience). // Akadeemia 20 (2008) 2225
- Basic diffraction phenomena in time domain (co-authors P. Bowlan, H. Lukner, M. Lõhmus, P. Piksarv, R. Trebino). // Opt. Express 18 (2010) 11083
- Photon localization revisited. // Quantum Optics and Laser Experiments (ed. S. Lyagushyn). InTech – Open Access Publisher, (2012) 49
- Diffraction of ultrashort Gaussian pulses within the framework of boundary diffraction wave theory (co-authors P. Piksarv, P. Bowlan, M. Lõhmus, H. Valtna-Lukner, R. Trebino). // Journal of Optics 14 (2012) 015701
- X-type waves in ultrafast optics. // Non-diffractive waves (eds. H. E. Hernández-Figueroa, M. Zamboni-Rached, and E. Recami, Wiley (2013) 109
- On the vector model of angular momentum. // European Journal of Physics 37 (2016) 055403
- Reexamination of group velocities of structured light pulses. // Phys. Rev. A, 97, (2018) 063824
- Relativistic aberration and null Doppler shift within the framework of superluminal and subluminal nondiffracting waves (co-author I. Besieris). // J. Phys. Commun. 4 (2020) 105011
- Wave pulses with unusual asymptotical behavior at infinity (co-author I. Besieris). // J. Opt. Soc. Am. A 42 (2025) 1810
- Orbital and spin current density backflow in unidirectional monochromatic electromagnetic fields in vacuum (co-author I. Besieris). // J. Opt. 28 (2026) 065606
