= Catherine Vidal =

French neurobiologist

Catherine Vidal (born 7 July 1951) is a French neurobiologist, feminist and essayist. She is the author of popular science books in the field of cognitive differences between genders.

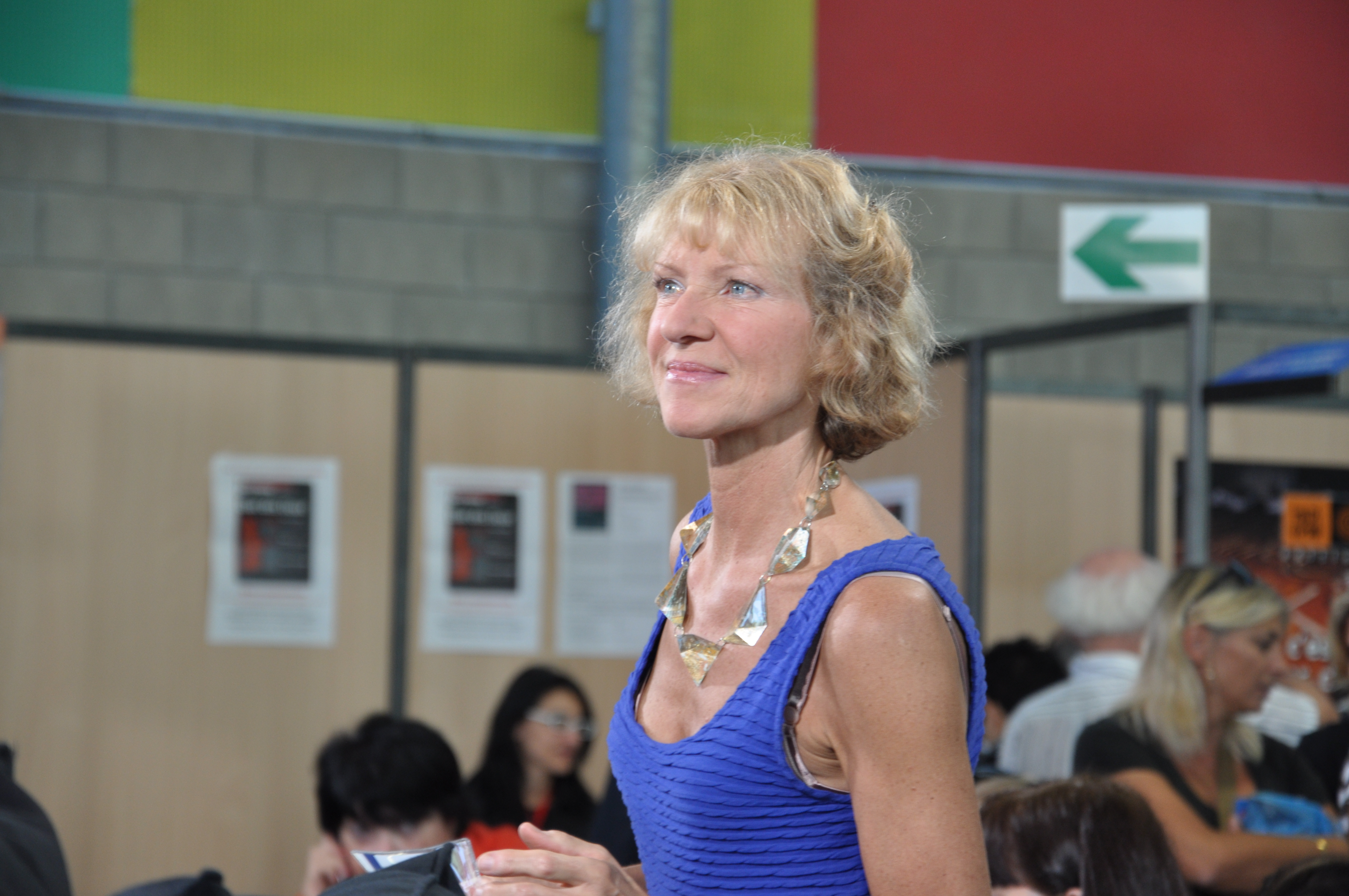
Catherine Vidal at the 2012 Mouans-Sartoux Literature Festival..

== Biography ==
She obtained her doctorate in 1986 at Pierre and Marie Curie University, Paris, under Pierre Buser. Her thesis concerned stress, nociception and body temperature. She pursued a research career at the Pasteur Institute, from 1981 to 2014; she was appointed research director there in 1997 and worked in areas including infection of the brain by the AIDS virus, neuronal death in Creutzfeldt-Jakob disease and prion infections. She authored popular science books on the ethical issues of neuroscience, determinism in biology, neuroplasticity, brain sex and gender. She suggests that rather than just genetics, the differences in the skills and behaviour of men and women are the products of a cultural environment and social construction related to gender which influences brain development because of neuroplasticity.

She is a member of the Émilie duChâtelet Institute, UN Women France, the Equality Laboratory, the Women & Science association and is co-director of the Égale à Égal collection. She was co-founder of the NeuroGenderings network (fr:Réseau NeuroGenderings) in 2010 and has been a member of the Inserm ethics committee since 2013, where she is co-director of the Gender and Health Research working group. Lauren Bastide wrote a biographic radio broadcast of her on Les Savantes, on France Inter on July 15 2017.

== Professional criticism ==
In the journal L'Obs in 2014, the biologist Jacques Balthazart criticised the theories of Catherine Vidal, not questioning neuroplasticity but expressing the opinion that biology plays a significant role in the differentiation of male and female behavior as well as in sexual orientation and gender identity.

In 2014, researchers Franck Ramus and Nicolas Gauvrit published in the journal Science et pseudo-sciences an article entitled La 'Méthode Vidal', in which they express the opinion that "the synthesis that Catherine Vidal makes of it is extremely biased, incomplete, and that the arguments it uses do not support its conclusions."

In 2016, Claudine Junien, Jacques Balthazart, Franck Ramus and six other signatories, in a free forum published by Le Monde, cite several works on the differences between men and women at the cerebral level and contest Vidal's opinions about cerebral plasticity.

== Publications ==
- (with Dorothée Benoit Cerveau, sexe et pouvoir [Brain, sex and power] Paris, Belin, 2005, 110 p. (ISBN 978-2-7011-3858-9).
- Féminin Masculin. Mythes et idéologies [Feminine, Masculine. Myths and Ideologies] Paris, Éditions Belin, coll. « Regards », 2006, 123 p. (ISBN 2-7011-4288-1).
- Hommes, femmes: avons-nous le même cerveau? [Men, women: do we have the same brain?] Paris, Le Pommier, 2007, 56 p. (ISBN 978-2-7465-0322-9).
- (with Sylviane Giampino) Nos enfants sous haute surveillance: évaluations, dépistages, médicaments… [Our children under close observation: assessments, screening, drugs...] Paris, Albin Michel, 2009, 283 p. (ISBN 978-2-226-18999-8).
- Cerveau, sexe et liberté[Brain, sex and freedom] Gallimard/ CNRS (EAN 3260050645720).
- Le cerveau évolue-t-il au cours de la vie? [Does the brain evolve during life?] Paris, Le Pommier, 2009, 55 p. (ISBN 978-2-7465-0438-7).
- Les filles ont-elles un cerveau fait pour les Maths? [Do girls have a brain made for maths?] Paris, Le Pommier, 2012, 63 p. (ISBN 978-2-7465-0588-9 et 2-7465-0588-6).
- The Sexed brain: between science and ideology, from Critical studies of the sexed brain Springer, Neuroethics, 2012.
- The Sexed Brain: from Neurosexism to Neuroethics, from Gendered Ways of Knowing in Science FBK Press, 2012.
- Neuro-Pedagogy of the Gender Theory in Gendered Neurocultures Vienna, Zaglossus.
- Nos cerveaux, tous pareils, tous différents! [Our brains: all the same, all different!] Belin, from Egale à Egal 2015.
- Femmes et santé : encore une affaire d’hommes? [Women and health: still a man's business?] avec Muriel Salle, Belin, 2017, from Égale à Égal (ISBN 2410009336)
- Nos cerveaux resteront-ils humains? [Will our brains stay human?] Le Pommier, from Manifeste 2019, (ISBN 978-2-7465-1776-9)

== Awards ==
- Officer of the Legion of Honour (2019) ['Chevalier' (2009)]
- Marcel Blum Award (2016)
