= Jean-Didier Vincent =

French neurobiologist and neuropsychiatrist (1935–2024)

Jean-Didier Vincent (7 June 1935 – 4 December 2024) was a French neurobiologist and neuropsychiatrist. He was Professor of Physiology at the Faculty of Medicine of the University of Bordeaux II and then at the University of Paris-Sud. From 1991 to 2004 Vincent was Director of the Alfred-Fessard Institute of Neurobiology at the CNRS. He was a member of both the French Academy of Sciences and the French Academy of Medicine since 18 November 2003.

== Biography ==
Vincent was born on 7 June 1935 in Libourne, located in the Gironde department of Bordeaux. He was the only son of a Freemason wine broker.

He studied in Sainte-Foy-la-Grande (Gironde) at a Protestant college whose master intended him to study literature at the École normale supérieure, then at the Lycée Michel-Montaigne in Bordeaux. His parents, wine brokers and Protestants, encouraged him to undertake medical studies at the École du Service de Santé des Armées de Bordeaux. He majored in physics, chemistry and biology. As an intern in clinical services, he met the neuropsychiatrist Jacques Faure, who encouraged him to do research in this field.

Vincent was a hospital biologist in physiology and functional explorations at the CHRU of Bordeaux (1966-1977), Professor without a chair (1973-1978) and professor of physiology at the Bordeaux Faculty of Medicine (1979-1992). He headed the Inserm 176/CNRS "Neurobiology of Behaviours" unit at the Bordeaux University Hospital (1978-1990) before taking over as Director of the Alfred-Fessart Institute in Gif-sur-Yvette from 1992 to 2003. He was Professor of Physiology at the Faculty of Medicine of Paris Sud, Hospital Practitioner at the Kremlin-Bicêtre Hospital (1992-2006) and Professor at the Institut Universitaire de France, Chair of Neuroendocrinology at the Faculty of Medicine of Paris-Sud, Paris XI University (1994-2004).

In 1988, he signed the appeal to François Mitterrand. He has carried out research in neurobiology in the United States (postdoctoral fellowship at the Brain Institute of the University of California, Los Angeles) and then in France (CNRS, Inserm).

Vincent was President of the National Council of Programmes at the Ministry of National Education from 2002, a member of the CNRS Ethics of Science Committee (COMETS) and the INRA (Institut National de Recherché en Agronomie) Ethics and Precaution Committee for Agricultural Research Applications (COMEPRA). A member of the Executive Board of the Foundation for Political Innovation until 23 January 2009, he has been President of the Association pour l'Université Numérique Francophone Mondiale (UNFM) since October 2005.

Married to Yveline Ricoul and later to Lucy Kukstas, he had five children. Jean-Didier Vincent died on 4 December 2024, at the age of 89.

== Scientific contributions ==
Vincent contributed significantly to the development of neuroendocrinology, which includes the study of interactions between hormones and the nervous system, the brain being also considered as an endocrine gland. He has a more pessimistic vision than his colleague Boris Cyrulnik about what predetermines human behaviour and believes in the primacy of the biological over reason, stating in 2013 in the film La Possibilité d'être humain : "L'homme est libre, oui, mais en liberté surveillée".

He published numerous books on the theory of biology, for example, Biologie des passions, La Chair et le diable. In his book he defends a dynamic above all sexual dynamics of love (Eros). He lists the sexual practices that are omnipresent in nature and suggests that the notion of women's property was born during the sedentarization of the Neolithic era. It also details the complexity of sexual systems, which are often designed to frame the reproductive rules of each species.

In his book Bienvenue en Transhumanie, he takes a sceptical look at transhumanism, denouncing a lack of morality that is necessary around this radical transformation of the genome. He fears a disconnection between reproduction and sexuality, and that sexuality is virtualized by directly stimulating the affected parts of the brain.

== Other functions ==
- Member of the American Academy of Arts and Sciences
- Member of the Academia Europaea
- Member of the Royal Academy of Belgium (science class)
- Honorary Member of the Royal Academy of Medicine of Belgium
- Member of the French Academy of sciences
- Member of the French Academy of Medicine

== Awards and honours ==
- 1981: La Caze Prize from the Academy of Sciences
- 1991: Blaise-Pascal prize
- 1996: Medicine and Culture Award from the Institute of Health Sciences
- 1998: Gold medal at the University of Prague
- 1999: Doctor honoris causa of the Free University of Brussels
- 2010: Honorary President of the Société historique et archéologique de Libourne
- Officer of the Légion d'Honneur
- Commander of the Ordre des Palmes Académiques
- Knight of the Ordre du Mérite Agricole

== Books ==
Jean-Didier Vincent has written several books, the most famous of which is La Biologie des passions and Élisée Reclus, géographe, anarchiste, écologiste which has received the 2010 Femina essai prize.

- La Biologie des passions, éditions Odile Jacob, 1986 et coll. Opus 1994
- Casanova, la contagion du plaisir, éditions Odile Jacob, 1990, (prize Blaise-Pascal)
- Celui qui parlait presque, éditions Odile Jacob, 1993
- La Chair et le Diable, éditions Odile Jacob, 1996
- L'Art de parler la bouche pleine, Éditions de la Presqu'Ile, 1997
- La vie est une fable, éditions Odile Jacob, 1998
- Qu'est-ce que l'homme ?, éditions Odile Jacob, 2000
- Faust : une histoire naturelle, éditions Odile Jacob, 2000
- La Dispute sur le vivant, éditions Desclée de Brouwer, 2000
- Pour une nouvelle philosophie du goût, 2000
- Le Cœur des autres - Biologie de la compassion, éditions Plon, 2003
- Voyage extraordinaire au centre du cerveau, éditions Odile Jacob, 2007
- Élisée Reclus géographe, anarchiste, écologiste, éditions Robert Laffont, 2010 (prize Femina essai)
- Le Sexe expliqué à ma fille, éditions du Seuil, 2010
- Bienvenue en Transhumanie, avec Geneviève Ferone, éditions Grasset, 2011
- Le Cerveau sur mesure, avec Pierre-Marie Lledo, éditions Odile Jacob, 2012
- Biologie du couple, éditions Robert Laffont, 2015
- Le cerveau expliqué à mon petit-fils, éditions du Seuil, 2016

== Polemics ==
=== On Down's syndrome ===
On 5 October 2012, during the programme La Tête au carré, broadcast on France Inter, a new test likely to diagnose Down syndrome in early pregnancy was discussed. Vincent defended this prenatal diagnosis, claiming that "Down's syndrome is a poison in a family. " During the programme, Jean-Didier Vincent revisited this statement, which was considered "violent" by host Mathieu Vidard, and withdrew it, calling it an "unfortunate term" but without apologizing. Éléonore Laloux, a young woman with Down syndrome and spokesperson for the collective Les Amis d'Éléonore, responded to the biologist in 2013 in a video and in March 2014 in her autobiography Triso et alors!.

=== On GMOs ===
During the same programme, Vincent defended the firm Monsanto and made the following comments: "we must use GMOs", "it has rendered great services to agriculture", "it has increased productivity."

=== Conviction ===
On 12 February 2008, during the television show Ce soir ou jamais, he said about Jean-Marie Le Pen: "We knew him as the white wolf, he was a bastard", and added: "he probably committed crimes, but I can't say it on the air". On 28 May 2009, the Paris Court of Appeal found him guilty of insult (first sentence) and defamation (second sentence), and sentenced him to a suspended fine of €1,500 and €4,000.
