= Ignar Fjuk =

Estonian architect, politician and radio journalist (born 1953)

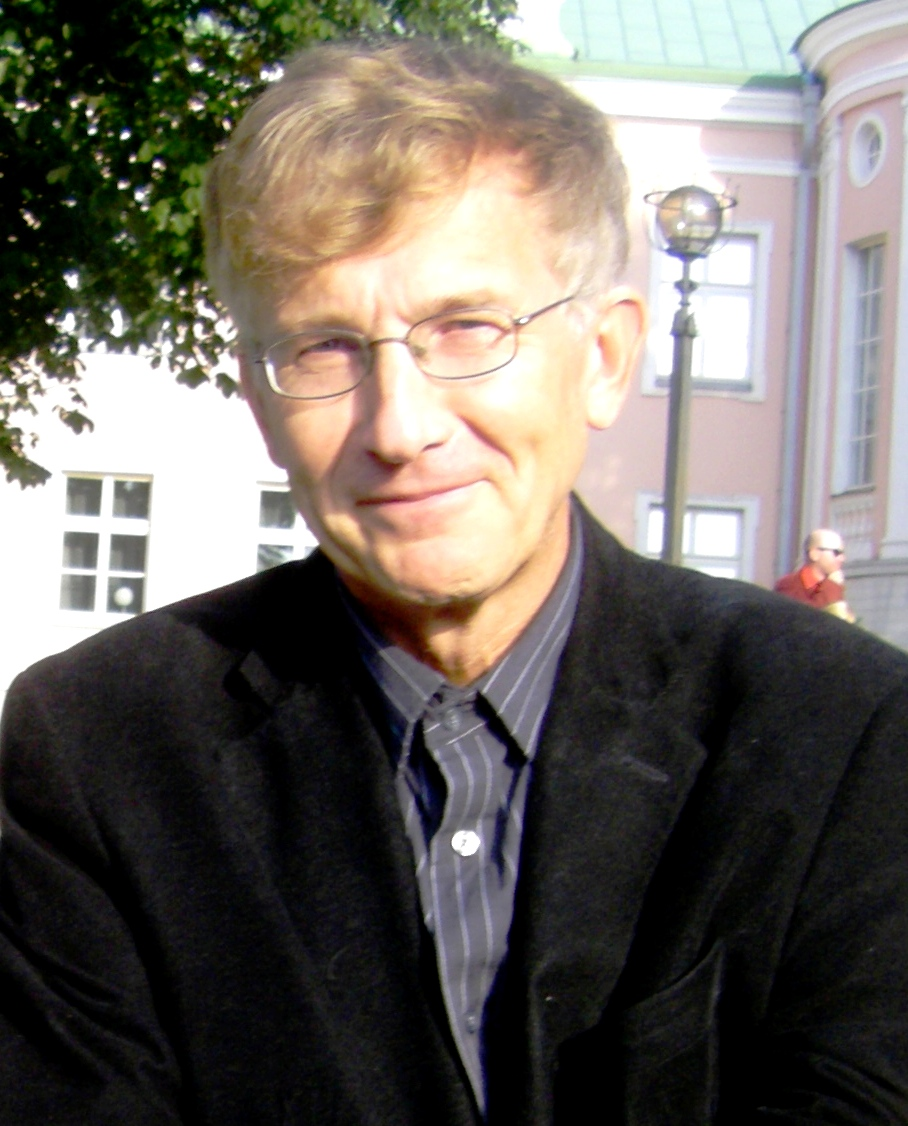
Ignar Fjuk in 2011

Ignar Fjuk (born 12 March 1953) is an Estonian architect, politician, and radio journalist, most notable for being one of the voters for the Estonian restoration of Independence.

Born in Tartu, Fjuk graduated from Hugo Treffner Gymnasium in 1971 and from the Estonian Academy of Arts in 1976 as an architect. For years, Klassikaraadio has been broadcasting his Räägivad talk show. In 1987, the Culture Council of the Estonian SSR's Artistic Associations was created on his initiative. In 1989, as a deputy to the Soviet Congress of People's Deputies, he stated "We won't declare independence; we'll simply take it."

Fjuk was a member of the Estonian Centre Party and currently belongs to the Estonian Reform Party. He was a member of the Constitutional Assembly, as well as a member of the Riigikogu, the Estonian parliament. Fjuk, along with Estonian, speaks English, Russian, and Polish.

== Awards ==
- 2001: 3rd Class of the Estonian Order of the National Coat of Arms (received 23 February 2001)
