= Vilen Künnapu =

Estonian architect

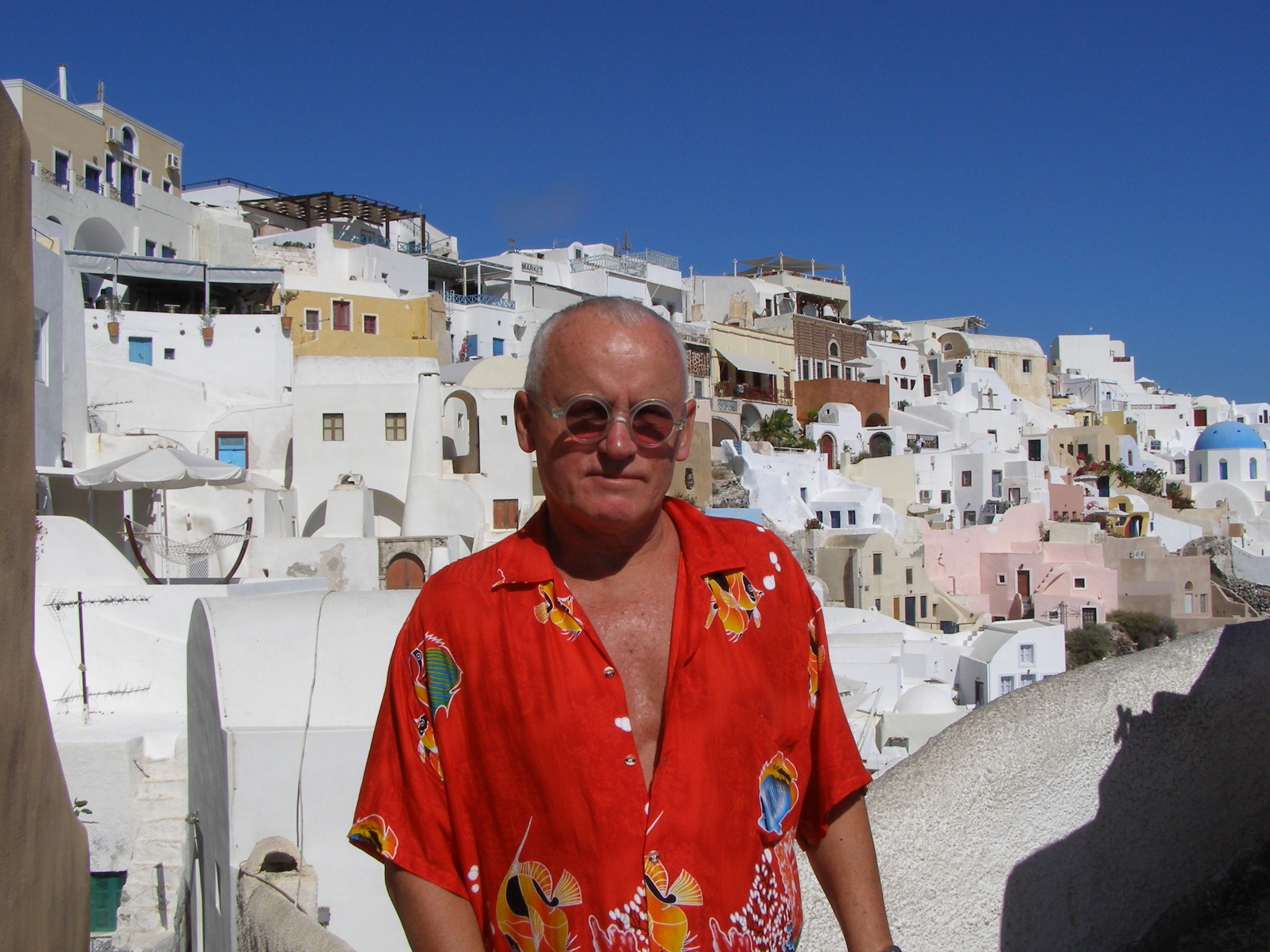
Vilen Künnapu, 2009

Vilen Künnapu (born 30 June 1948) is one of the most important Estonian architects of the last three decades, among the first postmodernist theoreticians and architects in the 1970s.

He has worked on various buildings in Estonia and abroad.

From 2000, he has been a professor at the Tallinn University of Technology. Between 2006 and 2007, he was a professor at the University of Tartu.

== Style ==
Künnapu graduated from the Estonian Academy of Arts in 1971. Among the first houses Künnapu designed was the centre of the Põlva collective farm in Estonia. Designed in Künnapus early twenties it features a long staircase, inner courtyard, foyer, a small hall and back yard ran along the centre's axis resembling a Latin American ziggurat. The white walls standing on the hill contrast against the dark blue shadows of the white symmetrical prisms forming a spatial instrument that surprises with the finality of its regulation.

The Collective Farm Centre in Valgu is a composition of two white buildings in the heart of the small town. The clubhouse, with an elongated plan on one side of the crossroads, has the screen of its main façade which dates from the previous century. Across the road, a white colonnade connects the office with a standard canteen of the sixties. The club is an elongated structure, but only with a primitive plan. In the foyer stands a five-metre wooden sculpture and the long colonnade of the office block is a bow to the architecture of small towns.

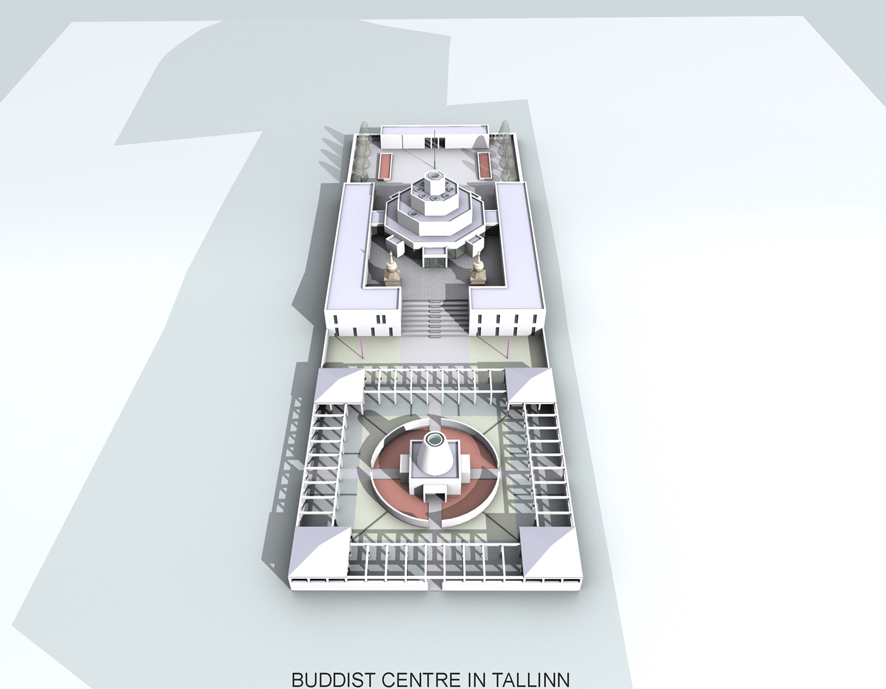
Buddhist Centre in Tallinn (2005)

== Energy Center Architecture ==
Since London Architecture Biennial 2004 Künnapu's architectonic interest has been directed towards architectonic structures that are supposed to act as mediators between existing human beings and higher entities. The line of Energy Center Architecture include projects and realizations of churches, temples, meditation centres, towers and museums. In the spiritual architecture Künnapu is linked with shamans and witches as well as with renown international architects and artists, such as Nathaniel Kahn.

The Temples and Towers – this kind of architecture is related to big mysteries. They are thought to be mediators between the existing human beings and higher realities. These models are incarnations of the energy centre architecture of the Egyptians, Mayas, Buddhists, Copts, Hindus, Sufis and many others in every time and in everywhere. Vilen Künnapu has played himself out of time and out of place. This architecture does not qualify to the material speculations of the world as we know it. If we would be talking about religion, architecture would be theology and Vilen Künnapu a mystic. Prof. Marco Casagrande on Künnapu.

== See also ==
- List of Estonian architects
