= Asso Kommer =

Estonian politician

Asso Kommer (born 17 July 1966 in Pärnu) is a former Estonian soldier and a politician.

In 1993, Kommer led a voluntary formation of the Estonian army, the Läänemaa Vabatahtlik Jäägrikompanii. The formation was ordered to requarter from Haapsalu to Paldiski. Concerned about an inevitable confrontation with much larger Russian military units who were still quartered on the base, he refused the order on behalf of his company. Estonian military command responded by issuing an order relieving Kommer from duty, which Kommer did not honour, leading to the Pullapää crisis, which ended in Kommer's conviction of several crimes and resignation of two ministers.

== Pullapää crisis ==
In 1991, Kommer became a shooting range instructor of the Pärnu branch of Estonian Defence League. By 1993, he had risen to be a leader of the Läänemaa Vabatahtlike Jäägerkompanii. On 6 July 1993, his company was ordered to requarter from Haapsalu to a former Soviet base in Paldiski. Fearing a possible conflict with significantly larger Russian military units that were still stationed at the base, he refused the order on behalf of his company. Estonian authorities responded by relieving him from duty and demobilising the unit, but both of these orders were refused. By end of July, the (now demobilised) company and a number of its civilian supporters were preparing for a battle at Pullapää, but this didn't occur. Instead, Hain Rebas, then Estonian Minister of Defence, resigned on 3 August 1993, and, the military opposition having wound down, the crisis was further handled as a criminal rather than military matter.

On 4 September 1993, Asso Kommer and two other men took a businessman, Pavel Kalmõkov, into their car in Tallinn, and Kalmõkov ended up missing. (Later, on 9 December, Kommer directed the investigators to the place of Kalmõkov's burial.) On 26 November 1993, a firefight between Kommer and police occurred, under unclear circumstances, and Koit Pikaro and Argo Aunapuu, two police officials, end up wounded by bullets fired by Kommer. Kommer was arrested the same day. On the next day, 27 November 1993, however, Lagle Parek, Estonian Minister of Internal Affairs, resigned over the incident.

=== Sentence ===
On 26 November 1993, Kommer was convicted of unlawful imprisonment, resisting arrest with lethal force (he wounded two policemen, Koit Pikaro and Argo Aunapuu), and of military rebellion, and sentenced to six years and six months of imprisonment. He requested a pardon from Lennart Meri, then President of Estonia, but it was denied. He was ultimately released in 1998 on account of good behaviour.

=== Feud with Koit Pikaro ===
During arrest of Kommer, he shot several bullets into a leg of Koit Pikaro, then an employee of Estonian police, under circumstances that are not entirely clear. This began a long feud between him and Pikaro, mostly manifested by occasional hostile statements made in public press.

== Professional affairs ==
Having been released from imprisonment, Kommer became an instructor of the Estonian Boy Scout organisation's Pärnu branch.

In 1999, a controversy emerged when it was made public that as a part of his instruction's survival training programme, he had demonstrated to his group skinning and field preparation as food of a domestic cat. In a public explanation, Kommer stressed that the cat hadn't been stray, nor was it stolen, but its owner, a local farmer who was in trouble with its custom of killing chickens, had given it to Kommer's group.

As of 2007, Kommer is still a Boy Scout instructor.

== Recent political activity ==
On 31 May 2006, Kommer applied for membership of Keskerakond, a party whose member Pikaro had been for many years. Pikaro, in line with this feud, issued a statement opposing acceptance of Kommer into the party. Ain Seppik, who back in 1993 had belonged in a commission investigating Kommer's activities and who is now a member of the board of Keskerakond supported Pikaro's opposition, leading to the board not accepting the application, and requesting the local Pärnu branch office of the party to reconsider. Five months later, Pärnu branch office decided to defer the decision until 2007, possibly until after a new board of Keskerakond would be elected. As of September 2007, no final decision is known to have been published.
