= Estonian Newspaper Association =

Organization based in Estonia

The Estonian Newspaper Association (Estonian: Eesti Ajalehtede Liit) is an umbrella organisation representing common interests of newspapers published in Estonia. As of July 28, 2007, it represents 41 publications.

The association was established in 1990 and has been a member of World Association of Newspapers since 1991.

== Estonian Press Council ==
In 2002 the association established the Estonian Press Council (Avaliku Sõna Nõukogu), with the purpose of the supervision of the Estonian press. It is a self-regulating body of the Estonian press. It provides a possibility to settle readers' complaints out of court, free of charge.

== Press Friend Award ==
Since 1994, the association has given out a yearly Press Friend award and an accompanying Press Enemy award. The Press Friend award comes with a stylised sculpture of a megaphone; there is no accompanying sculpture for the Press Enemy award.

Year	Press Friend	Press Enemy
1994	Mart Laar	Lennart Meri
1995	Siim Kallas	Edgar Savisaar
1996	Tunne Kelam	Tiit Made
1997	Paul Varul	Robert Lepikson
1998	Lennart Meri	Olari Taal
1999	Jüri Mõis	Lennart Meri
2000	Ivar Tallo	Toivo Jürgenson
2001	Ingrid Rüütel	Mart Laar
2002	Allar Jõks	Heiki Kranich
2003	Mati Alaver	Peeter Tali
2004	Marko Pomerants	Rein Lang
2005	Tõnis Lepp	Andres Lipstok
2006	Aadu Luukas (posthumously)	Enn Pant
2007	Juhan Kivirähk	Andrus Ansip
2008	Ivari Padar	Urmas Kukk
2009	Andres Arrak	Rein Lang
