= Congress of Estonia =

Grassroots parliament of Estonia 1990–1992

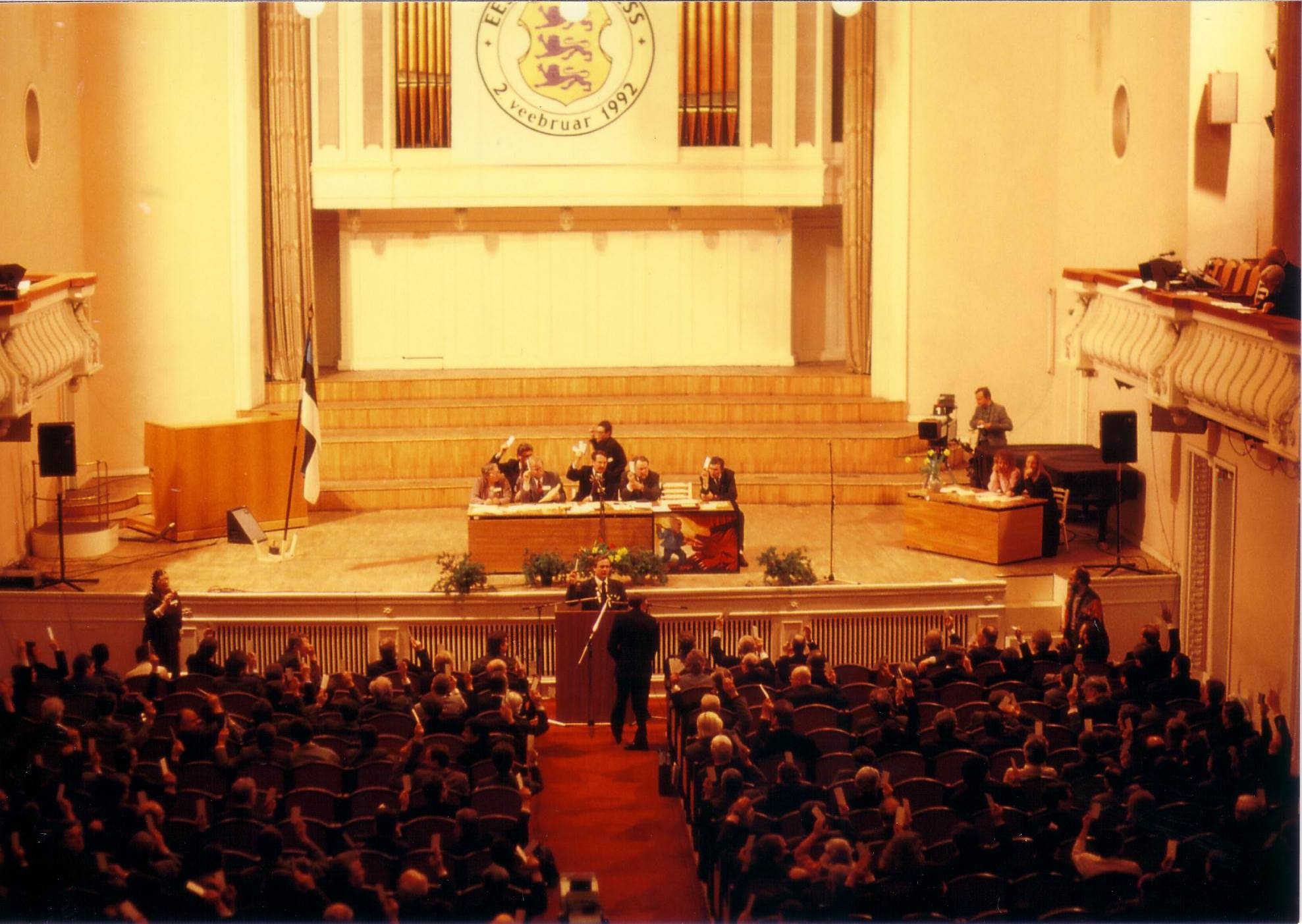
The Congress of Estonia in session (in the Estonia Theatre building, Tallinn, February 1992)

The Congress of Estonia (Estonian: Eesti Kongress) was a grassroots parliament elected in February 1990 in then Soviet-occupied Estonia and actively participating in the popular nonviolent resistance to the Soviet rule, which resulted in the restoration of the country's independence from the Soviet Union in August 1991.

In September 1991, a Constitutional Assembly was formed with half of its members elected from the Congress of Estonia to write a new constitution. The new Constitution of Estonia was approved by the referendum in June 1992, and the Congress dissolved itself in October 1992, once the freshly elected parliament of Estonia (Riigikogu) had been sworn in.

== Activity ==
After the Congress had been elected in February 1990 (in the first democratic nationwide elections held in Estonia since 1930s) it immediately posed a challenge to the authority of the other quasi-parliament in the country, the Supreme Soviet of the Estonian SSR (which was elected in March 1990). The Soviet occupation regime had been imposed on Estonia after the first Soviet invasion and annexation of the country in 1940−1941, and the Soviet reinvasion in 1944.

The Congress of Estonia declared that it represented the highest authority on questions of Estonian statehood and citizenship, deriving this authority from the consent and initiative of the citizens of Estonia. The aim of the Congress was to restore Estonian independence based on the principle of legal continuity, with the pre-1940 Republic of Estonia, which had been established in 1918, as the foundation.

In 1989, independence activists had formed a mass movement called the Estonian Citizens' Committees (Estonian: Eesti Kodanike Komiteed) and started registering persons who were Estonian citizens by birth according to the jus sanguinis principle, i.e., persons who held Estonian citizenship in June 1940 (at which point Estonia's de facto structures of state were systematically dismantled and reorganized, after the country had been occupied by the Soviet Union), and their descendants. Persons who did not satisfy these criteria were invited to file applications for citizenship. By February 1990, 790,000 citizens and about 60,000 applicants had been registered.

In February 1990, the election of a body of representatives of these citizens – the Congress of Estonia – was conducted by those who had been registered. The Congress had 499 delegates from 31 political parties. The Estonian National Independence Party (Estonian: Eesti Rahvusliku Sõltumatuse Partei, usually abbreviated as ERSP) won the most seats. Other parties represented included the Popular Front of Estonia, the Estonian Heritage Society and the Communist Party of Estonia. The permanent standing committee of the Congress of Estonia – the Committee of Estonia (Estonian: Eesti Komitee) – was chaired by Tunne Kelam.

In September 1991, a Constitutional Assembly was formed of equal numbers of members of the Supreme Council and the Congress of Estonia to work out a new Constitution. The new constitution was approved by referendum in June 1992, applying the constitution replacement process specified in the previous (1938) constitution as a matter of legal continuity of the Republic of Estonia. Both the Congress of Estonia and the Supreme Council (the renamed Supreme Soviet) dissolved themselves immediately after the new parliament (Riigikogu) had been elected (and sworn in, as per new constitution) in September 1992.

== Politics ==
March 1990 also saw the election of the Estonian Supreme Soviet. Unlike the previous Soviets, which had been formed in non-competitive sham "elections" and consisted largely of members of the Soviet Communist Party, the new Supreme Council, as the quasi-parliament soon started to call itself, was dominated by representatives of the Estonian Popular Front (including members with no party affiliation, who had recently left, or still belonged to, the Communist Party).

The main distinctions between the political ideas of the Congress of Estonia and the Supreme Soviet (Supreme Council) were:

- The Congress of Estonia stood for the principle of legal continuity of the Republic, in contrast to the "Third Republic" concept (after the First Republic of 1918–1940 and the Soviet Republic of 1940–1991), which was the Supreme Soviet's dominant position;
- The Congress of Estonia, as the Citizens' Committees before it, supported continuity in citizenship, as opposed to extending citizenship to all people with residential registrations (called propiska in Russian) in Estonia in 1990 (sometimes called the 'zero option citizenship' or 'clean state citizenship', Estonian: kodakondsuse nullvariant), including more than 300,000 occupation-era migrants from the Soviet Union.

Opposition on issues of substance between the Congress of Estonia and the Supreme Soviet over the first point was the primary reason that the Supreme Soviet did not "proclaim" or "establish" Estonia's independence during the 1991 August Putsch in Russia, and instead, as a compromise, decided to "reaffirm the independence". In later constitutional debates and decisions, the Congress of Estonia prevailed regarding these issues.

A small number of the members of the Congress of Estonia were Estonians who had gone into exile during World War II, or children of such refugees. Some of the delegates from the United States commented on the similarity of the Citizens' Committees of Estonia and Latvia (in the nineties, the Latvians had a movement analogous to the Estonian committees) to the American Committees of Correspondence, which were shadow governments organized by the patriot leaders of the Thirteen Colonies on the eve of the American Revolution. The American Committees of Correspondence played an important role in the events that led to the formation of the United States of America.

== Later developments ==
After the adoption of the new Constitution in 1992, a new Citizenship Law recognised the citizenship registrations of the Citizens' Committees as the initial legal registry of Estonian citizens. Citizens of the Soviet Union who had filed applications with the Citizens' Committees were enabled to be naturalised on the basis of a simplified procedure.

=== List of notable members ===
- Jüri Estam
- Liia Hänni
- Kaido Kama
- Jaan Kaplinski
- Tunne Kelam
- Mart Laar
- Marju Lauristin
- Tiit Made
- Lennart Meri
- Lagle Parek
- Hain Rebas
- Vardo Rumessen
- Ain Saar
- Edgar Savisaar
- Enn Tarto
- Indrek Teder
- Jüri Toomepuu
- Lauri Vahtre
- Arvo Valton
- Trivimi Velliste
- Ülo Vooglaid
