= Pullapää crisis =

Historical events in Estonia

- Date: July 6, 1993 until November 26, 1993
- Location: Pullapää, Estonia
- Goals: Defend Asso Kommer (Jäägrikompanii) Arrest Asso Kommer and disband the Jäägri kompanii (EDF)
- Result: Strategical Victory

Lead figures
Asso Kommer Jaak Mosin	Aleksander Einseln Hain Rebas (Resigned)

Units involved
Läänemaa Vabatahtlik Jäägrikompanii	Kuperjanov Battalion

Casualties
- Injuries: 1 (Koit Pikaro)
- Arrested: 2 (Asso Kommer and Jaak Mosin)

The Pullapää crisis of 1993 was a series of events involving military rebellion, possible vigilantism, firefight(s), and resignation of two Estonian ministers.

== Chronology ==
On 6 July 1993, Läänemaa Vabatahtlike Jäägerkompanii, a volunteer formation of the Estonian Army led by Asso Kommer, was ordered to requarter from Haapsalu to Paldiski. On 23 July, Aleksander Einseln issued an order relieving Kommer from duty and directing him to take a training course for officers, but Kommer also refused this order. And there was a reason. On 25 July, the company expressed their support for Kommer and announced they would "withdraw" from Estonian military command structure and are subordinate only to the president.

The Estonian government responded by demobilising the whole unit on 27 July, but once again, the company refused the order. The next day, the company left the facilities of Paldiski and went to Pullapää, as agreed. The Estonian military moved the Kuperjanov battalion, complete with armour units, to Jägala, and prepared for an attack, which fortunately never occurred. However, Kommer's company, which had heard a rumour that the President, Lennart Meri, had ordered an attack to begin at 16:00 on 31 July, prepared for such attack, and a number of members of the Defence League, as well as several women, joined the company in the preparations. The rumour's source has not been tracked down.

On 2 August, Estonian Internal Security Service arrested Jaak Mosin, a deputy leader of the (by then, demobilised) company Kommer was leading. As a response, the company withdrew its 25 June statement. On 3 August, Hain Rebas, the minister of defence, resigned. The military opposition wound down, and the crisis was further handled as a criminal rather than military matter.

On 12 August, a criminal investigation was launched against Asso Kommer and Jaak Mosin, on suspicion of abuse of power.

On 4 September, Asso Kommer and two other men took a businessman, Pavel Kalmõkov, into their car in Tallinn, and Kalmõkov ended up missing. (Later, on 9 December, Kommer directed the investigators to the place of Kalmõkov's burial.) On 12 September, Jaak Mosin, who had been released pending investigation, fled to Sweden and requested political asylum. On 26 November, a firefight between Kommer and police occurred, under unclear circumstances, and the police officials Koit Pikaro and Argo Aunapuu were wounded by Kommer. Kommer was successfully arrested later that day, but Lagle Parek, Estonian Minister of Internal Affairs, still resigned over the incident the next day.

On 26 November 1993, Asso Kommer was convicted of several crimes related to these events, and was sentenced to six years and six months of imprisonment.

== Analysis ==
Comparable incidents of military insurrections also happened in Latvia and Lithuania around the same time. Accordingly, Johannes Kert, an Estonian general, has expressed his conclusion that these were incited by a common foreign agent. No foreign involvement in any of these incidents has been proven; however, it is known that a member of Russian Federation's army had offered Russian citizenship to the whole company, "should the need arise".

A commonly cited background for the incident is Estonian military administrators' inability to organise acceptable living standards, and an approach, considered by some provocative or overly bureaucratic, towards the soldiers' petitions and complaints. (At least two such petitions by members of the Jäägrikompanii had gone unanswered, and a third had been answered on basis of insubordination rather than addressing the issues presented.) These problems might have ended triggering the active rebellion when the restationing order was issued.

However, the restationing order itself is surrounded by obscurity. Several months later, Hain Rebas, the Estonian Minister of Defence who resigned over the incident, testified to a governmental commission that he didn't know who had initiated the restationing. Asso Kommer has declared that the order was a provocation by the Estonian Army's staff of generals, and that it is this provocation that led to the unit's withdrawal from Estonian military command structure.

It is also generally accepted, and explicitly stated by Lagle Parek, the Estonian Minister of Internal Affairs who resigned over the incident, that several opposition politicians used the incident's background in an opportunist manner, to deliberately incite the conflict. Jüri Pihl has traced Kommer's support to Tiit Made, Kalle Eller, Jüri Toomepuu, Katrin Linde, and noted the company's contacts with Hardo Aasmäe, Tiit Madisson and Jüri Põld.

Hain Rebas has implied that the incident was masterminded by Tiit Made, who, according to him, might have been plotting a military coup. This was supported by circumstantial evidence collected during the criminal investigation; however, this evidence didn't lead to any further convictions. Made, nor any other politician (of 1993) has never been officially charged with the rebellion, or incitement to rebellion. (Asso Kommer's official political career began only in 2006, when he applied for membership of Keskerakond, but the application has been stalled for more than a year.)

On the other hand, Jüri Toomepuu, who publicly supported activities of Jäägrikompanii, claimed that Trivimi Velliste's activities were influenced by a foreign power or foreign powers.

Kalle Kulbok, a member of Riigikogu during the time and a leader of the Independent Royalist Party of Estonia, has said that the military preparations were centered on containment rather than attack, and Estonian army would only have fired if the Jäägrikompanii would have fired first.

== Aspects of vigilantism ==
In the 1990s, police suspected that members of the Jäägrikompanii were involved in murdering and burial of about 30 ethnic Russians involved with the (now probably defunct) Perm Bratva group. The company might have considered itself one of few forces capable of avoiding a supposed invasion by Russian organised crime interests. The company might in this context have behaved largely as a mere military arm of the Linnuvabriku gang consisting mostly of ethnic Estonians. (The Linnuvabriku group and the Perm Bratva group were involved in the so-called "metal war" over possession of large coloured metal shipments. In particular, a shipment of cobalt has been implicated.)

For an example, an incident involving Jäägrikompanii members forcing to stop several members of the Perm mafia group, whose corpses were later found in Jõgevamaa, buried in a farm belonging to a Linnuvabriku gangster's mother.
