= Nõmme (disambiguation) =

Nõmme is a district of Tallinn, Estonia.

Nõmme may also refer to:

== Places in Estonia ==
- Nõmme (subdistrict), subdistrict in Nõmme District, Tallinn
- Nõmme, Hiiumaa Parish, village in Hiiumaa Parish, Hiiu County
- Nõmme, Jõgeva County, village in Mustvee Parish, Jõgeva County
- Nõmme, Lääne-Nigula Parish, village in Lääne-Nigula Parish, Lääne County
- Nõmme, Haapsalu, village in Haapsalu City, Lääne County
- Nõmme, Lääne-Viru County, village in Väike-Maarja Parish, Lääne-Viru County
- Nõmme, Pärnu County, village in Lääneranna Parish, Pärnu County
- Nõmme, Rapla County, village in Rapla Parish, Rapla County
- Nõmme, Saaremaa Parish, village in Saaremaa Parish, Saare County

== People ==
- Andres Nõmme (1864–1935), Estonian politician
- Fred H. Nomme (born 1946), Norwegian diplomat
- Martti Nõmme (born 1993), Estonian ski jumper
