= Jüri Mõis =

Estonian politician and businessman

Mayor of Tallinn
- In office 6 November 1999 – 31 May 2001
- Preceded by: Peeter Lepp
- Succeeded by: Tõnis Palts

Minister of the Interior
- In office 25 March 1999 – 5 November 1999
- Prime Minister: Mart Laar
- Preceded by: Olari Taal
- Succeeded by: Tarmo Loodus

Personal details
- Born: 25 October 1956 (age 69) Pärnu, then part of Estonian SSR, Soviet Union

Jüri Mõis (born 25 October 1956) is an Estonian politician and businessman, who was mayor of Tallinn from 6 November 1999 to May 31, 2001, and who was the Minister of the Interior from 25 March until 5 November 1999. He is one of the three founders of Hansapank.

Political offices
Preceded by Olari Taal	Minister of the Interior; 25 March 1999 – 5 November 1999	Succeeded by Tarmo Loodus
Preceded by Peeter Lepp	Mayor of Tallinn; November 1999 – June 2001	Succeeded by Tõnis Palts
