= Lagle =

Lagle is an Estonian-language surname and Estonian-language feminine given name.

People:

- Lauri Lagle (born 1981), Estonian actor and director
- Lagle Parek (born 1941), Estonian politician
