= Asso (disambiguation) =

Asso is an Italian comune in the Province of Como.

Asso or ASSO may also refer to:

- Asso (film), a comedy directed by Franco Castellano and Giuseppe Moccia
- Asso Station, a train station in Kamitonda, Nishimuro District, Wakayama Prefecture, Japan
- Association of Revolutionary Visual Artists, a Communist artists organization in Germany (1928–1933)
- Isotta Fraschini Asso XI, a V12 piston aeroengine produced in the 1930s
- Asso Aerei, an Italian range of light and ultralight aircraft

== People with the name ==
- Ignacio Jordán Claudio de Asso y del Río (1742–1814), Spanish diplomat, naturalist, lawyer and historian
- Raymond Asso (1901–1968), French lyricist
- Asso Kommer (born 1966), Estonian politician and former soldier

== See also ==
- Asos, a village on the island of Kefalonia, Greece
- Assos, a town in Çanakkale Province, Turkey
