= August Peet =

Estonian politician

August Peet (25 April 1881, Pati Parish – unknown) was an Estonian lawyer and politician. Between 1918 and 1919, he was Minister of Internal Affairs.

Peet was arrested by the NKVD on 19 July 1940 in Tallinn. On 8 March 1941, he was sentenced to 8 years in prison. His fate afterwards is unknown.
