= Kroonpress =

Company based in Estonia

Kroonpress Ltd. is an Estonian printing company. Its headquarters are located in Tartu. Since 2009, the company owns the largest printing house in the Baltic states.

Since 1998, Kroonpress belongs to the Postimees Group. The company was established in 1990 in order to help to print the newspaper Postimees. The company founders were businessmen Alexander Kofkin and Olari Taal.

As of about 2020, the company is printing approximately 30 different newspapers and magazines.
