= Heiki Arike =

Estonian politician (1965–2018)

Minister of the Interior
- In office 14 December 1993 – 4 November 1994
- Prime Minister: Mart Laar
- Preceded by: Lagle Parek
- Succeeded by: Kaido Kama

Personal details
- Born: 5 May 1965 Tallinn, then part of Estonian SSR, Soviet Union
- Died: 9 October 2018 (aged 53)
- Education: Estonian University of Life Sciences

Heiki Arike (5 May 1965 – 9 October 2018) was an Estonian politician and a major in the Estonian Defence League, who was also Estonia's Minister of the Interior from 1993 to 1994.

Born in Tallinn, Arike studied at the Estonian University of Life Sciences from 1983 to 1990, graduating as an economist. From 1984 to 1986, he was in the Soviet Armed Forces.

From 1992 to 1993, he worked at the Tartu Internal Affairs Department, the Tartu Police Prefecture and as Undersecretary of the Ministry of Internal Affairs. From 1993 to 1994, he was the Minister of the Interior under Mart Laar.

In subsequent years, Arike has worked in several positions in public limited companies Medisk and Eesti Raudtee. In 2005, 2006 and 2007, he completed his duties at Maaväe as a specialist at CIMIC in Kevadtorm. He has been a national defense teacher at the Tallinn Service School and Jakob Westholm Gymnasium.

From 1999 to 2013, he was a major in the Toompea malev in the Estonian Defence League and was in charge of the Public Relations Department at the Defence League's General office from 2011 to 2015.

Arike died on 9 October 2018. He is buried at Tallinn's Forest Cemetery.

Before: Lagle Parek	Minister of the Interior of Estonia; 1993–1994	After: Kaido Kama
