= Ivar Tallo =

Estonian politician (born 1964)

Ivar Tallo (born 5 May 1964 in Tartu) is an Estonian political scientist and politician. He was a member of IX Riigikogu.

In 2000, Estonian Newspaper Association gave him the award "Press Friend of the Year".
