= Jüri Estam =

German-born Estonian journalist and politician

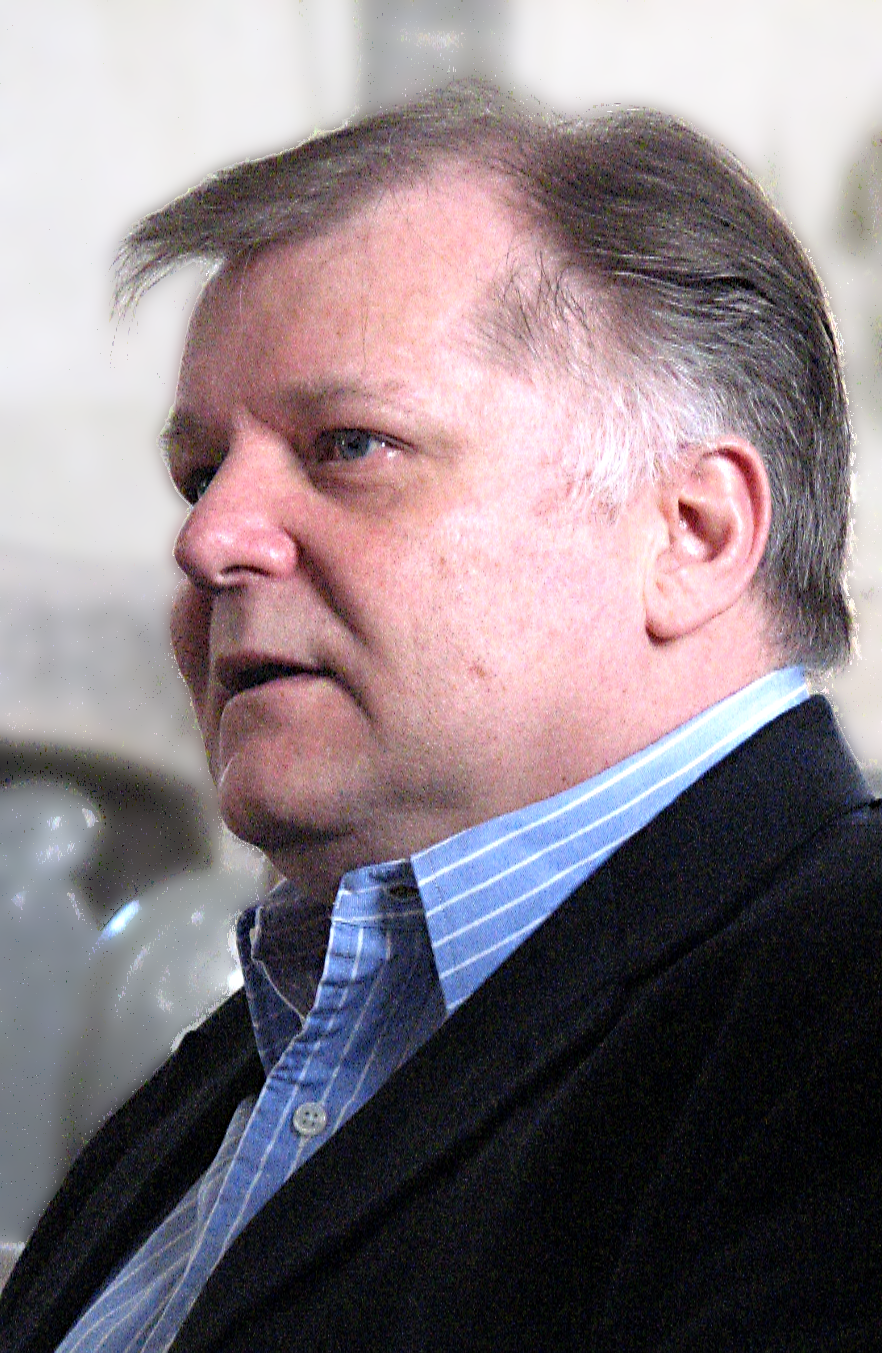
Jüri Estam

Jüri Estam (born 18 July 1951 in Osnabrück, Germany) is an Estonian journalist and politician.

From 1979 to 1989 he worked at Radio Free Europe's Estonian editorial office.

From 1990 to 1992 he was a member of Estonian Congress. From 1992 to 1994 he worked at Estonian Television. From 1995 to 1996 he was the head of Kuku Radio.

He has been a member of the party Libertas Estonia.

In 2006 he was awarded with Order of the National Coat of Arms, IV class.
