= Robert Lepikson =

Estonian politician, businessman and rally driver/co-driver (1952-2006)

Minister of the Interior
- In office 5 May 1997 – 28 January 1998
- Prime Minister: Mart Siimann
- Preceded by: Riivo Sinijärv
- Succeeded by: Olari Taal

Mayor of Tallinn
- In office 14 November 1996 – 30 April 1997
- Preceded by: Priit Vilba
- Succeeded by: Ivi Eenmaa

Personal details
- Born: 14 June 1952 Tallinn, then part of Estonian SSR, Soviet Union
- Died: 1 July 2006 (aged 54) Rakvere, Estonia
- Party: Centre Party

Robert Lepikson (14 June 1952 – 1 July 2006) was an Estonian politician, businessman and rally driver/co-driver.

As a rally driver, he was the Estonian champion three times, winner of the Baltic Cup and was the head of the Estonian motorsport league.

As a politician, he switched party memberships several times, having been a member of the Estonian Coalition Party, the Estonian Centre Party and the People's Union of Estonia. He was the mayor of Tallinn for 6 months, from 14 November 1996 to 30 April 1997. On 5 May 1997 he became Minister of the Interior of Estonia. On 28 January 1998 he lost his position as Interior Minister a result of conflicts caused by his out-spoken nature regarding fellow politicians in public.

In 1999, he was involved in a scandal in Estonian politics, in which Mart Laar used Edgar Savisaar's picture as a target on a shooting range. He was then part of the X Riigikogu from 2003 to 2006.

He died of a stroke in 2006.

Political offices
Preceded by Priit Vilba	Mayor of Tallinn; November 1996 – May 1997	Succeeded by Ivi Eenmaa
Preceded by Riivo Sinijärv	Minister of the Interior; 1997–1998	Succeeded by Olari Taal
Preceded by Tiit Soosaar	Governor of Võru County; 1998–2000	Succeeded by Mait Klaassen
