= Estonian Citizens' Committees =

Nonpartisan political movement in Estonia

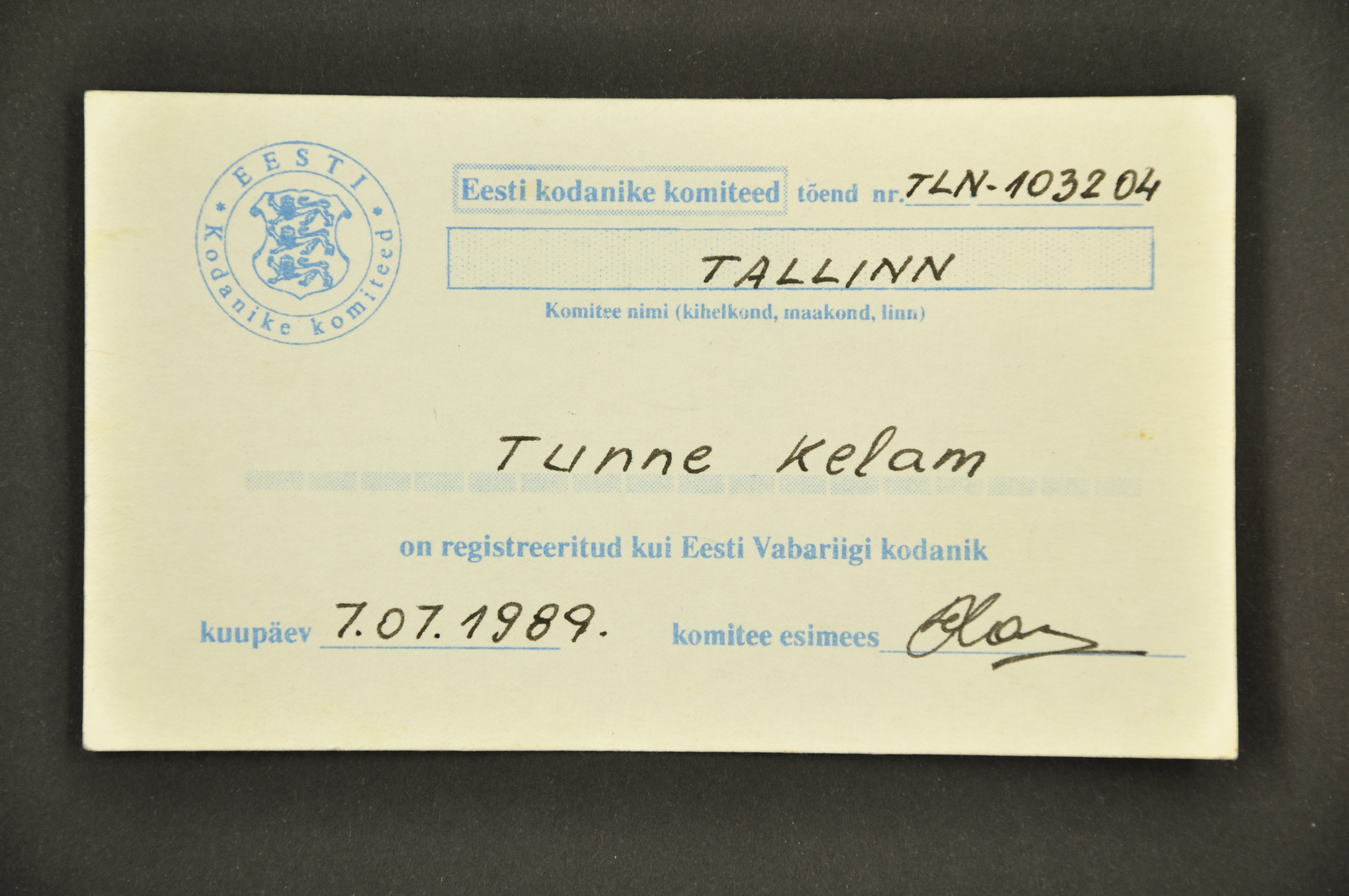
The registration card recognising Tunne Kelam as an Estonian citizen from 1989 that was issued by the Estonian Citizens' Committee.

The Estonian Citizens' Committees (Estonian: Eesti Kodanike Komiteed) was a nonpartisan political movement in Estonia, founded in 1989–1990, which had as its purpose the creation of power structures in order to restore the Republic of Estonia on the basis of legal continuity by

- registration of citizens of the Republic of Estonia,
- carrying out the elections of the Congress of Estonia, and
- convening the Congress of Estonia as a legislative body representing the citizens.

The first call for setting up these committees was made on February 24, 1989, – the 71st anniversary of the Republic's declaration of independence in 1918 – during a meeting of representatives of the Estonian Heritage Society, the Estonian National Independence Party ERSP, and the Estonian Christian Alliance. Legally, the initiative centered on the prewar constitution of 1938 of independent Estonia, which postulated that the Estonian people were invested with the highest level of power in the country. All legitime citizens, who registered as citizen, got blue card, all who wanted become citizen, got green card, and they got Estonian citizenship without language census. Since the structure of national and local governmental offices had been eliminated during Estonia's occupation by Nazi Germany and the Soviet Union, they would need to be recreated, starting with the registration of citizens.

The first Estonian Citizens Committee was founded on March 21, 1989, in Kadrina; the first county to set up such a committee was Kuressaare (10 April 1989). The first county committee was established on May 12, 1989, in Virumaa. Most of the registration effort was undertaken during the summer months.

The Citizen's Committees' movements led to a mass resignation of ethnic Estonians from the Estonian Communist Party in December 1989, continuing until February 1990.

The primary phase of the Citizens Committees' activities came to a close when the Congress of Estonia was elected on February 24, 1990, and convened on March 11, 1990. The committees became defunct soon thereafter; most in the spring of 1990, almost all by the end of 1990. County committees were reorganised as departments of the Estonian Committee, founded by the Congress of Estonia, and began issuing identity documents (the so-called Rumessen passports after Vardo Rumessen) to registered citizens.
