= Priit Willbach =

Estonian politician and businessman

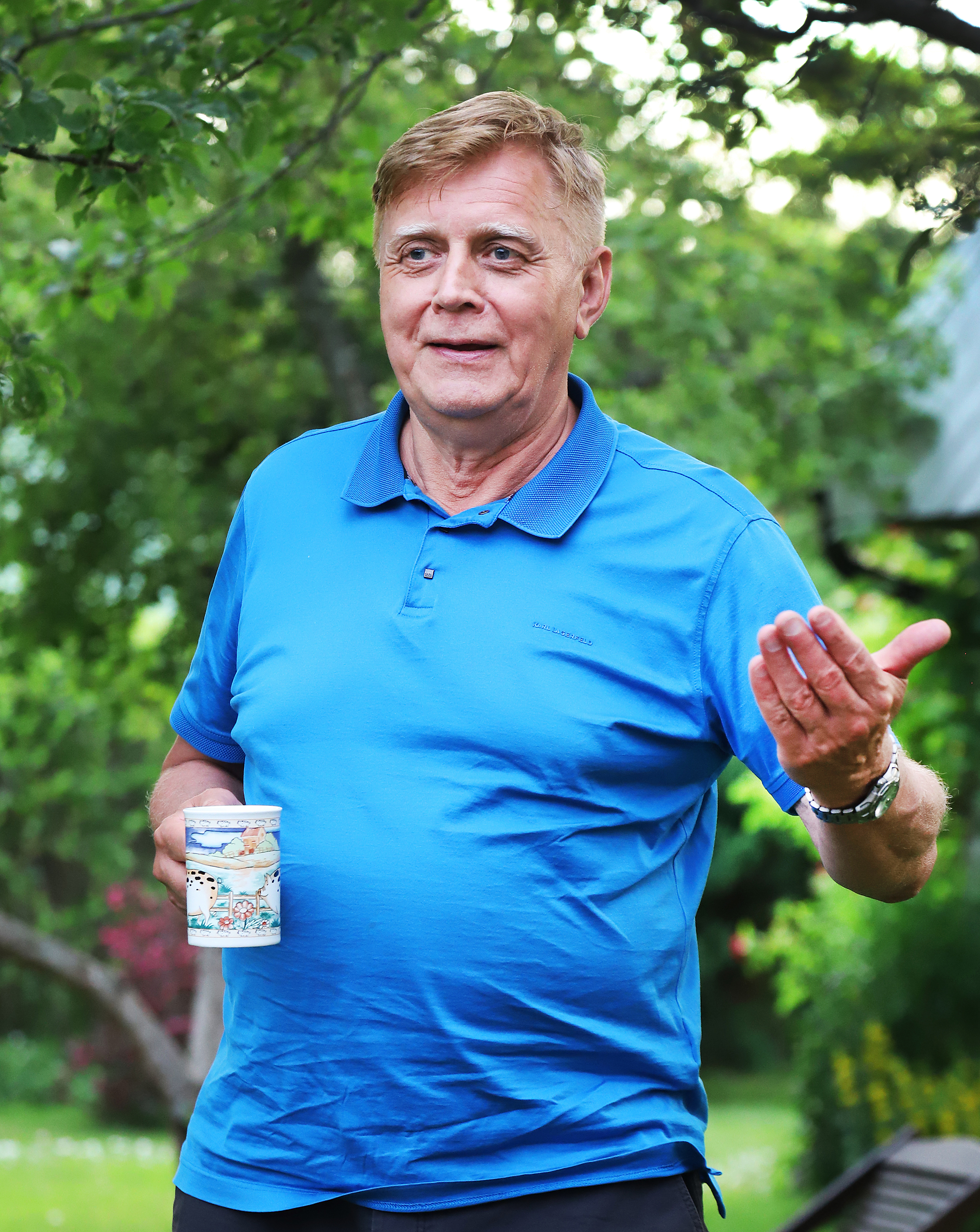
Priit Willbach (2022)

Priit Willbach (born July 22, 1953; until 2013 Priit Vilba) is an Estonian politician and businessman who was mayor of Tallinn for two weeks (October 31 – November 14) in 1996. In 2001, while deputy mayor of Tallinn, Vilba was accused of allocating city contracts to his son.

Political offices
Preceded by Jaak Tamm	Mayor of Tallinn; October 1996 – November 1996	Succeeded by Robert Lepikson
