= Olev Laanjärv =

Estonian lawyer and politician

Olev Laanjärv (born 11 March 1942 in Haapsalu) is an Estonian lawyer and politician.

From 1990 to 1992, he was Minister of the Interior.
