= Alar Laneman =

Estonian politician (born 1962)

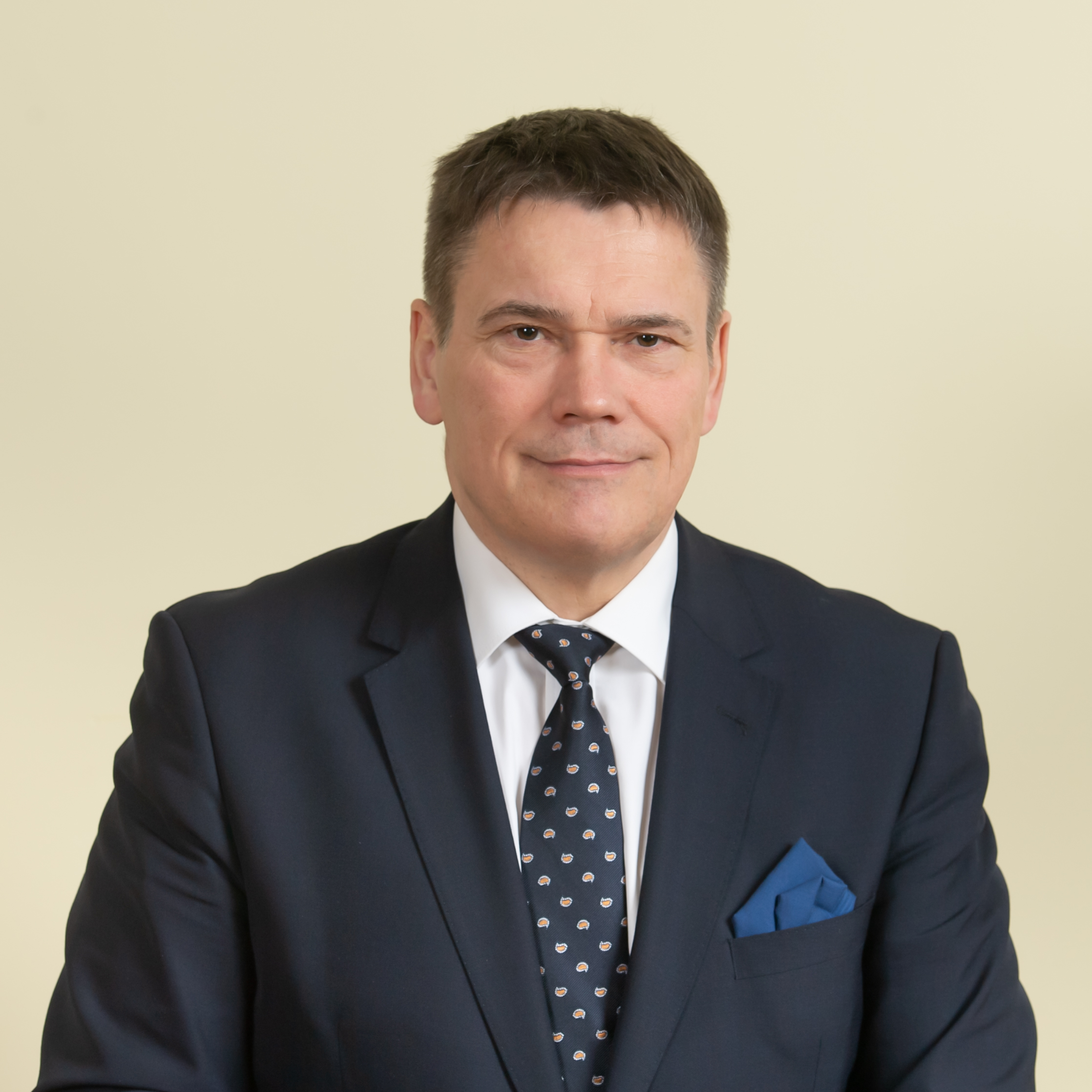

Minister of the Interior
- In office 18 November 2020 – 26 January 2021
- Prime Minister: Jüri Ratas
- Preceded by: Mart Helme
- Succeeded by: Kristian Jaani

Personal details
- Born: 6 May 1962 (age 64) Vändra, then part of Estonian SSR, Soviet Union
- Party: Estonian Reform Party (2024–present)
- Other political affiliations: EKRE (2019–2024)
- Education: Swedish Defence University; Royal College of Defence Studies

Military service
- Allegiance: USSR (1981–1991); Estonia (1991–2009)
- Branch/service: Estonian Land Forces
- Years of service: 1981–2009
- Rank: Brigadier general
- Commands: Headquarters of the Estonian Defence Forces

Alar Laneman (born 6 May 1962) is an Estonian politician and was interior of the Republic of Estonia from 18 November 2020.

Laneman stood as a candidate on the list of the Estonian Conservative People's Party in the 2019 Riigikogu elections in the 12th constituency and was elected with 673 votes.

He served as Minister of the Interior in the second cabinet of Prime Minister Jüri Ratas from 18 November 2020 to 26 January 2021. Kristian Jaani was appointed as his successor.

Laneman was a member of the Conservative People's Party of Estonia (EKRE) from 2019 to 14 June 2024. On 12 July 2024, he joined the liberal Estonian Reform Party.

Political offices
Preceded by Mart Helme	Minister of the Interior; 2020–2021	Succeeded by Kristian Jaani
