= Ivi Eenmaa =

Estonian politician (born 1943)

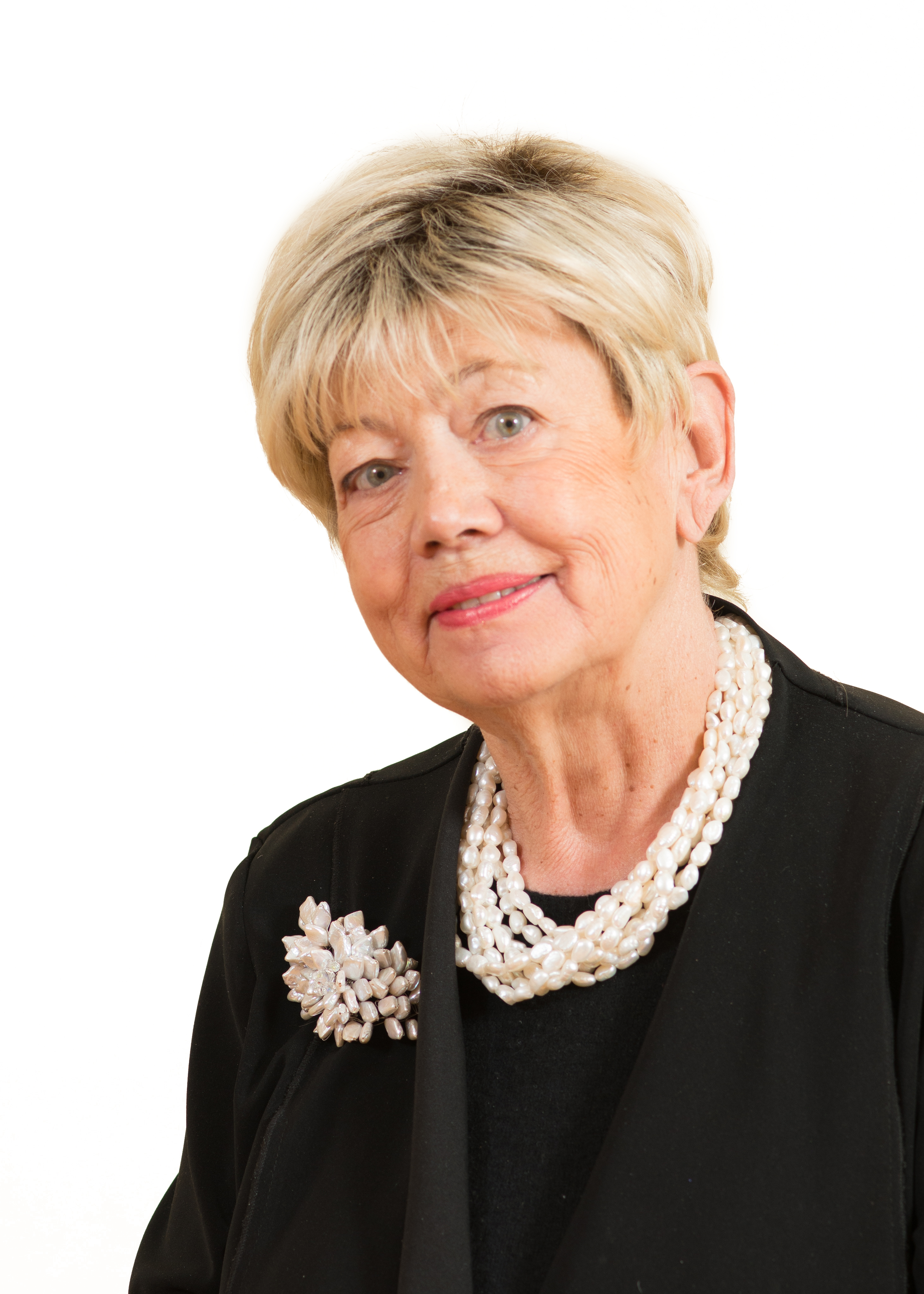
Ivi Eenmaa (2015)

Ivi Eenmaa (born 2 June 1943) is an Estonian politician.

She was the head of the Estonian National Library from 1993 to 1997. After this, she entered politics, becoming a member of the now defunct Estonian Coalition Party. From 15 May 1997 to 25 March 1999, she was the mayor of Tallinn. She was Tallinn's first and to date only woman mayor.

Later, she joined the Estonian Reform Party and became the mayor of Võru in 2005. In 2007 she was elected to the Riigikogu and left this position.

Political offices
Preceded by Robert Lepikson	Mayor of Tallinn; May 1997 – March 1999	Succeeded by Peeter Lepp
