= Lagle Parek =

Estonian politician

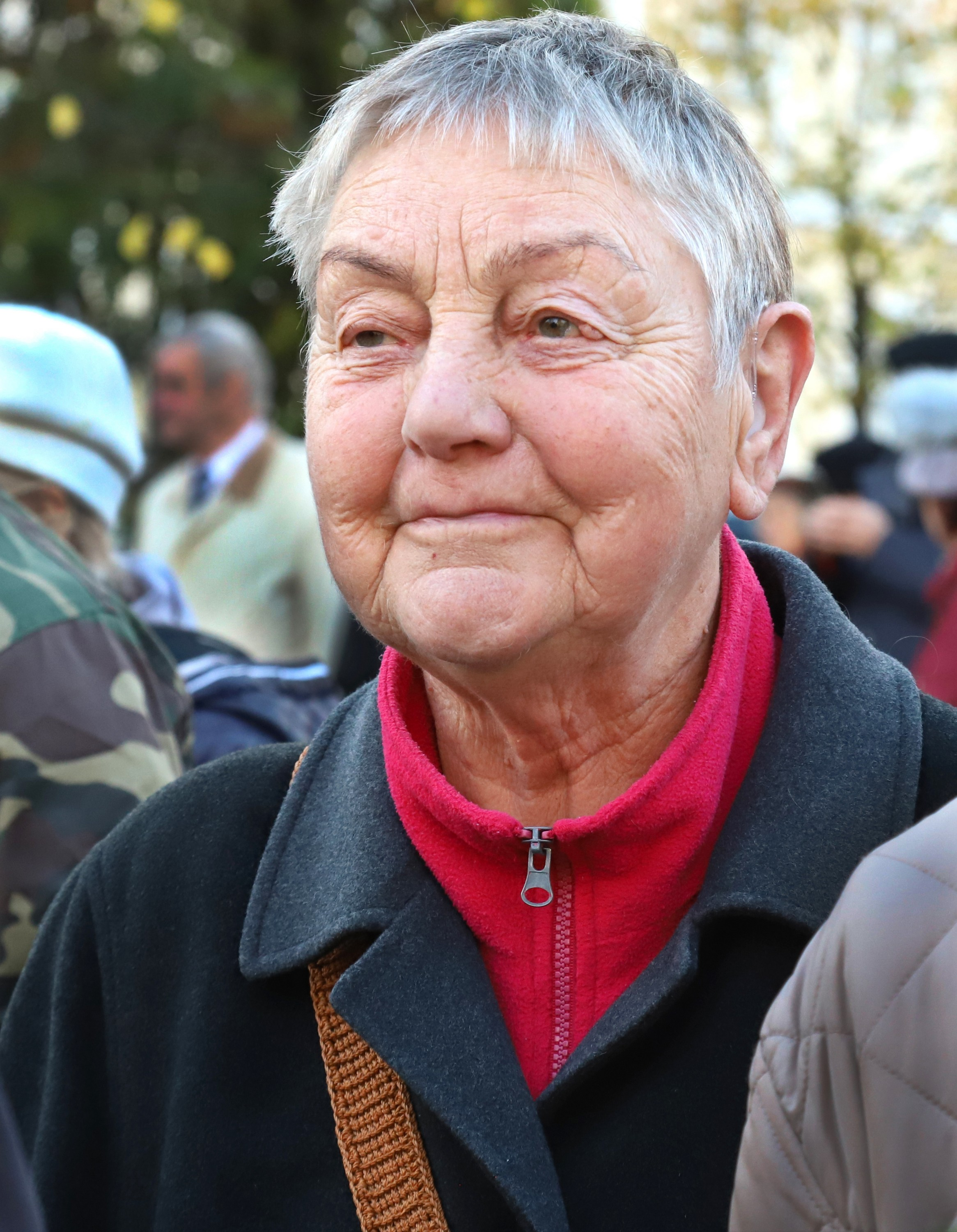
- Parek in 2022

Minister of the Interior
- In office 21 October 1992 – 27 November 1993
- Prime Minister: Mart Laar
- Preceded by: Robert Närska
- Succeeded by: Heiki Arike

Personal details
- Born: 17 April 1941 (age 85) Pärnu, then part of Estonian SSR, Soviet Union

Lagle Parek (born 17 April 1941) is an Estonian politician. She served as the Minister of the Interior in the first post-soviet government, led by the Prime Minister Mart Laar.

== Biography ==
Lagle Parek was born on 17 April 1941 in Pärnu and was the daughter of the former captain of the Military of Estonia Karl Parek (1903–1941) and his wife Elsbeth Parek, a museum director (born in 1902). The father was deported by the Soviet authorities to Leningrad and soon shot. In March 1949, the remainder of his family – Lagle with her mother, older sister, Eva-Marju (born in 1931), and her grandmother, actress Anna Markus (1874–1955) were deported to Siberia (Novosibirsk Oblast) in the Operation Priboi deportation of Baltic inhabitants. Parek's mother was found to have had forbidden books in her museum, and was kept in prison in Siberia until an amnesty in 1953. Parek lived with her grandmother in Siberia and was able to return home after the death of Stalin. She graduated from the Tallinn University of Technology and worked as an architect in the organs of the State Planning Commission, then as a technician and technologist in design institute in Tartu.

== Dissident activities and arrest ==
On 10 October 1981, Parek participated in the signing of an open letter to the heads of government of the USSR and the countries of northern Europe, in which the authors (38 Lithuanians, Latvians and Estonians) supporting the Soviet leadership, approved the Scandinavian Nuclear-weapon-free zone initiative and proposed to extend this initiative to the Baltic states, as well as proposing the removal of Soviet missiles from their territory. Parek also participated in the publication of Samizdat journals, as well as liaising with dissidents in Russia.

On 5 March 1983, Parek was arrested and on 16 December sentenced by the Supreme Court under Article 68 Part 1 of the Criminal Code of the ESSR (corresponds to Art. 70-1 of the Criminal Code of the RSFSR) to 6 years in prison and 3 years of exile. Other defendants in the same case, charged with the same crimes, were Heiki Ahonen (who later became the director of the Museum of Occupations in Tallinn) and Arvo Pesti (both born 1956). Both men received 5 years in prison and 2 years of exile. For a time she served in Dubravlag labor camp in the so-called "small area" for women who have been convicted of political crimes. Along with Tatyana Velikanova, Irina Ratushinskaya and others, Parek took part in the hunger strikes and other protests, for which she was subjected to imprisonment in solitary confinement. In January 1987, Parek was pardoned and released.

== After release ==
After her release, Parek returned to Estonia. In 1988, she was one of the founders of the Estonian National Independence Party (ERSP) and she was its chairman from 1988–1992. From 1990 to 1992 Parek participated in the Congress of Estonia, seen as an "alternative parliament". In 1992, in the first elections to the new Estonian Riigikogu, ERSP received 10 seats (8.8% of the vote) and entered a coalition government. Parek participated in the presidential elections in Estonia on 20 October 1992, taking fourth place with 4.3% of the vote. In the radical pro-reform government of Prime Minister Mart Laar Parek was appointed Minister of the Interior. On 27 November 1993 she resigned because of the Pullapää crisis, which involved charges of mutiny against a company of military rangers.

Parek was a member of the Pro Patria and Res Publica Union party, formed in 1995 through the merger of ERSP and the National Coalition Party along with the "Fatherland" Party, to create the "Isamaaliit" ("Fatherland Union"), and then in 2006, she was a member of the Pro Patria Union and Res Publica Party. She is author of the book «Mina ei tea, kust ma rõõmu võtan. Mälestused »(« I do not know where I get joy. Memories ». Kirjastus Kunst, Tallinn, 2010, 424 pages).

== Conversion to Roman Catholicism ==
In the mid-1990s Lagle Parek adopted Catholicism. She is head of the non-profit association Caritas Eesti, entering the international Catholic charity confederation Caritas Internationalis. In recent years, Lagle Parek has been living in the Pirita Convent in Pirita.

== Pullapää crisis ==
Parek resigned on 27 November 1993 in the aftermath of the Pullapää crisis. Before her, Hain Rebas, the Minister of Defence, had resigned over the same crisis.

== Awards ==
- 1996 – Order of the National Coat of Arms II Art.
- 1998 – Award "Consent» («Koosmeele auhind»), with Andrew Khvostov and Larissa Vasil'chenko
- 2006 – Order of the White Star II Art.
- 2007 – the title of "Citizen of the Year"
- 2009 – Order of Polonia Restituta in Poland

Political offices
Preceded by Robert Närska	Minister of the Interior; 1992–1993	Succeeded by Heiki Arike
