= Kristian Jaani =

Estonian politician (born 1976)

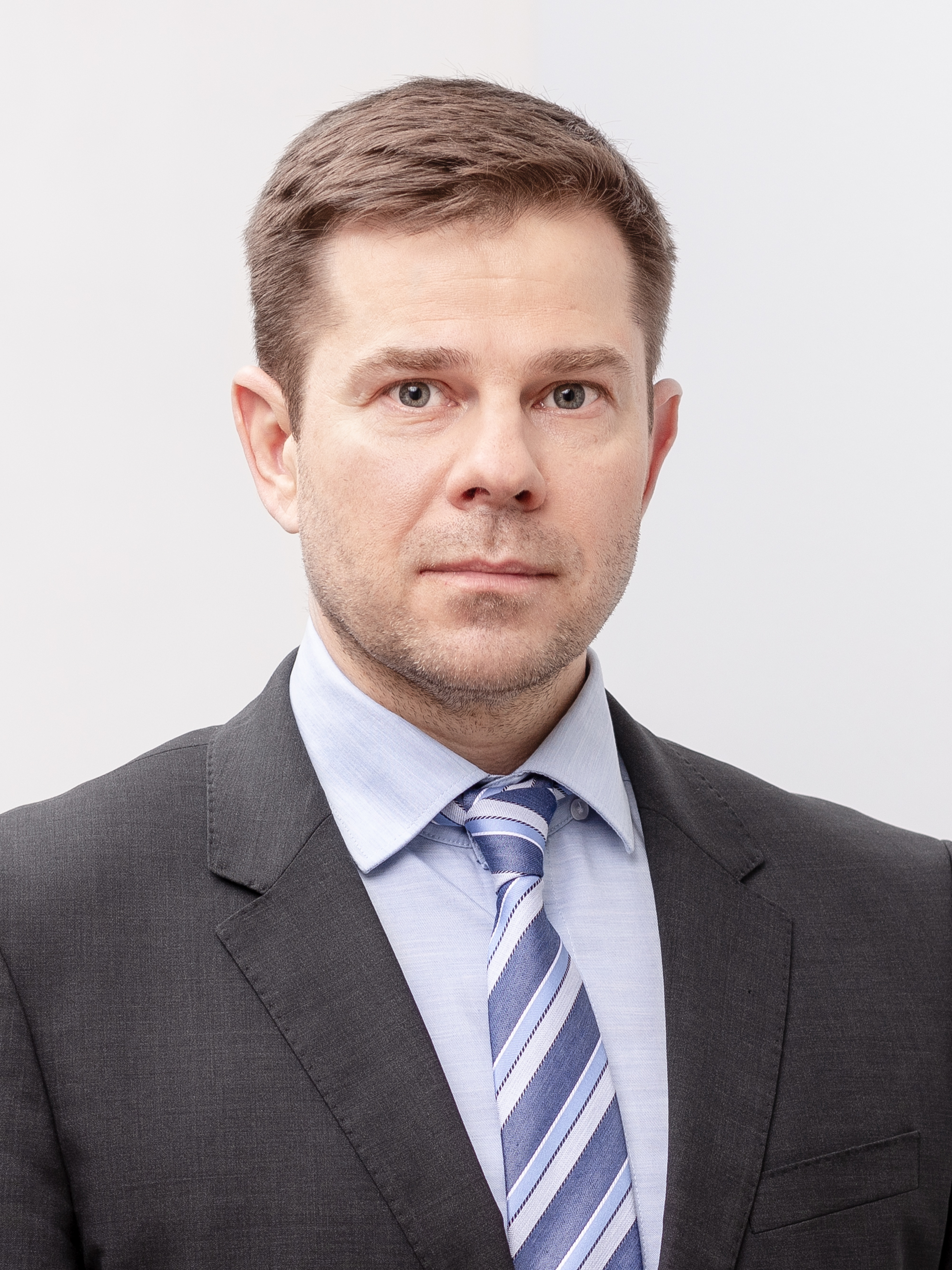

Minister of the Interior
- In office 26 January 2021 – 3 June 2022
- Prime Minister: Kaja Kallas
- Preceded by: Alar Laneman
- Succeeded by: Kalle Laanet (acting)

Personal details
- Born: 11 December 1976 (age 49) Tallinn, then part of Estonian SSR, Soviet Union
- Education: Estonian Academy of Security Sciences

Kristian Jaani (born 11 December 1976) is an Estonian high-ranking police officer and former Minister of the Interior. He served as Minister of the Interior in the cabinet of Prime Minister Kaja Kallas from 2021 to 2022. He was nominated by the Centre Party as an independent in January 2021 and officially joined the party on 9 June 2021 and left the party 22 June 2022.

He graduated with degrees in police and internal security at the Estonian Academy of Security Sciences.

Political offices
Preceded by Alar Laneman	Minister of the Interior; 2021–present	Incumbent
