= Tunne Kelam =

Estonian politician (born 1936)

Tunne-Väldo Kelam MEP
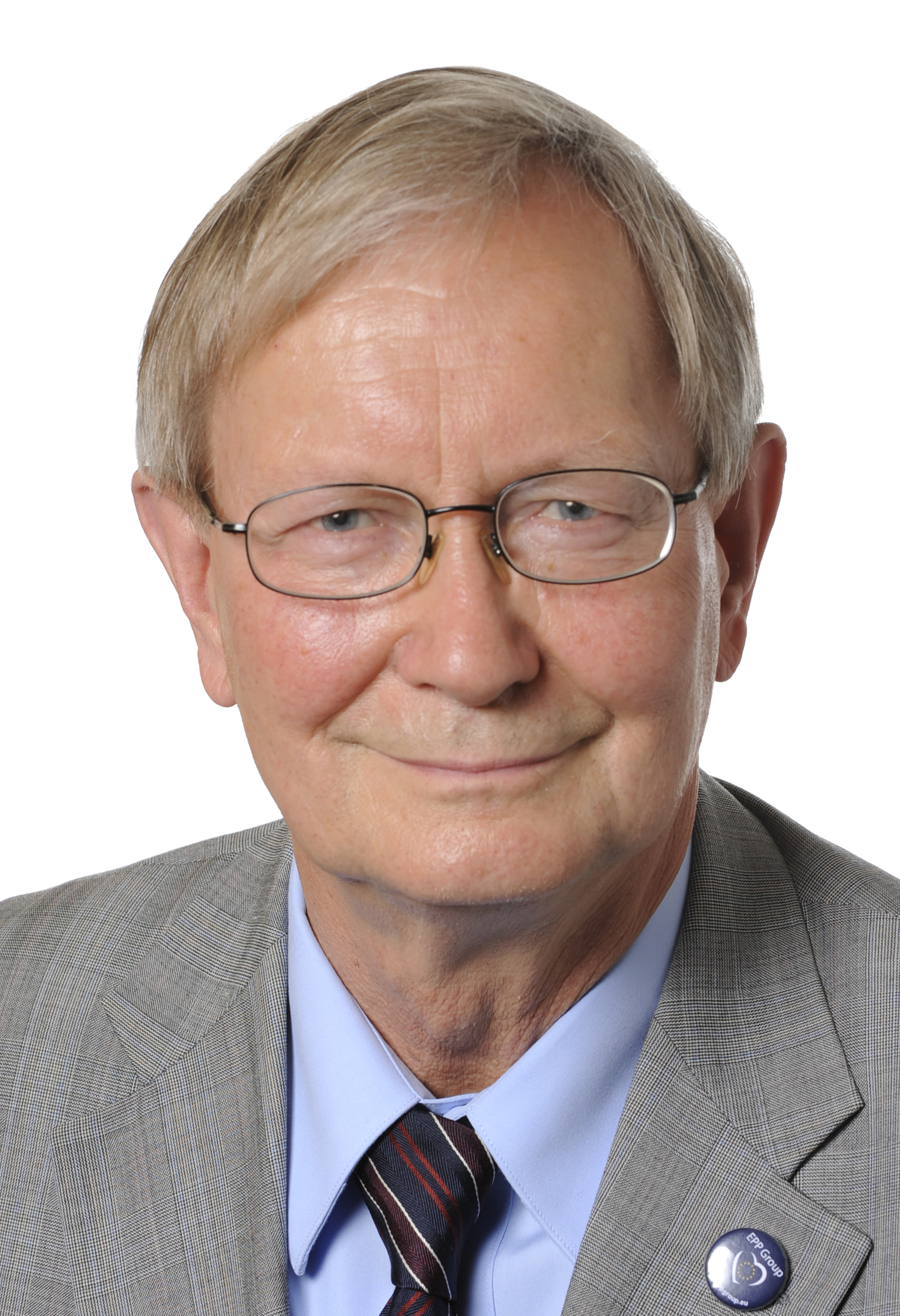

Member of the European Parliament
- In office 13 June 2004 – 30 June 2019
- Constituency: Estonia

Personal details
- Born: Tunne-Väldo Kelam; 10 July 1936 (age 90) Taheva, Estonia
- Party: Estonian; Pro Patria and Res Publica Union; EU; European People's Party
- Spouse: Mari-Ann Kelam
- Children: 1 (from a previous marriage)
- Education: University of Tartu
- Website: www.kelam.ee

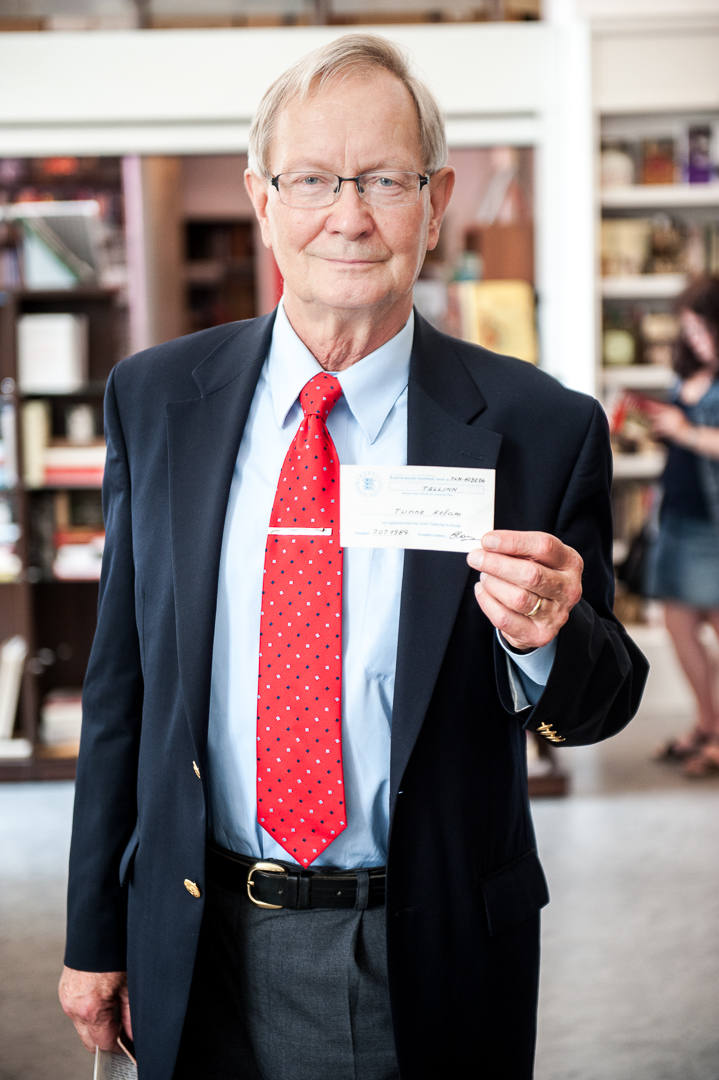
Tunne Kelam at the "Europeana 1989 Collection Day" in June 2013.

Tunne-Väldo Kelam (born 10 July 1936) is an Estonian politician and former Member of the European Parliament (MEP) from Estonia. He is a member of the Pro Patria and Res Publica Union, part of the European People's Party.

== Early life and education ==
After graduating from Tallinn 2. Secondary School in 1954 he studied history in the University of Tartu (1954–1959). He was a senior researcher in the State Central Archives in Tartu (1959–1965) and a senior scientific editor of the Estonian Soviet Encyclopaedia in Tallinn (1965–1975). From 1959 till 1970, as a member of the "Science" society, Kelam was also part-time lecturer and columnist on international relations.

== Resistance to the Soviet occupation ==
In 1972 he prepared a memorandum to the UN on behalf of two underground citizens' groups, which asked for the UN assistance to evacuate the Soviet occupation forces and organize free elections. Smuggled out of the country, the memorandum caused lively interest in the West but resulted also in the wave of KGB repressions at home. Kelam narrowly escaped arrest but lost his job in the Encyclopaedia and all his public activities were suppressed. He stayed for the next dozen years under strict KGB surveillance but continued to operate half-underground, organizing unofficial opposition groups and passing to the West information about human rights violations in the Soviet occupied Estonia. From 1979 till 1987 Kelam was employed as a night-shift worker on a state poultry farm.

== Political activity ==
By the end of the 1980s he had become one of the leading advocates for restoration of independence in Estonian society. In August 1988 Kelam became a founding member of the Estonian National Independence Party (ERSP, Eesti Rahvusliku Sõltumatuse Partei), the first non-Communist political party on the territory of the Soviet Union. In 1989 he emerged as one of the leaders of the Estonian Citizens' Committees Movement - a massive citizens' initiative in support of restoration of the independent nation state. In February 1990 Kelam was elected to the Congress of Estonia - a transition time representative body of Estonian citizens, which aspired for full-fledged independent statehood on the basis of the legal continuity of the Republic of Estonia. From 1990 to 1992 Kelam served as chairman of the Estonian Committee, an executive body of the Congress of Estonia. In August 1991 he was instrumental in achieving a national understanding with the Soviet Estonia's Supreme Council on the principles of restoring Estonian statehood.

Kelam was member of the Constitutional Assembly (1991–1992) and was elected to the first constitutional parliament, the Riigikogu, in 1992, where he served until 2004. He was a Vice Speaker of Riigikogu (1992–2003) and chairman of the European Affairs Committee (1997–2003).

As the last chairman of the conservative Estonian National Independence Party (1993–1995), Kelam led his party into merger with the National Coalition Party Pro Patria (1995), which resulted in creation of the centre-right Pro Patria Union. He succeeded Mart Laar as its chairman (2002–2005). In 2002–2003 he represented the Riigikogu in the Convention on the Future of Europe. He was elected to the membership of the European Parliament in 2004, in 2009 and in 2014.

He is also a board member of the Human Rights Institute (since 1997), the Kistler-Ritso Foundation (since 1998) which built the Museum of Occupations in Tallinn and was chief elder of the Estonian Scouting Association (1996–2007).

Kelam is a founding signatory of the Prague Declaration on European Conscience and Communism. (2008) and is one of the initiators of the European Parliament's resolution on European Conscience and Totalitarianism (2009). He also initiated the publication of the book "Reunification of Europe" (2009) which presents the 20th century experiences of ten post-Communist EU member states.

== Decorations ==
Tunne Kelam has been decorated with the Estonian Order of the Coat of Arms, 1st class (2005), with the French Grand Officier de l'Ordre National du Merité (2001), with Robert Schuman medal and honorary diploma (2006), with the Baltic Parliamentary Assembly's Diploma and the Sash of Honour for the outstanding contribution to the restoration of independence (1999), with Rotary International Paul Harris award (1990) etc. He is honorary citizen of the State of Maryland (1991).

== Personal life ==
Tunne Kelam is married to Mari-Ann Kelam, a politician and former press spokesman of the Ministry of Foreign Affairs. He has a daughter from a previous marriage. Tunne Kelam's brother was composer Kuldar Sink.

Tunne Kelam has also written two books.
