= Peeter Lepp =

Estonian politician

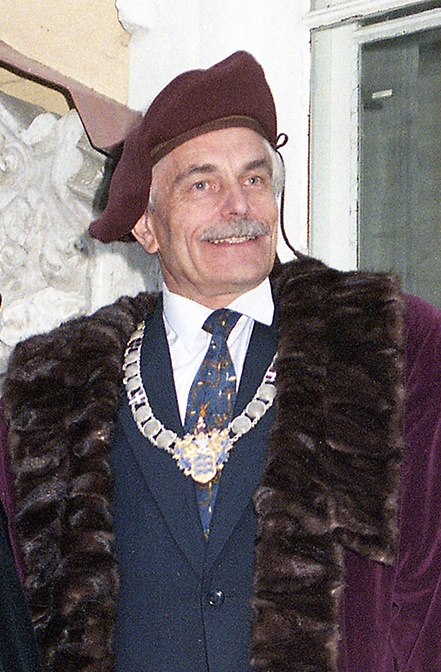
Peeter Lepp at Tallinn Old Town Days in 1999

Peeter Lepp (born 1 July 1943) is an Estonian politician. From 1993 to 2002, he was a member of the Estonian Coalition Party. After its dissolution, he joined the Estonian Reform Party.

He was a member of the Tallinn town council from 1996 to 1999 and was the head of Põhja-Tallinn (north Tallinn) district. He was the mayor of Tallinn for 7 months, from 25 March to 5 November 1999.

Political offices
Preceded by Ivi Eenmaa	Mayor of Tallinn; March 1999 – November 1999	Succeeded by Jüri Mõis
