= Vardo Rumessen =

Estonian pianist, musicologist and politician

Vardo Rumessen (8 August 1942 – 24 August 2015) was an Estonian pianist, musicologist and politician for the Union of Pro Patria and Res Publica. He is best known for his work with Eduard Tubin's music. He was born in Pärnu. In his performances abroad, he played works by Estonian composed that were forbidden under the Soviet regime.

== Political activity ==
Rumessen's political activity centered on restoring Estonia's independence, and he was a member in the following organisations:

- 1989: Estonian Citizens' Committees' Provisional Communications Department;
- 1989–1995: Estonian National Independence Party;
- 1990: Congress of Estonia;
- 1990–1992: board member of the Estonian Committee;
- 1992: Estonian Constitutional Assembly (Estonian: Põhiseaduse Assamblee);
- From the year 1995 member of the Pro Patria Union;
- Throughout 1992–1995 and 1999–2003 member of Riigikogu.
