= Robert Närska =

Estonian economist and politician

Robert Närska (born 21 September 1948 in Tartu) is an Estonian economist and politician.

In 1992, he was Minister of the Interior. In 2007, he was suspected in the Werol case.
