= Koit Pikaro =

Estonian politician (1949–2026)

Koit Pikaro (13 August 1949 – 7 February 2026) was an Estonian politician. He was a member of the IX Riigikogu and X Riigikogu.

== Biography ==
Pikaro was a member of Estonian Centre Party. He died on 7 February 2026, at the age of 76.

He worked as an criminal police officer and investigator from 1971 to 1996 in Estonian Soviet Socialist Republic and in Republic of Estonia. From 1994 to 1996, he was the Deputy Director of the Central Criminal Police in Estonian Police.

During his time in Police, Koit Pikaro became well known to the press and as a result, acquired reputation of being hard and non-compromising law enforcement officer. As an officer, he was involved in events of Pullapää crisis that received great deal of media attention. His time in police is remembered in mixed views as in mainstream he became legendary policeman but based on many memoirs and also later writings inspired by his actions such as the book Punane elavhõbe, show him in more colorful character who did not shy away bending the law when needed.

There are many articles of him, interviews and even film "Tallinna Võmm" made in 1995, by tv crew from Germany. During the filming, there was a raid to top level brothel called Lily in Tallinn. During this raid, conducted right in front of cameras, they found in brothel a client Toomas Saks, serving 1993–1998 as the director of state owned company called RE Eesti Kütus. He's legacy was also serving as an example in for one of the main characters in novel Punane elavhõbe, published 2007 and made into a film in 2010. His character was portrayed by an actor Peeter Oja.
