= Tarmo Loodus =

Estonian politician

Tarmo Loodus (born 18 February 1958 in Lihula) is an Estonian educator and politician.

In 1996, he was elected mayor of Viljandi. From 1999 to 2002, he was Minister of the Interior.
