= Jüri Toomepuu =

Estonian journalist and politician

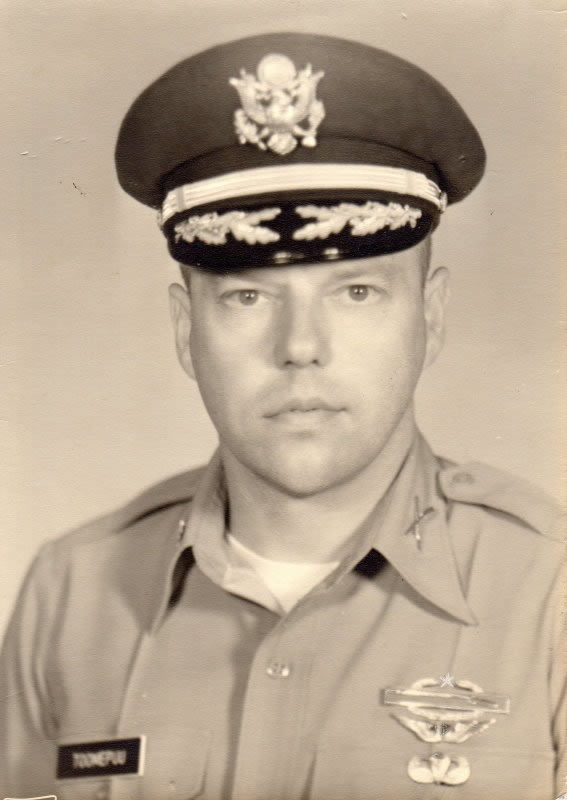

Jüri Toomepuu (born 27 June 1930, in Tõlliste Parish, Valga County) is an Estonian journalist and politician. He was a member of the seventh legislature of the Estonian Parliament.

== Biography ==
He was born on 27 June 1930 in Tõlliste Parish, Valga County. His father Juhan Toomepuu (1902–1990) fought as a 16-year-old volunteer in the Estonian War of Independence and was an officer in the Estonian Navy. Toomepuu studied in Viljandi, Nõmme and Tallinn schools from 1937 until 1943. In 1943, the family fled to Sweden, then to the United States. He studied at the City College of New York University and the University of Alaska, graduating from the University of Southern California with a master's degree in systems management.

He joined the United States Army at the age of 20 to fight in the Korean War as an infantryman. After two years of active duty, he joined the reserves, and under a special act of the United States he was granted American citizenship and promoted to an officer rank, after which he reentered active duty as a second lieutenant in 1957. As part of the 1st Cavalry Division, he served during the Vietnam War and was awarded the Distinguished Service Cross. He later worked as a helicopter pilot and flight instructor in New York. He retired after being Chief of Research and Studies of the United States Army Recruiting Command.

Before the Estonian Restoration of Independence, he served as Minister of War of the Estonian government-in-exile. He played a great role in helping restore the Estonian Defense League. In the 1992 Estonian parliamentary election, Toomepuu collected 4.6% of all votes counted.

== Personal life ==
Jüri Toomepuu is the elder brother of the former chairman of the Estonian Society of Central Florida, retired Army Colonel Tõnu Toomepuu. He married Astrid Oie Tarem (1929–1999) in 1954; they divorced in 1959. His son Aldo is also a soldier, who served in the Iraq War as part of the 1st Infantry Division. He currently lives near Tampa, Florida.
