= Nõmme, Haapsalu =

Village in Estonia

Coordinates: 58°55′49″N 23°27′19″E

Nõmme
- Village
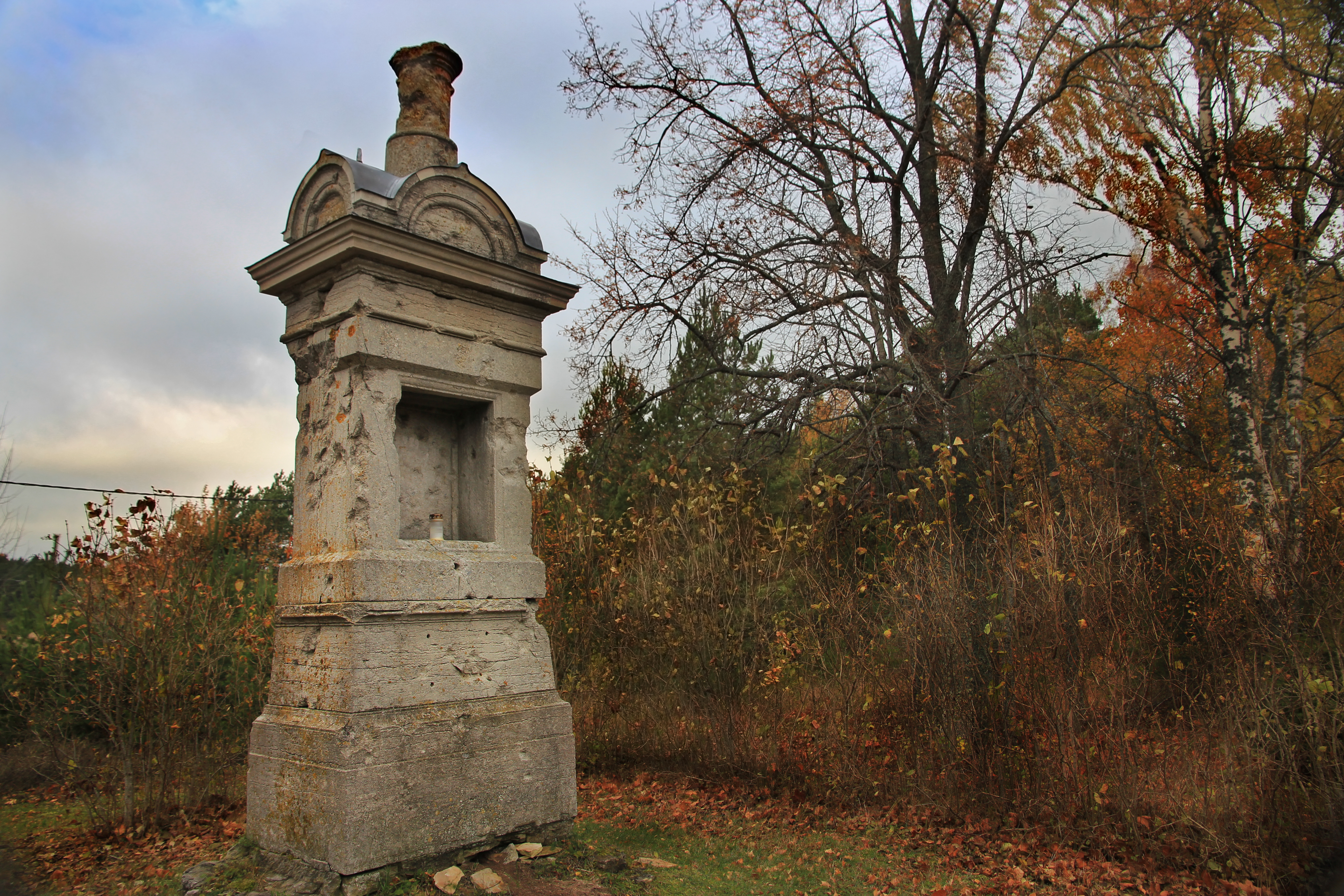
- Monument dedicated to Alexander III of Russia in Pullapää, part of the village of Nõmme
- Interactive map of Nõmme
- Country: Estonia
- County: Lääne County
- Municipality: Haapsalu
- Time zone: UTC+2 (EET)
  - Summer (DST): UTC+3 (EEST)

Nõmme is a village in Haapsalu municipality, Lääne County, in western Estonia.

Prior to the 2017 administrative reform of local governments, Nõmme was located in Ridala Parish. The village of Nõmme comprises the territory of former village of Pullapää.

== Name ==
Nõmme was attested in historical sources as Немекюла in 1913. The name comes from the common noun nõmm (genitive: nõmme) 'heath, moor, moorland', referring to the local geography.

== Description ==
Nõmme, Haapsalu is a small village with a very low population and has a warm climate with statues scattered in prominent places.

== See also ==
- Pullapää crisis
