= Nõmme, Hiiumaa Parish =

Village in Estonia

Nõmme
- Village
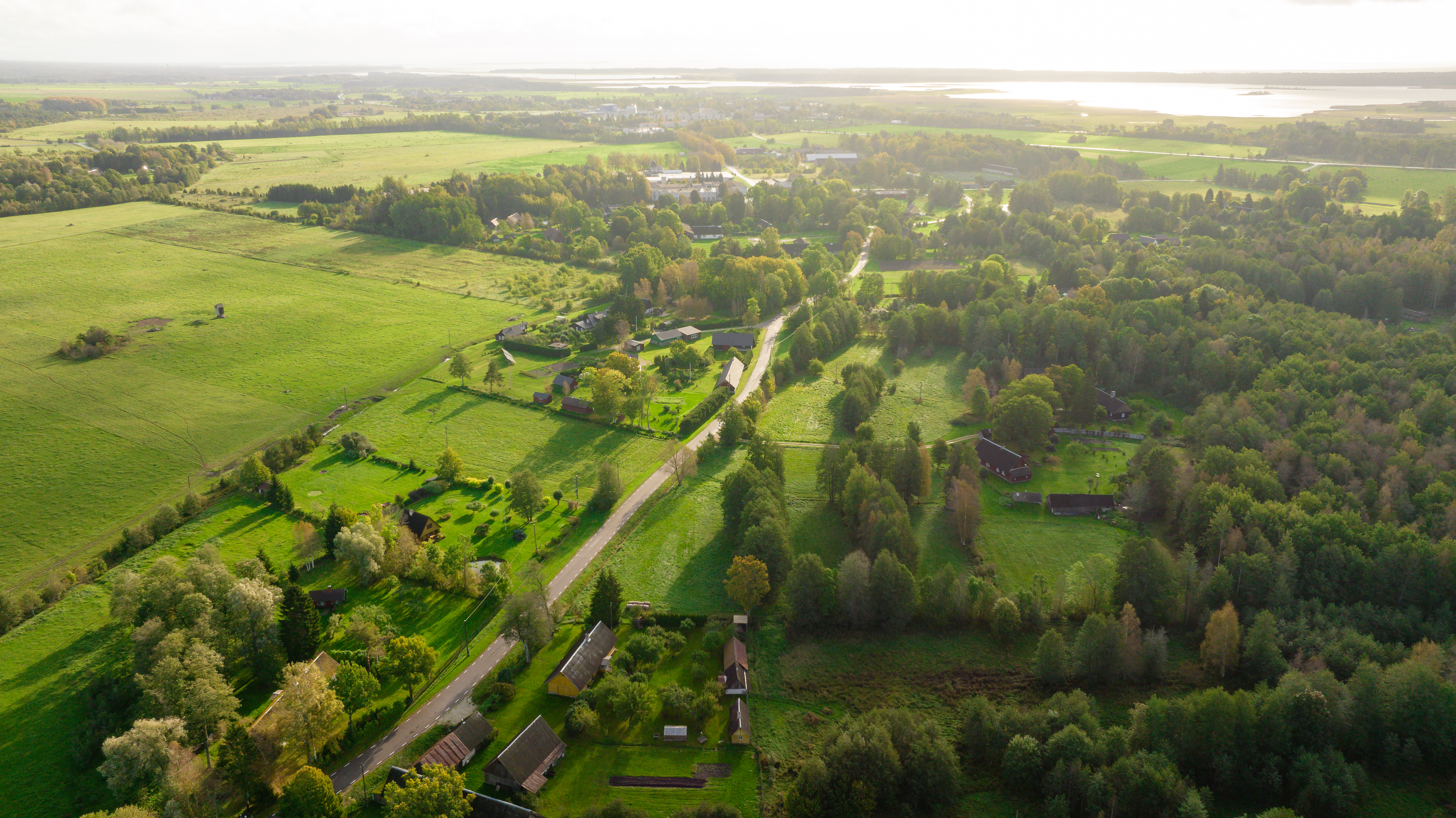
- A drone image of Nõmme

- Location within Estonia
- Coordinates: 58°50′05″N 22°44′41″E
- Country: Estonia
- County: Hiiu County
- Parish: Hiiumaa Parish
- Time zone: UTC+2 (EET)
  - Summer (DST): UTC+3 (EEST)

Nõmme is a village in Hiiumaa Parish, Hiiu County in northwestern Estonia.

== Name ==
Nõmme was attested in historical sources as Neme in 1611 and Nemmekülla in 1782. The name comes from the common noun nõmm (genitive: nõmme) 'heath, moor, moorland', referring to the local geography.
