= Hain Rebas =

Estonian historian and politician (born 1943)

Hain Rebas (born 23 January 1943 in Tallinn) is an Estonian historian and politician.

From 1992 to 1993, he was Minister of Defence.
