= Ministry of the Interior (Estonia) =

Government ministry of Estonia

Agency overview
- Formed: 24 February 1918; 108 years ago (first establishment); 20 August 1991; 35 years ago (agency restored)
- Dissolved: 1940–1991
- Jurisdiction: Government of Estonia
- Headquarters: Pikk 61 Tallinn, Estonia
- Annual budget: €464 million (2022)
- Minister responsible: Igor Taro, Minister of Interior
- Child agencies: Police and Border Guard Board; Estonian Rescue Board; Estonian Internal Security Service; Estonian Academy of Security Sciences; Estonian Emergency Response Centre; IT and Development Centre; National Foundation of Civil Society
- Website: https://www.siseministeerium.ee/en/

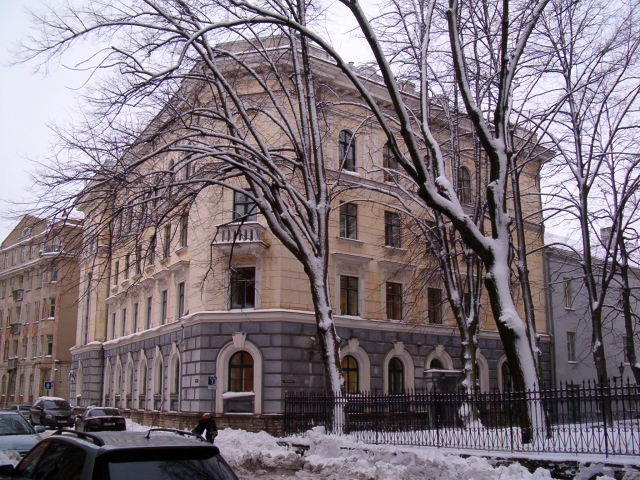
The Ministry of Internal Affairs building in the old town of Tallinn.

The Ministry of the Interior of Estonia (Estonian: Eesti Siseministeerium) is a Ministry in the Estonian Government first established in 1918, before being restored in 1991. The current Minister of the Interior is Igor Taro.

In 2018, Estonia’s ministry of interior planned to introduce the world’s first digital nomad visa in accordance to celebrating its 100 years of independence. The purpose of this visa is to allow non-Estonians access to Estonian services from abroad. This is an addition to groundbreaking initiatives like e-residency and border-less banking which has listed the country as one of the most digitally advanced nations of the decade.

== List of ministers ==
List of ministers of internal affairs since 1990:

- Olev Laanjärv (17 April 1990 – 30 January 1992)
- Robert Närska (30 January 1992 – 21 October 1992)
- Lagle Parek (21 October 1992 – 27 November 1993)
- Heiki Arike (14 December 1993 – 4 November 1994)
- Kaido Kama (4 November 1994 – 12 April 1995)
- Edgar Savisaar (12 April 1995 – 10 October 1995)
- Märt Rask (3 November 1995 – 1 December 1996)
- Riivo Sinijärv (1 December 1996 – 29 April 1997)
- Robert Lepikson (5 May 1997 – 28 January 1998)
- Olari Taal (29 January 1998 – 25 March 1999)
- Jüri Mõis (25 March 1999 – 5 November 1999)
- Tarmo Loodus (9 November 1999 – 28 January 2002)
- Ain Seppik (28 January 2002 – 3 February 2003)
- Toomas Varek (10 February 2003 – 10 April 2003)
- Margus Leivo (10 April 2003 – 13 April 2005)
- Kalle Laanet (13 April 2005 – 5 April 2007)
- Jüri Pihl (5 April 2007 – 21 May 2009)
- Marko Pomerants (3 July 2009 – 5 April 2011)
- Ken-Marti Vaher (6 April 2011 – 26 March 2014)
- Hanno Pevkur (26 March 2014 – 23 November 2016)
- Andres Anvelt (23 November 2016 – 26 November 2018)
- Katri Raik (26 November 2018 – 29 April 2019)
- Mart Helme (29 April 2019 – 9 November 2020)
- Alar Laneman (18 November 2020 – 26 January 2021)
- Kristian Jaani (26 January 2021 – 3 June 2022)
- Kalle Laanet (3 June 2022 – 14 July 2022)
- Lauri Läänemets (18 July 2022 – 11 March 2025)
- Igor Taro (25 March 2025 – present)
