= Olari Taal =

Estonian businessman and politician

Olari Taal (born 7 August 1953) is an Estonian businessman and politician.

He was born in Valga, Estonia.

In 1971, he graduated from Varstu Secondary School (Estonian: Varstu Keskkool). In 1976, he graduated from the Tallinn University of Technology as a civil engineer.

From January 30 ― June 15, 1995, he served as the Ministry of Economic Affairs and Communications under Tiit Vähi. From January 28, 1998 ― March 25, 1999, he served as the Ministry of the Interior of Estonia under Mart Siimann.

Since October 2008, he has been on the Supervisory Board of AS Merko Ehitus.

In 2018, he was one of the founders of Riigireformi SA.

== Acknowledgments ==
- 1996 ― Aasta ärimees ('businessman of the year')
- 1996 ― Aasta ärijuht ('business leader of the year')
- 1998 ― Pressivaenlane ('press enemy')
