= Mart Laar =

Estonian politician and historian (born 1960)

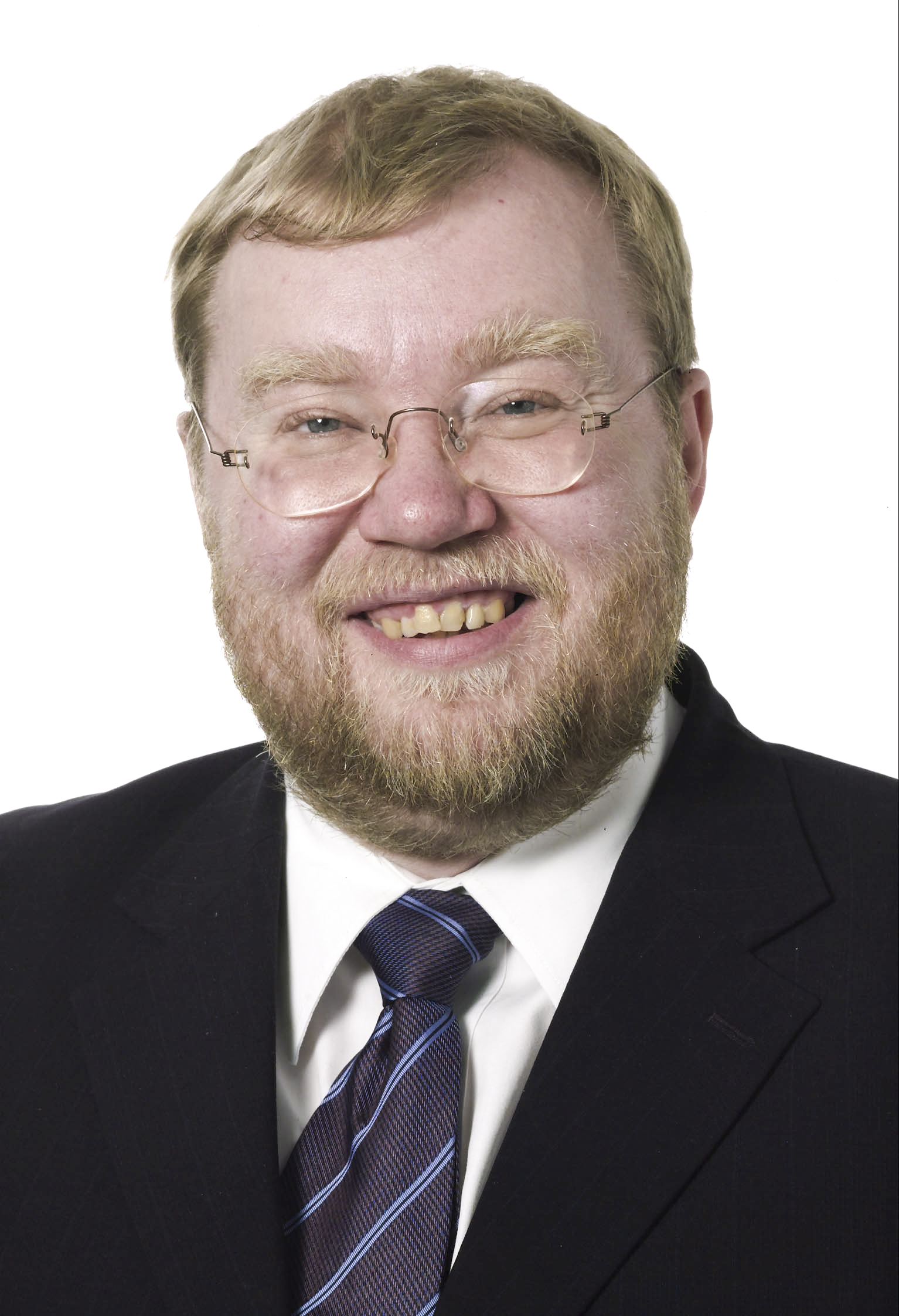
- Laar in 2003

Prime Minister of Estonia
- In office 25 March 1999 – 28 January 2002
- President: Lennart Meri; Arnold Rüütel
- Preceded by: Mart Siimann
- Succeeded by: Siim Kallas
- In office 21 October 1992 – 8 November 1994
- President: Lennart Meri
- Preceded by: Tiit Vähi (acting)
- Succeeded by: Andres Tarand

Minister of Defence
- In office 6 April 2011 – 11 May 2012
- Prime Minister: Andrus Ansip
- Preceded by: Jaak Aaviksoo
- Succeeded by: Urmas Reinsalu

Leader of the Isamaa
- In office 26 May 2007 – 28 January 2012
- Succeeded by: Urmas Reinsalu

Personal details
- Born: 22 April 1960 (age 66) Viljandi, then part of Estonian SSR, Soviet Union
- Party: Pro Patria
- Education: University of Tartu

Mart Laar (born 22 April 1960) is an Estonian politician and historian. He served as the Prime Minister of Estonia from 1992 to 1994 and from 1999 to 2002. Laar is credited with having helped bring about Estonia's rapid economic development during the 1990s. He is a member of the centre-right Isamaa party.

In April 2011, Mart Laar became Minister of Defence in the cabinet of Prime Minister Andrus Ansip and served until his resignation for reasons of health in May 2012.

In April 2013, Riigikogu appointed Laar as chairman of the supervisory board of the Bank of Estonia, his term beginning on 12 June 2013.

== Career ==
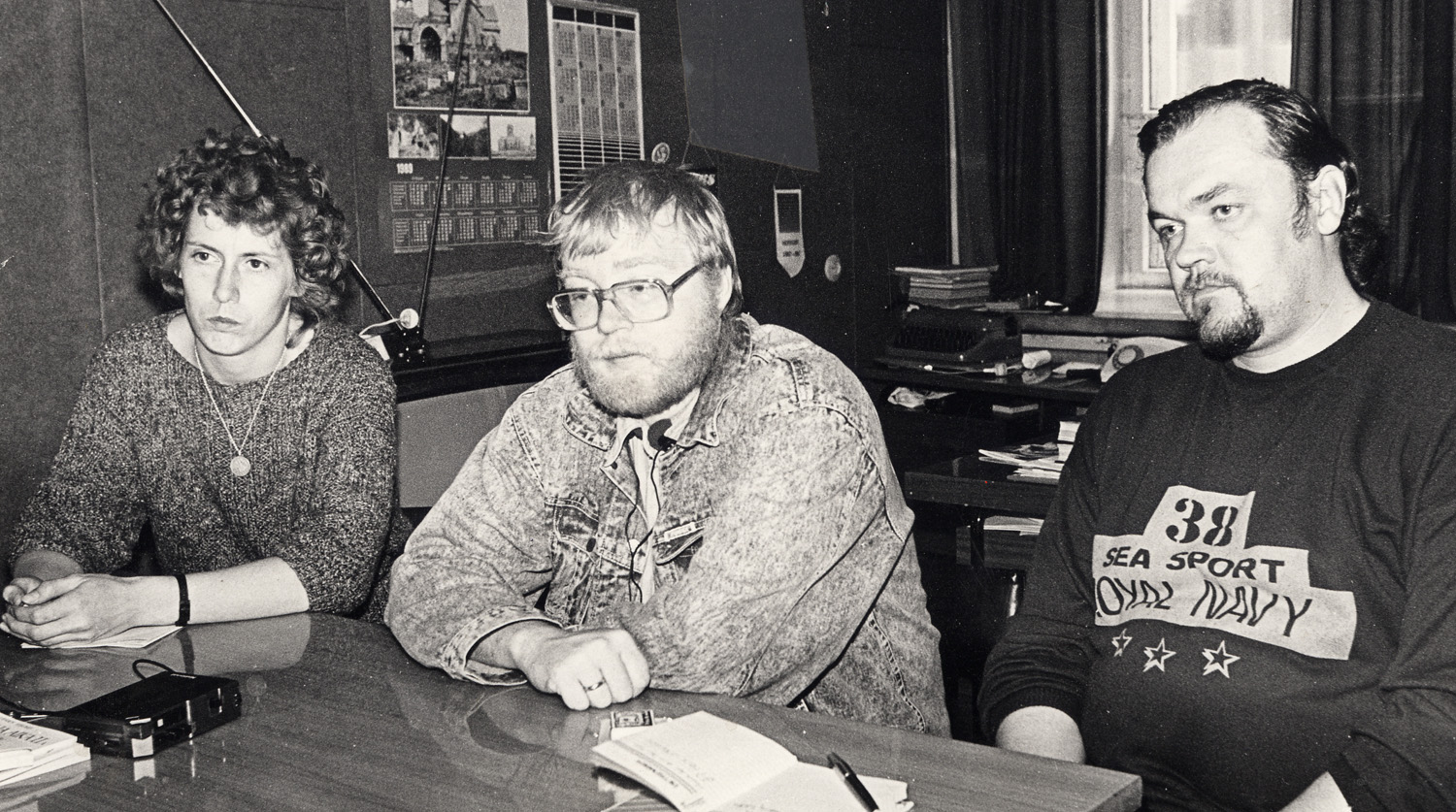
Laar (center) with Kärt Jänes (left) and Hannes Walter (right) at a discussion of ENE at Horisont magazine's headquarters in 1989.

Mart Laar was born in Viljandi. He studied history at the University of Tartu, graduating in 1983; he received his master's degree in philosophy and his doctorate in history in 2005. Laar taught history in Tallinn, and served as president of the Council of Historians of the Foundation of the Estonia Inheritance, the Society for the Preservation of Estonian History, and the Estonian Students' Society. Laar has written many books on Estonian and Soviet history, among them War in the Woods: Estonia's Struggle for Survival, 1944–1956, a book about the Forest Brothers anti-Soviet resistance movement.

Laar's political career began when he became a member of the conservative Pro Patria Union party (which later merged with the more technocratic Res Publica Party in 2006). He was elected prime minister by the Riigikogu on 21 October 1992.

In barely two years, from 1992 to 1994, the radical reforming Estonian government of Mart Laar was the first in Europe to introduce the flat tax, privatized most national industry in transparent public tenders, abolished tariffs and subsidies, stabilized the economy and balanced the budget.

Due to several scandals, Laar was defeated in 1994 by no-confidence vote, when some members of the coalition withdrew their support. Reasons for the vote were publicized details of arms deal with Israel and so called "rouble scandal" - the sale of 2.3 billion Rbls, withdrawn from circulation during the Estonian monetary reform of 1992, to breakaway Chechen Republic of Ichkeria, carried out by Laar's associates at an Estonian private company, Maag, without consulting Parliament.

Five years later, in 1999, Laar returned to the post, with his main policy goals being to pull the economy out of a slump and lead the country toward the European Union. He remained in the post until he stepped down in 2002.

On 18 May 1999 while prime minister, Mart Laar with security advisor Jaan Tross, Võru County head Robert Lepikson and Government Office coordination director Eerik-Niiles Kross used a shotgun to shoot at a photo of Edgar Savisaar, leader of opposition party Keskerakond. Later he explained that during shooting he acted as a private person, not as the prime minister. Mart Laar apologized for this event as Prime Minister and army officer.

== Recognition ==
Laar has multiple Orders from Estonia and other countries.

The results of the radical reforms have been recognized by Cato Institute, which awarded Laar the Cato Institute's Milton Friedman Prize for Advancing Liberty in 2006.

The Acton Institute awarded Laar their Faith & Freedom Award on 24 October 2007.

Laar is member of Honorary Board of the European Association of History Educators (EUROCLIO). He is also a member of the international advisory council of the Victims of Communism Memorial Foundation.

The House of Terror Museum in Hungary awarded Laar the Petőfi Prize in 2011 for his contributions to investigating the crimes of communism.

== Recent activities ==
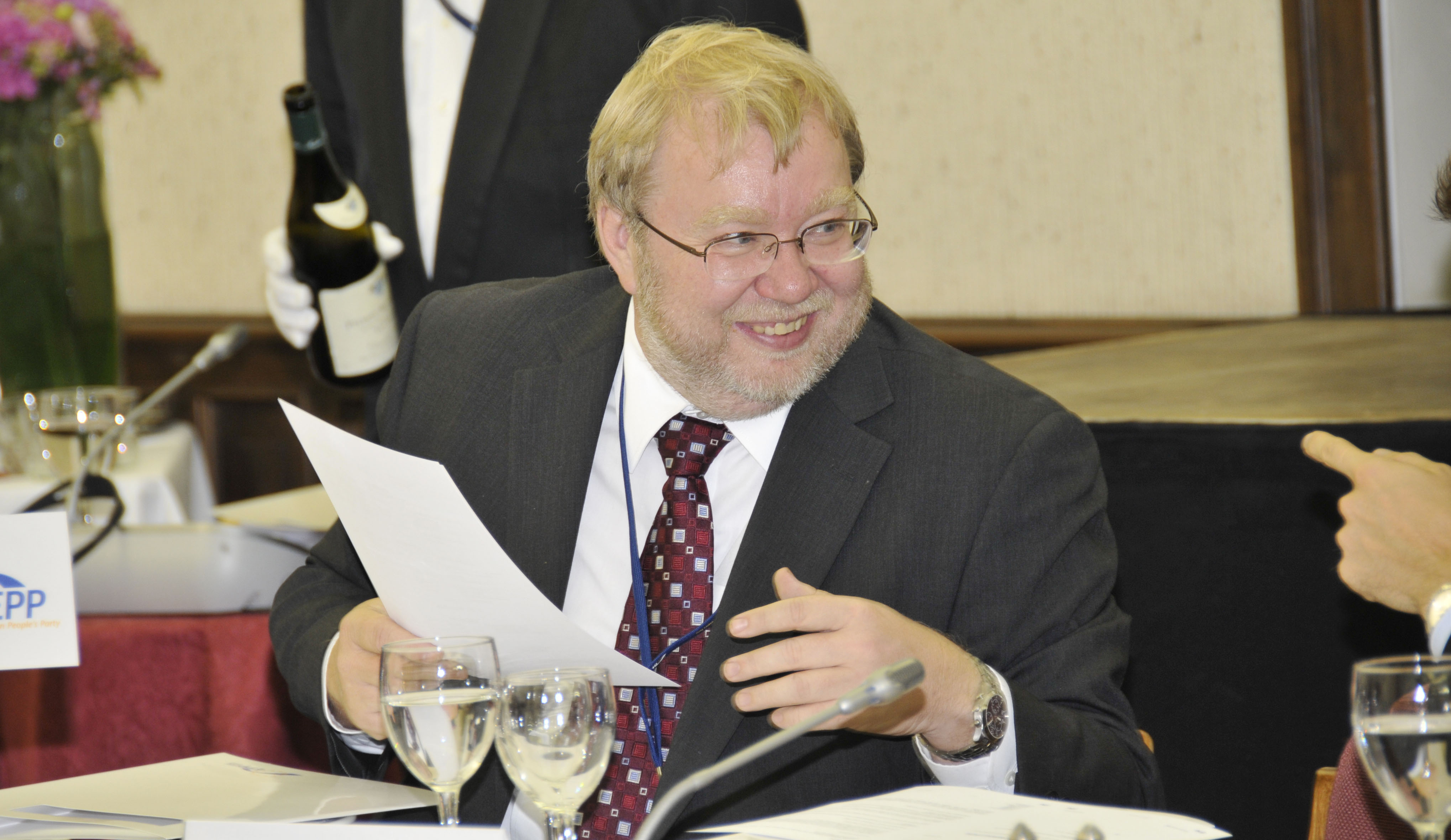
Laar during an EPP summit in September 2010

Together with Václav Havel, Filip Dimitrov, Árpád Göncz, Petr Pithart, Vytautas Landsbergis, Patricio Aylwin and other transition leaders, he participates in the International Committee for Democracy in Cuba.

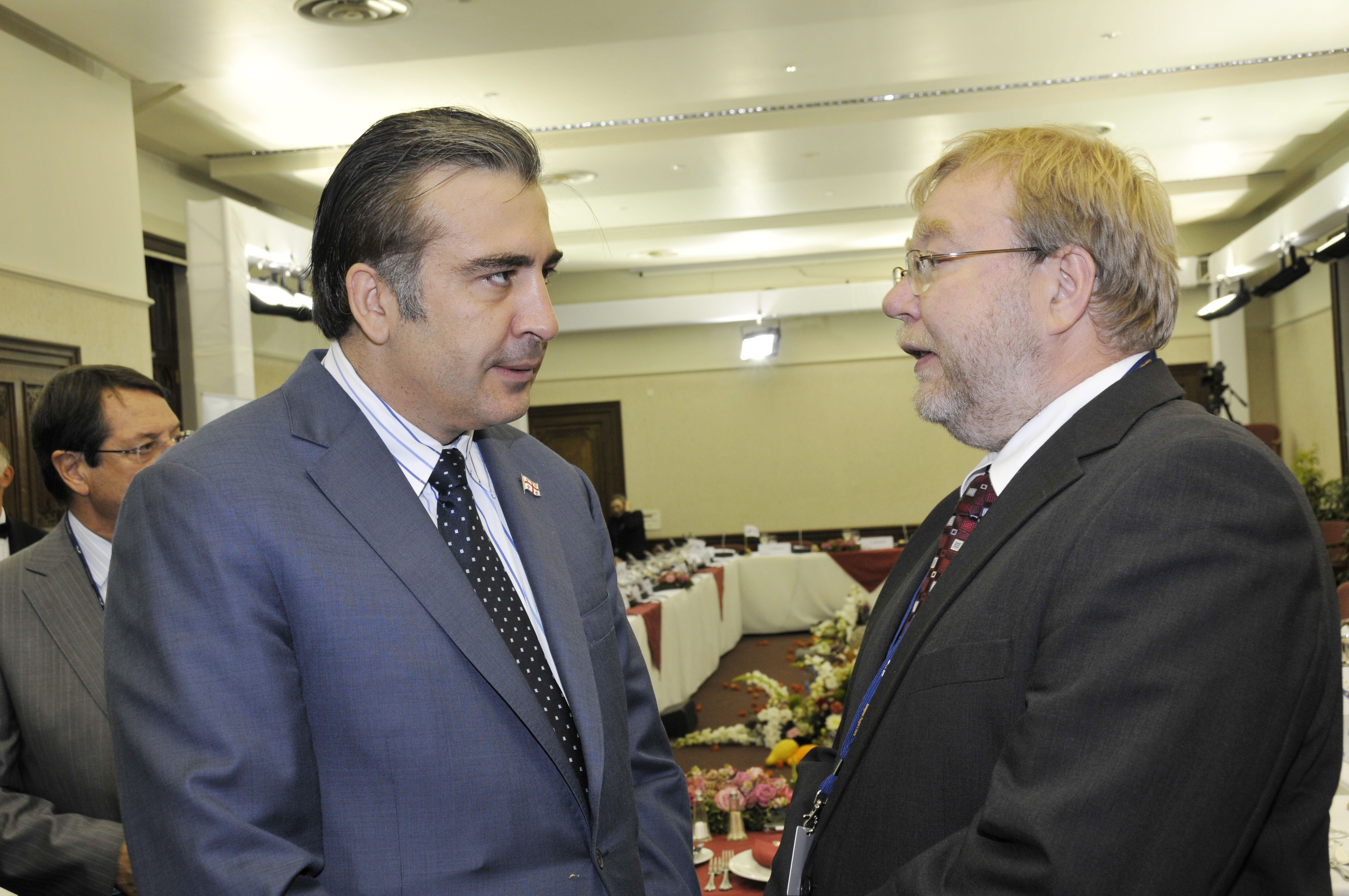
Laar and Mikheil Saakashvili at the European People's Party summit in 2010

Laar is a member of the International Council of the New York-based Human Rights Foundation and a founding member of the Unitas Foundation.

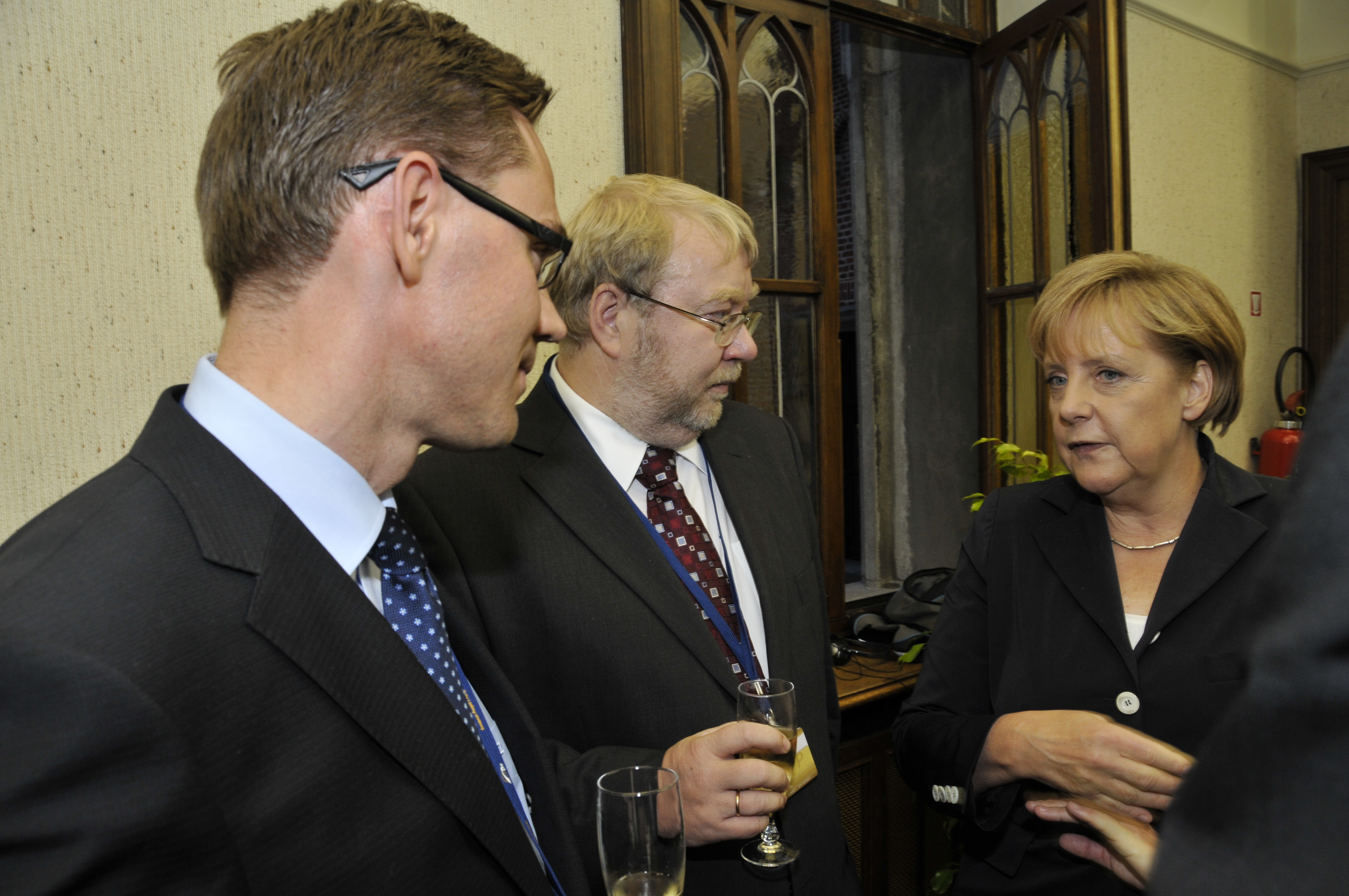
Minister of finance of Finland Jyrki Katainen, Mart Laar and the chancellor of Germany, Angela Merkel in the EPP Summit of 2010

In 2003, Laar received the Wharton Infosys Business Transformation Award brought about the development of electronic systems in Estonia to upgrade the country's infrastructure.

After the Rose Revolution in Georgia, Laar became advisor to the country's president Mikheil Saakashvili and in 2010 received Order of St. George.

In September 2006, Laar announced that he would come out of political retirement to run for the candidacy for prime minister of the new Union of Pro Patria and Res Publica party.

Laar was Mont Pelerin Society member.

On 26 May 2007 he was elected a Chairman of the Union of Pro Patria and Res Publica.

On 18 February 2012 Laar suffered from a stroke and stepped down as Defence Minister three months later. Until October 2012 Laar had still been staying out of the public eye, but was reportedly recovering.

In 2012, the Estonian National Audit Office declassified a 1995 audit about arms deal which caused newspaper Eesti Ekspress to publish a critical article about Laar.

=== Opposition to same-sex marriage ===
On 15 May 2023 a public letter was published in the leading Estonian newspaper Postimees, voicing disapprovement of a recent Government policy decision to extend marriage rights to couples of the same gender.

Laar and his fellow signatories signed a statement containing the following:

Same-sex couples are an insignificant minority in society, while their contribution to the survival of the nation is almost negligible, their contribution to the growth of the nation is nothing as they themselves do not produce offspring. How then can their life together be equated with a traditional marriage?

As the purpose and nature of the way of life of same sex couples is completely different compared to traditional marriage, it remains completely incomprehensible why they are not satisfied with the way of life that suits them which can be called cohabitation. After all, they have been offered an opportunity with the Cohabitation Act But no! In their name, they are now trying to brutally and unquestionably prescribe to the whole nation that all kinds of cohabitation must be called marriage, perhaps ignoring biology.

== Relationship with the media ==
In 1994, the Estonian Newspaper Association declared Laar the Year's Press Friend. This was the first time this award was given; since that, it has been a yearly occurrence. In 2001, Laar was given the complementary award of Year's Press Enemy.

In January 2012, Laar became a meme, when in the heat of the ACTA discussion in Estonia, he explained the disappearance of ACTA-related posts from his Facebook page with "lack of space" in Facebook. Later he clarified that posts were deleted by his page's moderator without his approval and that ACTA requires further discussion.

== Published works ==
- How Estonia is setting the bar for ‘smart defense (The Baltic Times, 2012) (in English)
- The Power of Freedom: Central and Eastern Europe after 1945 (Centre for European Studies, 2009) ISBN 978-9949-18-858-1 (in English)
- Eesti Leegion sõnas ja pildis – The Estonian Legion in words and pictures. Grenader. 2008. ISBN 978-9949-422-61-6.
- "Stalinism Was Just as Bad as Nazism" (The Wall Street Journal, 2008)
- September 1944: Otto Tiefi valitsus (Varrak, 2007) ISBN 9985-3-1390-9 (in Estonian)
- Estonia's Way (Pegasus, 2006) ISBN 9949-425-43-3 (in English)
- Sinimäed 1944 (Tallinn, 2006) ISBN 9985-3-1117-5 (in Estonian)
- Lähiajalugu: gümnaasiumile (Avita, 2006) ISBN 9985-2-1173-1 (in Estonian)
- Estoński cud (Arwil, 2006) ISBN 83-60533-00-8 (in Polish)
- The Forgotten War (Grenader, 2005) ISBN 9949-411-75-0 (in English)
- Der vergessene Krieg (Grenader, 2005) ISBN 9949-411-76-9 (in German)
- Der rote Terror (Grenader, 2005) ISBN 9949-411-82-3 (in German)
- Sarkanais terors (Grenader, 2005) ISBN 9949-411-78-5 (in Latvian)
- Aizmirstais karš (Grenader, 2005) ISBN 9949-411-72-6 (in Latvian)
- Unohdettu sota (Grenader, 2005) ISBN 9949-411-73-4 (in Finnish)
- Eestlase raha läbi aegade (Eesti Ekspressi Kirjastus, 2006) ISBN 9985-9625-6-7 (in Estonian)
- Igaunija otraja pasaules kara (Grenader, 2005) ISBN 9949-411-90-4 (in Latvian)
- Estonia in World War II (Grenader, 2005) ISBN 9949-411-93-9 (in English)
- Viron lyhyt historia' (Grenader, 2005) ISBN 9949-411-85-8 (in Finnish)
- Streifzug durch die estnische Geschichte (Grenader, 2005) ISBN 9949-411-88-2 (in German)
- Äratajad (Tartu, 2005) ISBN 9985-858-43-3 (in Estonian)
- Igaunijas vestures konspektivs parskats (Grenader, 2005) ISBN 978-9949-411-84-9 (in Latvian)
- Linnulennul Eesti ajaloost (Grenader, 2005) ISBN 9949-411-83-1 (in Estonian)
- Estonia: A Land of Human Dimensions (Uniprint AS, 2004) ISBN 9949-10-270-7 (in English)
- Emajõgi 1944 (Tallinn, 2005) ISBN 9985-3-1183-3 (in Estonian)
- Das estnische Wirtschaftwunder (Tallinn, 2002) ISBN 978-9985-62-078-6 (in German)
- Estonia: Little Country that Could (London, 2002) ISBN 0-948027-40-1 (in English)
- Eesti uus algus (Tallinn, 2002) ISBN 9985-62-079-8 (in Estonian)
- Vissza a jövőbe (Budapest, 2002) ISBN 963-9406-96-1 (in Hungarian)
- Back to the future. 10 years of freedom in Central Europe (Tallinn, 2001) (in English)
- Észtország története (BDTF, 1999) ISBN 963-9017-70-1 (in Hungarian)
- Estonoj tra tempoj (Eesti Esperanto Liit, 1998) ISBN 9985-9130-3-5 (in Esperanto)
- Eesti Vabadussõda ja Suurbritannia 1918–1920 (Tallinn, 1998) (in Estonian)
- Ajalugu 5. klassile (Avita, 1997) ISBN 978-9985-2-0025-4 (in Estonian)
- Isamaa ilu hoieldes (Välis-Eesti & EMP, 1997) (in Estonian)
- Teine Eesti: Eesti iseseisvuse taassünd 1986–1991 (Tallinn, 1996) ISBN 9985-854-03-9 (in Estonian)
- Punane terror (Välis-Eesti & EMP, 1996) ISBN 978-91-86116-72-9 (in Estonian)
- Raamat Jakob Hurdast (Tartu. 1995) (in Estonian)
- Suurim armastus (Välis-Eesti & EMP, 1994) (in Estonian)
- The Challenge for Europe (London, 1994) ISBN 1-897969-23-6 (in English)
- Metsavennad (Tallinn, 1993) ISBN 9985-821-44-0 (in Estonian)
- Unohdettu sota (FinnEpos, 1993) ISBN 952-9523-18-1 (in Finnish)
- War in the Woods (Howells House, 1992) ISBN 0-929590-08-2 (in English)
- 14 juuni 1941.a: mälestusi ja dokumente (Tallinn, 1990) (in Estonian)
- Kodu lugu (Tallinn, 1989) (in Estonian)

Political offices
Preceded by Tiit Vähi	Prime Minister of Estonia; 1992–1994	Succeeded by Andres Tarand
Preceded by Mart Siimann	Prime Minister of Estonia; 1999–2002	Succeeded by Siim Kallas
Preceded by Jaak Aaviksoo	Minister of Defence of Estonia; 2011–2012	Succeeded by Urmas Reinsalu
