= Ants Erm =

Estonian politician (born 1953)

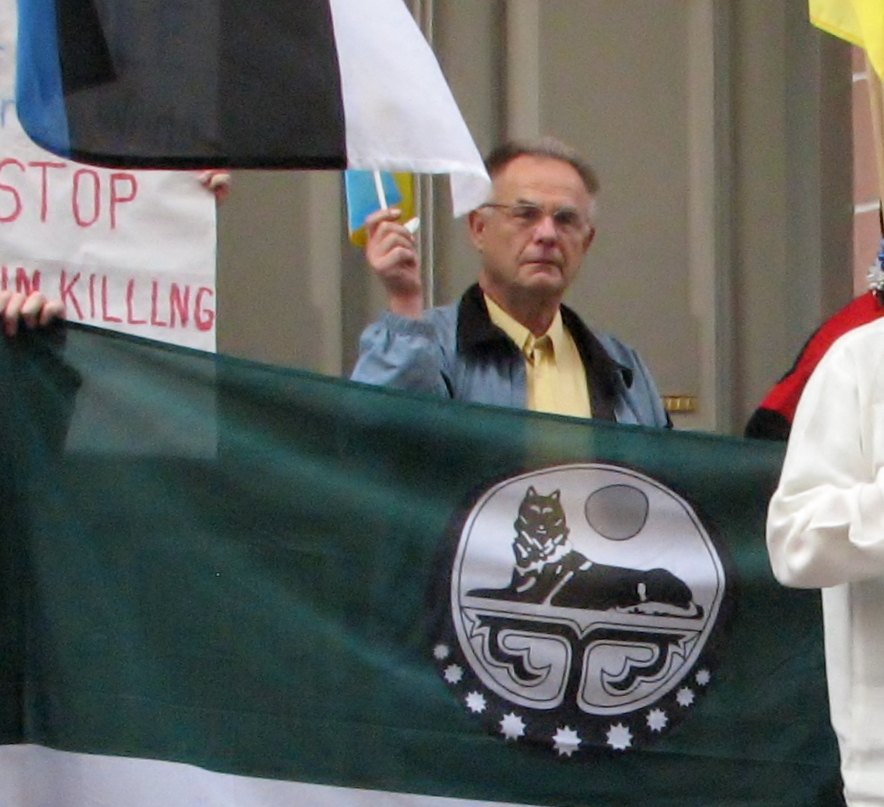
Ants Erm

Ants Erm (born 1 September 1953 in Tallinn) is an Estonian marine scientist and politician. He was a member of VII Riigikogu.
