= Aik Adzhoglian =

- Айк Григорович Аджоглян
- Born: April 18, 1989 in Yerevan
- Occupations: political scientist; political consultant; art collector
- Years active: 2010 to current

Aik Adzhoglian (born April 18, 1989) is a Russian political scientist, political consultant, and art collector.

== Biography ==
Aik was born in Yerevan, Armenia. He studied state and municipal governance at the Pomorsky State University in Arkhangelsk and obtained a postgraduate diploma in political institutions, processes, and technologies from the Northern (Arctic) Federal University. Later, he completed a candidate of science program with research on the development of political parties in the north of European Russia.

== Career ==
While a student, Aik joined the university's professional association and worked as the deputy head of the Council of Young Scientists' regional office and later as the head of the Youth Council of the Northern district of Arkhangelsk. Around 2009, he started working as a political consultant and served as the head of electoral staff for Andrey Ryzhkov of the Communist Party of Russia. In 2010, he joined the Young Guard of United Russia and was promoted to the head of human resources, election campaigns, and media in Arkhangelsk Oblast. He also won local council elections at Povrakulskaya, Primorsky District, Arkhangelsk Oblast.

In 2012, Aik was promoted to the head of political agitation for the regional committee of the United Russia, effectively becoming one of the youngest political managers in Russia. Following the successful local and regional elections, he was assigned as the commissioner for regional and technological operations of the party's Central Executive Committee. He ran campaigns for the Vologodskaya Oblast governor, as well as campaigns in Moscow, Saint Petersburg, Leningrad Oblast, Samara Oblast, Arkhangelsk Oblast, the Republic of Karelia, the Republic of Komi, Nenets Autonomous Okrug, etc. He helped local governments communicate to the general public about complex decisions, such as industrial construction or waste sorting and disposal.

Later, Aik worked on establishing Centers for Regional Management and Municipal Centers for Management in the Northwestern Federal District of Russia. These non-governmental organizations aided local authorities in communicating with citizens and managing their requests, and operated as think tanks that help make better governance decisions. Since 2015, he runs his own public relations bureau. In 2025, he was ranked among the top Russian political consultants by the professional community and industry media The Sober Political Technologist.

== Collection ==
Aik is a notable collector of contemporary Russian art with a collection including several hundred pieces, from both local and rising artists and established masters. He considers Peter Ludwig and Solomon Guggenheim his role models as collectors. Aik is especially interested in regional art, and his collection of works from Arkhangelsk Oblast was on display in Sevkabel Port in 2023 as part of the Street-art Storage project. In 2025, he joined the Bureau de change, the experimental project of the Private Collections Biennale, built around the exchange of works, ideas, and narratives between art collectors.

His collection includes the works by Olga Tobreluts, Ilya Kabakov, Yuri Avvakumov, Dmitri Prigov, Vladimir Abikh, Mikhail Treschev, Philip Uchuvatkin, Mikhail Roginsky, Piotr Diakov, Boris Leonidov, Andrei Luka, Nika Kletski, Vladislav Mamyshev-Monroe, Rinat Abrakhmanov, Dmitry Markov, Masha Sha, Tima Radya, Peter Belenok, Kirill Kto, Misha Kachikarakis, Zhenya Collins, Francisco Infante-Arana, Leonid Borisov, Egor Fedorichev, Sergei Prokofiev, Anna Andrzhievskaya, Grekht, Oleg Tselkov, Alexandra Gart, Liza Bobkova, Nestor Engelke, Anastasia Ivanenkova, Viktor Alimpiev, Dmitry Gutov, Vlad Kulkov, and Artem Khazanov.

Aik is a patron of the Apartment Museum of Joseph Brodsky in Saint Petersburg.

== Recognition ==
Aik holds several state honours, such as the Russian Federation Presidential Certificate of Honour, the Letter of Gratitude from the President of the Russian Federation, and letters of gratitude from the Head of the Central Election Commission of Russia, the governors of the regions of Russia, and the Secretary of the General Council of United Russia.

In 2024, the Public Relations Association of Russia awarded Aik Adzhoglian its best best political campaign award for the Lipetsk Oblast governor election campaign for Igor Artamonov.

== Publications ==
- A. Adzhoglian (2016). "The efficiency of regional parliaments: quality vs quantity". Regional Studies.
- A. Adzhoglian, I. Novikov (2016). "Primary elections as an electoral relations strategy". Vlast: 39–45.
