= Liteyny Avenue =

Thoroughfare in Saint Petersburg, Russia

Coordinates: 59.9408°N 30.3483°E

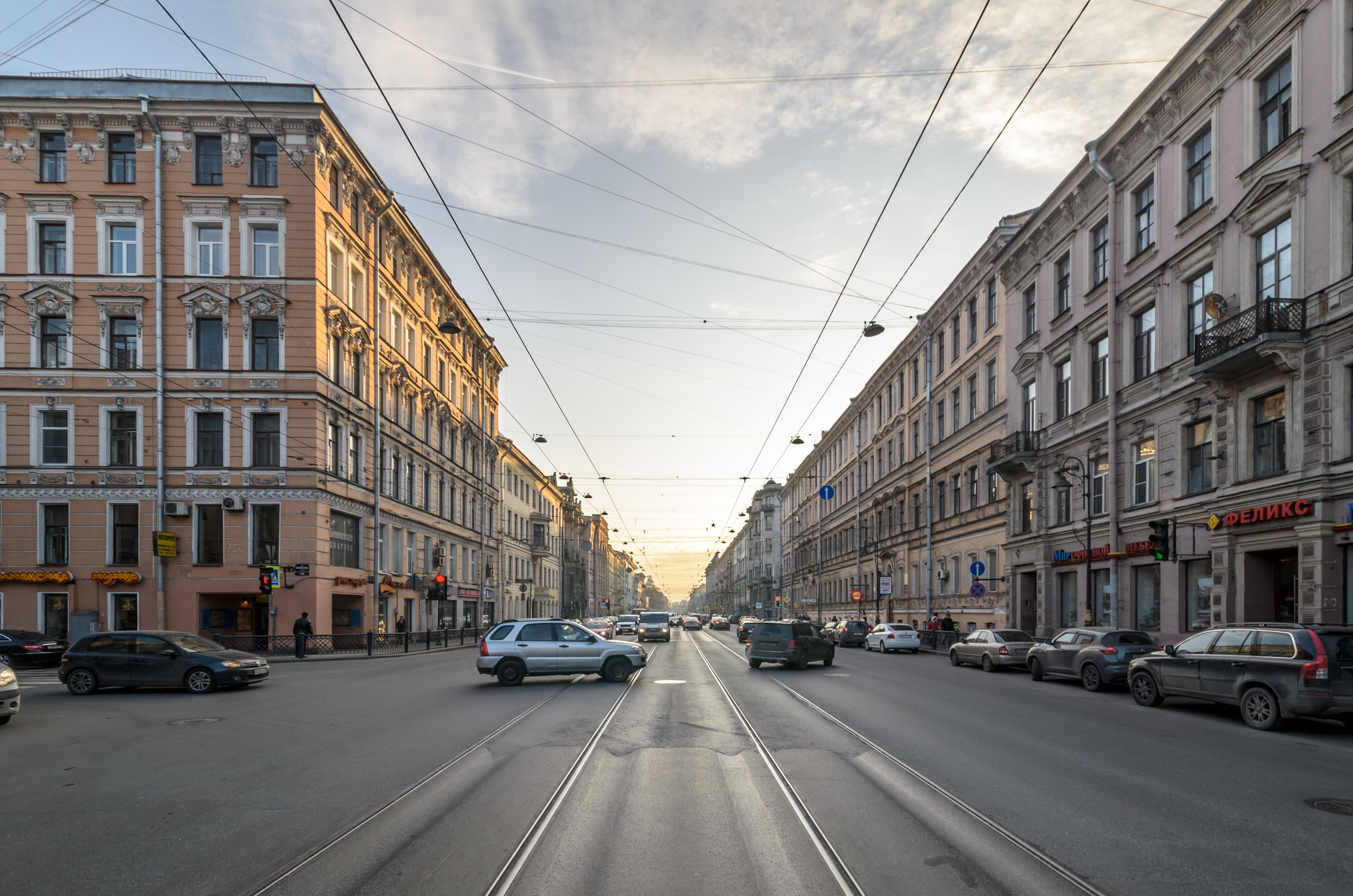
Liteyny Avenue in St. Petersburg

Liteyny Avenue (Russian: Литейный проспект, Liteyny prospekt) is a wide avenue in the Central District of Saint Petersburg, Russia. The avenue runs from Liteyny Bridge to Nevsky Avenue.

The avenue originated in 1738 when the forest was cleared to make a trail from Nevsky Prospekt to a foundry (est. 1711) at the banks of Neva River. The Russian word "liteyny" means "metal casting" as an adjective, hence the street name.

Soon after the October Revolution, the avenue was named Prospekt Volodarskogo after the death of the Russian revolutionary V. Volodarsky in 1918. In 1944, the historic name was restored.

== Notable locations ==
- No. 4 – the Big House, former NKVD building, currently local city government office.
- No. 14 – the 19th-century Varvara Dolgoruky mansion.
- No. 24 – Muruzi House with Joseph Brodsky apartment.
- No. 36 – Nekrasov Museum.
- No. 37 – Department of Crown Domain ('Dom departamenta udelov'), 1840s, Harold Bosse.
- No. 42 – former Zinaida Yusupova mansion, currently St. Petersburg Institute of International Trade, Economics and Law.
- No. 56 – Mariinsky Hospital (built by Giacomo Quarenghi).
