= Sevkabel Port =

Public space in Saint Petersburg

Sevkabel Port is a public space for culture and business created after the reorganization of the industrial "Grey Belt" of Vasilyevsky Island harbour in Saint Petersburg, Russia, on the coast of the Gulf of Finland. This open space is located near the Marine Station. The area allocated for the cluster is situated between the river and Kozhevennaya Line, with roughly one-fifth of the land — a section near the waterfront — set aside. The main production zone, optimized for efficiency, extends north of the street and reaches further into the city.

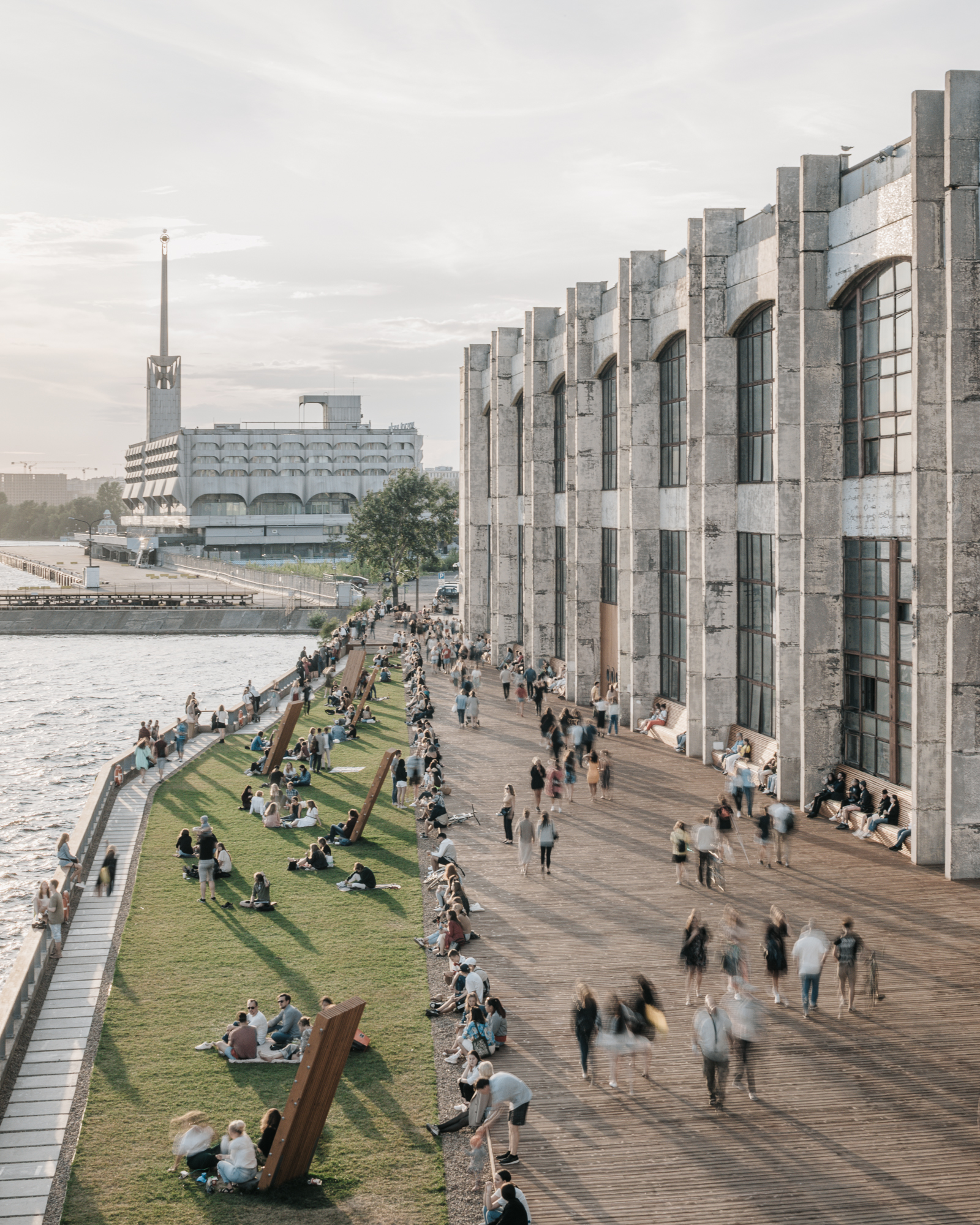
View of the Sevkabel Port embankment

== History ==
The public space is located on part of the land of the Sevkabel factory, the oldest cable manufacturing factory in Russia. It was founded by the German industrialist Werner Siemens in 1879 as a factory of the Siemens & Halske company for the production of lamps, cables, and switches.

In 1918, the factory was nationalized and given its present name. It subsequently made a substantial contribution to the electrification of the entire USSR.

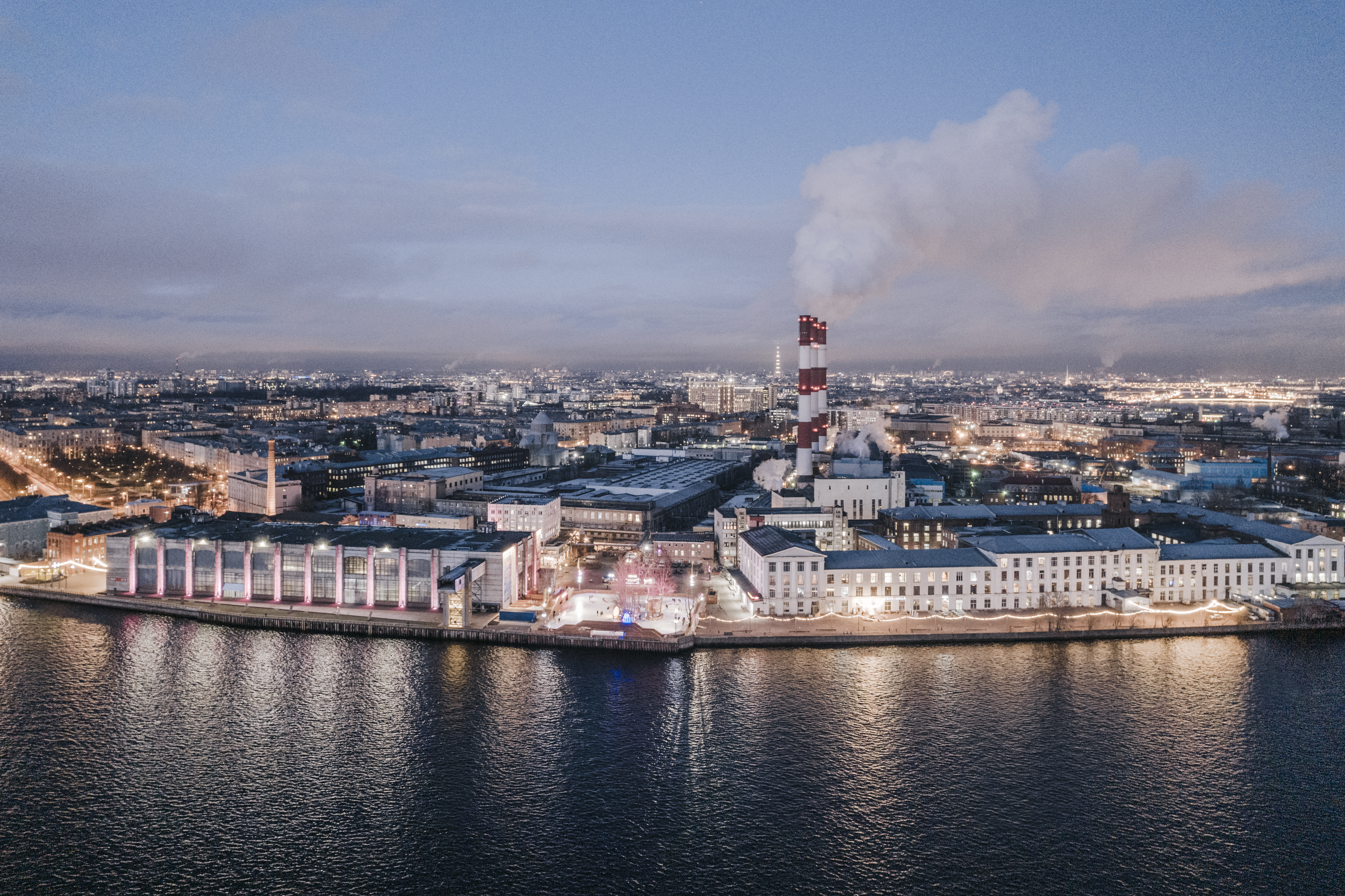
Winter view of Sevkabel Port from the Gulf of Finland

In 2017, the management of the factory decided to upgrade the area and make it a public site in Saint Petersburg with access to the sea. The industrial area gradually developed into a cultural and business space. As part of the production modernization, the Sevkabel factory has moved its capacities to its shops at Kozhevennaya 39, thus freeing up 20% of its total space for the creation of a cultural and business project.

Sevkabel Port was officially opened in September 2018, but the visitors could attend the first event a month after the start of the renovation, in June 2017. An outdoor winter ice rink has been open since November 2018 on the territory of Sevkabel Port. The official name of the ice rink with an area of more than 2,200 m2 is the Rink by the Sea.

In the summer of 2019, at the XV Congress of the Organization of World Heritage Cities in Krakow, five projects represented Saint Petersburg. One of which was Sevkabel Port, which became the winner of the Jean-Paul-L'Allier Prize. A commemorative plaque was installed in honour of this victory of Saint Petersburg. It also hosted Present Perfect, a three-day electronic music festival with more than 60 artists from around the world. The Berlin music duo Modeselektor headlined the festival. The annual summer music festival STEREOLETO has been held at Sevkabel Port since 2019.

In the summer of 2021, the exhibition "Andy Warhol and Russian Art" took place at Sevkabel Port, displaying over 100 works by Andy Warhol.

In the autumn of 2021, an international multimedia art exhibition, “Hydra. New Media Art in the Context of Eco-Anxiety,” took place. Artists from Canada, France, Italy, Norway, Russia, Slovakia, and the UK took part in it.

In 2021, the exhibition space became fully operational.

In May 2022, the inclusive cluster Normal Place was opened in Sevkabel Port in Saint Petersburg. It is a space in which non-profit organizations and social entrepreneurs develop their projects. A coworking space is available here, as well as a variety of workshops and art practices.

In 2022, the “Balabanov” travelling exhibition in memory of Alexei Balabanov opened at Sevkabel Port. The project won the annual “Petersburg of the Future” award.

== Location ==
The area allocated for the cluster is situated between the Neva River and the Kozhevennaya line. About one-fifth of it — the area near the water — is separated. Sevkabel Port is located on the banks of the Neva in Vasilyevsky Island harbour, close to the Maritime Station, a monument to Soviet brutalism.

There are several buildings on the site of the new multifunctional space: a three-storey factory management building of the late 19th century with a chimney, and a one-storey building designed for the production of cable reels at the factory. A chain of open public spaces has formed around the perimeter of the largest building.

The gates on Kozhevennaya line between the 19th-century brick building and the 20th-century concrete one — four large rotatable Corten pylons — mark both the factory's past and the creative present of the area, which is an art object that is changed every season.

The open space behind the mansion is divided into two unequal parts: one, which is slightly larger, is allocated to the festival area. The other, smaller but adjacent to the river, became a multifunctional area with a convertible amphitheatre, sun loungers, and an ice rink in winter.

The historic red-brick buildings are mainly used for small workshops, bureaus, and offices, with catering outlets on the ground floors. The Soviet administrative building accommodates a variety of educational and sports projects, as well as shops. The largest production hall, which forms the sea front, includes a multipurpose area, a concert club, and a restaurant on the ground level. The second level houses the exhibition space.

The pier functions here. This is a particular pride of the architects, as it fully justifies the name “Port” assigned to the new creative space.

== Lighting ideas ==
The alley is lined with coil lights inspired by coil installations, with light reflecting off wooden structures. Such lights have wheels; they are mobile and can be easily moved and rearranged.

The first of the buildings open to the public, the former cable tare area, has been given a deep portal decorated with "recessed" circle lamps in the wall, allowing light to be cast through the metal.

Street art murals and the pier tower are highlighted by lights with narrow oval optics.

Special anti-vandal grids have been developed for all ground-mounted units to protect the lights but not to distort the light output.

There is also the first direct current generator in the USSR, the Tesla coil, located on the Sea Square of Sevkabel Port. It consists of a cascade of transformers designed for 1,500,000 volts. It was formerly located in the factory's laboratory, which also had a 2,000,000-volt direct current generator and a 3,000,000-volt pulse generator. The laboratory was set up in 1947 under the direction of Chief Engineer and Director Dmitry Bykov, and the generator was created in 1949 for practical testing of scientific developments
