= Apartment Museum of Joseph Brodsky =

Biographical museum in St. Petersburg, Russia

Coordinates: 59°56′34″N 30°20′56″E

- Музей-квартира И. А. Бродского
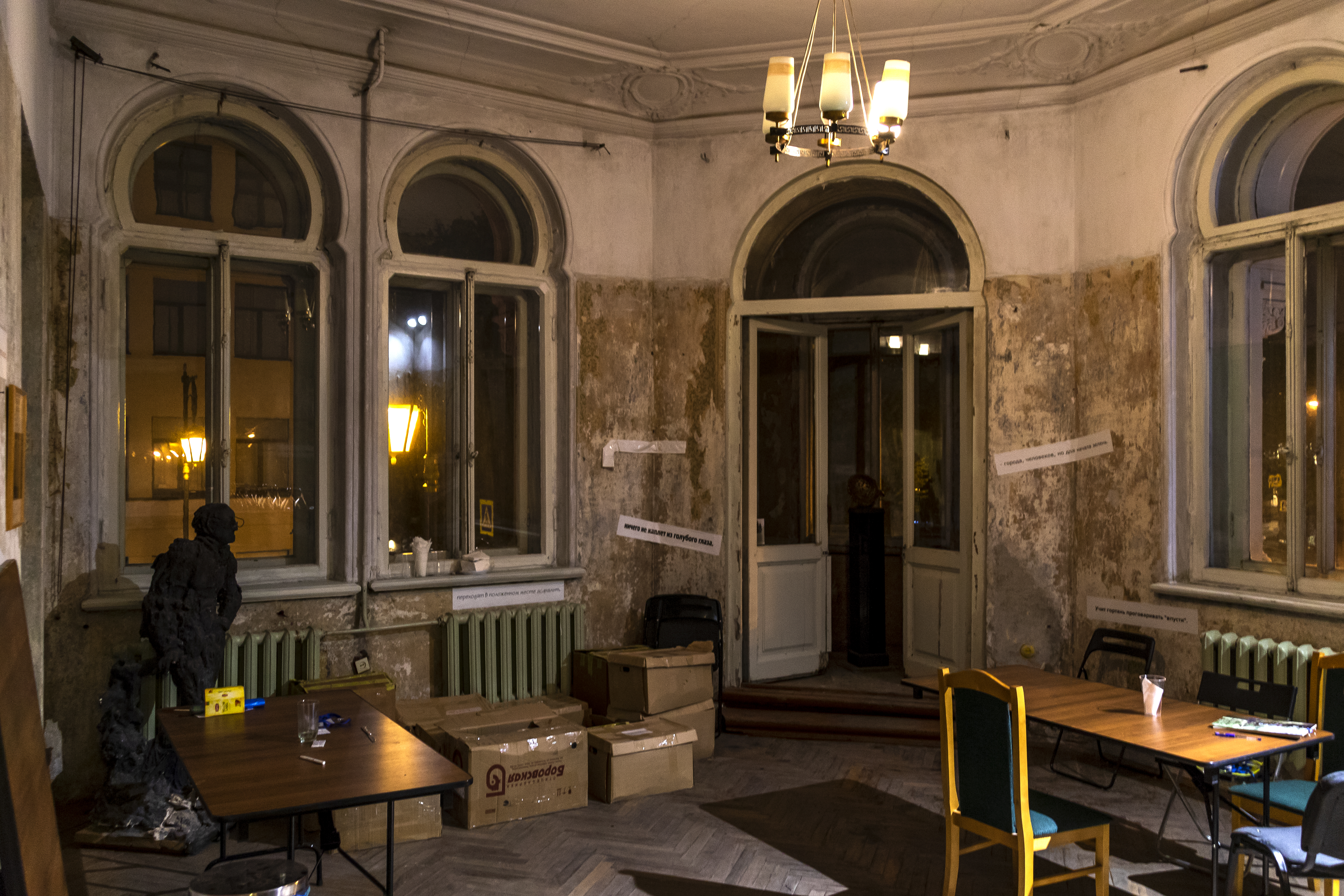
- Location: St. Petersburg, Foundry Avenue, 24
- Director: Nina Popova
- Website: brodsky.online

Apartment Museum of Joseph Brodsky (Russian: Музей-квартира И. А. Бродского) is an informal memorial museum, created in 2006 on behalf of the governor of St. Petersburg, in order to preserve the memory of the cultural and literary period 1960-1990, the central figure of which is the poet and Nobel laureate, Joseph Brodsky. The concept of the future exposition deals Anna Akhmatova Museum.

The apartment is in the Muruzi House. The museum does not officially operate, as its founders failed to acquire the whole apartment. Therefore, the museum is still officially a residential unit.
