= Povrakulskaya =

Povrakulskaya Повракульская
- Village
- Location within Arkhangelsk Oblast Location within Russia
- Coordinates: 64°36′N 40°23′E
- Country: Russia
- Region: Arkhangelsk Oblast
- District: Primorsky District
- Time zone: UTC+3:00

Povrakulskaya (Russian: Повракульская) is a rural locality (a village) in Talazhskoye Rural Settlement of Primorsky District, Arkhangelsk Oblast, Russia. The population was 559 as of 2010. There are 8 streets.

== Geography ==
Povrakulskaya is located on the Povrakulsky Island, 14 km north of Arkhangelsk (the district's administrative centre) by road. Talagi is the nearest rural locality.
