= Muruzi House =

Apartment building in central Saint Petersburg, Russia

- Дом Мурузи
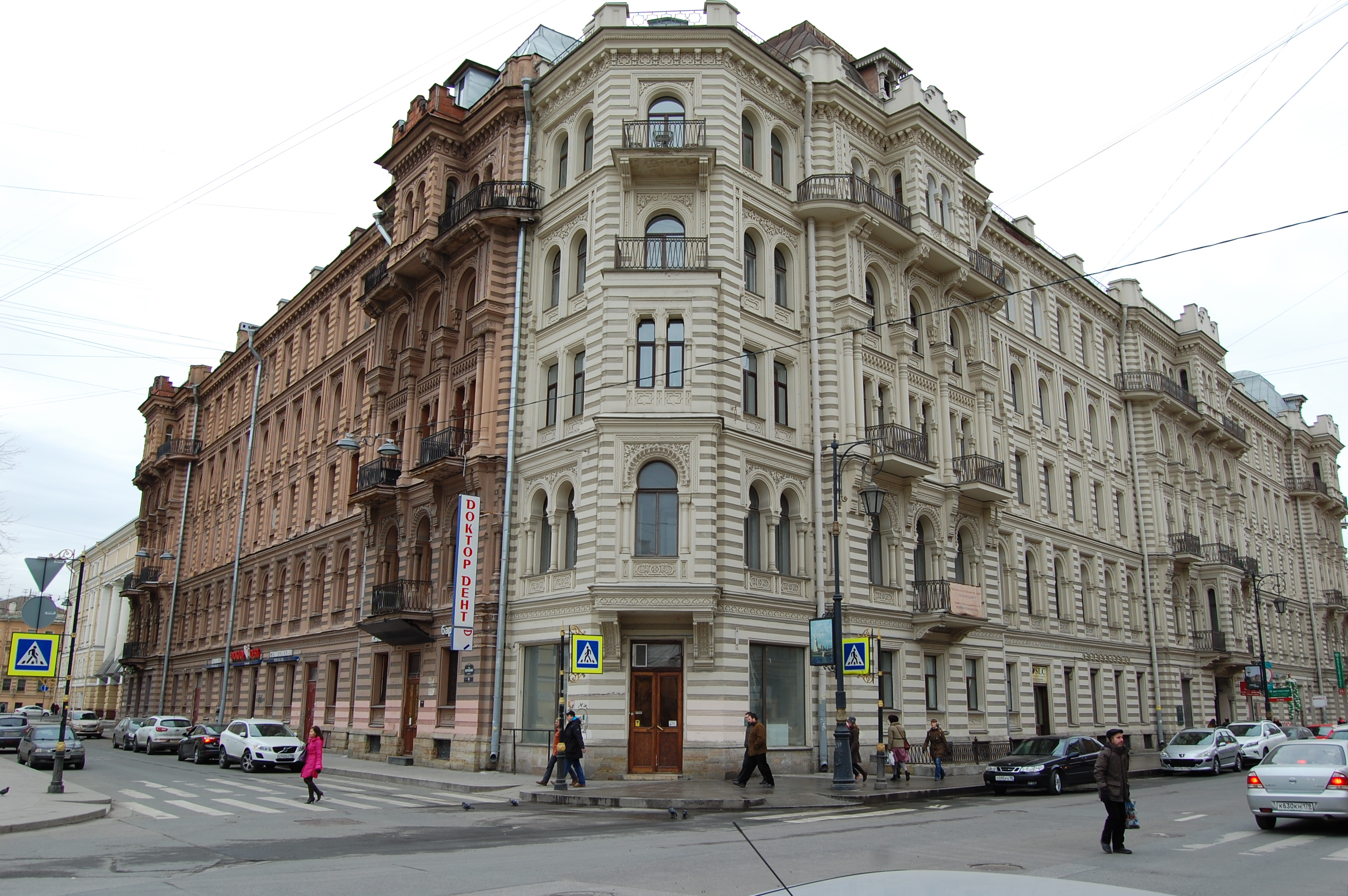
- View of the Muruzi House from the corner of Korolenko Street (left) and Pestel Street, the left side under older paint.

General information
- Architectural style: neo-Moorish architecture (Neo-Mudéjar)
- Location: Saint Petersburg, Liteyny Avenue, 24
- Completed: 1874-1877

Design and construction
- Architect(s): A. C. Serebryakov, P. I. Shestov

Muruzi House is a notable apartment building – a former revenue house in central Saint Petersburg, Russia, constructed in 1874–1877 by architects Aleksey Serebryakov and Pyotr Shestov for count Alexander Dmitrievich Mourouzis (Muruzi) on the land that once belonged to Nikolai Rezanov. The interiors were designed by Nikolai Sultanov.

From 1890 until the Revolution the house was owned by Lieutenant General Oskar Rein.

It is noteworthy for its neo-Moorish architecture and as a place of residence or work of a number of Russian-language literary persons: for example, in 1955–1972 Russian poet Joseph Brodsky resided in the Muruzi house, nowadays his memorial museum is opened at his former apartment. Before him residents included the early 20 century family of authors Zinaida Gippius and Dmitry Merezhkovskiy and later a Soviet and modern Russia prose writer Daniil Granin; Poets' House opened here in 1920 under Nikolay Gumilyov, and Korney Chukovskiy opened a studio for teaching young literary translators under the post-revolutionary publishing project Vsemirnaya literatura ("World Literature").
