= Marine Station (Saint Petersburg) =

Coordinates: 59.9260°N 30.2354°E

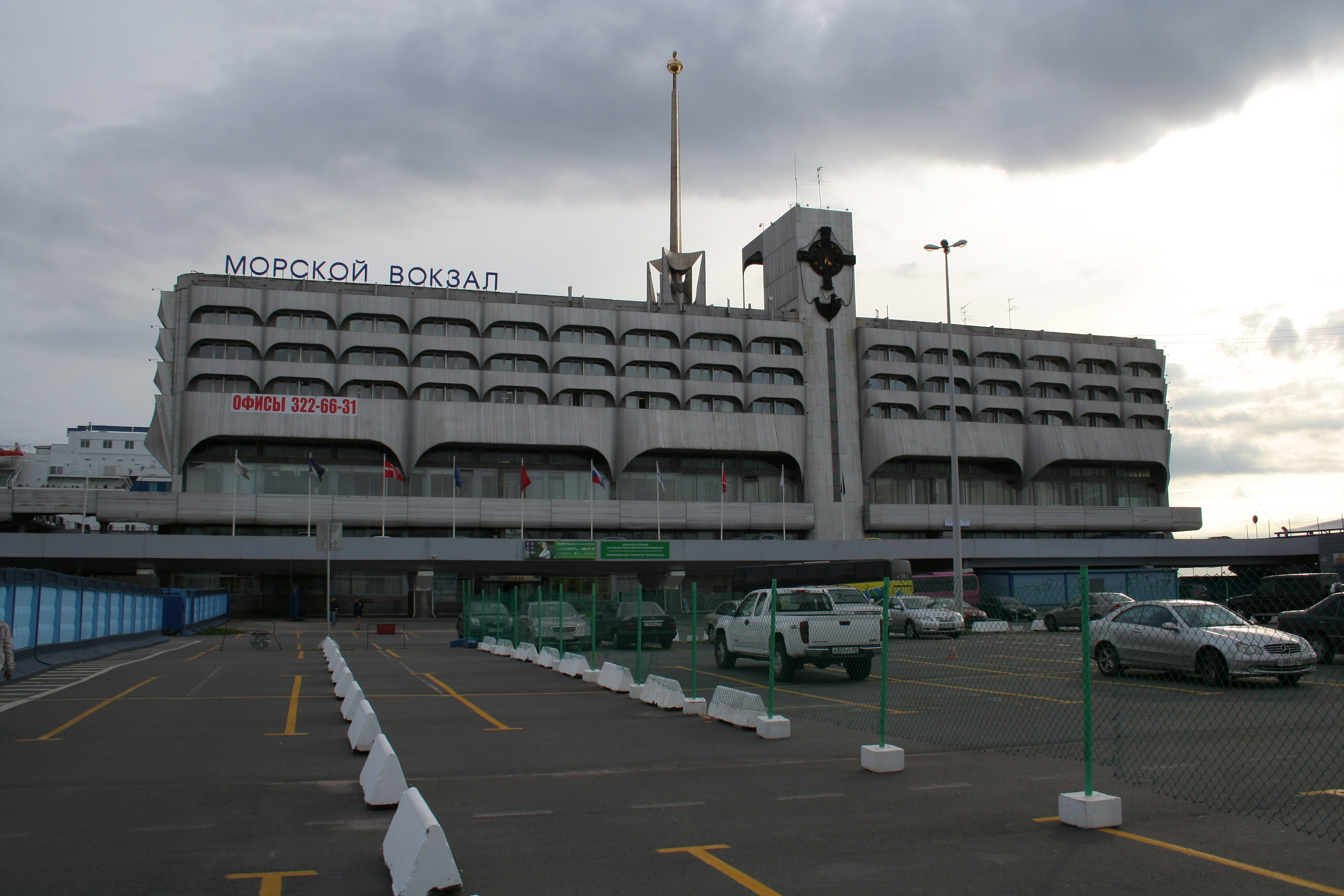
View of the Marine Station

The Marine Station or Marine Terminal (Russian: Морской вокзал) is a marine passenger terminal in Saint Petersburg. It was opened in 1982 specifically for the reception and processing of cruise and ferry vessels. The station is located on the western tip of Vasilyevsky Island, at No. 1, Square of Maritime Glory. The complex includes five berths, a place for border and customs inspection, restaurant, hotel and conference complex.

The station building was built between 1973 and 1983, designed by architects V. A. Sokhin and Leonid Kalyagin. The walls of the station are lined with volumetric panels in the form of sails; a ship is depicted on a 78-meter titanium spire. Originally the building was built for the Baltic Sea Steamship Company and served as both a station for visitors arriving by sea and as an inter-voyage base for the sailors of the shipping company.
