= Palamuse Parish =

Former municipality of Estonia

Coordinates: 58.685°N 26.579°E

Palamuse Parish Palamuse vald
- Former municipality of Estonia
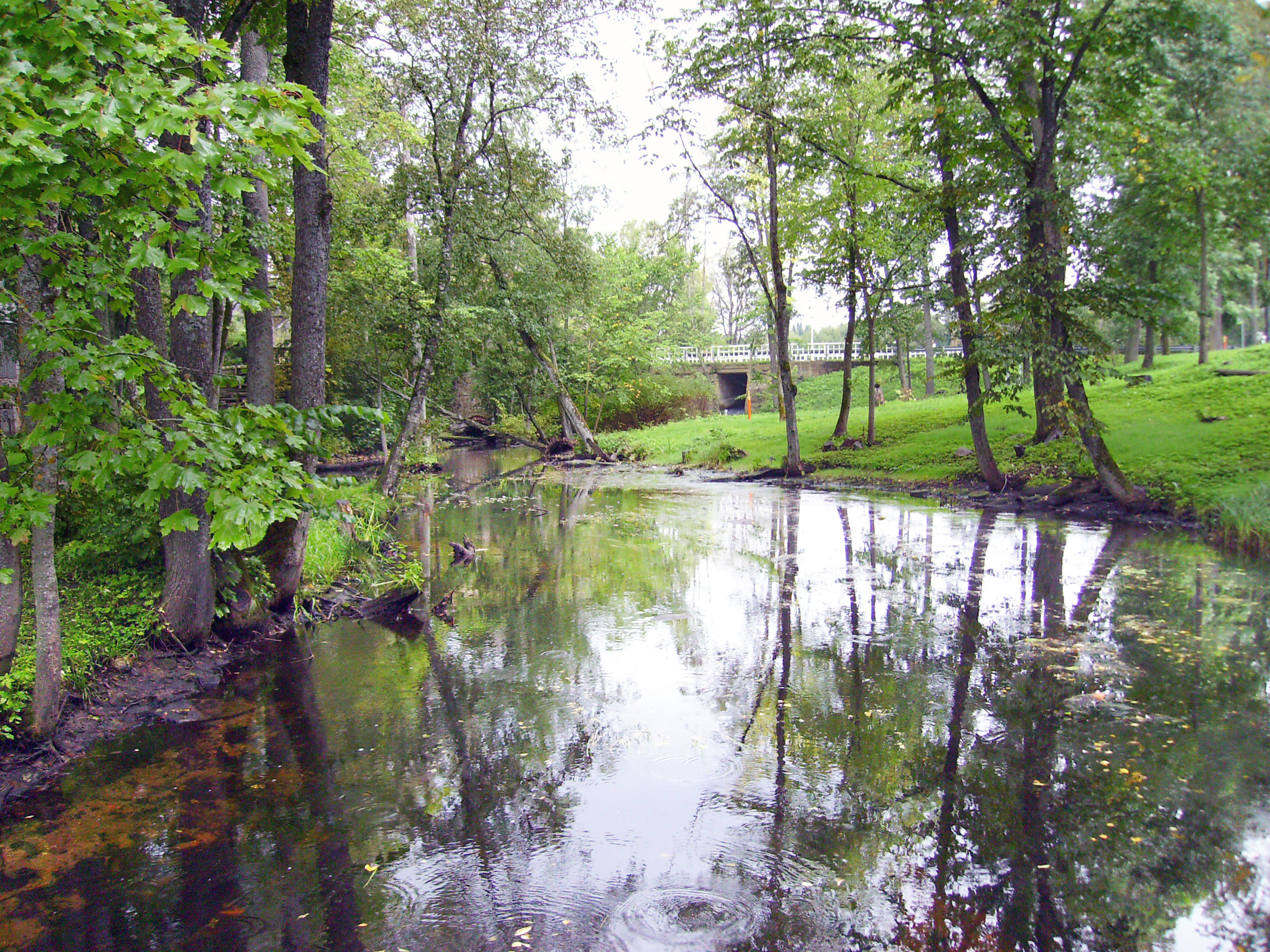
- Amme river

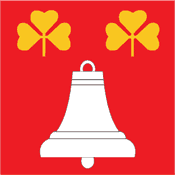
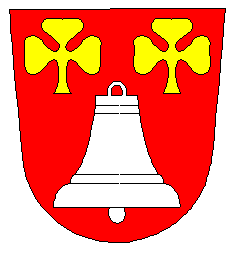
- Flag Coat of arms

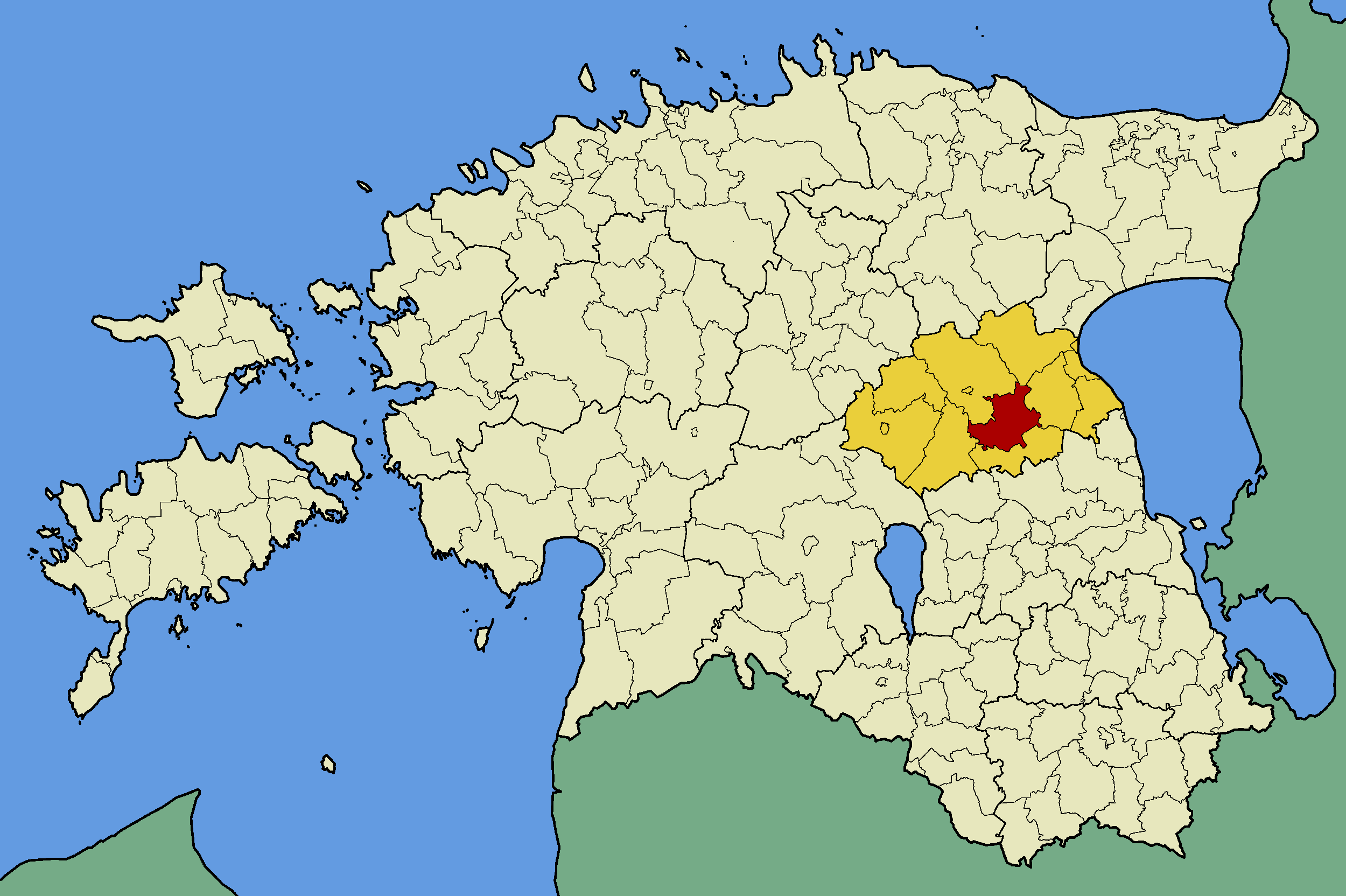
- Palamuse Parish within Jõgeva County.
- Country: Estonia
- County: Jõgeva County
- Administrative centre: Palamuse

Area
  - Total: 216 km^{2} (83 sq mi)

Population (2006)
  - Total: 2,509
  - Density: 11.6/km^{2} (30.1/sq mi)
- Website: www.palamuse.ee

Palamuse (Estonian: Palamuse vald) was a rural municipality of Estonia, in Jõgeva County. It had a population of 2,509 (2006) and an area of 216 km^{2}.

== Populated places ==
Palamuse Parish had one small borough, Palamuse, and 25 villages: Änkküla, Eerikvere, Ehavere, Imukvere, Järvepera, Kaarepere, Kaiavere, Kassivere, Kivimäe, Kudina, Luua, Mullavere, Nava, Pikkjärve, Praaklima, Raadivere, Rahivere, Ronivere, Sudiste, Süvalepa, Toovere, Vaidavere, Vanavälja, Varbevere, Visusti.
