= Estonian temporary travel document =

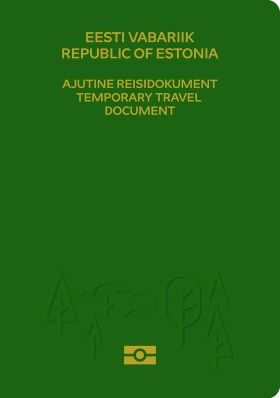
- Cover of an Estonian temporary travel document since 2021
- Type: Travel document
- Issued by: Estonia
- First issued: 1991 (first version); 2007 (machine-readable and biometric); 2021 (current version)
- Purpose: Identification and Travel
- Eligibility: Estonian residents who are not Estonian citizens
- Expiration: 2 years after issuance

An Estonian temporary travel document (Ajutine Reisidokument) is a travel document issued to an alien staying in Estonia for departure from and return to Estonia. A temporary travel document may be issued, without a standard application, to an alien who departs or is obliged to depart from Estonia without the right of return if he or she does not hold a valid travel document or a certificate of return issued by a foreign state. A temporary travel document for a single departure from and return to Estonia may be issued to an alien legally residing in Estonia if he or she does not hold a valid travel document and does not have the right to receive an alien’s passport. A temporary travel document does not grant the holder thereof the right to protection by a foreign mission of Estonia unless otherwise provided by law or a treaty. A temporary travel document shall be issued with a period of validity of up to two years.

== Background ==
By applying for the temporary travel document, the applicant is required to give the fingerprints that will be entered to the temporary travel document. Temporary travel document can be applied for in the Service Offices. Temporary travel document is issued by the Estonian Police and Border Guard within 30 days (after the application was received for processing) to an applicant in person or to an authorised representative assigned by an applicant (recommended form, possible to fill in on a computer screen or print out and fill in by own hand) at the time of applying for the document, in the Service Office.

If the Estonian temporary travel document has become unusable, has been destroyed, has expired or has been lost while staying in a foreign state, an Estonian permit of return may be issued to an alien for return to Estonia, if the alien resides in the Republic of Estonia on the basis of a residence permit. The Estonian permit of return shall be issued with a period of validity of up to twelve months. The period of validity of a permit of return issued on the basis specified in clause of this Act shall not exceed the period of validity of the residence permit issued to the alien. Upon entry into Estonia, a permit of return shall be returned to the Police and Border Guard Board, which shall forward the permit to the Ministry of Foreign Affairs.

Any EU citizen can request an Estonian temporary travel document after residence, if it is impossible to get the citizen passport from his own EU country by any reason.

== Identity Information Page ==
Cover of an old (before 2014) Estonian temporary travel document

Information page of an Estonian temporary travel document

The Estonia Passport includes the following data:

- Photo of passport holder
- Type (P for ordinary passports)
- Code of Issuing State (EST)
- Passport No.
- 1 Surname
- 2 Given Names
- 3 Nationality
- 4 Date of Birth
- 5 Personal No.
- 6 Sex
- 7 Place of Birth
- 8 Date of Issue
- 9 Authority
- 10 Date of Expiry
- 11 Holder's Signature

The information page ends with the Machine Readable Zone.

== Languages ==
The data page/information page is printed in Estonian, English and French.

== Biometric temporary travel documents ==
Starting from June 2009, all applicants for an Estonian temporary travel document are required to provide their fingerprints to be stored on the biometric chip in their passports.

== See also ==
- Estonian passport
- Estonian identity card
- Estonian seafarer's discharge book
- Estonian alien's passport
- Estonian travel document for refugees
- Estonian nationality law
