= Citizenship and Migration Board (Estonia) =

Government agency of Estonia

Citizenship and Migration Board Kodakondsus- ja Migratsiooniamet

Agency overview
- Formed: 28 December 1993
- Preceding agencies: Citizenship Board; Migration Board
- Dissolved: 2010

Jurisdictional structure
- National agency: EST
- Operations jurisdiction: EST
- Governing body: Ministry of Internal Affairs
- Specialist jurisdiction: Immigration

Website
- http://www.mig.ee

The Citizenship and Migration Board (CMB) was a government agency in Estonia under the Ministry of Internal Affairs that was in charge of enforcing regulations concerning immigration and nationality. In 2010, it was merged with other agencies and formed Police and Border Guard Board.

== Issuance of travel documents ==
The CMB was the authority which issued the following Estonian travel documents:

- Estonian passport
- Estonian alien's passport
- Estonian identity card

== Processing of nationality applications ==
The CMB was responsible for processing applications and enquiries concerning Estonian citizenship.

== Immigration control ==
The CMB was responsible for enforcing visa/residence permit regulations and for processing asylum/refugee requests.
