= List of botanical gardens in Estonia =

Botanical gardens in Estonia have Estonia native and endemic species; most have a collection that include plants from around the world. There are botanical gardens and arboreta in all states and territories of Estonia. Most are administered by local governments, and some are privately owned.

- Tallinn Botanic Garden in Tallinn
- University of Tartu Botanical Gardens in Tartu
- Luua Arboretum in Luua village, Jõgeva Parish
- Söe Arboretum in Tõrve and Kassivere villages, Jõgeva Parish
- Audaku Arboretum in Viidu village, Saaremaa Parish
- Rannametsa Arboretum in Vintri Village, Saaremaa Parish
- Mihkel Rand's dendrarium in Neemi village, Saaremaa Parish
- Juhan Alas' dendrarium in Kuiste village, Saaremaa Parish
- Audru Arboretum
- Ellamaa Arboretum
- Kõnnu Dendrarium
- Loodusega Koos, Neemi village, Saaremaa
