= Estonian passport =

Travel document

Estonian passport; Eesti kodaniku pass
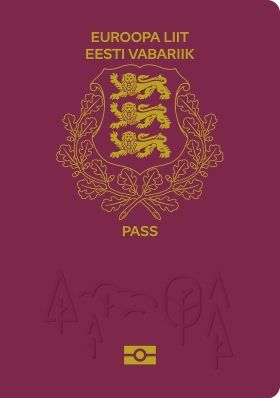
- Estonian biometric passport front cover since 2021. A forest motif is embossed above the biometric symbol.
- Type: Passport
- Issued by: (Estonia) Ministry of the Interior and Foreign Affairs
- First issued: 1991 (restoration of country's independence); 1 February 2002 (machine-readable passport); 22 May 2007 (biometric passport); 1 June 2014 (second biometric version); 2021 (current version)
- Purpose: Identification
- Eligibility: Estonian citizenship
- Expiration: 10 years after issuance
- Cost: €40 (ages 15 and up); €20 (children under 15); €60 (ages 15 and up when applying abroad); €20 (children under 15 when applying abroad)

An Estonian passport (Estonian: Eesti kodaniku pass) is an international travel document issued to citizens of Estonia, and may also serve as proof of Estonian citizenship. Besides enabling the bearer to travel internationally and serving as indication of Estonian citizenship, the passport facilitates the process of securing assistance from Estonian consular officials abroad or other European Union member states in case an Estonian consular is absent, if needed. If an Estonian citizen wishes to receive an identity document, especially an Estonian passport, somewhere other than the foreign representation of the Republic of Estonia, then the bearer of the Estonian citizenship staying abroad could receive the travel documents in embassies of any EU country worldwide by paying 50 Euro.

Every Estonian citizen is also a citizen of the European Union. The passport, along with the national identity card allows for free rights of movement and residence in any of the states of the European Union, European Economic Area and Switzerland.

An Estonian certificate of return shall be issued to an Estonian citizen staying in a foreign state whose Estonian passport becomes unusable or is destroyed or lost. An Estonian certificate of return shall be issued on the basis of a birth certificate to a child of less than one year of age who was born to a citizen of Estonia in a foreign state. An Estonian certificate of return may be issued to an Estonian citizen who has no valid Estonian document if the issue of such document is in the public interest. An Estonian certificate of return shall be issued with a period of validity of up to twelve months. Upon entry into Estonia, a certificate of return shall be returned to the Police and Border Guard Board who shall forward the certificate to the Ministry of Foreign Affairs.

A return support can be applied by ethnic Estonians and Estonian citizens who have lived outside Estonia for 10 years or more or were born in a foreign country. A return support will be paid to those who need help, if they want to settle in Estonia.

== History ==
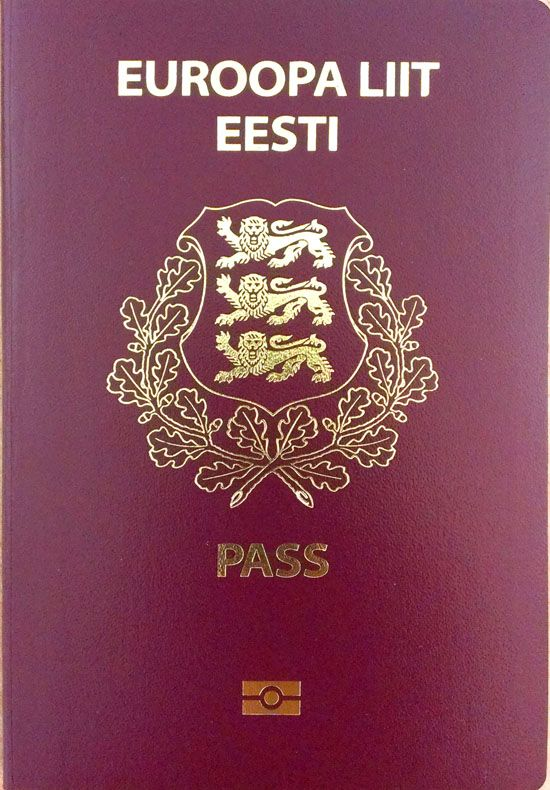
Cover of Estonian biometric passports issued from 2014 until 2021

Estonian passports were issued throughout the country's occupation in the years 1940–1991 by the Estonian consulate in New York. Passports were again issued in Estonia in 1991, shortly after the country regained its independence from the Soviet Union. A machine-readable passport type was introduced on 1 February 2002.

== Application ==
Within Estonia, the Citizenship and Migration Board (until 2010) and Police and Border Guard Board (since 2010), and overseas by Estonian foreign representations abroad are responsible for the issuing and renewing of Estonian passports.

== Physical appearance ==
In conformity with the standard European Union design, Estonian passports are burgundy, with the Estonian Coat of arms emblazoned in the centre of the front cover. The words "EUROOPA LIIT" (European Union) and "EESTI" (Estonia) are inscribed above the coat of arms and the word "PASS" (Passport) is inscribed below the coat of arms. Estonian passports have the standard biometric symbol at the bottom.

=== Identity information page ===
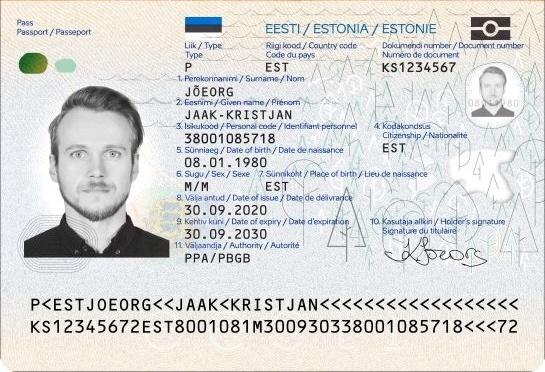
Information page of biometric machine-readable Estonian passports issued after 2021

The biodata page of an Estonian passport includes the following information:

- Photo of the passport holder
- Type (P for ordinary passports)
- Code of Issuing State (EST)
- Passport number
- 1 Surname
- 2 Given Names
- 3 Citizenship (Eesti/Est)
- 4 Date of Birth
- 5 Personal Identification No.
- 6 Sex
- 7 Place of Birth
- 8 Date of Issue
- 9 Authority
- 10 Date of Expiry
- 11 Holder's Signature

The information page ends with the Machine Readable Zone starting with P<EST.

=== Passport note ===
Estonian passports issued between February 2002 and May 2007 contain a note from the issuing state that is addressed to the authorities of all other states, identifying the bearer as a citizen of that state and requesting that he or she be allowed to pass and be treated according to international norms. The note inside Estonian passports states:

The holder of this passport is under the protection of the Republic of Estonia. The Government of the Republic of Estonia hereby requests all civil and military authorities to permit the holder of this passport to pass freely without let or hindrance and in case of need to give all lawful aid and protection.

=== Languages ===
The data page/information page is printed in Estonian, English and French.

== Visa requirements ==
Visa requirements for Estonian citizens Estonia Freedom of movement Visa free Visa issued upon arrival eVisa Visa available both on arrival or online Visa required prior to arrival

Visa requirements for Estonian citizens are administrative entry restrictions by the authorities of other states placed on citizens of Estonia. As of April 2025, Estonian citizens can visit 184 countries and territories without a visa or with a visa granted on arrival, tied with the Emirati passport and ranked 8th in the world in terms of travel freedom according to the Henley Passport Index. Estonian citizens can live and work in any country within the EU as a result of the right of free movement and residence granted in Article 21 of the EU Treaty.

Visa requirements for holders of Estonian alien's passport (for residents of Estonia who are either stateless or have undefined citizenship) are different.

== Passport types ==
For Estonian citizens, apart from ordinary passports, diplomatic and service passports are also issued for those who qualify for possession of such documents.

== Biometric passports ==
Gemalto won the contract to supply biometric passports for the Citizenship and Migration Board, delivering the first new passports in early 2007.

Possession of a biometric passport is a pre-requisite for Estonians who want to qualify for the Visa Waiver Program for travel to the United States by registering via the Electronic System for Travel Authorization.

Starting from June 2009, all applicants for an Estonian passport are required to provide their fingerprints to be stored on the biometric chip in their passports.

== See also ==
- Estonian identity card
- Estonian seafarer's discharge book
- Estonian temporary travel document
- Estonian alien's passport
- Estonian travel document for refugees
- E-residency of Estonia is a concept independent of nationality giving non-Estonian residents access to Estonian financial services.
- Estonian nationality law
- Visa requirements for Estonian citizens
- Visa requirements for Estonian non-citizens
- Passports of the European Union
- List of passports
