= Estonian travel documents =

The Police and Border Guard Board, a government agency under the Ministry of Internal Affairs in Estonia, issues a variety of travel documents to Estonian nationals and other foreign nationals living in Estonia to facilitate travel outside of Estonia.

Estonian travel documents

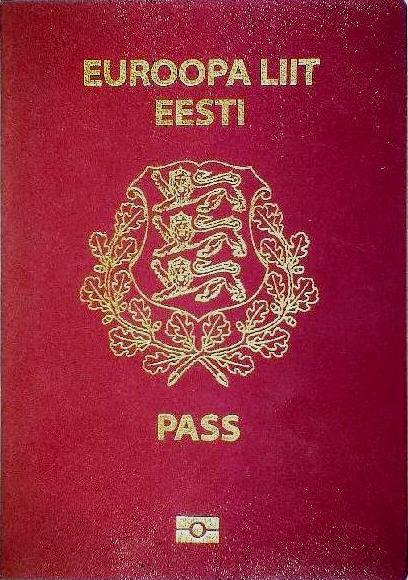
Citizen's passport

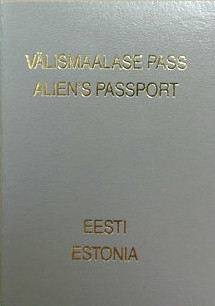
Alien's passport
