= Vanavälja =

Vanavälja may refer to several places in Estonia:

- Vanavälja, Jõgeva County, village in Jõgeva Parish, Jõgeva County
- Vanavälja, Viljandi County, village in Viljandi Parish, Viljandi County
