= Visa requirements for Estonian citizens =

Administrative entry restrictions

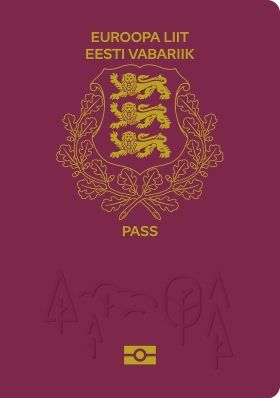
An Estonian passport

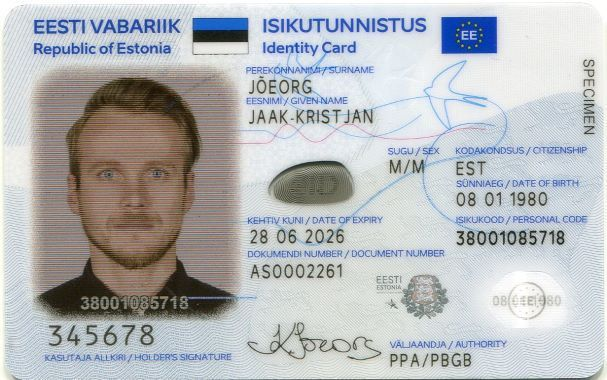
An Estonian ID card is valid for travel to most of the European countries

Visa requirements for Estonian citizens are administrative entry restrictions by the authorities of other states placed on citizens of Estonia.

As of 2026, Estonian citizens had visa-free or visa on arrival access to 181 countries and territories, ranking the Estonian passport 8th in the world according to the Henley Passport Index.

== Visa requirements map ==
Visa requirements for Estonian citizens Estonia Freedom of movement Visa free Visa issued upon arrival eVisa Visa available both on arrival or online Visa required prior to arrival

== Visa requirements ==
Country	Visa requirement	Allowed stay	Notes (excluding departure fees)
Afghanistan	eVisa	30 days	Visa is not required in case born in Afghanistan or can proof that one of their parents is a national of Afghanistan or born in Afghanistan.; e-Visa : Visitors must arrive at Kabul International (KBL).
Albania	Visa not required	90 days	ID card valid
Algeria	Visa required		Visa Issuance for passengers with a boarding authorization traveling as tourists to cities in the south of Algeria (Timimoun, Ghardaia, Ilizi, Djanet or Tamanraset) can obtain a visa on arrival for a maximum of 30 days. They must have: a return/onward ticket, a hotel reservation confirmation.
Andorra	Visa not required		ID card valid
Angola	Visa not required	30 days	International Certificate of Vaccination required
Antigua and Barbuda	Visa not required	3 months	
Argentina	Visa not required	90 days	
Armenia	Visa not required	180 days	
Australia	eVisitor	90 days	90 days on each visit in 12-month period if granted
Austria	Visa not required	Freedom of movement; ID card valid	
Azerbaijan	eVisa	30 days	
Bahamas	Visa not required	3 months	
Bahrain	eVisa / Visa on arrival	14 days	Visa is also obtainable online.
Bangladesh	Visa on arrival	30 days	
Barbados	Visa not required	3 months	
Belarus	Visa not required	30 days	Visa-free also for stateless persons permanently residing in Estonia.; Visa-free until 31 December 2025.
Belgium	Visa not required	Freedom of movement; ID card valid	
Belize	Visa not required		
Benin	eVisa	30 days	Must have an international vaccination certificate.
Bhutan	eVisa		
Bolivia	Visa not required	90 days	90 days within 180 days period
Bosnia and Herzegovina	Visa not required	90 days	90 days within any 6-month period; ID card valid
Botswana	Visa not required	90 days	
Brazil	Visa not required	90 days	90 days within any 180 day period
Brunei	Visa not required	90 days	
Bulgaria	Visa not required	Freedom of movement; ID card valid	
Burkina Faso	eVisa	1 month	
Burundi	Visa on arrival		
Cambodia	eVisa / Visa on arrival	30 days	Visa is also obtainable online.
Cameroon	eVisa		Pre-approved visa can be picked up on arrival.
Canada	eTA / Visa not required	6 months	eTA required if arriving by air.
Cape Verde	Visa not required	30 days	Must register online at least five days prior to arrival.
Central African Republic	Visa required		
Chad	Visa required		
Chile	Visa not required	90 days	
China	Visa not required		Visa-free from 30 November, 2024 to 31 December, 2026.; 240-hour (10-day) visa-free transit to a third country or region (including Hong Kong, Macau or Taiwan) using any mode of transport. Must have a confirmed onward ticket/itinerary, and enter through 1 of 64 approved ports.; During which, may freely travel within the 24 provinces permitted for visa-free transit and engage in tourism, business, and visits.; 24-hour visa-free transit to a third country or region (including Hong Kong, Macau, and Taiwan), is available at most international airports, without leaving the airport.; Travellers who need to leave the airport may obtain a temporary entry permit from immigration.; 5-day port visa (Visa on Arrival) for Shenzhen if arriving at designated ports of entry from Hong Kong by land or sea, for stays within Shenzhen.; 3-day port visa (Visa on Arrival) if arriving in Zhuhai or Xiamen at designated ports of entry, for stays within the respective city.; 15-day visa-free entry for cruise ship passengers in tour groups, if arriving at any cruise port along China's coastline, including but not limited to Tianjin; Dalian; Shanghai; Lianyungang; Wenzhou; Zhoushan; Xiamen; Qingdao; Guangzhou; Shenzhen; Beihai; Haikou; Sanya. May further travel inland to all regions of coastal provinces (and equivalents) and Beijing.; May apply for a port visa (Visa on Arrival) if travelling for an urgent, qualified reason. Prior clearance for port visa is highly recommended or may be denied boarding by airlines.
Colombia	Visa not required	90 days	Extendable up to 180-days stay within a one-year period
Comoros	Visa on arrival		
Republic of the Congo	Visa required		
Democratic Republic of the Congo	eVisa	7 days	
Costa Rica	Visa not required	90 days	
Côte d'Ivoire	eVisa		
Croatia	Visa not required	Freedom of movement; ID card valid	
Cuba	eVisa/Tourist Card required	90 days	
Cyprus	Visa not required	Freedom of movement; ID card valid	
Czech Republic	Visa not required	Freedom of movement; ID card valid	
Denmark	Visa not required	Freedom of movement (DK); ID card valid	
Djibouti	eVisa	31 days	
Dominica	Visa not required	6 months	
Dominican Republic	Visa not required	90 days	
Ecuador	Visa not required	90 days	
Egypt	eVisa / Visa on arrival	30 days	
El Salvador	Visa not required	6 months	
Equatorial Guinea	eVisa		Must arrive via Malabo International Airport
Eritrea	Visa required		
Eswatini	Visa not required	30 days	
Ethiopia	eVisa	up to 90 days	eVisa holders must arrive via Addis Ababa Bole International Airport
Fiji	Visa not required	4 months	
Finland	Visa not required	Freedom of movement; ID card valid	
France	Visa not required	Freedom of movement (in Regions of France); ID card valid	
Gabon	eVisa	90 days	Electronic visa holders must arrive via Libreville International Airport.
Gambia	Visa not required	90 days	
Georgia	Visa not required	1 year	ID card valid
Germany	Visa not required	Freedom of movement; ID card valid	
Ghana	Visa required		
Greece	Visa not required	Freedom of movement; ID card valid	
Grenada	Visa not required	3 months	
Guatemala	Visa not required	90 days	
Guinea	eVisa	90 days	
Guinea-Bissau	eVisa / Visa on arrival	90 days	
Guyana	Visa required		
Haiti	Visa not required	90 days	
Honduras	Visa not required	3 months	
Hungary	Visa not required	Freedom of movement; ID card valid	
Iceland	Visa not required	Freedom of movement; ID card valid	
India	e-Visa	60 days	e-Visa holders must arrive via 32 designated airports (Note: Ahmedabad; Amritsar; Bagdogra; Bengaluru; Bhubaneswar; Chandigarh; Chennai; Coimbatore; Delhi; Gaya; Goa-Dabolim; Goa-Manohar; Guwahati; Hyderabad; Indore; Jaipur; Kannur; Kochi; Kolkata; Kozhikode; Lucknow; Madurai; Mangaluru; Mumbai; Nagpur; Port Blair; Pune; Surat; Thiruvananthapuram; Tiruchirappalli; Varanasi; Visakhapatnam) or 5 designated seaports. (Note: Chennai; Cochin; Mormugao (Goa); Mumbai; Mangalore); An Indian e-Tourist Visa may only be obtained twice within 1 calendar year.; Foreigners of Pakistani origin or who hold a Pakistani Passport are not eligible for an e-Visa. Foreigners who are not Pakistani nationals, but whose parents or grandparents (either paternal or maternal) were born in, or were permanent residents in Pakistan, are also not eligible for an e-Visa.
Indonesia	e-VOA / Visa on arrival	30 days	
Iran	eVisa	30 days	
Iraq	eVisa	60 days	Visa on arrival for 15 days at Erbil and Sulaymaniyah airports.
Ireland	Visa not required	Freedom of movement; ID card valid	
Israel	Electronic Travel Authorization	3 months	
Italy	Visa not required	Freedom of movement; ID card valid	
Jamaica	Visa on arrival	30 days	visa free if hold a vaccination certificate for Measles, Polio and Rubella only
Japan	Visa not required	90 days	
Jordan	eVisa/Visa on arrival	30 days	Conditions apply.
Kazakhstan	Visa not required	30 days	
Kenya	Electronic Travel Authorisation	3 months	Electronic Travel Authorisation (eTA); Applications can be submitted up to 90 days prior to travel and must be submitted at least 3 days in advance.; eTA fee is 32.50 USD.; Proof of reservation at the hotel where visitors plan to stay is required (if staying with friends, an invitation letter is also acceptable).; Yellow fever vaccination certificate is required if coming from endemic countries.; Can also be entered on an East Africa tourist visa issued by Rwanda or Uganda.
Kiribati	Visa not required	90 days	90 days within any 180 day period
North Korea	Visa required		
South Korea	Korean Electronic Travel Authorization	90 days	
Kuwait	eVisa / Visa on arrival	3 months	
Kyrgyzstan	Visa not required	60 days	
Laos	eVisa / Visa on arrival	30 days	18 (Note: Savannakhet Airport; Lanetoui - Mengkang (China); Meuangmom - Wan Pong (Myanmar); Banvang - Ban Khok Phai (Thailand); Namngeun - Huay Kon (Thailand); Paksan - Bueng Kan (Thailand); Paktaphan - Pak Saeng (Thailand); Pangmon - Ban Huak (Thailand); Phoudou (Thailand); Dak ta ock - Nam Giang (Vietnam); La Lai (Vietnam); Namkan (Vietnam); Namphao - Cau Treo (Vietnam); Namsoy - Na Meo (Vietnam); Naphao - Cha Lo (Vietnam); Pahang - Long Sap (Vietnam); Panghok - Tây Trang (Vietnam); Phoukeua - Bo Y (Vietnam)) of the 33 border crossings are only open to regular visa holders.; e-Visa may be used to enter Laos through the Luang Prabang, Pakse and Vientiane international airports, 3 Thai-Lao Friendship Bridges (Note: Vientiane (Friendship Bridge 1); Savannakhet (Friendship Bridge 2); Bokeo (Friendship Bridge 4)), in Boten (road and railroad), and in Vientiane (at Khamsavath railway station).; Visa on arrival is available at the Luang Prabang, Pakse and Vientiane international airports, 4 Thai-Lao Friendship Bridges (Note: Vientiane (Friendship Bridge 1); Savannakhet (Friendship Bridge 2); Khammouane (Friendship Bridge 3); Bokeo (Friendship Bridge 4)) and 7 border crossings. (Note: Nongnokkheane - Trapeang Kriel (Cambodia); Boten - Bo han (China); Golden Triangle/Samliemkham (Thailand); Khamsavath railway station (Thailand); Namheuang - Ban Na Kraseng (Thailand); Vang tao - Chongmek (Thailand); Dansavan - Lao Bảo (Vietnam))
Latvia	Visa not required	Freedom of movement; ID card valid	
Lebanon	Visa on arrival	1 month	Extendable for 2 additional months; Granted free of charge at Beirut International Airport or any other port of entry if there is no Israeli visa or seal, holding a telephone number, an address in Lebanon, and a non refundable return or circle trip ticket.
Lesotho	eVisa		44 days for single entry, up to 180 days for multiple entries
Liberia	e-VOA		Travelers can pre-apply for the visa online through a dedicated portal allows them to obtain a Visa upon arrival in Liberia if there is no embassy in their home country. But if there is a Liberian embassy in your country, you are required to apply for your visa directly at the embassy and not through this portal.; Currently available only upon arrival at Roberts International Airport (ROB) in Monrovia.
Libya	eVisa		
Liechtenstein	Visa not required	Freedom of movement; ID card valid	
Lithuania	Visa not required	Freedom of movement; ID card valid	
Luxembourg	Visa not required	Freedom of movement; ID card valid	
Madagascar	eVisa / Visa on arrival	90 days	
Malawi	eVisa / Visa on arrival		
Malaysia	Visa not required	90 days	
Maldives	Visa on arrival	30 days	
Mali	Visa required		
Malta	Visa not required	Freedom of movement; ID card valid	
Marshall Islands	Visa not required	90 days	90 days within any 180 day period
Mauritania	eVisa		Available at Nouakchott–Oumtounsy International Airport.
Mauritius	Visa not required	90 days	
Mexico	Visa not required	180 days	
Micronesia	Visa not required	90 days	90 days within any 180 day period
Moldova	Visa not required	90 days	90 days within any 180 day period
Monaco	Visa not required		ID card valid
Mongolia	Visa not required	30 days	
Montenegro	Visa not required	90 days	ID card valid for 30 days
Morocco	Visa not required	90 days	
Mozambique	eVisa/Visa on arrival	30 days	
Myanmar	eVisa	28 days	eVisa holders must arrive via Yangon, Nay Pyi Taw or Mandalay airports or via land border crossings with Thailand — Tachileik, Myawaddy and Kawthaung or India — Rih Khaw Dar and Tamu.; eVisa available for both tourism (allowed stay is 28 days) or business (allowed stay is 70 days) purposes.
Namibia	eVisa/Visa on arrival	90 days	
Nauru	Visa required		
Nepal	eVisa/Visa on arrival	90 days	
Netherlands	Visa not required	Freedom of movement (European Netherlands); ID card valid	
New Zealand	Electronic Travel Authority	3 months	Holders of an Estonian non-citizen passport require a visa.; Diplomatic, service and standard passports with the former USSR symbol issued in Estonia are unacceptable, and visas will not be endorsed in them.; International Visitor Conservation and Tourism Levy must be paid upon requesting an Electronic Travel Authority.; Holders of an Australian Permanent Resident Visa or Resident Return Visa may be granted a New Zealand Resident Visa on arrival permitting indefinite stay (pursuant to the Trans-Tasman Travel Arrangement), subject to meeting character requirements and obtaining an Electronic Travel Authority prior to departure. Such travellers are not required to pay the International Visitor Conservation and Tourism Levy.
Nicaragua	Visa required		
Niger	Visa required		
Nigeria	eVisa	90 days	Holders of written e-Visa approval issued by the Immigration Authority can obtain a visa on arrival, provided they hold a visa application form and e-Visa application payment receipt and have an invitation letter from a Nigerian company accepting immigration responsibilities.
North Macedonia	Visa not required	90 days	ID card valid
Norway	Visa not required	Freedom of movement; ID card valid	
Oman	visa not required	14 days	30 days eVisa free also available
Pakistan	Online Visa		Online Visa eligible.; Electronic Travel Authorization to obtain a visa on arrival for business purposes.
Palau	Visa not required	90 days	90 days within any 180 day period
Panama	Visa not required	180 days	
Papua New Guinea	eVisa	60 days	
Paraguay	Visa not required	90 days	
Peru	Visa not required	90 days	90 days within any 6-month period
Philippines	Visa not required	30 days	
Poland	Visa not required	Freedom of movement; ID card valid	
Portugal	Visa not required	Freedom of movement; ID card valid	
Qatar	Visa not required	90 days	Available at Hamad International Airport.; eVisa is also available.
Romania	Visa not required	Freedom of movement; ID card valid	
Russia	eVisa	30 days	e-Visa holders must arrive and departure via 29 checkpoints; 72-hours visa free visit when entering by regular ferry via port of St. Petersburg, provided that a passenger spends the night on-board or in accommodation specifically approved by the travel agency.
Rwanda	eVisa / Visa on arrival	30 days	
Saint Kitts and Nevis	Electronic Travel Authorisation	3 months	
Saint Lucia	Visa not required	90 days	90 days within any 180 day period
Saint Vincent and the Grenadines	Visa not required	90 days	90 days within any 180 day period
Samoa	Visa not required	90 days	90 days within any 180 day period
San Marino	Visa not required		ID card valid
São Tomé and Príncipe	Visa not required	15 days	
Saudi Arabia	eVisa / Visa on arrival	90 days	
Senegal	Visa not required	90 days	
Serbia	Visa not required	90 days	90 days within any 6-month period; ID card valid
Seychelles	Visa not required	3 months	
Sierra Leone	eVisa/Visa on arrival		
Singapore	Visa not required	90 days	
Slovakia	Visa not required	Freedom of movement; ID card valid	
Slovenia	Visa not required	Freedom of movement; ID card valid	
Solomon Islands	Visa not required	90 days	90 days within any 180 day period
Somalia	eVisa		Available at Berbera, Borama, Burao, Erigavo and Hargeisa airports.; 30 days, available at Bosaso Airport, Galcaio Airport and Mogadishu Airport.
South Africa	Visa not required	90 days	
South Sudan	Electronic Visa		Obtainable online; Printed visa authorization must be presented at the time of travel
Spain	Visa not required	Freedom of movement; ID card valid	
Sri Lanka	eVisa / Visa on arrival	30 days	
Sudan	Visa required		
Suriname	E-tourist card	90 days	Multiple entry eVisa is also available.
Sweden	Visa not required	Freedom of movement; ID card valid	
Switzerland	Visa not required	Freedom of movement; ID card valid	
Syria	eVisa		
Tajikistan	Visa not required	30 days	
Tanzania	eVisa / Visa on arrival	3 months	
Thailand	Visa not required	60 days	
Timor-Leste	Visa not required	90 days	90 days within any 180 day period
Togo	Visa on arrival	15 days	
Tonga	Visa not required	90 days	90 days within any 180 day period
Trinidad and Tobago	Visa not required	90 days	90 days within any 180 day period
Tunisia	Visa not required	3 months	ID card valid on organized tours
Turkey	Visa not required	3 months	
Turkmenistan	Visa required		Pre-approved visa can be picked up on arrival.
Tuvalu	Visa not required	90 days	
Uganda	eVisa / Visa on arrival		May apply online.
Ukraine	Visa not required	90 days	90 days within any 180 day period
United Arab Emirates	Visa not required	90 days	90 days within any 180 day period
United Kingdom	Electronic Travel Authorisation	6 months	
United States	Visa Waiver Program	90 days	Since 1 October 2022, ESTA is now required for any entry by air, cruise ship, and land
Uruguay	Visa not required	90 days	
Uzbekistan	Visa not required	30 days	
Vanuatu	Visa not required	90 days	90 days within any 180 day period
Vatican City	Visa not required		ID card valid
Venezuela	Visa not required	90 days	
Vietnam	eVisa	90 days	Phú Quốc without a visa for up to 30 days.
Yemen	Visa required		
Zambia	Visa not required	90 days	
Zimbabwe	eVisa / Visa on arrival	3 months	

== Territories and disputed areas ==
Visa requirements for Estonian citizens for visits to various territories, disputed areas, partially recognized countries and restricted zones:

Europe

- Abkhazia — Visa required.
- Mount Athos — Special permit required (4 days: 25 euro for Orthodox visitors, 35 euro for non-Orthodox visitors, 18 euro for students). There is a visitors' quota: maximum 100 Orthodox and 10 non-Orthodox per day and women are not allowed.
- (Belarus) Brest and Grodno — Visa not required for 10 days.
- (Autonomous Republic of Crimea) Crimea — Visa issued by Russia is required.
- Turkish Republic of Northern Cyprus — Visa free access for 3 months. A valid EU passport or national identity card is required.
- (United Nations) UN Buffer Zone in Cyprus — Access Permit is required for travelling inside the zone, except Civil Use Areas.
- Faroe Islands — Visa not required.
- Gibraltar — Visa not required.
- Guernsey – Visa not required.
- (Guernsey) Alderney – Visa not required.
- (Guernsey) Sark – Visa not required.
- Isle of Man — Visa not required.
- (Norway) Jan Mayen — permit issued by the local police required for staying for less than 24 hours and permit issued by the Norwegian police for staying for more than 24 hours.
- Jersey – Visa not required.
- Kaliningrad Oblast — From 1 July 2019, Estonian citizens are eligible for E-visa access for 8 days.
- Kosovo — visa free for 90 days.
- Closed cities and regions in Russia — special authorization required.
- South Ossetia — Visa free. Multiple entry visa to Russia and three-day prior notification are required to enter South Ossetia.
- Transnistria — Visa free. Registration required after 24h.

Africa

- Eritrea (outside Asmara) — visa covers Asmara only; to travel in the rest of the country, a Travel Permit for Foreigners is required (20 Eritrean nakfa).
- Sahrawi Arab Democratic Republic (Western Sahara controlled territory) — Visa not required up to 3 months.
- Somaliland — Visa issued on arrival (30 days for 30 US dollars, payable on arrival).
- Sudan — All foreigners traveling more than 25 kilometers outside of Khartoum must obtain a travel permit.
- (Sudan) Darfur — Separate travel permit is required.
- Réunion — Visa not required. ID card valid.
- Mayotte — Visa not required. ID card valid.
- Canary Islands — Visa not required. ID card valid.
- Ceuta — Visa not required. ID card valid.
- Melilla — Visa not required. ID card valid.

Asia

- Hong Kong — Visa not required for 90 days.
- India — Protected Area Permit (PAP) required for whole states of Nagaland and Sikkim and parts of states Manipur, Arunachal Pradesh, Uttaranchal, Jammu and Kashmir, Rajasthan, Himachal Pradesh. Restricted Area Permit (RAP) required for all of Andaman and Nicobar Islands and parts of Sikkim. Some of these requirements are occasionally lifted for a year.
- Iraqi Kurdistan — Visa on arrival for 15 days is available at Erbil and Sulaymaniyah airports.
- Kazakhstan — Special permission required for the town of Baikonur and surrounding areas in Kyzylorda Oblast, and the town of Gvardeyskiy near Almaty.
- (Iran) Kish Island — Visitors to Kish Island do not require a visa.
- Macao — Visa not required for 90 days.
- (Malaysia) Sabah and Sarawak — These states have their own immigration authorities and passport is required to travel to them, however the same visa applies.
- Maldives — With the exception of the capital Malé, tourists are generally prohibited from visiting non-resort islands without the express permission of the Government of Maldives.
- North Korea outside Pyongyang – People are not allowed to leave the capital city, tourists can only leave the capital with a governmental tourist guide (no independent moving)
- Palestine — Visa not required. Arrival by sea to Gaza Strip not allowed.
- Taiwan — Visa not required for 90 days.
- (Tajikistan) Gorno-Badakhshan Autonomous Province — OIVR permit required (15+5 Tajikistani Somoni) and another special permit (free of charge) is required for Lake Sarez.
- Turkmenistan — A special permit, issued prior to arrival by Ministry of Foreign Affairs, is required if visiting the following places: Atamurat, Cheleken, Dashoguz, Serakhs and Serhetabat.
- (China) Tibet Autonomous Region — Tibet Travel Permit required (10 US Dollars).
- (United Nations) Korean Demilitarized Zone — restricted zone.
- (United Nations) UNDOF Zone and Ghajar — restricted zones.
- (Vietnam) Phú Quốc — can visit without a visa for up to 30 days.
- Yemen — Special permission needed for travel outside Sanaa or Aden.

Caribbean and North Atlantic and South America

- Anguilla — Visa not required for 3 months.
- Aruba — Visa not required for 30 days.
- Azores — Visa not required. ID card valid.
- (Netherlands) Bonaire, St. Eustatius and Saba — Visa not required for 3 months.
- Bermuda — Visa not required for 21 days (extendable).
- British Virgin Islands — Visa not required for 1 month (extendable).
- Cayman Islands — Visa not required for 6 months.
- Colombia — Visitors arriving at San Andrés and Leticia must buy tourist cards on arrival.
- Curacao — Visa not required for 3 months.
- Guadeloupe — Visa not required. ID card valid.
- Greenland — Visa not required.
- French Guiana— Visa not required ID card valid.
- Madeira — Visa not required. ID card valid.
- Montserrat — Visa not required for 6 months.
- (Venezuela) Margarita Island — All visitors are fingerprinted.
- Martinique — Visa not required. ID card valid.
- Puerto Rico — Visa not required under the Visa Waiver Program, for 90 days on arrival from overseas for 2 years. ESTA required.
- Saint Barthélemy — Visa not required. ID card valid.
- Saint Pierre and Miquelon — Visa not required. ID card valid.
- Collectivity of Saint Martin — Visa not required. ID card valid.
- Sint Maarten — Visa not required for 3 months.
- Turks and Caicos Islands — Visa not required for 90 days.
- U.S. Virgin Islands — Visa not required under the Visa Waiver Program, for 90 days on arrival from overseas for 2 years. ESTA required.

Oceania

- American Samoa — Electronic authorization for 30 days.
- (Australia) Ashmore and Cartier Islands — special authorisation required.
- (France) Clipperton Island — special permit required.
- Cook Islands — Visa free access for 31 days.
- (Fiji) Lau Province — Special permission required.
- French Polynesia — Visa not required. ID card valid.
- Guam — Visa not required under the Visa Waiver Program, for 90 days on arrival from overseas for 2 years. ESTA required.
- New Caledonia — Visa not required. ID card valid.
- Niue — Visa on arrival valid for 30 days is issued free of charge.
- Northern Mariana Islands — Visa not required.
- Pitcairn Islands — 14 days visa free and landing fee US$35 or tax of US$5 if not going ashore.
- Tokelau — Entry permit required.
- United States Minor Outlying Islands — special permits required for Baker Island, Howland Island, Jarvis Island, Johnston Atoll, Kingman Reef, Midway Atoll, Palmyra Atoll and Wake Island.
- Wallis and Futuna — Visa not required. ID card valid.

South Atlantic and Antarctica

- Falkland Islands — Visitor Permit valid for 4 weeks is issued on arriva.
- Saint Helena, Ascension and Tristan da Cunha
  - Ascension Island — eVisa for 3 months within any year period.
  - Saint Helena — Entry Permit (£25) for 183 days is issued on arrival.
  - Tristan da Cunha — Permission to land required for 15/30 pounds sterling (yacht/ship passenger) for Tristan da Cunha Island or 20 pounds sterling for Gough Island, Inaccessible Island or Nightingale Islands.
- South Georgia and the South Sandwich Islands — Pre-arrival permit from the Commissioner required (72 hours/1 month for 110/160 pounds sterling).
- Antarctica and adjacent islands — special permits required for French Southern and Antarctic Lands, Argentine Antarctica, (Australia) Australian Antarctic Territory, (Antártica Chilena Province) Chilean Antarctic Territory, (Australia) Heard Island and McDonald Islands, (Norway) Peter I Island, (Norway) Queen Maud Land, (New Zealand) Ross Dependency.
- Arab League — Certain countries will deny access to holders of Israeli visas or passport stamps of Israel because of the Arab League boycott of Israel.

== Non-ordinary passports ==
Holders of various categories of official Estonian passports have additional visa-free access to the following countries - Azerbaijan (diplomatic passports), Bangladesh (diplomatic or official passports), Kazakhstan (diplomatic passports) and Russia (diplomatic passports). Holders of diplomatic or service passports of any country have visa-free access to Cape Verde, Ethiopia, Mali and Zimbabwe.

== Right to consular protection in non-EU countries ==
When in a non-EU country where there is no Estonian embassy, Estonian citizens as EU citizens have the right to get consular protection from the embassy of any other EU country present in that country.

See also List of diplomatic missions of Estonia.

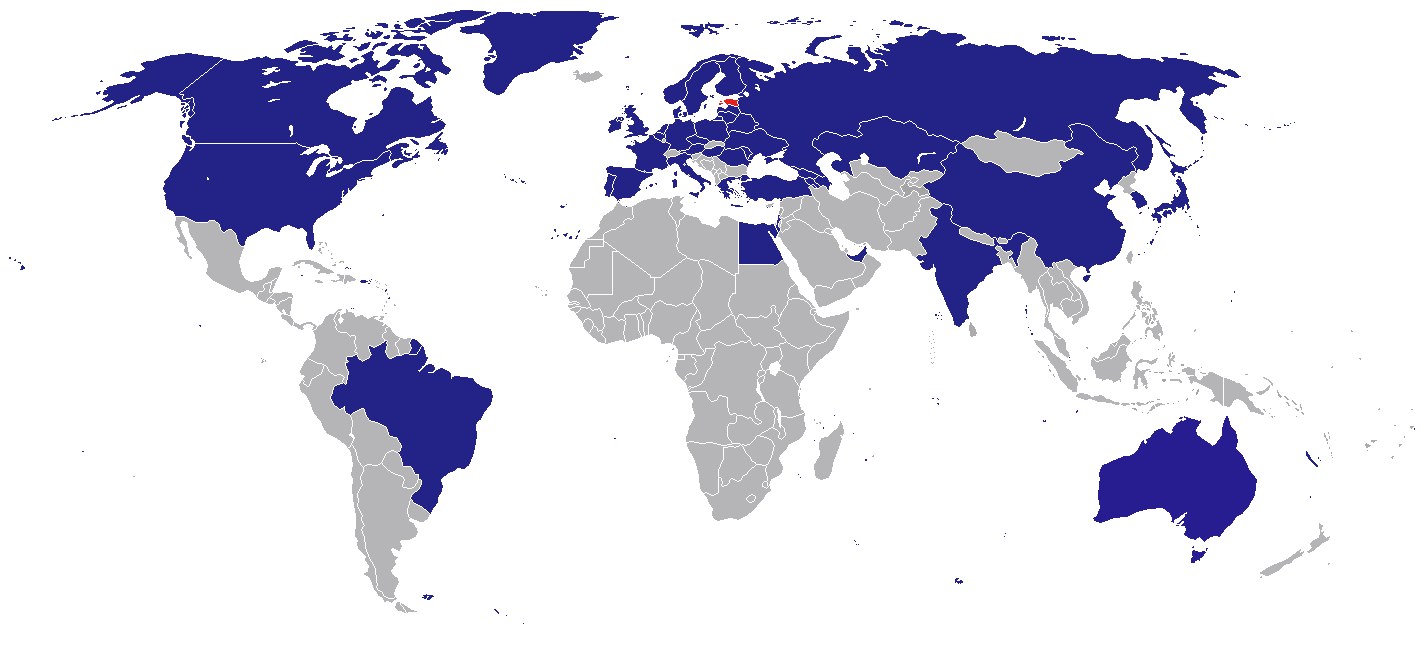
Diplomatic missions of Estonia

== See also ==
- Visa requirements for the European Union citizens
- Visa requirements for Estonian non-citizens
