= Sudiste =

Sudiste may refer to several places in Estonia:

- Sudiste, Jõgeva County, village in Jõgeva Parish, Jõgeva County
- Sudiste, Viljandi County, village in Mulgi Parish, Viljandi County
