= Harri Moora =

Estonian archaeologist (1900–1968)

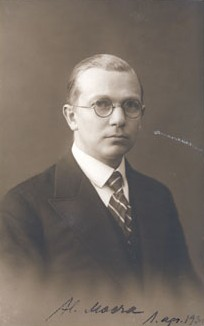
Harri Moora in 1930

Harri Moora (2 March [O.S. 18 February] 1900 in Ehavere, Kuremaa Parish – 2 May 1968 in Tallinn, Soviet union) was an Estonian archaeologist. He was a recipient of the national Cross of Liberty.

== Life ==
In 1925, he graduated from the University of Tartu. Between 1930–1942, he was a museum director. In 1931, he studied at Baltic Institute in Stockholm and developed a scholarly working relationship with Finnish archaeologist Ella Kivikoski, who was one of his main contacts with Scandinavian archaeologists.

He worked at Tartu University during World War II but was arrested in 1944; he resumed his post at the university after the war. He worked at the Institute of History and Archaeology as the department head until his death.

From 1936 to 1950, he was Chairman of the Estonian Learned Society and a member of the International Union of the History of Science.

He was married to Aliise Moora, an ethnologist, and they had six children, two of whom became well known academics. Tanel Moora became an archaeologist and Ann Marksoo a geographer. Harri Moora's grandsons are politician Jürgen Ligi and archeologist Priit Ligi.

After Moora's death, two other Estonian archaeologists, Lembit Jaanits and Jüri Selirand co-authored a book in his memory, Studia archaeologica in memoriam Harri Moora, published in 1970.
