= Luua =

Village in Estonia

- Village
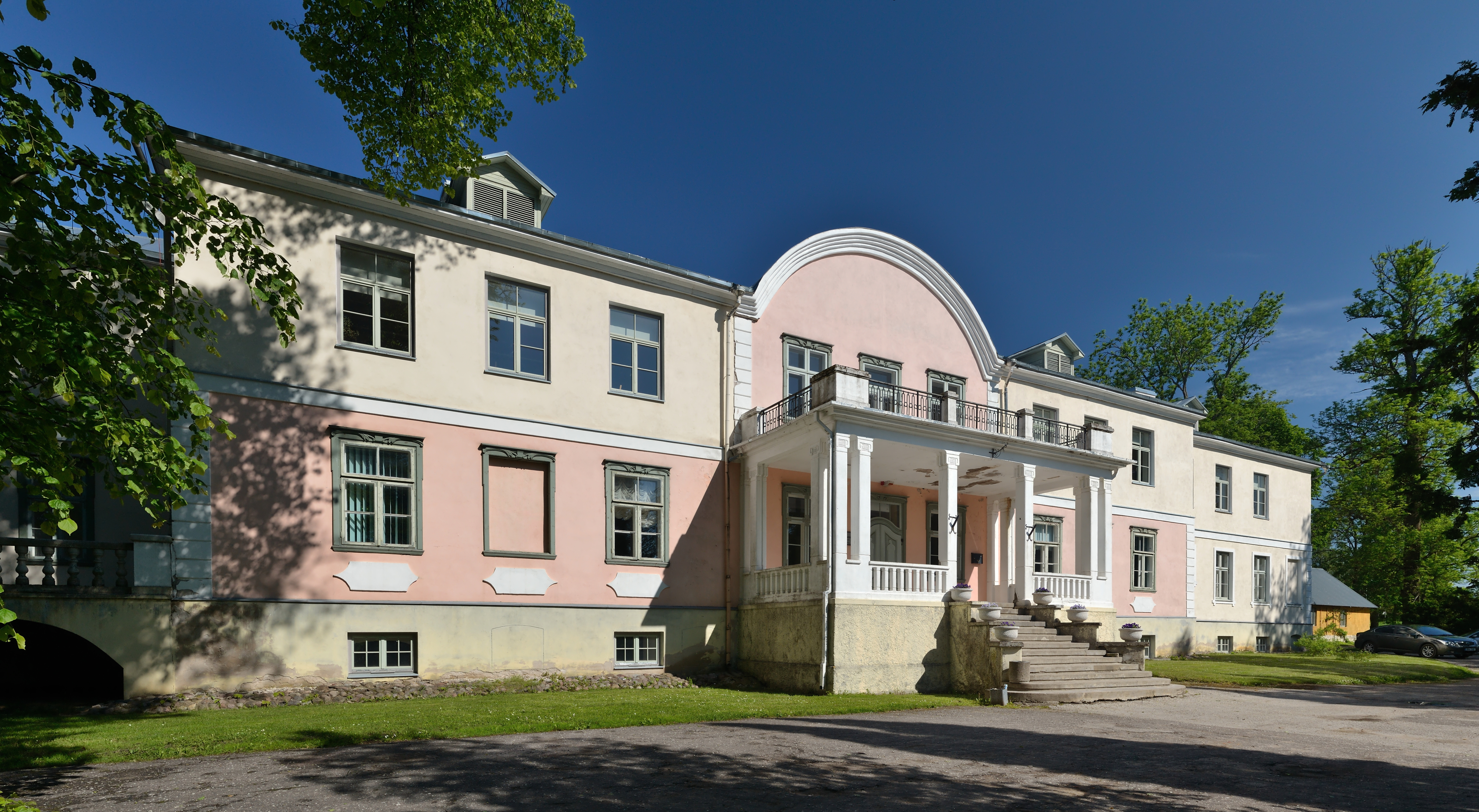
- Luua manor

- Location in Estonia
- Coordinates: 58°39′15″N 26°41′56″E
- Country: Estonia
- County: Jõgeva County
- Parish: Jõgeva Parish

Population (2020)
  - Total: 282
- Time zone: UTC+2 (EET)
  - Summer (DST): UTC+3 (EEST)

Luua (until 1920: Ludenhof) is a village in Jõgeva Parish, Jõgeva County in eastern Estonia.

== Luua Manor ==
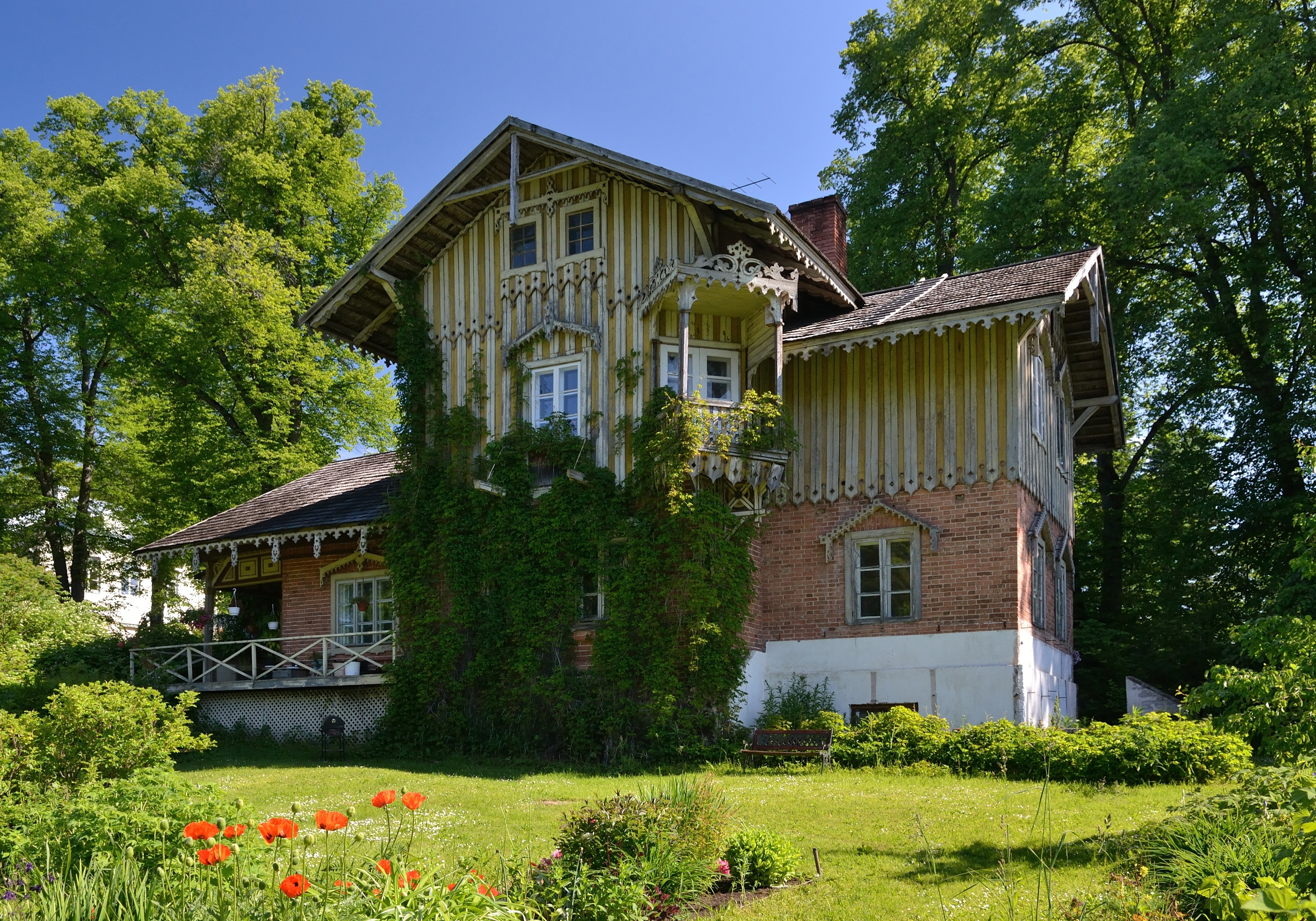
The "cavaliers' house" by Luua manor.

Luua Manor (German: Ludenhof) has a history that goes back to at least 1519, when it was owned by Jürgen von Lude, whose family name is the source of the name of the estate. Subsequently it has belonged to several aristocratic families. In 1682 the Swedish crown assumed control of the estate through one of the so-called reductions, but later it was again in the hands of the aristocracy. The current building is originally from the 1730s but has been heavily rebuilt at various times since. The manor is surrounded by a park, originally designed by Walter von Engelhardt. A splendidly decorated "cavaliers' house", rich in carved wood ornamentation, also belongs to the estate.

The manor is now a professional school.

Physicist and music theorist Arthur von Oettingen (1836–1920) was born in Luua Manor.

== Luua Arboretum ==
Luua Arboretum is located in Luua and covers an area of 8.5 hectares (21 acres).
