= Visa requirements for Estonian non-citizens =

Administrative entry restrictions

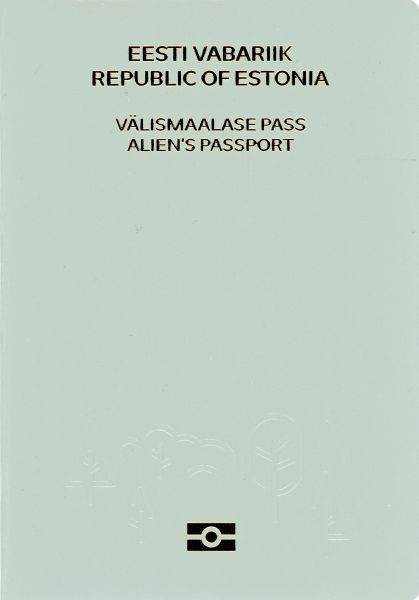
Estonian alien's passport

Visa requirements for Estonian non-citizens are administrative entry restrictions by the authorities of other states placed on holders of an Estonian alien's passport.

== Visa requirements map ==
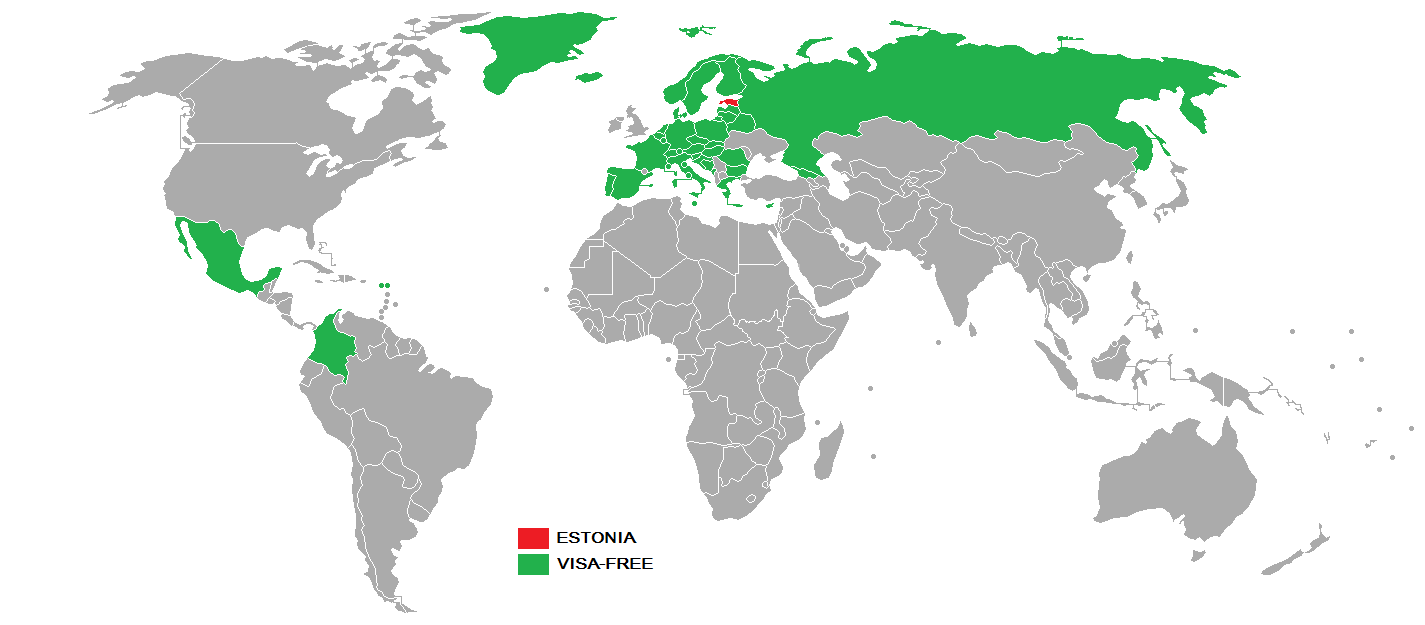
Visa requirements for Estonian non-citizens

== Visa-free access ==
Non-citizens of Estonia may enter the following countries and territories without a visa:

- (European Union) Schengen Area countries (90 days within 180 days)
- Aruba (30 days)
- Belarus 30 days, must arrive via Minsk International Airport
- Bosnia and Herzegovina (90 days within 180 days)
- Caribbean Netherlands (30 days)
- Colombia (90 days within 360 days)
- Curacao (30 days)
- Cyprus (90 days within 180 days)
- Ecuador (90 days within 180 days)
- Georgia (1 year; ID card valid)
- Mexico (180 days within 360 days)
- Montenegro (30 days)
- Sint Maarten (30 days)
- Russia (90 days within a calendar year)

== See also ==
- Visa requirements for Estonian citizens
- Visa requirements for Latvian non-citizens
- Estonian alien's passport
- U.S. Passport indicating non-citizen nationals, who usually are American Samoans
