= Forestry in Estonia =

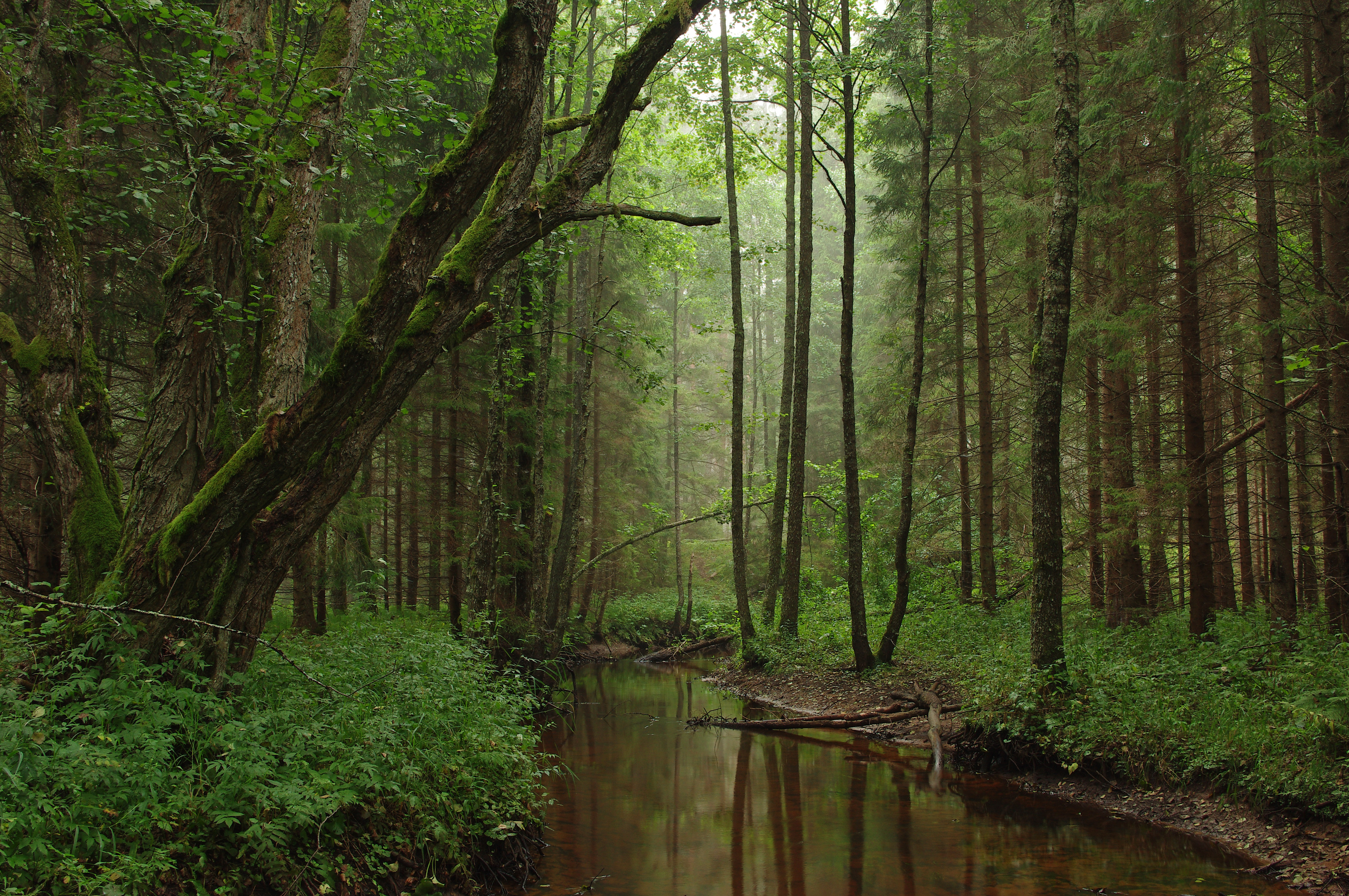
Wooded landscape in Estonia.

Forests cover about 50% of the territory of Estonia, or around 2 million hectares, and so make out an important and dominating landscape type in the country. National law and policies recognize that forests are a natural and ecological resource, and the importance of forests is to be considered from an economic, social, ecological and cultural aspect.

== Overview ==
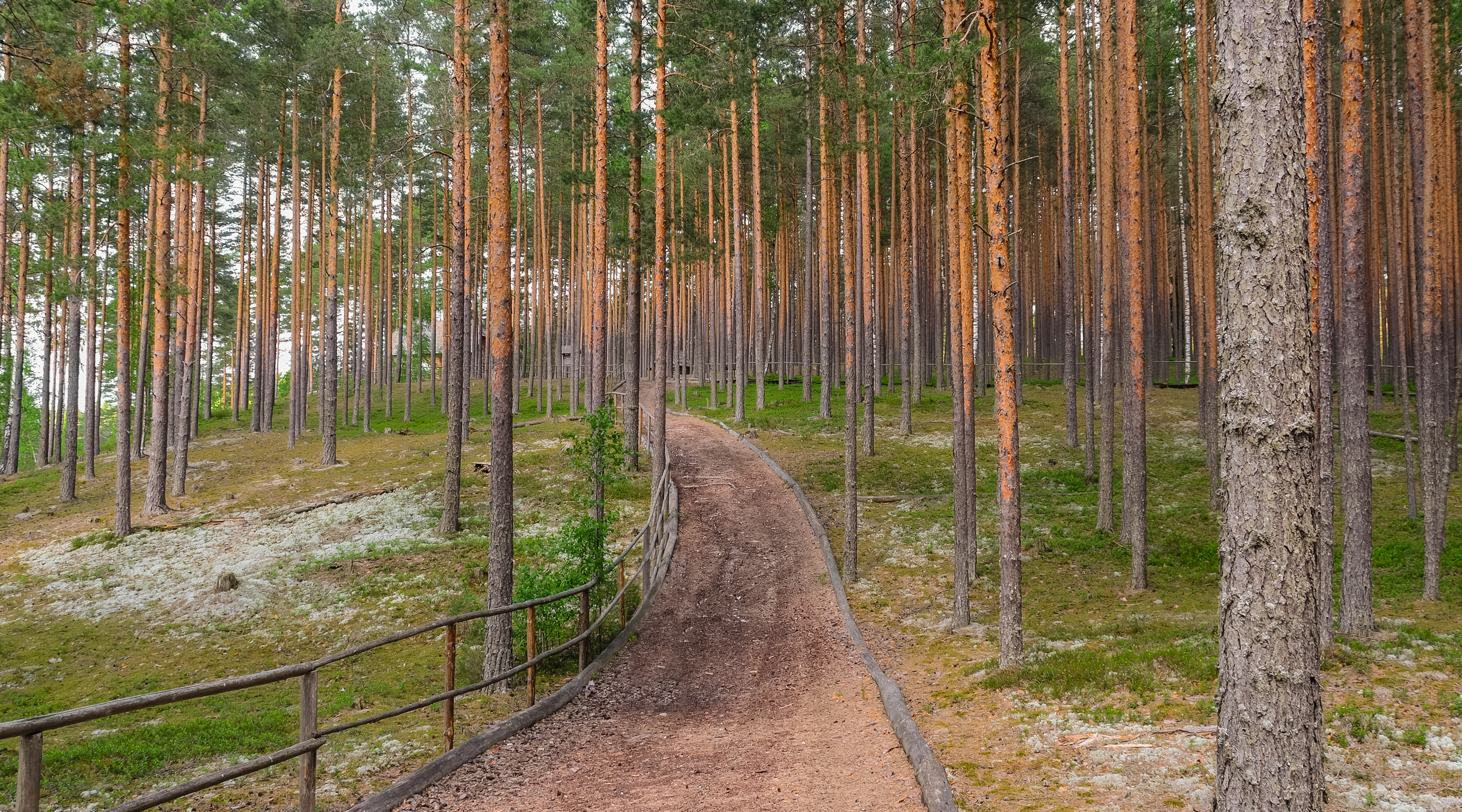
Scots pine forest in South-Estonia.

=== History ===
Before the advent of agriculture in Estonia, the land area covered by forests was approximately 80%; however, due to human activity it fell to about 34% by 1939, and Estonia has traditionally been a country dominated by agriculture. However, after World War II and the ensuing Soviet occupation of Estonia, large parts of former agricultural land fell into disuse and was reforested. In the 1960s, attempts were made to improve the output of silviculture by e.g. draining swamps. Agricultural reforms during the 1990s have further increased the amount of land with forests growing.

=== Forest types ===
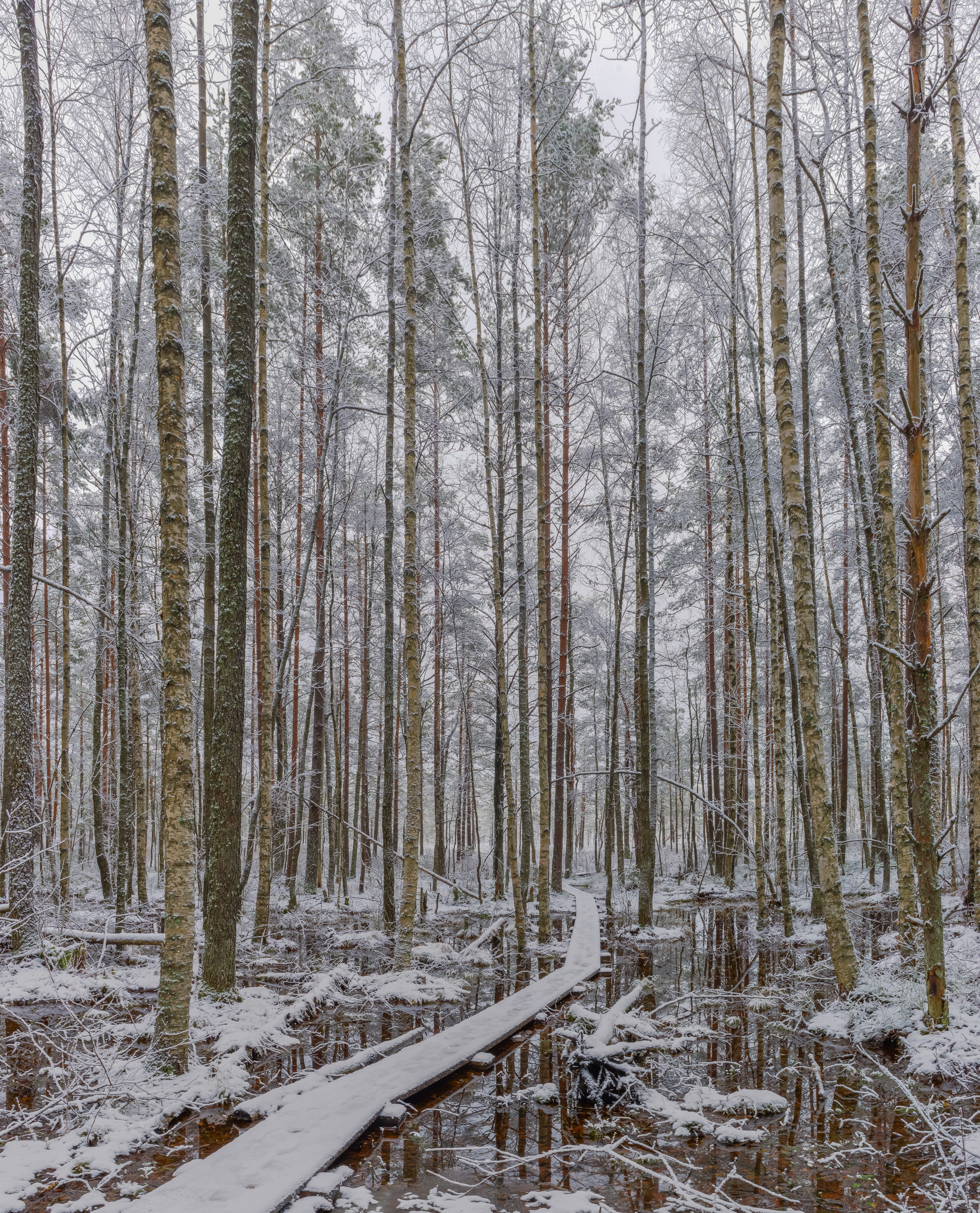
Swamp forest in winter.

Despite its relatively small size, Estonia displays a great variety in forest types. Two main types are forests growing on mineral soil (about 70%) and so-called swamp forests (about 30%), growing in the numerous wetland areas of Estonia. The forest types can further be broken down into smaller categories, many with their own ecosystem and unique biotope. In addition, large variations can be found within a single small area of land. The most common tree species are pine, birch and spruce.

== Forestry management ==
About 70% of Estonian forests are commercially used (circa 1.5 million hectares), with another 30% enjoying some kind of protection (as of 2005).

=== Commercial use ===
Of harvested timber, around 60% is made up of coniferous wood, mainly pine and spruce, and the rest deciduous trees, dominated by birch. The forest-based industry of Estonia encompasses all aspects of the trade; however, the pulp and paper industry remains relatively small. Round wood is exported mainly to Finland and Sweden, while Estonian sawmills also import logs, mainly from Latvia and Russia. Wood pellets is another product which is almost exclusively exported.

Wood makes out the second largest source of domestic fuels in Estonia (the largest being oil shale). Wood is commonly used both on an industrial scale by large boilers fed by wood waste and chips, and in the residential sector via traditional firewood-burning stoves. Since 2008, there are also two combined heat and power plants, in Tallinn and Tartu respectively.

40% of the forests of Estonia belong to the state and are governed by the State Forest Management Centre (abbreviated RMK). National policies and legislation is aimed at safeguarding that an economically profitable yet ecologically sustainable silviculture is maintained. However, the State Forest Management Centre has been criticised (2010) for not pursuing a sustainable forest management.

=== Protected forests ===
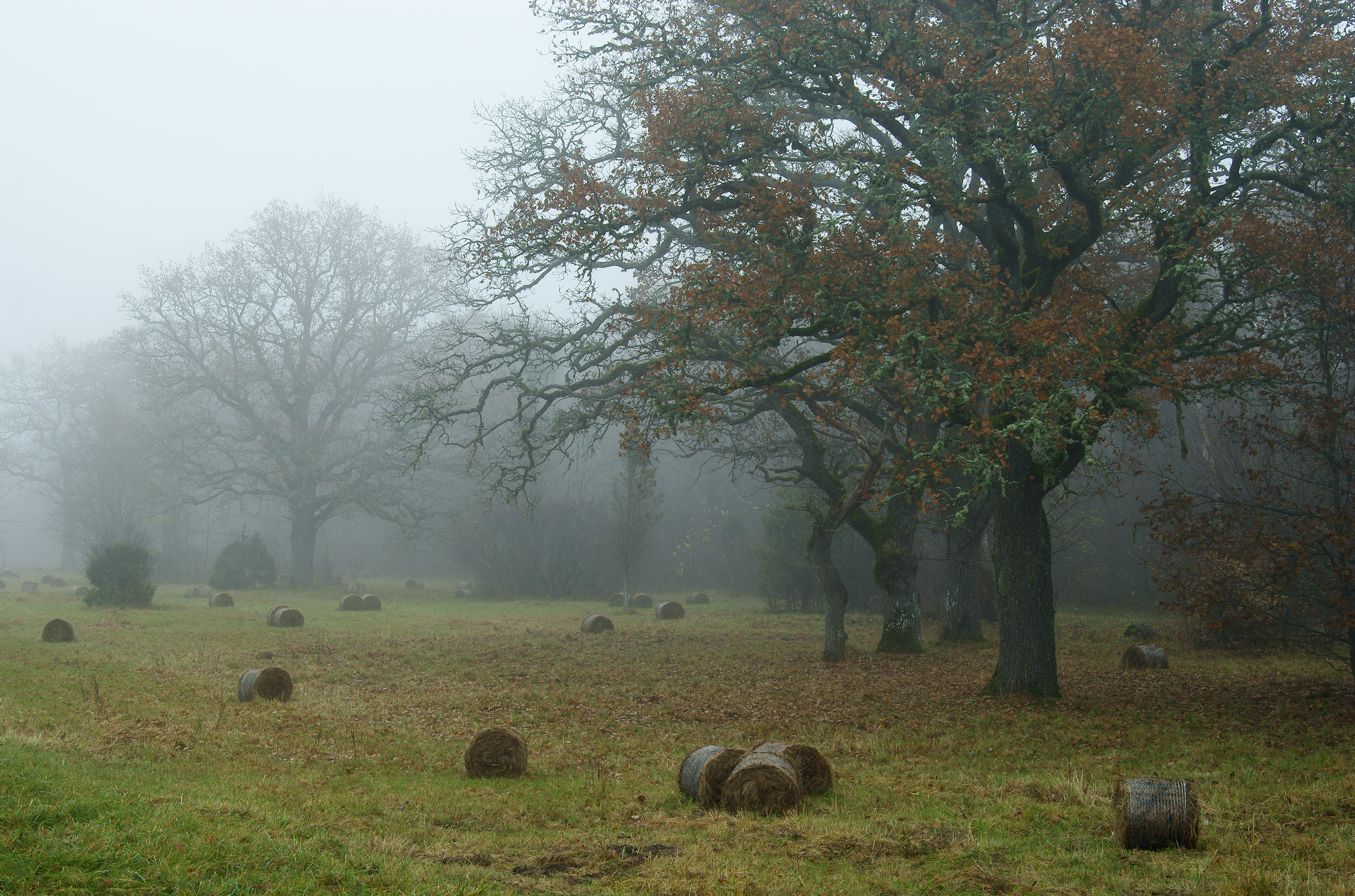
Oak forests are now very rare in Estonia and they are mostly under protection. Loode oaks in Saaremaa.

The proportion of protected forests in Estonia is relatively large, when compared with other similar countries which also pursue commercial forestry on a large scale. The first forests to be placed under protection were given the status of nature reserve in the 199999 .

=== Research ===
Estonia's main research institution dealing with forestry-related research is the Estonian University of Life Sciences in Tartu.

== See also ==
- Luua Arboretum
- Tamme-Lauri oak
