= Imukvere =

Village in Estonia

Coordinates: 58°44′20″N 26°38′33″E

- Village
- Interactive map of Imukvere
- Country: Estonia
- County: Jõgeva County
- Parish: Jõgeva Parish
- Time zone: UTC+2 (EET)
  - Summer (DST): UTC+3 (EEST)

Imukvere (German: Immofer) is a village in Jõgeva Parish, Jõgeva County in eastern Estonia.
