= Luua Arboretum =

Arboretum in Estonia

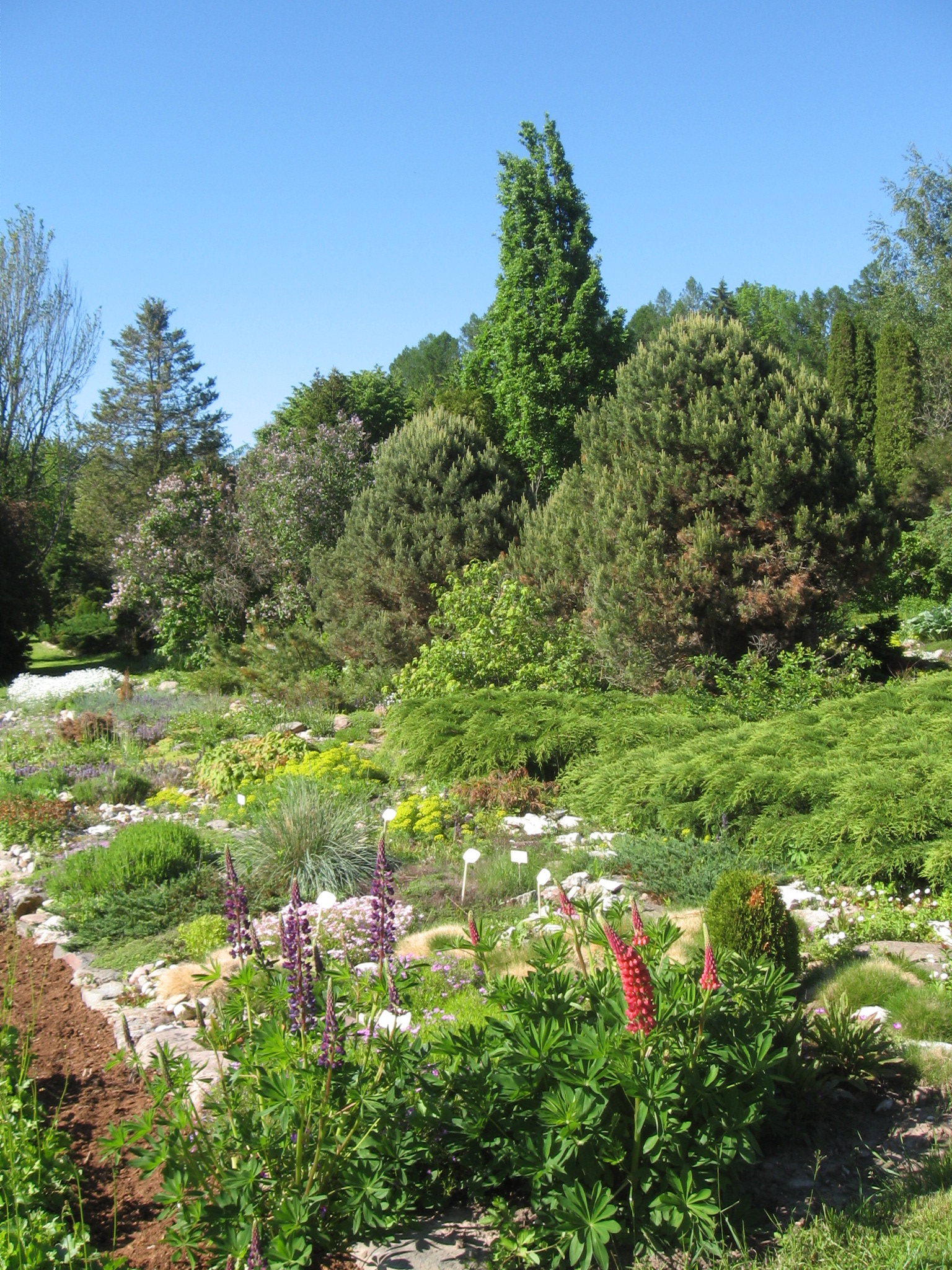
- Interactive map of Luua Arboretum
- Type: Arboretum and public park
- Location: Estonia
- Coordinates: 58°38′54.1″N 26°35′34.2″E
- Area: 8.5 hectares (21 acres)
- Created: 1953; 73 years ago
- Open: By appointment

Luua Arboretum is an arboretum in Luua, Estonia.

The arboretum was founded in 1953 and rapidly grew during the 1950s. By 1962, 2273 plants belonging to 327 taxa had been planted in the arboretum. Subsequently, the arboretum expanded less swiftly because plants from most common species had already been planted. Today the arboretum contains a large number of species, sources give vague numbers of "about 500" or "more than 800". The plants are organised according to their geographical origin; the arboretum has sections for plants from Europe, Siberia, Central Asia, the Far East and North America. The Central Asian and Siberian sections have the fewest taxa represented, while at least earlier the North American and the Far Eastern divisions were the richest. The whole arboretum is protected as a wildlife reserve by Estonian law.
