= Vanavälja, Jõgeva County =

Village in Estonia

Coordinates: 58°23′N 25°50′E

Vanavälja
- Village
- Interactive map of Vanavälja
- Country: Estonia
- County: Jõgeva County
- Parish: Jõgeva Parish
- Time zone: UTC+2 (EET)
  - Summer (DST): UTC+3 (EEST)

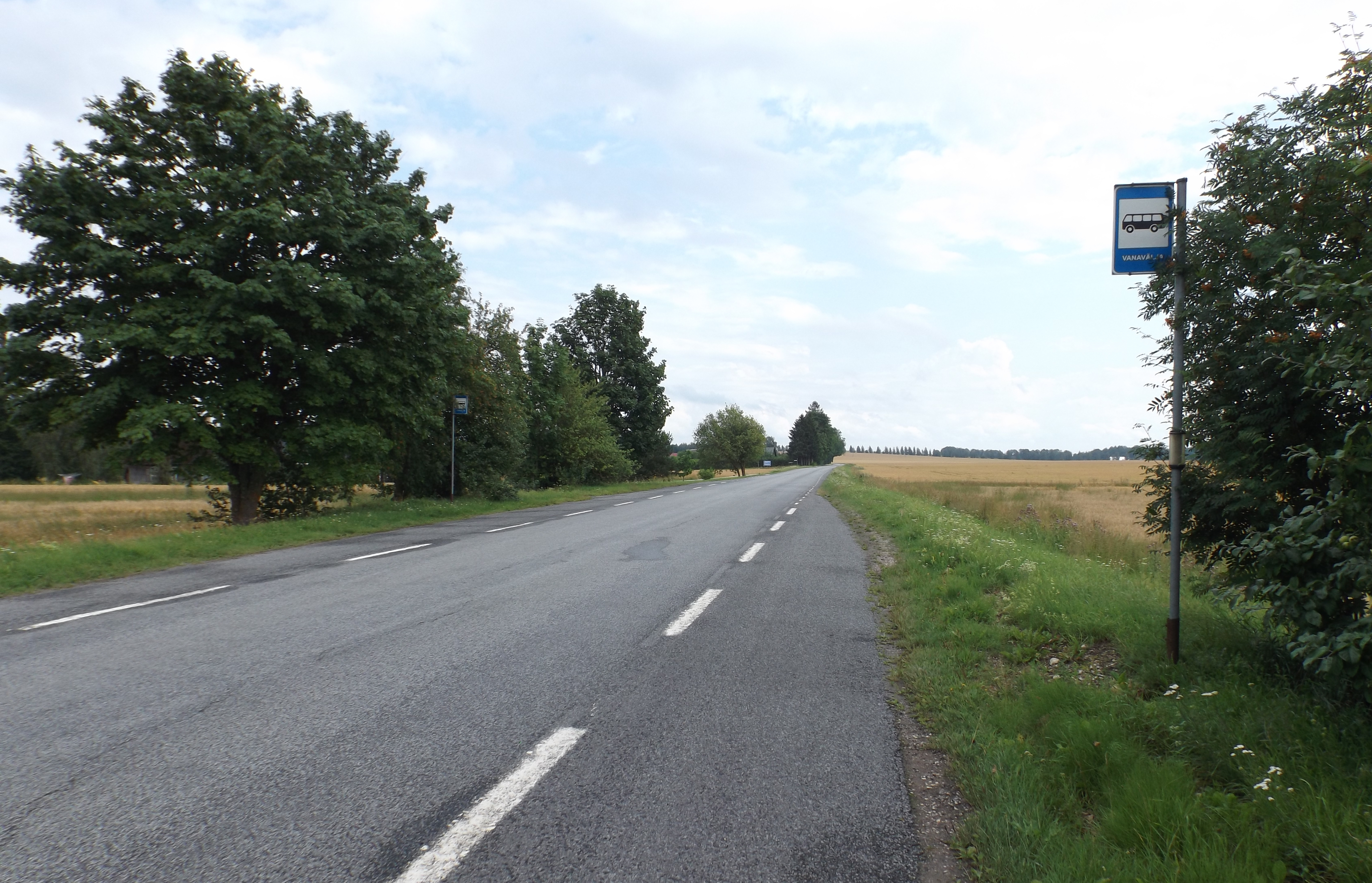
Bus stop in Vanavälja village on the Jõgeva-Palamuse-Saare road, 2024

Vanavälja is a village in Jõgeva Parish, Jõgeva County in eastern Estonia.
