= Estonian nationality law =

Citizenship Act kodakondsuse seadus

Riigikogu
- Citation: RT I 1995, 12, 122
- Territorial extent: Estonia
- Passed by: 7th Riigikogu
- Passed: 19 January 1995
- Commenced: 1 April 1995
- Status: Amended

Estonian citizenship law details the conditions by which a person is a citizen of Estonia. The primary law currently governing these requirements is the Citizenship Act, which came into force on 1 April 1995.

Estonia is a member state of the European Union (EU) and all Estonian citizens are EU citizens. They have automatic and permanent permission to live and work in any EU or European Free Trade Association (EFTA) country and may vote in elections to the European Parliament.

Any person born to at least one Estonian parent receives Estonian citizenship at birth. Non-citizens may naturalise as Estonian citizens after living in the country for at least eight years as a permanent resident or on a valid long-term residence permit and showing proficiency in the Estonian language.

From 1940-41 and 1944-91 Estonia was occupied by the Soviet Union and all local residents were considered citizens of the USSR by the former Soviet authorities. Since the restoration of the country's full independence in 1991, the Estonian government has asserted legal continuity with its pre-1940 predecessor and therefore all citizens of Estonia as of 1940 as well as all of their descendants are automatically considered citizens of Estonia now. Anyone who settled in the country during the 1940–1991 German and Soviet occupations, and their children, did not automatically become Estonian citizens in 1991, and many of these first and second generation immigrants have remained in Estonia as noncitizen residents.

== History ==
The Estonian National Council adopted the Resolution Concerning the Citizenship of the Democratic Republic of Estonia, the first Estonian citizenship law, on 26 November 1918. This law proclaimed as Estonian citizens all people who

- 1) were permanent residents on the day the law came into force on the territory of the Republic of Estonia;
- 2) prior to the Estonian Declaration of Independence on 24 February 1918 had been subjects of the Russian State;
- 3) were entered in the parish registers or originated from the territory of Estonia,

regardless of their ethnicity or faith.

The Citizenship Law adopted in 1922 defined the principles of succession by applying the jus sanguinis principle.

== Eligibility for Estonian citizenship ==
=== By descent ===
Children born to parents, at least one of whom was an Estonian citizen at the time of birth (regardless of the place of birth) are automatically considered Estonian citizens by descent.

=== By place of birth ===
Children born in Estonia are eligible for Estonian citizenship if at least one parent holds Estonian citizenship at the time of birth.

=== By marriage ===
A person who married an Estonian citizen before 26 February 1992 is eligible for Estonian citizenship.

=== By naturalisation ===
Those seeking to become Estonian citizens via naturalisation are required to fulfill the following criteria:

- applicant is aged 15 or over
- resided in Estonia legally for at least eight years and, of that, have spent the last five years with permanent residence in Estonia
- be familiar with the Estonian language. People who have graduated from an Estonian-speaking high school or an institute of higher education are assumed to fulfill this criterion without the need to take a full examination.
- take an examination demonstrating familiarity with the Estonian Constitution
- showing a demonstrated means of support
- taking an oath of loyalty

Those who have committed serious crimes or are foreign military personnel on active duty are ineligible to seek naturalisation as an Estonian citizen.

== Duties and rights of Estonian citizenship ==
- Male Estonian citizens are required to take up national service.

== Undefined citizenship ==
'Undefined citizenship' (Estonian: kodakondsuseta isik, Russian: негражданин) is a term used in Estonia to denote a post-Soviet form of statelessness. It is applied to those migrants from former Soviet republics and their children who were unable or unwilling to pursue any country's citizenship after the collapse of the Soviet Union. Russia being the successor state to the Soviet Union, all former USSR citizens qualified for citizenship of the Russian Federation, available upon request, as provided by the law "On the RSFSR Citizenship" in force up to the end of 2000. Estonia's policy of requiring naturalisation of post-war immigrants was in part influenced by Russia's citizenship law and the desire to prevent dual citizenship, and upon the established legal principle that persons who settle under the rule of an occupying power gain no automatic right to nationality. According to Peter Van Elsuwege, a scholar in European law at Ghent University, a number of historic precedents support this, most notably the case of Alsace-Lorraine when France on recovering the territory in 1918 did not automatically grant French citizenship to German settlers despite Germany having annexed the territory 47 years earlier in 1871.

The policy meant a high level of statelessness initially, with almost 30% of the population having no citizenship in the first years after Estonia regained independence in 1991. Human Rights Watch claims that this policy was discriminatory, especially against the country's Russian-speaking immigrant minority, and in violation of the International Convention on the Elimination of All Forms of Racial Discrimination. In the 2010s Estonia took steps to reduce child statelessness, including granting citizenship to children born to non-citizen parents automatically.

Persons of undefined citizenship who reside legally in Estonia can apply for an Estonian alien's passport. An Estonian alien's passport allows visa-free travel within Schengen treaty countries for a maximum of 90 days in a 6-month period. Alternatively they are entitled to naturalise as citizens and receive an Estonian passport, and more than half have opted to do so between 1992 and 2009.

The European Commission against Racism and Intolerance, Advisory Committee on the Framework Convention for the Protection of National Minorities and UN Special Rapporteur on racism Doudou Diène recommend to Estonia simplifying naturalization generally or for the elderly and economically marginalized, as well as encouraging registration of children born in Estonia after 1991 as its citizens.

== Dual citizenship ==
Multiple nationality is legally not permitted. However, in practice, birthright citizens can hold multiple nationalities. Naturalised citizens cannot hold multiple nationalities.

According to law, Estonian citizenship is forfeited by law upon voluntary acquisition of a foreign citizenship or entry into military or civilian service for another state. However, according to Article 8 of the Constitution, Estonian nationality by descent is inalienable and cannot be involuntarily revoked.

== Citizenship of the European Union ==
Because Estonia forms part of the European Union, Estonian citizens are also citizens of the European Union under European Union law and thus enjoy rights of free movement and have the right to vote in elections for the European Parliament. When in a non-EU country where there is no Estonian embassy, Estonian citizens have the right to get consular protection from the embassy of any other EU country present in that country. Estonian citizens can live and work in any country within the EU as a result of the right of free movement and residence granted in Article 21 of the EU Treaty.

== Travel freedom of Estonian citizens ==
Visa requirements for Estonian citizens

Visa requirements for Estonian citizens are administrative entry restrictions by the authorities of other states placed on citizens of Estonia. As of 7 July 2020, Estonian citizens had visa-free or visa on arrival access to 179 countries and territories, ranking the Estonian passport 13th in the world according to the Henley Passport Index. Holders of Estonian alien's passport face different visa requirements.

In 2017, the Estonian nationality is ranked twenty-first in the Nationality Index (QNI). This index differs from the Visa Restrictions Index, which focuses on external factors including travel freedom. The QNI considers, in addition, to travel freedom on internal factors such as peace & stability, economic strength, and human development as well.

== See also ==
- Estonian passport
- Non-citizens (Latvia)
- Non-citizen US Nationals - American Samoans, who are US nationals but not US citizens.
