= Estonian travel document for refugees =

Cover of a biometric Estonian travel document for refugees (old version)

An Estonian travel document for refugees is an internationally recognised travel document issued to refugees by the Police and Border Guard Board of the Ministry of Internal Affairs in Estonia in accordance to the 1951 United Nations Convention Relating to the Status of Refugees.

== Identity Information Page ==
Information page of an Estonian travel document for refugees issued after 20 September 2002

The Estonian travel document for refugees includes the following data:

- Photo of passport holder
- Type (S)
- Code of Issuing State (EST)
- Passport No.
- 1 Surname
- 2 Given Names
- 3 Nationality
- 4 Date of Birth
- 5 Personal No.
- 6 Sex
- 7 Place of Birth
- 8 Date of Issue
- 9 Authority
- 10 Date of Expiry
- 11 Holder's Signature
