= Estonian seafarer's discharge book =

Identity document issued by Estonian Police and Border Guard Board

Cover of an Estonian seafarer's discharge book (old version)

An Estonian seafarer's discharge book (Estonian: Meremehe teenistusraamat) is an identity document issued by Estonian Police and Border Guard Board in which the name, date of birth or personal identification code, and a photograph or facial image and the signature or image of signature of the holder are entered, unless otherwise provided by law or legislation established on the basis thereof. A seafarer who is an Estonian citizen shall be issued a seafarer’s discharge book which complies with the requirements of the “Convention concerning Seafarers’ National Identity Documents” of the International Labour Organisation (ILO). A seafarer’s discharge book shall be issued with a period of validity of up to five years.

== Identity Information Page ==
Information page of an Estonian seafarer's discharge book issued after the 1 July 2005

The Estonia Passport includes the following data:

- Photo of passport holder
- Type (S)
- Code of Issuing State (EST)
- Passport No.
- 1 Surname
- 2 Given Names
- 3 Nationality
- 4 Date of Birth
- 5 Personal No.
- 6 Sex
- 7 Place of Birth
- 8 Date of Issue
- 9 Authority
- 10 Date of Expiry
- 11 Holder's Signature

The information page ends with the Machine Readable Zone.

== Languages ==
The data page/information page is printed in Estonian and English.

== Biometric temporary travel documents ==
Starting from June 2009, all applicants for an Estonian seafarer's discharge book are required to provide their fingerprints to be stored on the biometric chip in their seafarer's discharge book.

== See also ==
- Police and Border Guard Board
