= Estonian alien's passport =

Travel document in Estonia

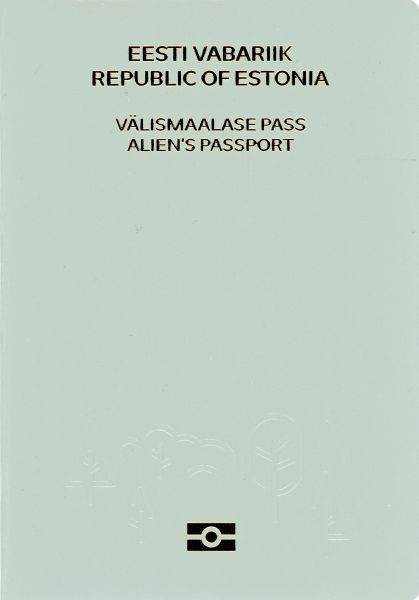
- The front cover of an Estonian alien's passport. A forest motif is embossed above the biometric symbol.
- Type: Alien's passport
- Issued by: Estonia
- First issued: 1992
- Purpose: Identification and Travel
- Eligibility: Persons of undefined citizenship residing in Estonia

An Estonian Alien's Passport (Estonian: välismaalase pass) is a travel document that may be issued to a person who is stateless or of undefined citizenship residing in Estonia by the Police and Border Guard Board of the Ministry of Internal Affairs. It can also be used as an identity document. In 2021, Estonia had fewer than 69,000 Alien's Passport Holders.

== History ==
After independence in 1991, the Estonian government granted Estonian citizenship to the persons who resided in the country before its annexation by the Soviet Union in 1940, as well as to their descendants. Those who could not prove that or arrived after 1940 and their children born in Estonia or elsewhere could acquire Estonian citizenship on condition that they be proficient in the Estonian language and know the country's history. But about 125,000 people (most but not all of whom were Russian speakers) who failed the tests or refused to take them have become stateless, or “non-citizens”, who hold a grey passport. Tens of thousands have opted for the red Russian passports proposed by Moscow. After a change in the law in 1995, all children born in Estonia after 1992 may obtain Estonian citizenship subject to certain conditions.

Based on the latest studies in 2025, about 65% of Estonian alien's passport owners would like to get the Estonian passport but most have not been successful. Reasons why someone may not get it can be can be criminal past, spread of fake news or simply lack of time and finances for naturalization process. Biggest problem is however lack of Estonian language as most Estonian alien's passport owners are senior citizens who never did need Estonian language in any capacity and Estonian state pays retirement under Estonian law the same way as to Estonian citizens and other residents with other citizenships.

== Identity information page ==
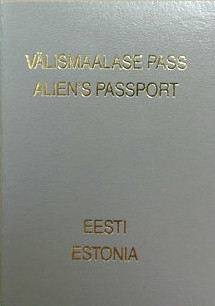
The front cover of an Estonian alien's passport issued from 1992 until 2014

Identity page of the Estonian alien's passport (old passport; 2007–2014 series)

The Estonia Passport includes the following data:

- Photo of passport holder
- Type (P for ordinary passports)
- Code of Issuing State (EST)
- Passport No.
- Surname
- Given Names
- Date of Birth
- Personal No.
- Sex
- Place of Birth
- Date of Issue
- Authority
- Date of Expiry
- Holder's Signature

The information page ends with the Machine Readable Zone.

== Visa requirements ==
The vast majority of nations which provide visa-free entry to Estonian citizens (those holding an Estonian passport) do not allow visa-free entry to holders of the Estonian alien's passport (who are not Estonian citizens).

Unlike Estonian citizens, holders of an Estonian alien's passport do not enjoy freedom of movement within the EU and the Schengen Area. They are allowed to stay in other Schengen Area countries for no more than 90 days in any 6-month period.

Moreover, holders of an Estonian alien's passport cannot legally work in other EU countries without a work permit. As with their Latvian counterparts, Estonian alien's passport holders can travel visa-free to Russia and Belarus, unlike ordinary Estonian citizens.

== See also ==
- Estonian passport
- Russians in Estonia
- Non-citizens (Latvia)
- E-residency of Estonia is a concept independent of nationality giving non-Estonian residents access to Estonian financial services.
- U.S. Passport indicating non-citizen nationals, who usually are American Samoans
