= Kuremaa =

Borough in Estonia

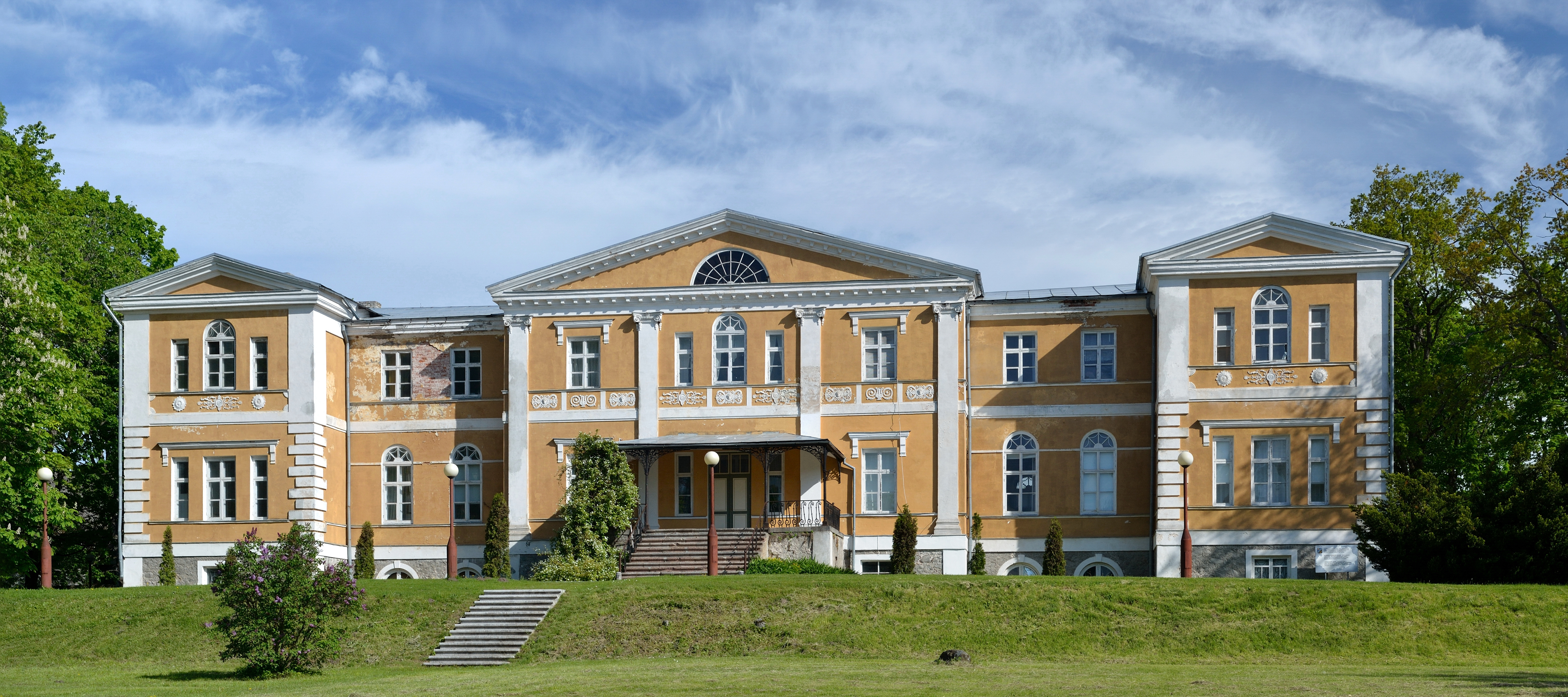
- Kuremaa manor house

- Location within Estonia
- Coordinates: 58°44′12″N 26°31′21″E
- Country: Estonia
- County: Jõgeva County
- Municipality: Jõgeva Parish

Population (2020)
  - Total: 280
- Time zone: UTC+2 (EET)

Kuremaa (German: Jensel) is a small borough (alevik) in Jõgeva Parish, Jõgeva County in eastern Estonia. It lies 10 km from Jõgeva, near the northern shore of Lake Kuremaa, the 11th largest lake in Estonia. Kuremaa features an estate that was owned by the von Oettingen family until the early 20th century. Part of the estate's manor house is now a museum, its windmill in neighbouring Mooritsa village is a popular landmark, and its terraced gardens reach down to the shore of Lake Kuremaa.

== History ==
The first known mention of Kuremaa is in historical records dated 1582, where it is referred to as Korymek. Other names used in historical texts include Kurremois, Jensel, and Jenselhof. According to Herbert Ligi, a noted Estonian historian, Johann Wrangel established a manor at Kuremaa in the middle of the 16th century. The region fell to the Polish at the end of the Livonian War and the manor was passed to Andreas Chotkowsky, but later returned to the Wrangel family when Fabian Wrangel bought it in 1598. The manor farm went through a number of possessions in the following centuries, and during its most successful periods supported a large number of peasants.

== People ==
Estimated population in 2009 was 367 inhabitants. The lake's beach draws many visitors, so many of the residents of Kuremaa today are employed in the tourism and hospitality industries, such as running guest houses, operating water sports on the lake, and managing and maintaining the manor house and its grounds for visitors.

== Manor estate and house ==
After returning to the Wrangels at the end of the 16th century, the manor farm came into the possession of the notable Ungern-Sternberg family around the middle of the 17th century, presumably by purchase. Moritz Wilhelm Pistohlkors then bought the farm in 1766 after having been severely wounded in the Seven Years' War. He let the farm until his death in 1783, bequeathing it to his son. Ill-managed afterwards, the estate eventually went bankrupt and was acquired in 1810 by Liivimaa Krediidiühing to pay off the farm's debts. Eleven years later it was sold to Reinhold Wilhelm von Liphart, and in 1828 it was inherited by his grandson Karl Eduard von Liphart.

The most notable period in the history of the estate, and its time of greatest growth, came after it was purchased by Alexander von Oettingen in 1834. Beginning in 1837, he oversaw the building of a mansion for the estate which was completed in 1843 by the architect Emil Julius Strauss. The cultivation of cereals and potatoes was renewed in earnest and the main income was from the sale of grain, until a successful distillery was set up around 1880, which produced 50,000 litres of alcohol by 1920. The farm was also notable for its dairy production, with a large herd of dairy cattle from which cheese, butter, and cream were produced and sold, usually in Saint Petersburg. Alexander von Oettingen had six sons and three daughters with his wife Helena, including the notable Georg von Oettingen, Alexander von Oettingen, and Arthur von Oettingen. After his death in 1846, the estate was able to continue working and stay within the family. His son Eduard Reinhold managed the farm until 1906, then Eduard Reinhold's son Erich August took over until the estate was seized by the Estonian government in 1919. It is recorded that when Alexander von Oettingen purchased the estate in 1834, there were only eighteen buildings. By the time of its transfer to the government 85 years later, there were 48 buildings on the farm.

Estonia's sweeping and full-scale land reforms in 1919 saw the expropriation of all estates held by the Baltic nobility. Redistributed to the peasants, Kuremaa's farm and manor were in danger of falling into disuse or poor management. The following year an agricultural school was set up, mainly providing training in the animal husbandry of dairy cattle. Although seemingly intended to be a one-off programme of one year's duration, the school proved successful for many years. In 2004, the agricultural school was unified with the forestry school in Luua and since then educational activity has ended in Kuremaa.

The stately manor house was extended and refurbished in 1935. On 22 February 1986 a fire damaged much of the building and it was entirely rebuilt in the same style, reopening in December 1987. Part of the mansion is open to the public as a museum, while other areas are used as conference facilities.

Another interesting building on the estate is the historic windmill, which was refurbished in 2009. Its first two floors can be hired as a party or event venue, while its third floor is a small museum on the history of windmills in Estonia.

A few miles from the estate is the von Oettingen family cemetery, designed by Walter von Engelhardt in about 1899. Approximately 29 members of the von Oettingen family are buried in the 4-hectare forested cemetery, which includes a neo-Gothic chapel. After World War II the cemetery was heavily looted and vandalised. Some restoration of the cemetery and the chapel was undertaken in 1988.

== Lake Kuremaa ==
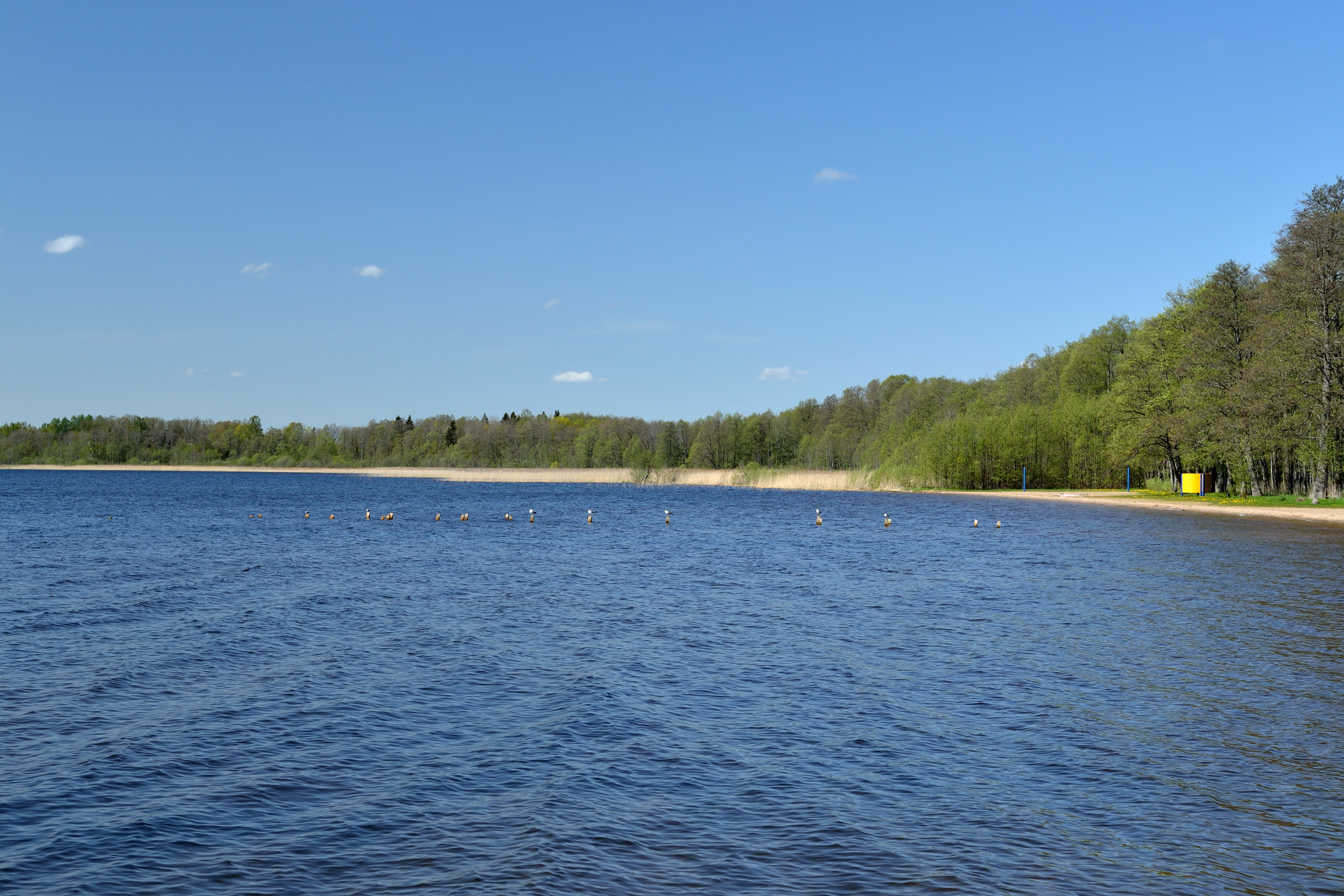
Lake Kuremaa

Lake Kuremaa (Estonian: Kuremaa järv) is the 11th largest in Estonia, at 4.3 km long and 1.3 km wide. Its greatest depth is 13.3 m and its water is a yellowish green. It is well stocked with fish and crustaceans, and grebe, ducks, and swans nest here. The 250 m long sandy beach on the northern shore was created in 1963, when the level of the lake was lowered. It is very popular, particularly in summer, having campsites, guest houses, water sports, cafes, lifeguards, and other holiday amenities. Each year a motorcycle camping rally called Jõgevatreff is held here, drawing over a thousand visitors.

== See also ==
- Lake Kuremaa
