= Hilda Taba =

Estonian architect and educator (1902–1967)

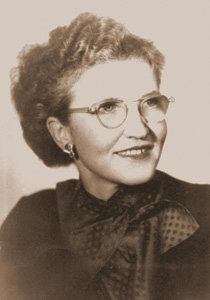
Hilda Taba

Hilda Taba (7 December 1902 in Kooraste, Governorate of Livonia – 6 July 1967 in San Francisco, California) was a curriculum theorist, curriculum reformer, and teacher educator.

== Biography ==
Taba was born in the small village of Kooraste, Estonia. Her mother's name was Liisa Leht, and her father was a schoolmaster whose name was Robert Taba. Hilda Taba began her education at the Kanepi Parish School. She then attended the Võru’s Girls’ Grammar School and earned her undergraduate degree in English and Philosophy at the University of Tartu. When Taba was given the opportunity to attend Bryn Mawr College in Pennsylvania, she earned her master's degree. Following the completion of her degree at Bryn Mawr College, she attended Teachers College at Columbia University. She applied for a job at the University of Tartu but was turned down because she was female, so she became curriculum director at the Dalton School in New York City. In 1951, Taba accepted an invitation to become a professor at San Francisco State College, now known as San Francisco State University.

Taba died in 1967 at Peninsula Hospital in Burlingame, California.

== Author ==
Taba was a student of John Dewey; she wrote her first dissertation after studying with him and wrote a total of seven books. Her dissertation entitled Dynamics of Education: A Methodology of Progressive Educational Thought (1932) focused on educating for democracy. She discussed how children should learn how to relate to one another through democratic relationships. Two other key ideas in her dissertation included how learning should involve dynamic, interrelated, and interdependent processes and how educators are accountable for the delivery and the evaluation of the curriculum. She also believed educational curriculum should focus on teaching students to think rather than simply to regurgitate facts.

After working with John Dewey, Benjamin Bloom, Ralph W. Tyler, Deborah Elkins, and Robert Havighurst, she wrote a book entitled Curriculum Development: Theory and Practice (1962). Taba wrote:

One scarcely needs to emphasize the importance of critical thinking as a desirable ingredient in human beings in a democratic society. No matter what views people hold of the chief function of education, they at least agree that people need to learn to think. In a society in which changes come fast, individuals cannot depend on routinized behavior or tradition in making decisions, whether on practical everyday or professional matters, moral values, or political issues. In such a society, there is a natural concern that individuals be capable of intelligent and independent thought.

Taba explains a process for what educators should teach and how they can accomplish desired student outcomes. In order for teachers to teach effectively, they need to understand the three levels of knowledge. Taba lists them as facts, basic ideas and principles, and concepts. Too much factual information is often presented very quickly, so students do not make connections between the new information and the information stored in their brains. Hilda Taba explains how when facts are simply memorized and not connected to previously known information, students forget the memorized facts within approximately two years. Taba says basic ideas and principles should be selected based on what information children are able to learn at their ages and based on what information has scientific validity. The final level of knowledge, concepts, involves students using knowledge from all content areas to predict outcomes or effects.

== Approach ==
Because Taba died in her sixties while she was still an inspiring educator, her students continued her work. Many of her students, who were members of the Institute for Staff Development in Miami, used Taba's ideas to create four thinking strategies known as the Taba approach. The four strategies are concept development, interpretation of data, application of generalizations, and interpretations of feelings, attitudes and values. Using all four strategies, the Taba approach's goal is to facilitate students in thinking more efficiently. Based on Taba's methods, “to think” means “helping them [students] to formulate data into conceptual patterns, to verbalize relationships between discrete segments of data, to make inferences from data, to make generalizations on the basis of data and to test these generalizations, and to become sensitive to such corollary relationships as cause and effect and similarities and differences.”

Taba's strategies for encouraging students to think focus on the teacher as the mediator rather than the teacher as the lecturer. When utilizing the Taba approach, the teacher leads the discussion but encourages the students to share their opinions and to relate their own ideas to their peers’ ideas. The teacher must not judge the students by their answers and can neither agree nor disagree with their responses. Phrases such as “That’s not quite what I had in mind,” are not acceptable when using the Taba approach. Even positive phrases such as “Correct,” or “Now you’re thinking,” are too judgmental for teachers to say. Along with verbal feedback, the teacher should avoid giving nonverbal cues such as smiling during certain students’ responses and scratching his or her head during other students’ responses. The teacher's role in the discussion is to encourage the students to expand on their classmates’ ideas or to ask students to clarify their own ideas.

== Legacy ==
Through Hilda Taba's teachings and through her books, Taba greatly contributed to American education. In a 1970 survey of over two hundred educators who had participated in training concerning the Taba approach, nearly all of the educators said the strategies were valuable to their classrooms. Some of the teachers even reported that Taba's approach to teaching was “the most valuable teaching technique they had ever acquired.”
