= Viilma =

Viilma is an Estonian surname. Notable people with the surname include:

- Luule Viilma (1950–2002), Estonian doctor
- Urmas Viilma (born 1973), Estonian prelate
