= Ago Roo =

Estonian actor (born 1946)

- Born: 11 May 1946 (age 80); Visusti, then part of Estonian SSR, Soviet Union
- Citizenship: Estonian
- Occupation: Actor
- Years active: 1968–present

Ago Roo (born 11 May 1946) is an Estonian stage, television, voice, and film actor who began his career in theatre in 1968. Roo has been employed at several notable theatres in Estonian during his career and has appeared in film and television. He has been a member of the Estonian Theatre Association since 1969 and the Estonian Actors' Union since 1993.

== Early life and education ==
Ago Roo was born in the small village of Visusti in Järva County. His father was a forestry technician and his mother was an accountant. He attended schools in Elva, graduating from secondary school in 1964. Afterward, he enrolled in the theatre department of the Tallinn State Conservatory (now, the Estonian Academy of Music and Theatre) to study acting, under the stage direction of actor and theatre pedagogue Voldemar Panso, graduating in 1968. Among his graduating classmates were: Helle-Reet Helenurm, Peeter Jakobi, Katrin Karisma, Enn Klooren, Kalju Komissarov, Jaan Tooming, Mari Lill, and Raivo Trass. Among Roo's diploma production roles was that of Baron in Maxim Gorky's The Lower Depths.

== Career ==
=== Stage ===
In 1968, following his graduation from the Tallinn State Conservatory, Roo began a year-long engagement as a stage actor at the Rakvere Theatre, IN 1969, he left the Rakvere Theatre and began an engagement at the Lydia Koidula Pärnu Drama Theatre (now, the Endla Theatre) in Pärnu. Roo would be employed at the Endla Theatre for nine years, leaving in 1978 to join the Estonian SSR State Youth Theatre (since 1994, the Tallinn City Theatre). In 2009, following budgetary cuts to the theatre, Roo, along with actresses Ene Järvis and Marje Metsur, were dismissed. After departing the Tallinn City Theatre, Roo became a freelance actor.

=== Film ===
In 1970, Roo made his feature film debut in the small role of Olev in the Tallinnfilm drama Valge laev, directed by Tallinn State Conservatory classmate Kalju Komissarov. In 1972, he appeared in a larger role as Jürgen in the Madis Ojamaa directed historical Tallinnfilm adventure film Verekivi, followed by the role of Sergeant Major in the Veljo Käsper directed World War II period drama Ohtlikud mängud in 1974, also for Tallinnfilm.

Prominent film roles of the 1980s include that of Baron Rennenkampf in the 1980 Mark Soosaar directed Tallinnfilm period drama Jõulud Vigalas; Röövel, in the 1984 Helle Murdmaa directed Tallinnfilm fantasy film Karoliine hõbelõng; and as Ordumeister, in the 1984 Olav Neuland directed Tallinnfilm fantasy film Hundiseaduse aegu.

Notable film roles in the 1990s, include that of Death in the 1991 Tõnu Virve directed historical epic Surmatants for Freyja Film; Von Stock's servant, in the historical Jaan Kolberg directed adventure film Jüri Rumm, based on the life of the 19th-century Estonian itinerant outlaw of the same name; and as Pensioner the 1999 Valentin Kuik directed Onfilm drama Lurjus, adapted from the 1927 short-story The Scoundrel (also known as An Affair of Honour) by Vladimir Nabokov.

In 2005, Roo appeared as Pope Innocent III in the joint ETV, Exitfilm, Õ-Fraktsioon historic comedy film Malev, directed by Kaaren Kaer. This was followed by the role of a cleric in the Rainer Sarnet directed Exitfilm drama Kuhu põgenevad hinged in 2007, based on the 2007 Aidi Vallik novel Mis sinuga juhtus, Ann?. In 2012, he appeared as Boss in the Andres Kõpper and Arun Tamm directed thriller Vasaku jala reede, for Tallinn Skyline Productions.

=== Television ===
In addition to film, Ago Roo has appeared in various roles in teleplays, telefilms, television series, and miniseries. Some of Roo's most notable roles on television include that of Jüri Roll in the 1984 Peeter Urbla directed Eesti Televisioon (ETV) World War II television film Võõra nime all, and the recurring role of Nikifor Kessner on the ETV comedy series ENSV, which ran from 2010 until 2019 and humorously reflected on life in the 1980s during the era of the Estonian Soviet Socialist Republic.
