= Hermann Guido von Samson-Himmelstjerna =

Baltic-German physician

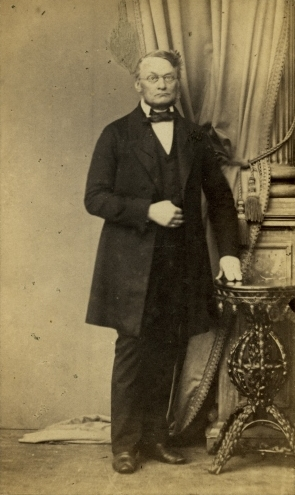
Guido Samson von Himmelstiern, ca 1860

Hermann Guido von Samson-Himmelstjerna; name sometimes given as Guido Samson von Himmelstiern (30 January [O.S. 18 January] 1809, Korast – 30 January [O.S. 18 January] 1868, Dorpat) was a Baltic German medical doctor and professor of Staatsarzneikunde (state pharmacopoeia).

From 1826 he studied medicine at the Imperial University of Dorpat, earning his doctorate in 1834. Afterwards he continued his education at the Frederick William's University of Berlin, the University of Würzburg and the University of Vienna, where he studied with Karl von Rokitansky (1804-1878). From 1845 until his death in 1868 he was a medical professor at Dorpat. From 1865 until his death he was also the rector. He was the president of the Estonian Naturalists' Society in 1862–1868.

In 1856–58 with ophthalmologist Georg von Oettingen (1824-1916), he conducted statistical research of over 650,000 inhabitants of Livonia in regard to eye disease and blindness. The two doctors included their findings in a treatise titled Populäre Anleitung zur Pflege und Behandlung der unter der ländlichen Bevölkerung in den Ostseevrovinzen Rußlands in sondere in Livland am häufigsten vorkommenden Augenkrankheiten (Popular Guide to the Care and Treatment of the Rural Population in the Russian Baltic Provinces, particularly in Livonia in regard to Common Diseases of the Eye, 1860).

Preceded by Friedrich Bidder	Rector of the Imperial University of Dorpat; 1865–1868	Succeeded by Georg von Oettingen
