= Jõgeva =

Town in Estonia

- Town
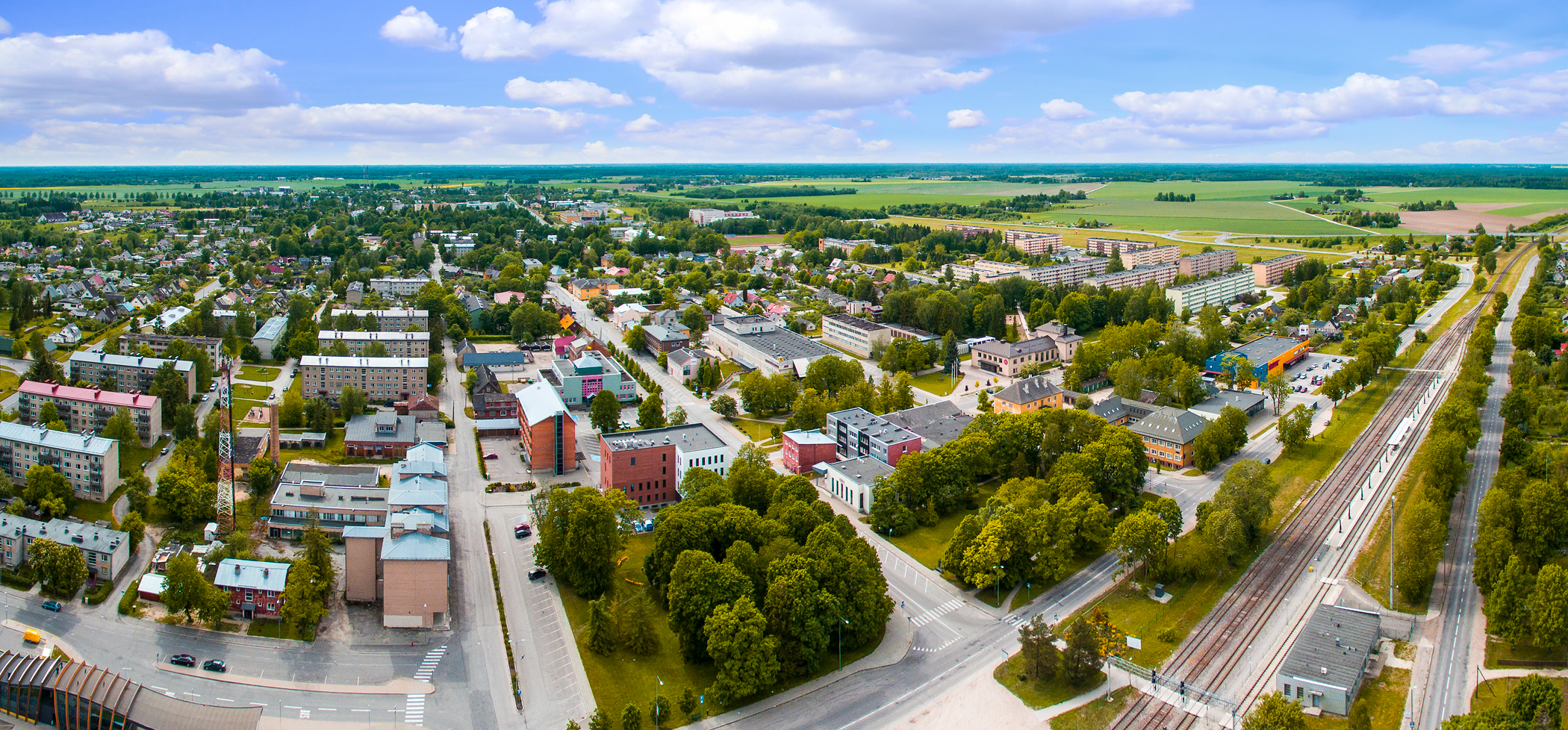
- Jõgeva panorama

- Location in Estonia
- Coordinates: 58°44′49″N 26°24′0″E
- Country: Estonia
- County: Jõgeva County
- Municipality: Jõgeva Parish
- First mentioned: 1599
- Borough rights: 13 October 1919
- Town rights: 1 May 1938

Area
  - Total: 3.86 km^{2} (1.49 sq mi)

Population (2026)
  - Total: 4,934
  - Rank: 23rd
  - Density: 1,280/km^{2} (3,310/sq mi)
- Time zone: UTC+2 (EET)
  - Summer (DST): UTC+3 (EEST)

Drone video of Jõgeva in July 2021

Jõgeva is a small town in Estonia with a population of around 5000 people. It is the capital of Jõgeva Parish and Jõgeva County.

== History ==
Jõgeva was first mentioned in 1599 as Jagiwa manor, being established only recently on the lands of the same named village by the orders of the Polish king. During the Polish reign in Estonia (1582–1622) it was part of Laiuse starostwo, which became Laiuse fief during Swedish rule (1622–1721).

In 1756, Jõgeva manor became the property of Gotthard Johann von Manteuffel (1690–1763) and remained in the family of von Manteuffel until 1919 when it was nationalized by the government. In 1876, a railway station, named Laisholm after the manor, was established near the village of Jõgeva (German: Laisholm). The owner of Jõgeva manor, Ernst Gotthard von Manteuffel (1844–1922), started renting out land around the railway station in 1903. After that, the village grew quickly. On October 13, 1919, Jõgeva became a borough and on 1 May 1938, a town.

During the Second World War nearly 60% of the town was destroyed.

During the Soviet occupation of Estonia Jõgeva became an important administrative center with several big industries. Many new administrative, commercial and residential buildings were erected at that time.

== Demographics ==
Ethnic Composition 1922-2021
Ethnicity	1922		1934		1941		1959		1970		1979		1989		2000		2011		2021	
Ethnicity	amount	%	amount	%	amount	%	amount	%	amount	%	amount	%	amount	%	amount	%	amount	%	amount	%
Estonians	840	92.3	1088	95.1	1044	97.1	2304	92.3	3214	88.2	4554	84.5	5961	84.7	5670	88.3	5036	91.5	4821	92.3
Russians	43	4.73	35	3.06	14	1.30	-	-	189	5.19	545	10.1	728	10.3	470	7.32	324	5.89	240	4.60
Ukrainians	-	-	0	0.00	-	-	-	-	35	0.96	91	1.69	144	2.05	89	1.39	63	1.15	71	1.36
Belarusians	-	-	-	-	-	-	-	-	27	0.74	45	0.84	50	0.71	35	0.55	22	0.40	19	0.36
Finns	-	-	0	0.00	0	0.00	-	-	33	0.91	56	1.04	72	1.02	58	0.90	19	0.35	17	0.33
Jews	3	0.33	5	0.44	0	0.00	-	-	0	0.00	1	0.02	1	0.01	0	0.00	0	0.00	0	0.00
Latvians	-	-	3	0.26	2	0.19	-	-	8	0.22	13	0.24	6	0.09	9	0.14	4	0.07	4	0.08
Germans	11	1.21	5	0.44	-	-	-	-	-	-	70	1.30	40	0.57	9	0.14	6	0.11	5	0.10
Tatars	-	-	1	0.09	-	-	-	-	-	-	1	0.02	3	0.04	4	0.06	2	0.04	3	0.06
Poles	-	-	5	0.44	5	0.47	-	-	-	-	5	0.09	6	0.09	3	0.05	0	0.00	0	0.00
Lithuanians	-	-	1	0.09	0	0.00	-	-	7	0.19	5	0.09	6	0.09	9	0.14	7	0.13	8	0.15
unknown	0	0.00	1	0.09	1	0.09	0	0.00	0	0.00	0	0.00	0	0.00	52	0.81	2	0.04	9	0.17
other	13	1.43	0	0.00	9	0.84	192	7.69	131	3.59	3	0.06	18	0.26	12	0.19	16	0.29	28	0.54
Total	910	100	1144	100	1075	100	2496	100	3644	100	5389	100	7035	100	6420	100	5501	100	5222	100.06

== Location ==
Jõgeva is situated on the right shore of Pedja River which flows through the city from north to south. Parallel with the river is the Tallinn–Tartu railway line. The major cities Tartu and Tallinn are respectively 51 and 154 kilometres (96 miles) from Jõgeva, both connected through railway as well as through highways.

== Nature and climate ==
Jõgeva is located between big drumlins. The hill of Laiuse is located east from the town. River Pedja passes through the town. Jõgeva has a humid continental climate (Dfb). Winters are usually snowy and cold. It is known as the coldest place in Estonia with the lowest temperature of −43.5 °C (−46.3 °F). Summers are warm and often humid, some days the maximum can reach 30°-35°C. Thunder season starts in April and ends usually in the end of October.

Climate data for Jõgeva (normals 1991–2020, extremes 1922–present)
Month	Jan	Feb	Mar	Apr	May	Jun	Jul	Aug	Sep	Oct	Nov	Dec	Year
Record high °C (°F)	9.6 (49.3)	10.0 (50.0)	17.2 (63.0)	27.1 (80.8)	30.5 (86.9)	33.1 (91.6)	33.4 (92.1)	34.6 (94.3)	29.6 (85.3)	20.8 (69.4)	13.1 (55.6)	11.2 (52.2)	34.6 (94.3)
Mean daily maximum °C (°F)	−2.0 (28.4)	−2.0 (28.4)	2.8 (37.0)	10.5 (50.9)	16.7 (62.1)	20.5 (68.9)	23.1 (73.6)	21.6 (70.9)	16.2 (61.2)	8.9 (48.0)	3.0 (37.4)	−0.3 (31.5)	9.9 (49.8)
Daily mean °C (°F)	−4.5 (23.9)	−5.1 (22.8)	−1.3 (29.7)	5.1 (41.2)	10.9 (51.6)	15.0 (59.0)	17.5 (63.5)	16.0 (60.8)	11.3 (52.3)	5.6 (42.1)	0.9 (33.6)	−2.3 (27.9)	5.8 (42.4)
Mean daily minimum °C (°F)	−7.5 (18.5)	−8.5 (16.7)	−5.3 (22.5)	0.4 (32.7)	4.7 (40.5)	9.1 (48.4)	11.6 (52.9)	10.7 (51.3)	6.8 (44.2)	2.5 (36.5)	−1.4 (29.5)	−4.8 (23.4)	1.5 (34.7)
Record low °C (°F)	−43.5 (−46.3)	−39 (−38)	−34 (−29)	−23.7 (−10.7)	−8.5 (16.7)	−3 (27)	0.5 (32.9)	0.0 (32.0)	−8.4 (16.9)	−18.5 (−1.3)	−26 (−15)	−40.2 (−40.4)	−43.5 (−46.3)
Average precipitation mm (inches)	50 (2.0)	39 (1.5)	36 (1.4)	34 (1.3)	45 (1.8)	85 (3.3)	65 (2.6)	90 (3.5)	52 (2.0)	69 (2.7)	55 (2.2)	52 (2.0)	672 (26.5)
Average precipitation days (≥ 1.0 mm)	11	9	8	8	8	9	11	11	11	12	13	13	126
Average relative humidity (%)	90	87	80	72	68	73	73	79	83	88	91	91	81
Mean monthly sunshine hours	31.2	61.0	124.0	177.0	268.0	276.6	276.1	227.7	140.2	81.8	29.8	17.9	1,711.4
Source 1: Estonian Weather Service
Source 2: NOAA/NCEI (sun and precipitation day, 1991-2020)

== Culture ==
In July Jõgevatreff, an annual bikers reunion takes place. The culmination of the event is the parade of the bikers through the town. In August, the annual Garlic Festival is held. Jõgeva is also regarded as the headquarters of the Estonian Santa Claus.

== Sights and buildings ==
- The house museum of Estonian poet Betti Alver - the house by the railway station where she was born;
- Külmasammas - a monument marking the Estonian cold record of −43.5 °C (−46 °F) recorded in Jõgeva in 1940;
- The Estonian War of Independence memorial stone to commemorate the casualties;
- The memorial to the casualties of the Second World War;
- The memorial to the Estonian deportees during Soviet occupation in 1941 and 1949;

== International relations ==
=== Twin towns - Sister cities ===
The former urban municipality of Jõgeva (until 2017) was twinned with:

- Jonava, Lithuania
- Kaarina, Finland
- Karlstad, Sweden
- Keuruu, Finland

== Gallery ==
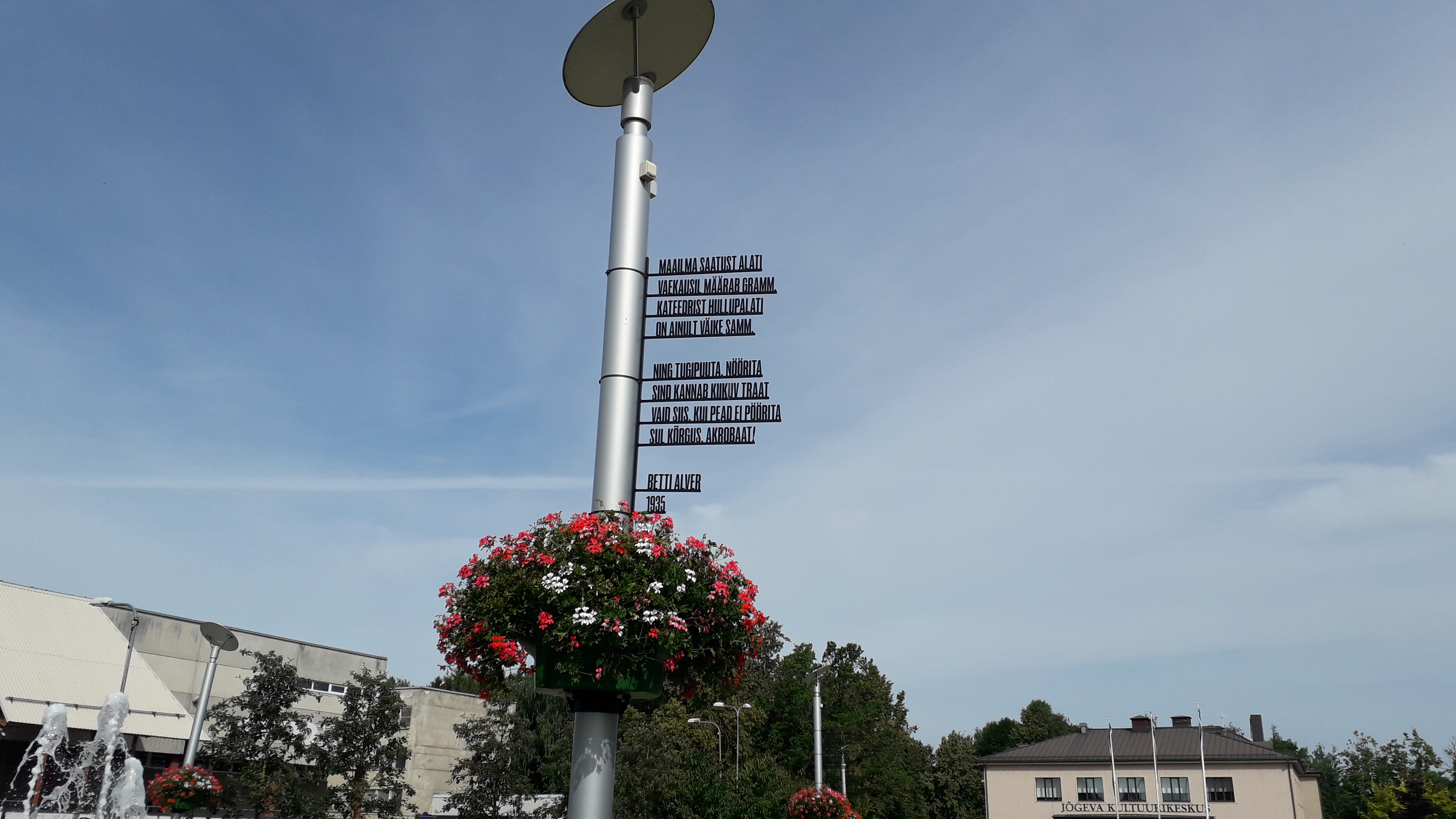
Monument to the poet Betti Alver in Jõgeva

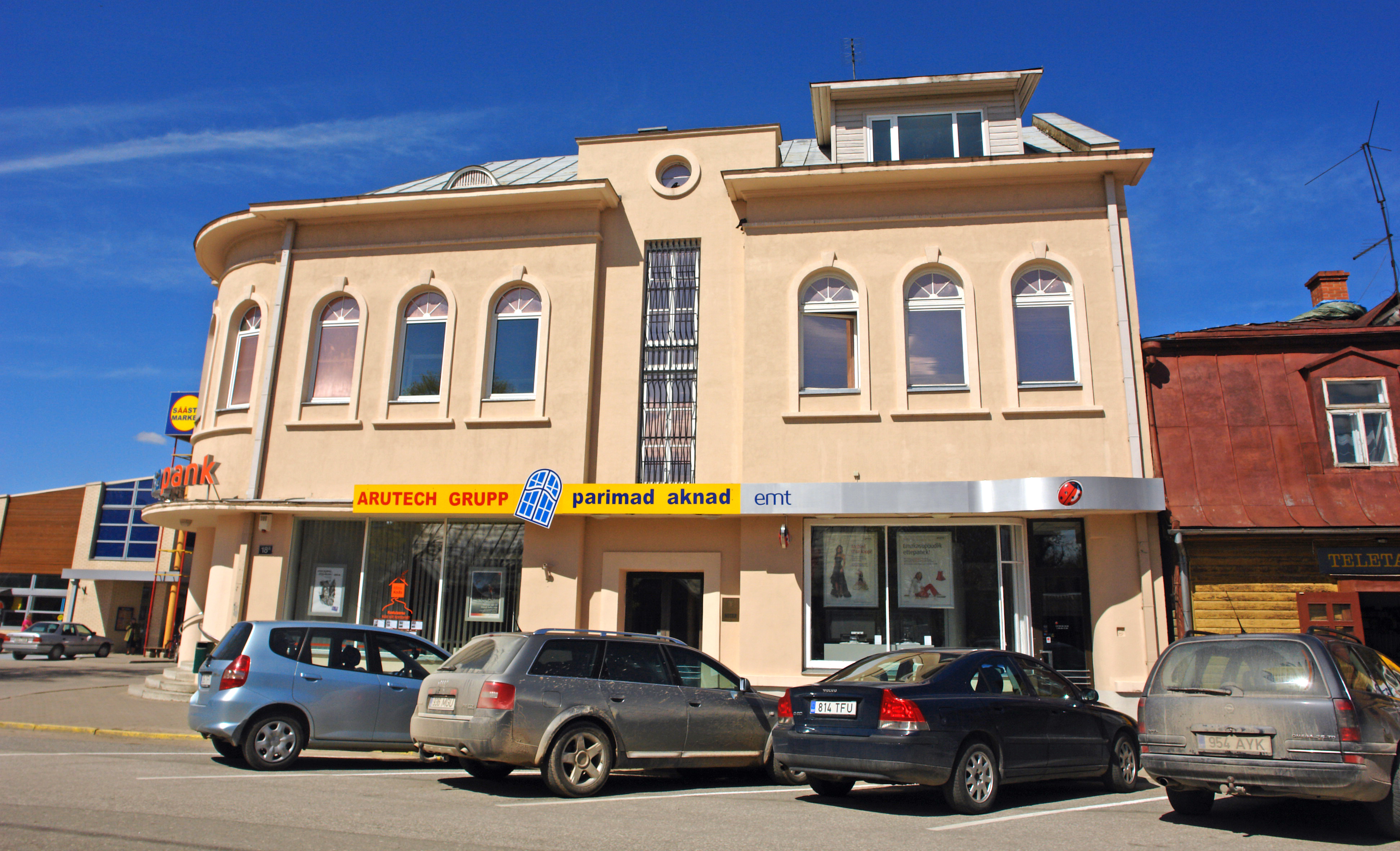
Bank in Jõgeva

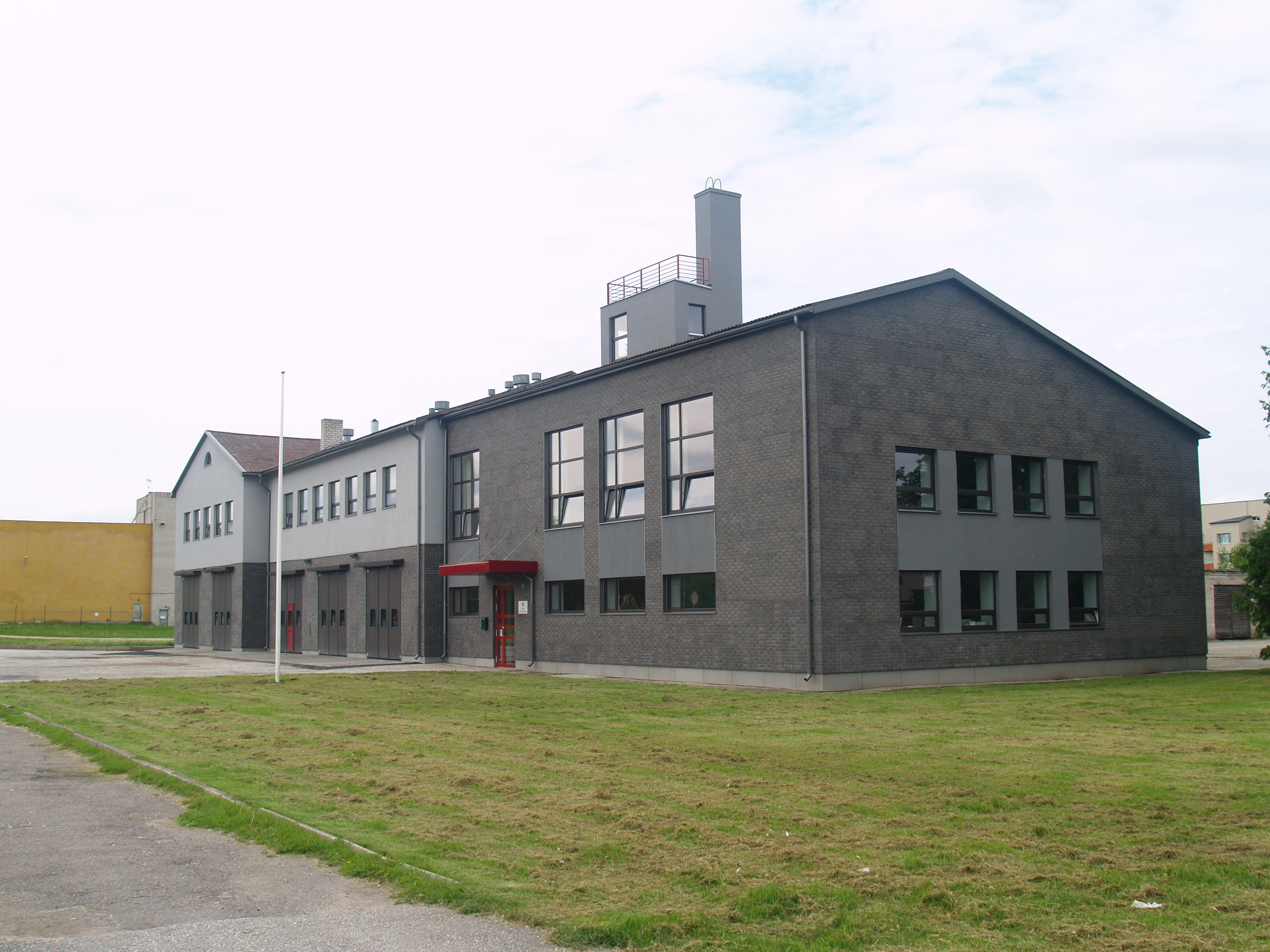
Fire station and rescue building

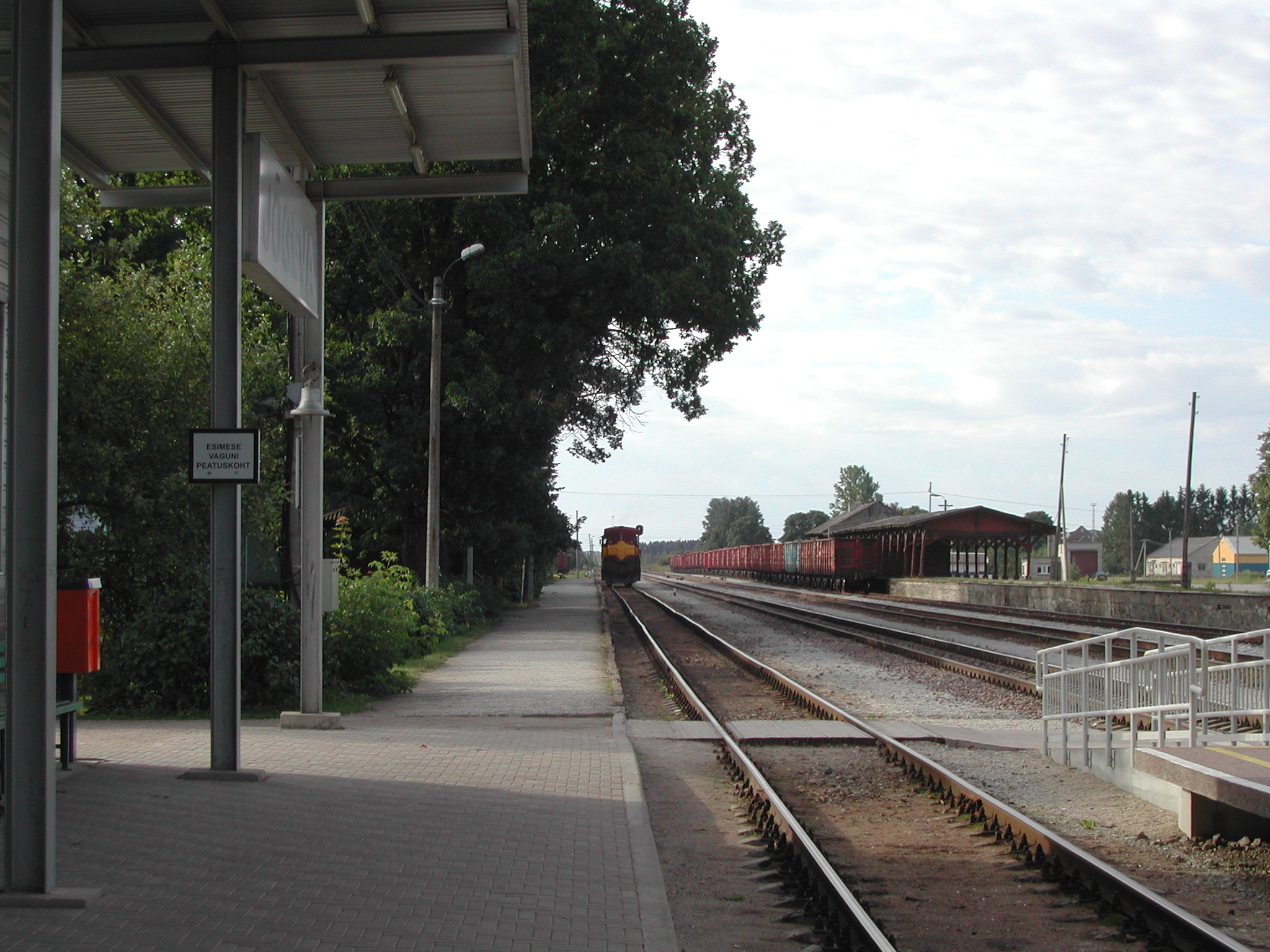
Jõgeva railway station

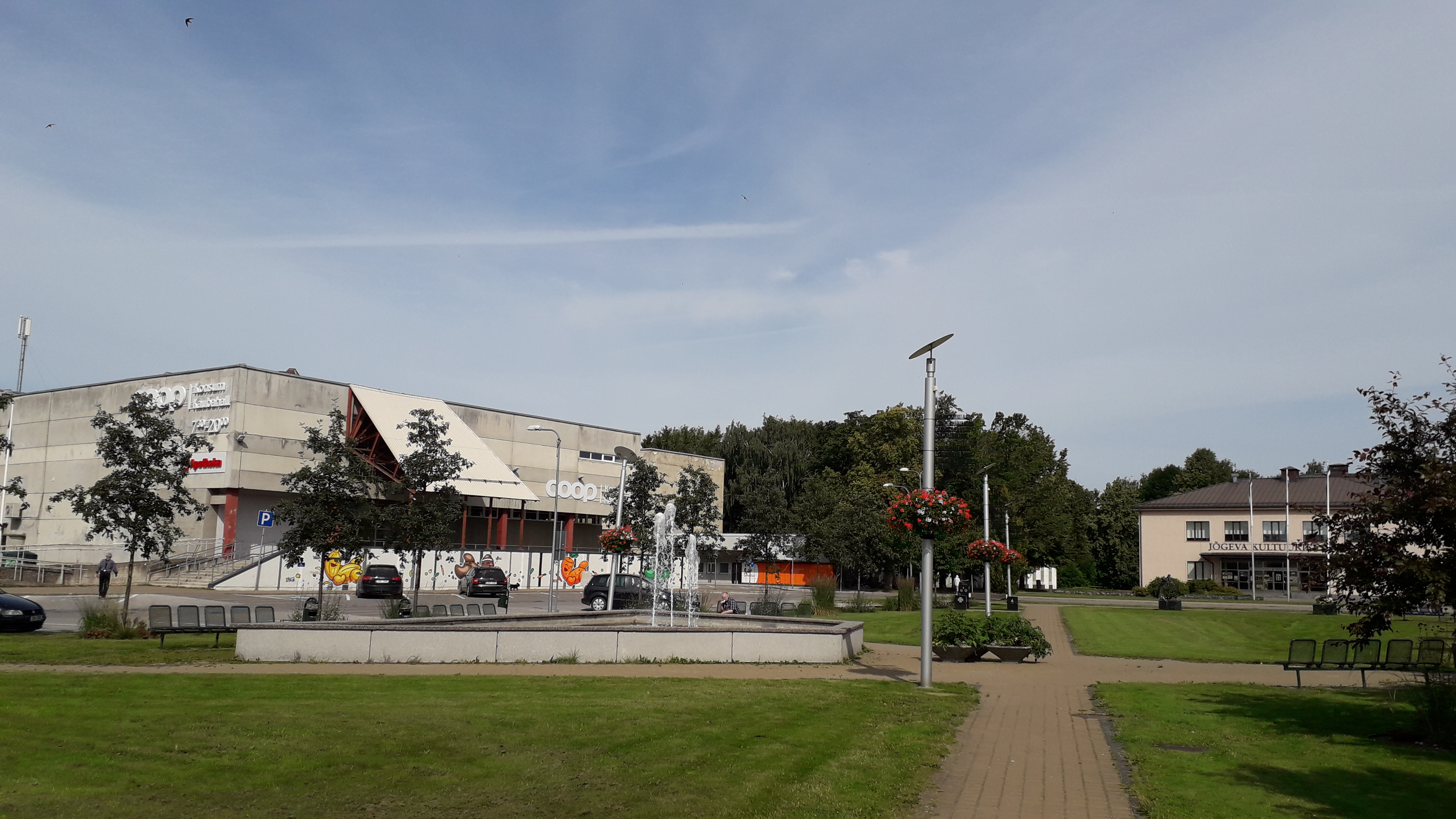
Jõgeva central square

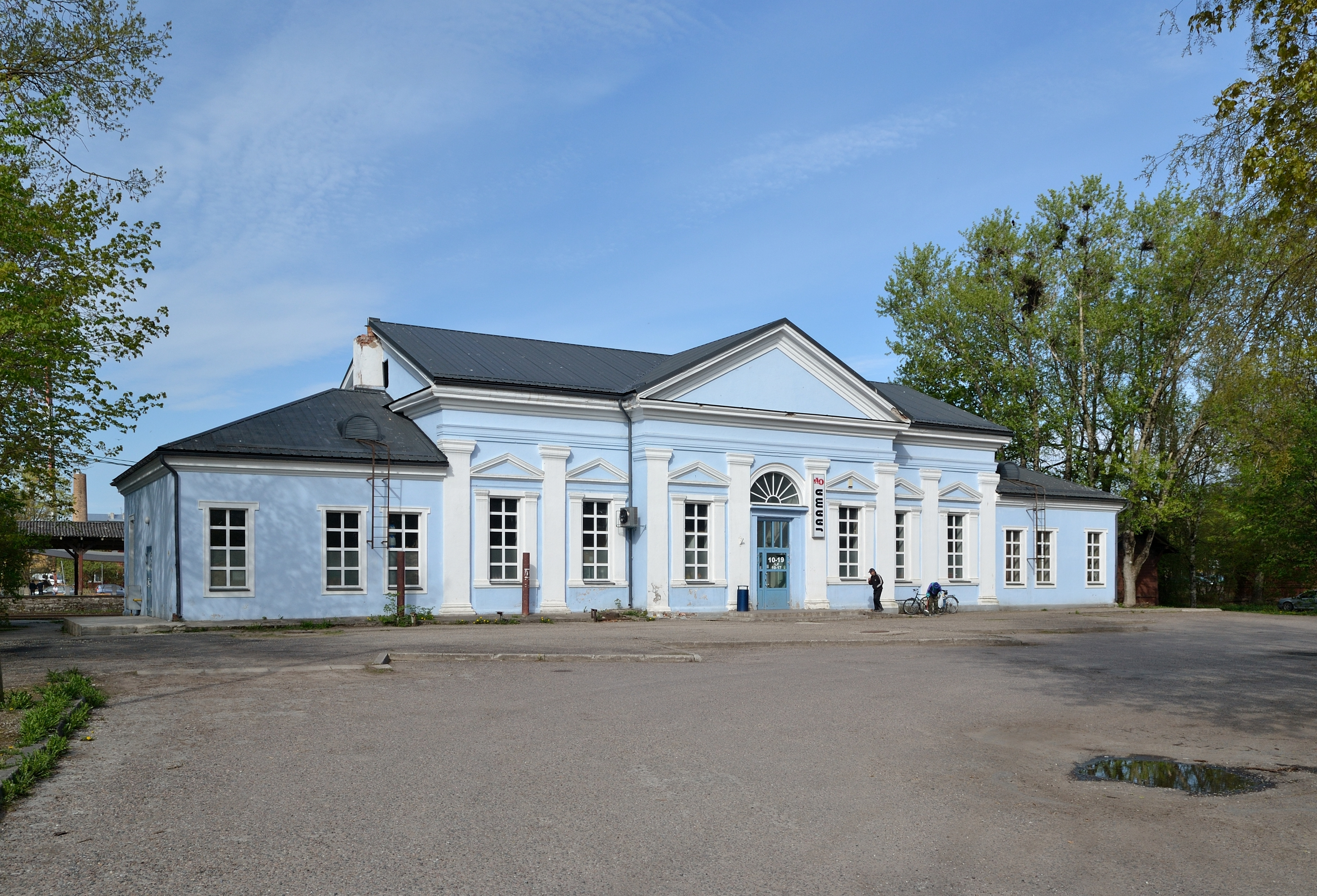
Old railway station

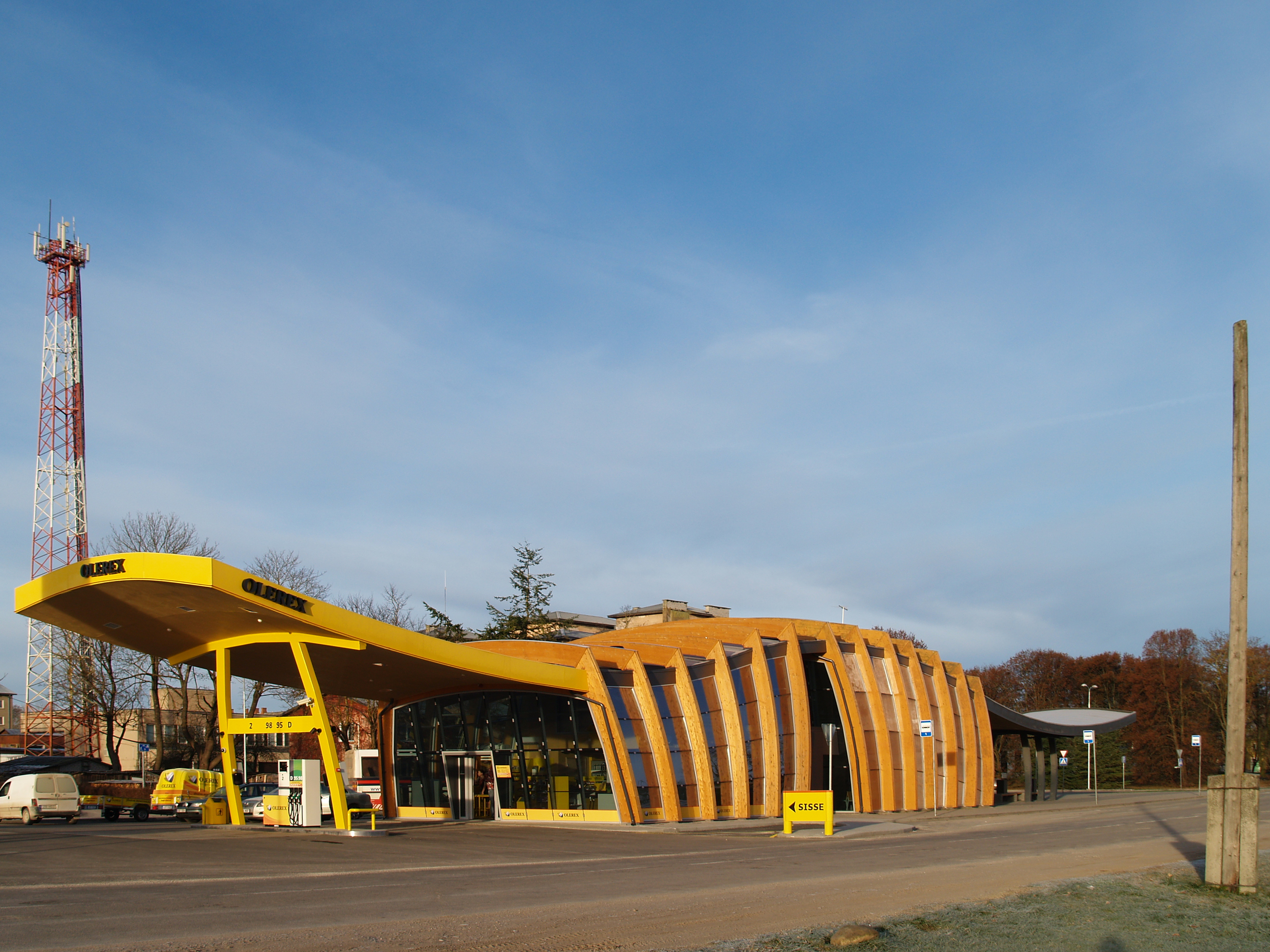
Bus station

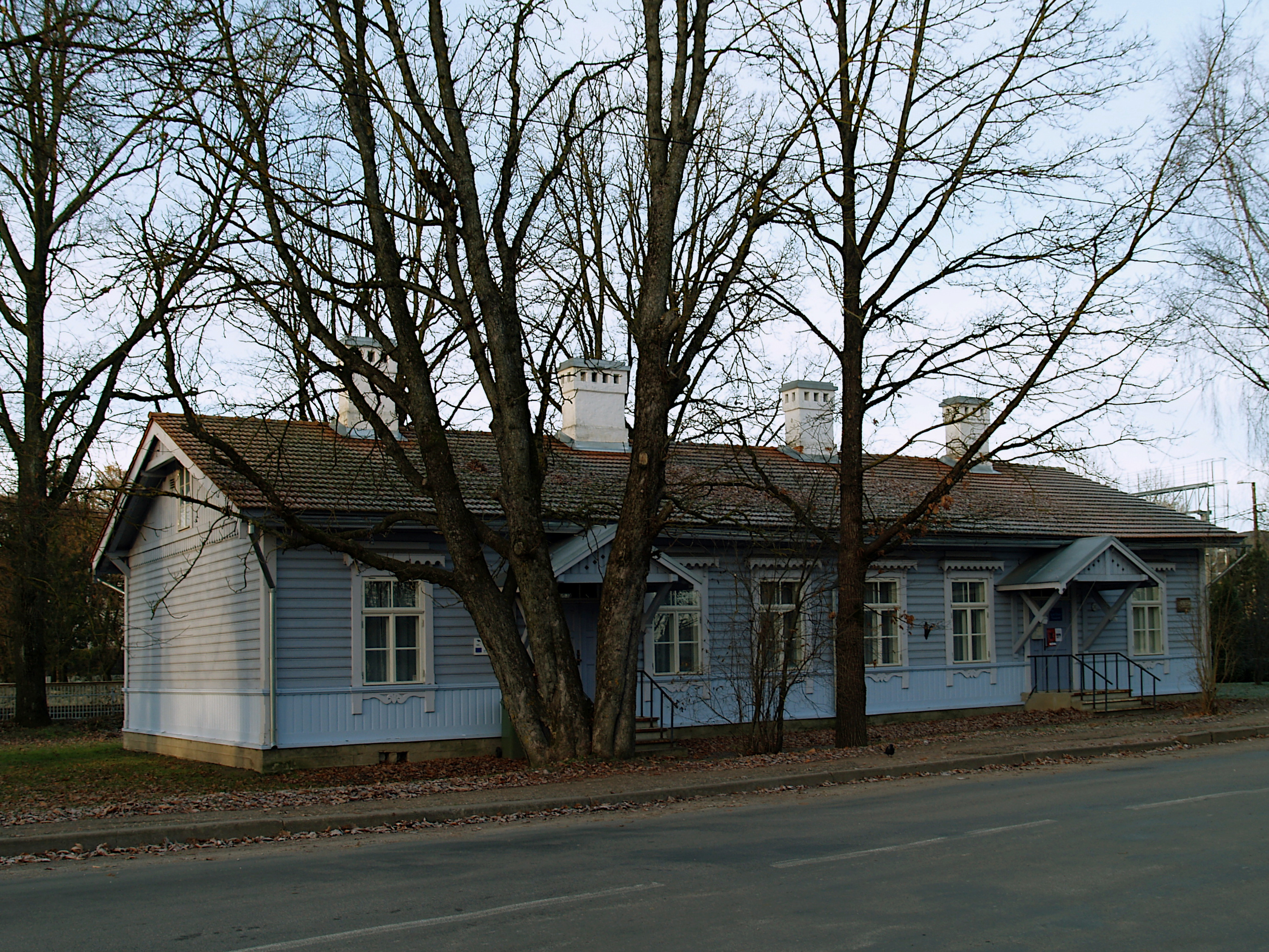
Betti Alver museum

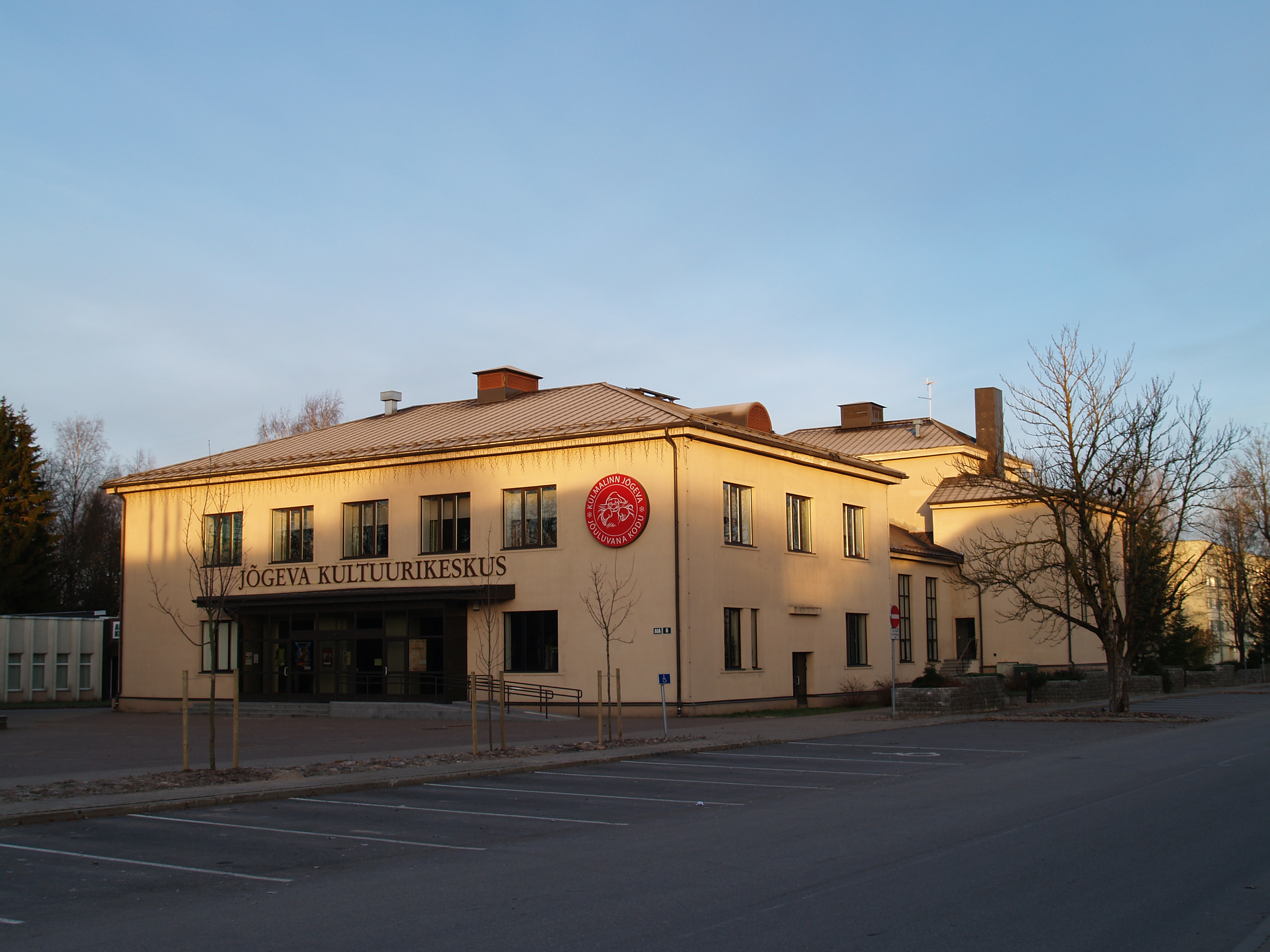
Cultural center

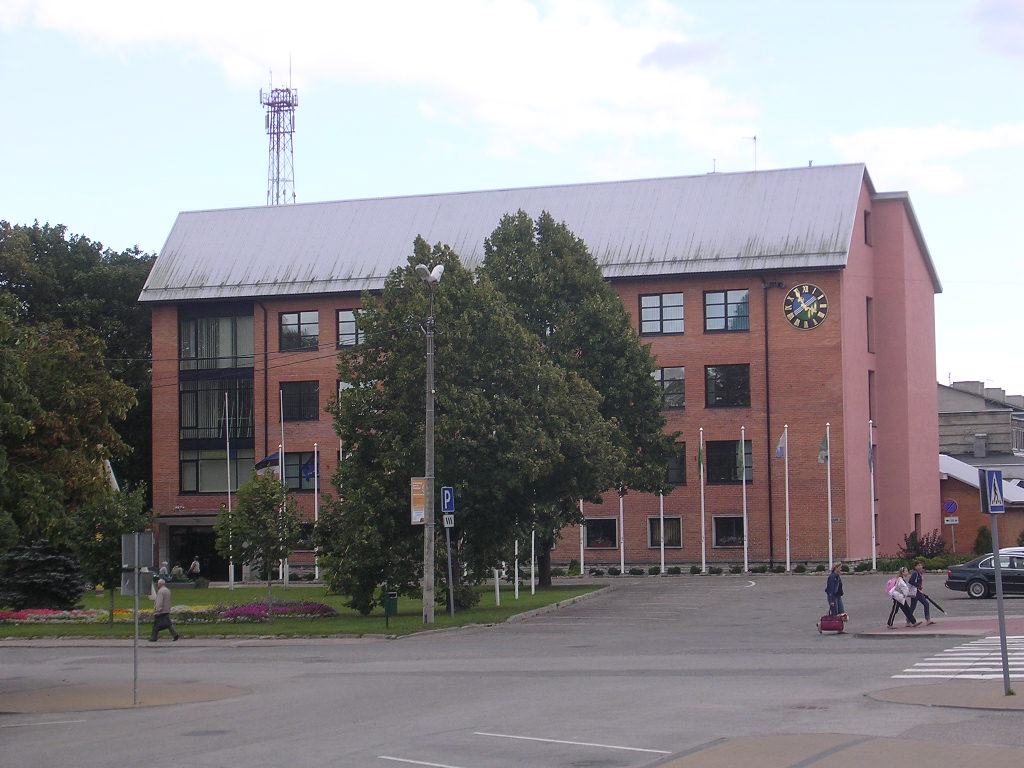
Jõgeva County government building

== Notable people ==
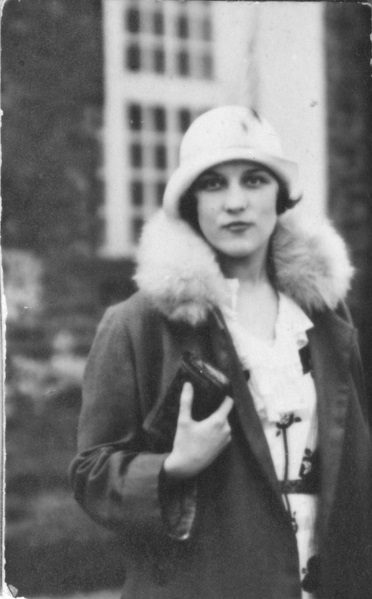
Betti Alver, 1930's

List of people who were born in or lived in Jõgeva

- Leopold Hansen (1879 in Iravere – 1964), actor and theater director, lived in Jõgeva as a child
- Betti Alver (1906 – 1989), poet
- Mati Meos (born 1946), engineer and politician
- Luule Viilma (1950 – 2002), physician, esotericist and parapsychologist
- Igor Volke (born 1950), ufologist and author
- Aire Koop (born 1957), actress
- Alo Mattiisen (1961 – 1996), musician and composer
- Martin Algus (born 1973), actor, screenwriter, playwright and translator
- Tiit Sukk (born 1974), stage, TV, voice, and film actor, director and television presenter.
- Alo Kõrve (born 1978), stage, film, and TV actor.
- Hele Kõrve (born 1980), stage, TV, film and voice actress and singer.

=== Sport ===
- Ain Evard (born 1962) high jumper
- Erki Pütsep (born 1976), road bicycle racer
- Vallo Allingu (born 1978), basketball player
- Alar Varrak (born 1982), basketball player and coach
- Saskia Alusalu (born 1994), speed skater, national flag bearer at the 2018 Winter Olympics.
- Getriin Strigin (born 1996), football goalkeeper, played 21 games for Estonia women
- Robin Kool (born 1999), aka "ropz", esports player
- Aleksandr Selevko (born 2001), figure skater

== See also ==
- Jõgeva SK Noorus-96
- FC Jõgeva Wolves
