= Orthotonophonium =

Microtonal harmonium

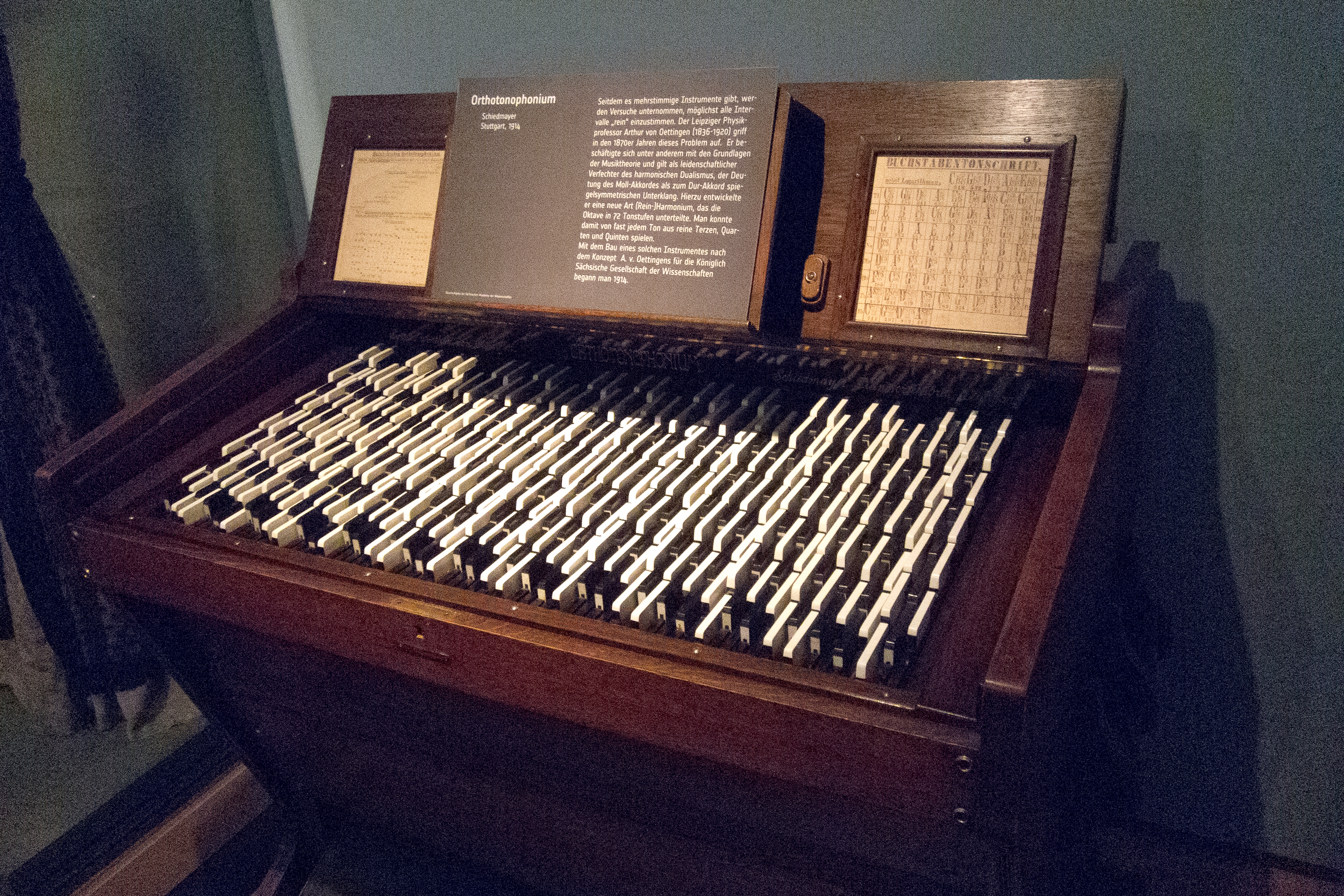
- A 1914 Orthotonophonium in the Museum of Musical Instruments of Leipzig University
- Classification: Aerophone
- Hornbostel–Sachs classification: 412.132
- Inventor: Arthur von Oettingen
- Developed: 1914

Related instruments
- Harmonium, Reed organ

The orthotonophonium is a free reed aerophone similar to a harmonium with 72 (sometimes 53) keys per octave, that can be played all diatonic key intervals and chords using just intonation. The instrument was created in 1914 by German physicist Arthur von Oettingen to advance his theories of harmonic dualism.

== Etymology ==
The word "orthotonophonium" is a portmanteau of the Greek words ορθός ("correct"), τόνος ("tone"), and φωνή ("sound").

== Development ==
German physicist Arthur von Oettingen became interested in microtonal tuning in the 1870s, later developing the idea for a harmonium using 72 or 53 keys, with almost any chord using thirds, fourths, and fifths. The first orthotonophonium was built in 1914 by German instrument manufacturer Schiedmayer.

== Functionality ==
When playing in equal temperament, beats are unavoidable due to the Pythagorean comma. This interference can be avoided playing on an orthotonophonium, since the pitch of a tone can be chosen such that only pure intervals are played. This is achieved by using a different tuning system - 72TET. Unlike a piano, where there are only twelve keys per octave, on an orthotonophonium, the player has the choice of several pitches per tone. This eliminates enharmonics, since for example, a G♯ can be altered several cents higher than an A♭.
