= Getriin Strigin =

Estonian footballer

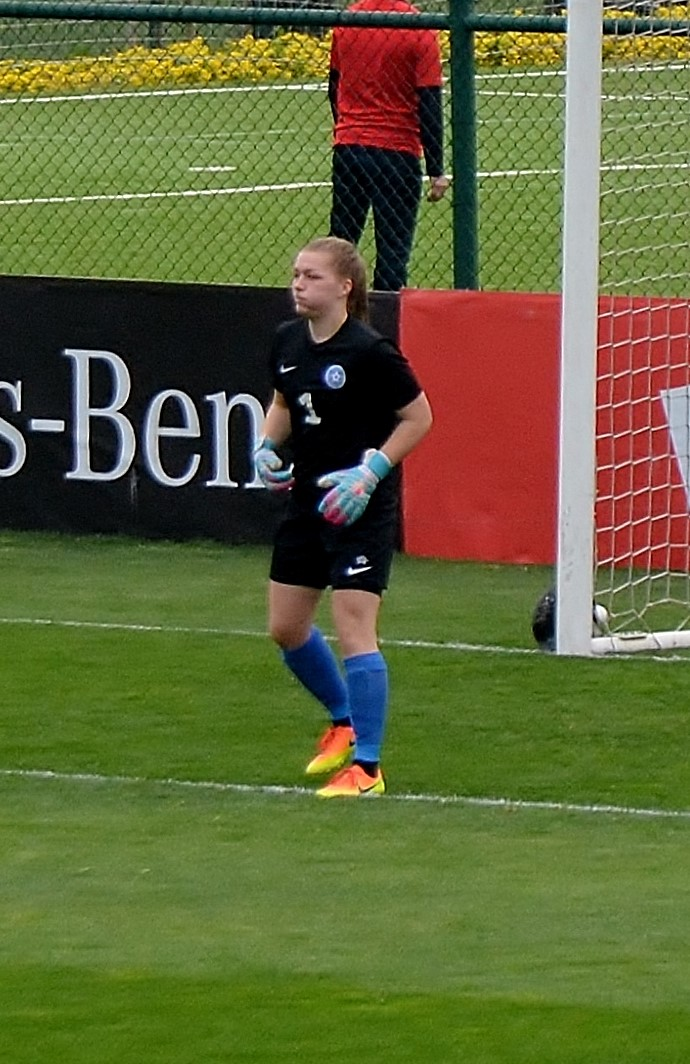

Personal information
- Full name: Getriin Strigin
- Date of birth: 7 July 1996 (age 30)
- Place of birth: Jõgeva, Estonia
- Position: Goalkeeper

Team information
- Current team: FC Wacker Innsbruck

Senior career*
Years	Team	Apps	(Gls)
2010	Tartu SK 10 Premium (II)	18	(3)
2011	Tartu SK 10 Premium		
2013	FC Ülenurme (II)	12	(0)
2014	FC Flora Tallinn II	2	(0)
2014–2016	FC Flora	46	(0)
2017	Granada CF		
2017–2020	FC Flora	22	(0)
2021–	FC Wacker Innsbruck		

International career^{‡}
2012–2013	Estonia U17	3	(0)
2013–2014	Estonia U19	21	(0)
2016–	Estonia	21	(0)
- * Club domestic league appearances and goals as of 2018 ‡ National team caps and goals as of 11 August 2019

Getriin Strigin (born 7 July 1996) is an Estonian football goalkeeper who currently plays for FC Wacker Innsbruck and the Estonian women's national football team.

== Honours ==
FC Flora

- Naiste Meistriliiga: 2018
- Estonian Women's Cup: 2018, 2019
- Estonian Women's Supercup: 2018, 2019
