= Visusti =

Village in Estonia

Coordinates: 58°37′31″N 26°30′57″E

- Village
- Interactive map of Visusti
- Country: Estonia
- County: Jõgeva County
- Parish: Jõgeva Parish
- Time zone: UTC+2 (EET)
  - Summer (DST): UTC+3 (EEST)

Visusti (German: Wissust) is a village in Jõgeva Parish, Jõgeva County in eastern Estonia. Prior to the 2017 administrative reform of local governments in Estonia, the village belonged to Palamuse Parish.

Physician and ophthalmologist Georg von Oettingen (1824–1916) and theologian and statistician Alexander von Oettingen (1827–1905) were born in Visusti Manor. Actor Ago Roo (born 1946) was born in Visusti.
