= Millioctave =

Unit of measurement for musical intervals

The millioctave (moct) is a unit of measurement for musical intervals. As is expected from the prefix milli-, a millioctave is defined as 1/1000 of an octave. From this it follows that one millioctave is equal to the ratio 2^{1/1000}, the 1000th root of 2, or approximately 1.0006934.

Given two frequencies a and b, the measurement of the interval between them in millioctaves can be calculated by

$$n = 1000 \log_2 \left( \frac{a}{b} \right) \approx 3322 \log_{10} \left( \frac{a}{b} \right)$$

Likewise, if you know a note b and the number n of millioctaves in the interval, then the other note a may be calculated by:

$$a = b \times 2 ^ \frac{n}{1000}$$

Like the more common cent, the millioctave is a linear measure of intervals, and thus the size of intervals can be calculated by adding their millioctave values, instead of multiplication, which is necessary for calculations of frequencies.

A millioctave is exactly 1.2 cents.

== History and use ==
The millioctave was introduced by the German physicist Arthur von Oettingen in his book Das duale Harmoniesystem (1913). The invention goes back to John Herschel, who proposed a division of the octave into 1000 parts, which was published (with appropriate credit to Herschel) in George Biddell Airy's book on musical acoustics.

Compared to the cent, the millioctave has not been as popular because it is not aligned with just intervals. It is however occasionally used by authors who wish to avoid the close association between the cent and twelve-tone equal temperament. Some considers that the millioctave introduces as well a bias for the less familiar 10-tone equal temperament however this bias is common in the decimal system.

== See also ==
- Cent (music)
- Savart
- Musical tuning
- Logarithm
- Degree (angle)
- Chiliagon
