= Eduard Raehlmann =

German ophthalmologist (1848–1917)

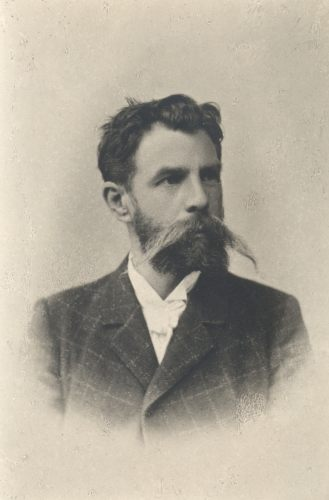
Eduard Raehlmann (1848-1917)

Eduard Raehlmann (19 March 1848, Ibbenbüren – 1 September 1917, Weimar) was a German ophthalmologist.

He studied medicine at the Universities of Würzburg and Halle, obtaining his doctorate at the latter institution in 1872. In 1875, he received his habilitation at the University of Strassburg, and in 1879 succeeded Georg von Oettingen as professor of ophthalmology at the Imperial University of Dorpat. After 1900, he worked as a private scholar in Weimar.

His primary work dealt with anatomical and pathological investigations of the cornea, as well as studies involving amyloid degeneration of conjunctiva and research of retinal detachment. In the Baltic states, he was at the forefront in the fight against trachoma. At Weimar, he conducted research of color perception and color photography.

== Published works ==
- Über Farbenempfindung in den peripherischen Netzhautparthieen in Bezug auf normale und pathologische Brechungszustande, 1872
- Über die neuropathologische Bedeutung der Pupillenweite, 1880
- Über Trachom, 1885
- Über Mikrophthalmos, Coloboma oculi und Hemimicrosoma, 1897
- Über den Heilwerth der Therapie bei Trachom, 1898
- Über Farbensehen und Malerei; eine kunstphysiologische Abhandlung in allgemein versta¨dlicher, 1901.
