= Georg von Oettingen =

Baltic German medical scientist

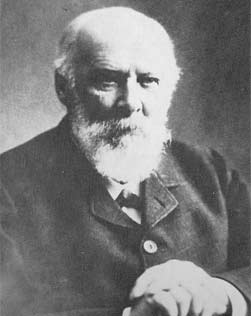
- Born: 22 November [O.S. 10 November] 1824; Wissust Manor, Wissust, Kreis Dorpat, Governorate of Livonia, Russian Empire (in present-day Visusti, Jõgeva County, Estonia)
- Died: 16 February [O.S. 3 February] 1916 (aged 91); Ecks, Yuryev Uyezd, Governorate of Livonia, Russian Empire (present-day Äksi, Tartu County, Estonia)
- Education: Imperial University of Dorpat
- Scientific career
- Fields: Ophthalmology

Georg Philipp von Oettingen (22 November [O.S. 10 November] 1824 – 16 February [O.S. 3 February] 1916) was a Baltic German physician and ophthalmologist. He was a brother of theologian Alexander von Oettingen (1827–1905), and physicist Arthur von Oettingen (1836–1920).

In 1848 he received his medical doctorate from the Imperial University of Dorpat, and until 1853 was a physician at the city hospital in Riga. For a short period of time he practiced medicine in St. Petersburg, and in 1854 returned to Dorpat, where in 1856 he became head of the University Hospital. In 1857 he was appointed professor of surgery, and in 1871 became a professor of ophthalmology.

From 1859 to 1866 he was vice-rector at the University of Dorpat, becoming dean of the medical faculty in 1866, and serving as rector from 1868 to 1876. In 1879, Eduard Raehlmann (1848-1917) succeeded him as professor of ophthalmology at Dorpat.

Oettingen is credited for providing the first comprehensive description of amyloid degeneration of the eye's conjunctiva.

== Selected publications ==
- De ratione, qua calomelas mutetur in tractu intestinali : Dissertatio Inauguralis, Dorpat 1848.
- Mitteilungen aus der chirurgischen Abtheilung der Universitätsklinik zu Dorpat betreffend das Jahr (Notes concerning surgical healing at the University Hospital Dorpat in 1856), Dorpat 1857.
- Populäre Anleitung zur Pflege und Behandlung der unter der ländlichen Bevölkerung in den Ostseeprovinzen Russlands, insbesondere in Livland am häufigsten vorkommenden Augenkrankheiten, (Popular guide to the care and treatment of the rural population in the Baltic Provinces in Russia, particularly in Livonia regarding common eye diseases), (with Hermann Guido von Samson-Himmelstjerna); Mitau 1860.
- Mittheilungen aus der chirurgisch-ophthalmiatrischen Klinik in Dorpat, (Information from the surgical-ophthalmology clinic in Dorpat) : in St. Petersburger Medizinische Zeitschrift 8 (1865).
- Klinische Studien, (Clinical studies) in: St. Petersburger Medizinische Zeitschrift 11 (1866).
- Die ophtamologische Klinik Dorpat's in den ersten 3 Jahren ihres Bestehens, (The ophthalmological hospital at Dorpat in the first three years of its existence) in: Dorpater medizinische Zeitschrift 2 (1871).
- Zur Casuistik und Diagnostik der Orbitaltumoren, (Causes and diagnosis of orbital tumors) in: Klinisches Monatsblatt für Augenheilkunde (1874).
- Die indirekten Läsionen des Auges bei Schussverletzungen der Orbitalgegend, (Indirect lesions of the eye due to gunshot wounds in the orbital area); Stuttgart 1879.

== See also ==
- List of Baltic German scientists

Preceded by Hermann Guido von Samson-Himmelstjerna	Rector of the Imperial University of Dorpat; 1868–1876	Succeeded by Ottomar Meykov
Preceded by Carl Victor Kupffer	Mayor of Tartu; 1878–1891	Succeeded by Wilhelm Bock
