= Arthur von Oettingen =

Baltic German physicist (1836–1920)

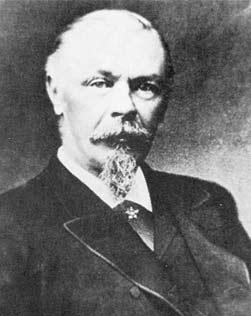
- Born: 28 March [O.S. 16 March] 1836; Ludenhof, Governorate of Livonia, Russian Empire
- Died: 5 September 1920 (aged 84); Bensheim, Hesse, Weimar Republic
- Resting place: Südfriedhof (Leipzig)
- Known for: Introducing the harmonic dualism and millioctave concept
- Relatives: Alexander von Oettingen (brother); Georg von Oettingen (brother)
- Scientific career
- Fields: Physics, musical theory
- Academic advisors: Antoine César Becquerel, Henri Victor Régnault, Heinrich Gustav Magnus, Johann Christian Poggendorff, Heinrich Wilhelm Dove

Arthur Joachim von Oettingen (28 March [O.S. 16 March] 1836 – 5 September 1920) was a Baltic German physicist and music theorist. He was the brother of theologian Alexander von Oettingen (1827–1905) and ophthalmologist Georg von Oettingen (1824–1916).

== Biography ==
He studied astronomy and physics at the Imperial University of Dorpat, and furthered his education of physics in Paris in the laboratories of Antoine César Becquerel (1788–1878) and Henri Victor Régnault (1810–1878), and afterwards at Berlin in the laboratories of Heinrich Gustav Magnus (1802–1870), Johann Christian Poggendorff (1796–1877) and Heinrich Wilhelm Dove (1803–1879).

In 1868 he became a professor at Dorpat, where he founded a meteorological observatory. In 1893 he moved to the University of Leipzig, where he remained until 1919 as a teacher and honorary professor. In 1898 and 1904 he published the third and fourth volumes of Poggendorff's Biographisch-Literarisches Handwörterbuch der exakten Naturwissenschaften.

Oettingen was a primary advocate of a theory of acoustical relationships known as "harmonic dualism". This concept was later expanded and elaborated on by musicologist Hugo Riemann (1849–1919). Oettingen is also credited for introducing a measurement of musical interval known as the millioctave. He later created a musical instrument, the Orthotonophonium - a pump organ using 72 notes per octave, to further advocate harmonic dualism.

== Selected works ==
- Harmoniesystem in dualer Entwicklung, Dorpat 1866.
- Meteorologische Beobachtungen angestellt in Dorpat im Jahre ..., Dorpat 1868–1877.
- Über den mathematischen Unterricht in der Schule, Dorpat 1873.
- Elemente des geometrisch-perspektivischen Zeichnens, Leipzig 1901.

== See also ==
- List of Baltic German scientists

== Sources ==
- Alexander Rehding (2003). Hugo Riemann and the Birth of Modern Musical Thought. Cambridge University Press. ISBN 0-521-82073-1.
