= Luule Viilma =

Estonian physician

- Born: 6 April 1950
- Died: 20 January 2002 (aged 51)

Luule Viilma (6 April 1950 – 20 January 2002) was an Estonian doctor, esotericist and practitioner of alternative medicine. She is best known for her parapsychological book series Teaching of Survival (Ellujäämise õpetus) which outlined her supposed methods of healing by thought.

== Biography ==
Viilma was born in Jõgeva and graduated from the Tartu State University in 1974 as a specialist of gynæcology. She practiced in Rapla Hospital and Haapsalu Hospital. In 1991, she started a private gynæcology practice. In the same year, she became acquainted with parapsychology, which led her to write extensively about supposed "thought healing" methods.

Viilma died in 2002 in a car crash near Kabli.
