= Jõgevatreff =

Annual meeting of motorcyclists in Estonia

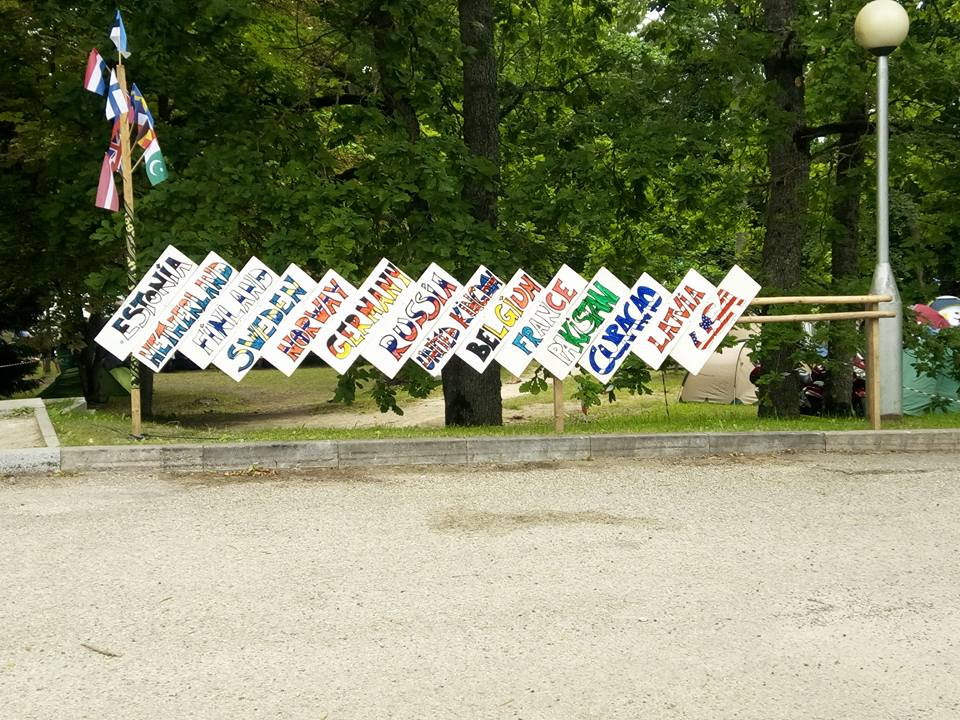
- The flags of the participants' home countries at the gate
- Dates: the last weekend of July
- Frequency: Annually
- Locations: Kuremaa, Estonia
- Founded: 1992
- Founder: Igor Ellisson
- Participants: International motorcyclists and bikers
- Attendance: Appr. 2000 visitors
- Organizer: Jõgeva MC
- Website: http://www.jogevamc.ee/

Jõgevatreff is an annual international meeting of motorcyclists in the settlement of Kuremaa in Jõgeva county; also the largest gathering of bikers in Estonia. The event is organized by the NGO Jõgeva MC.

== History ==
The first event took place in 1992 by the lake Peipus, it was organized for the first time by a legendary local motorcycle enthusiast Igor Ellisson (10. VI 1954 – 11. VII 2021), Jõgeva county citizen of the year 2012, In 2009, he was awarded the Silver Cross of Jõgeva County (Estonian: Jõgevamaa Hõberist) and in 2011 the Order of the White Star.

== Organization ==
The event traditionally takes place on the last weekend of July and lasts for several days. The first participants arrive already on Thursday. Tickets are sold both in advance and on the spot. The territory is fenced with a mesh fence and secured throughout the event. There is a guest house and a swimming center complex where the showers can be used from morning until night with a sauna in the evening.

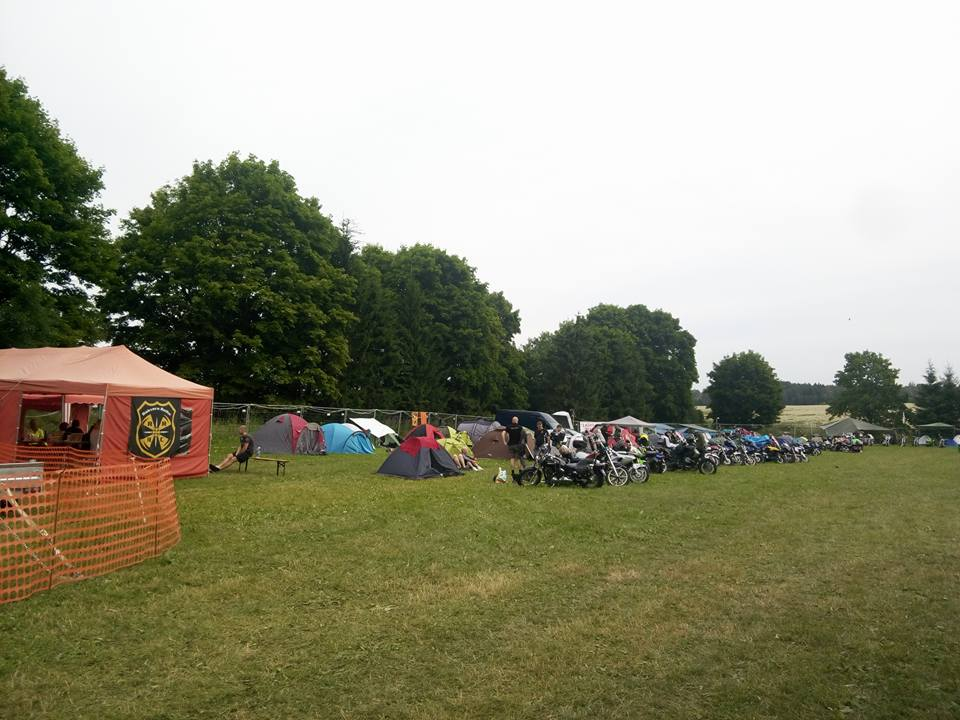

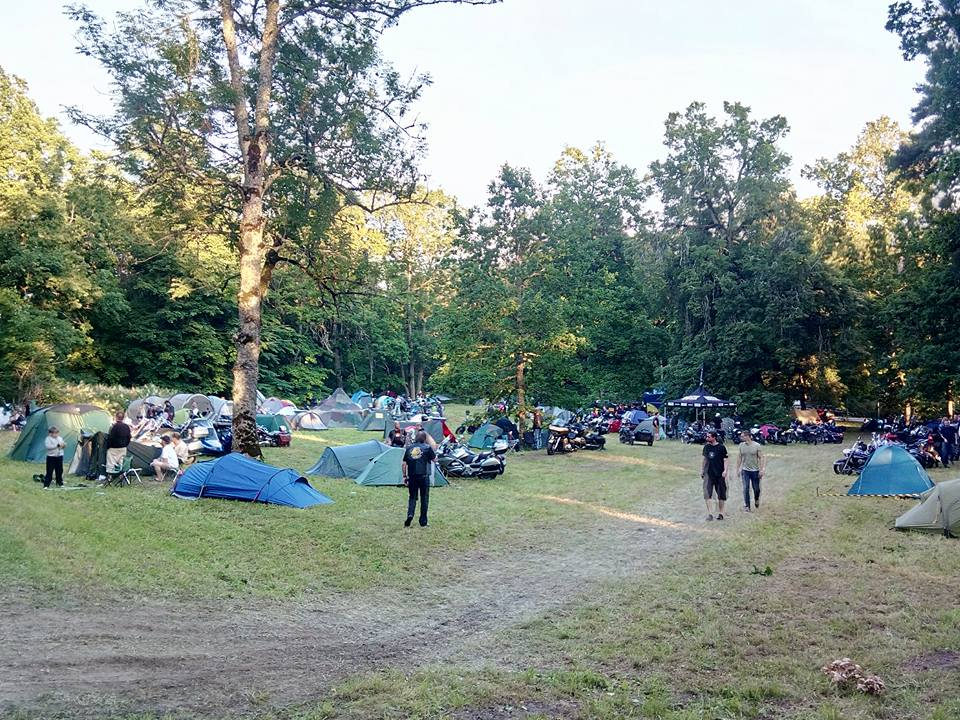

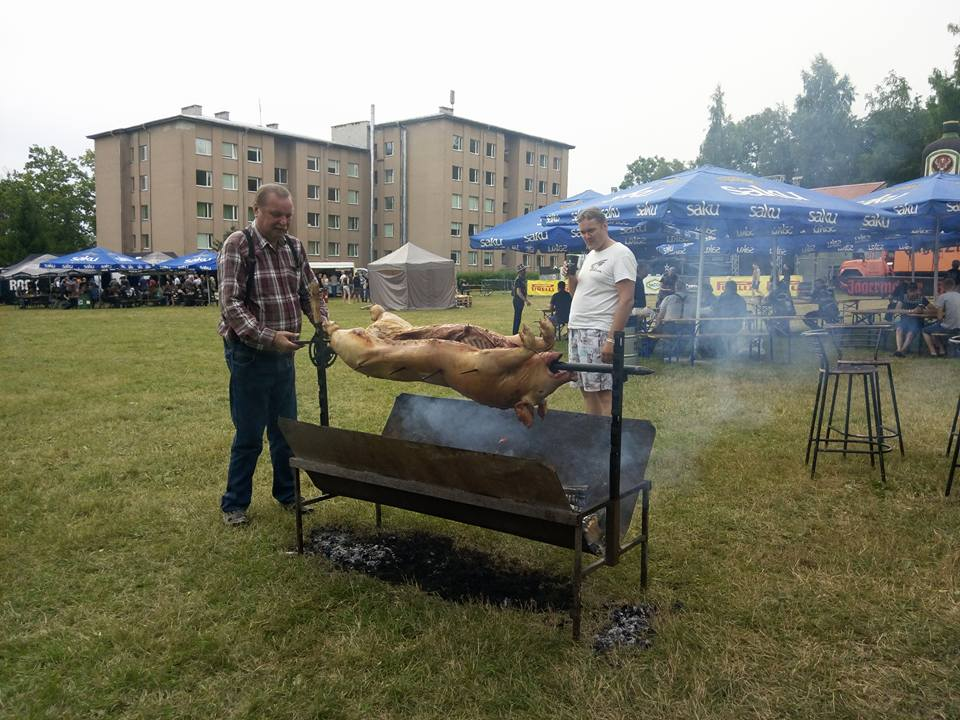

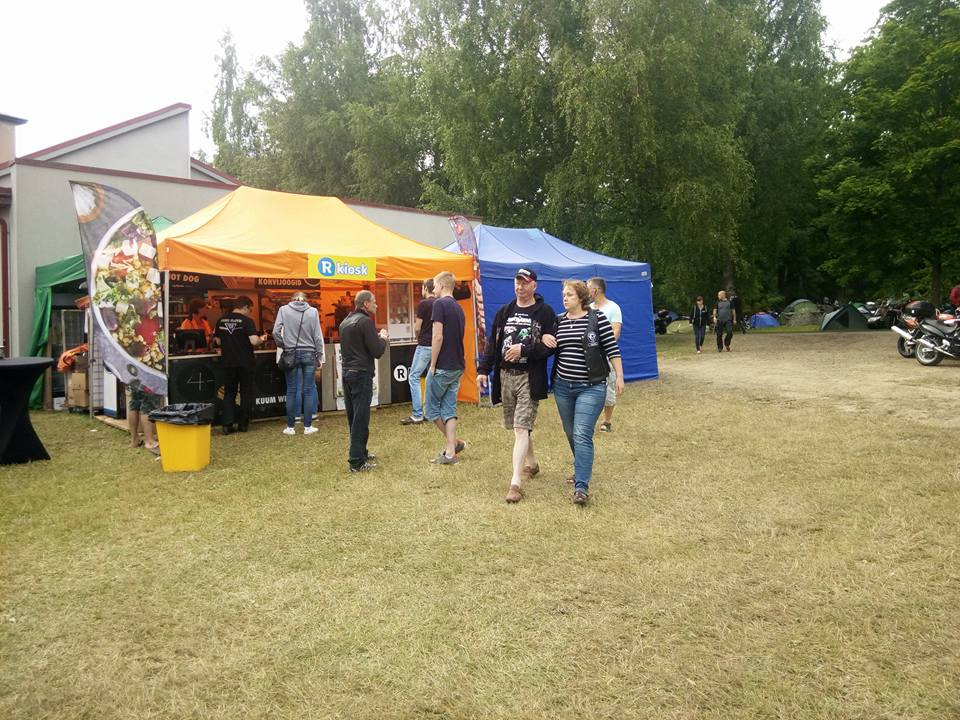

== Media coverage ==
national television coverage Kanal 2 2009, 2013 ERR Aktuaalne kaamera 2013, 2014, 2016, and press Õhtuleht 1997, 1998, 1999, 2006, 2010, 2012, 2016, 2020, 2021 Vooremaa.2014 Postimees 2020, 2021, 2022
