= Mooritsa =

Village in Estonia

- Village
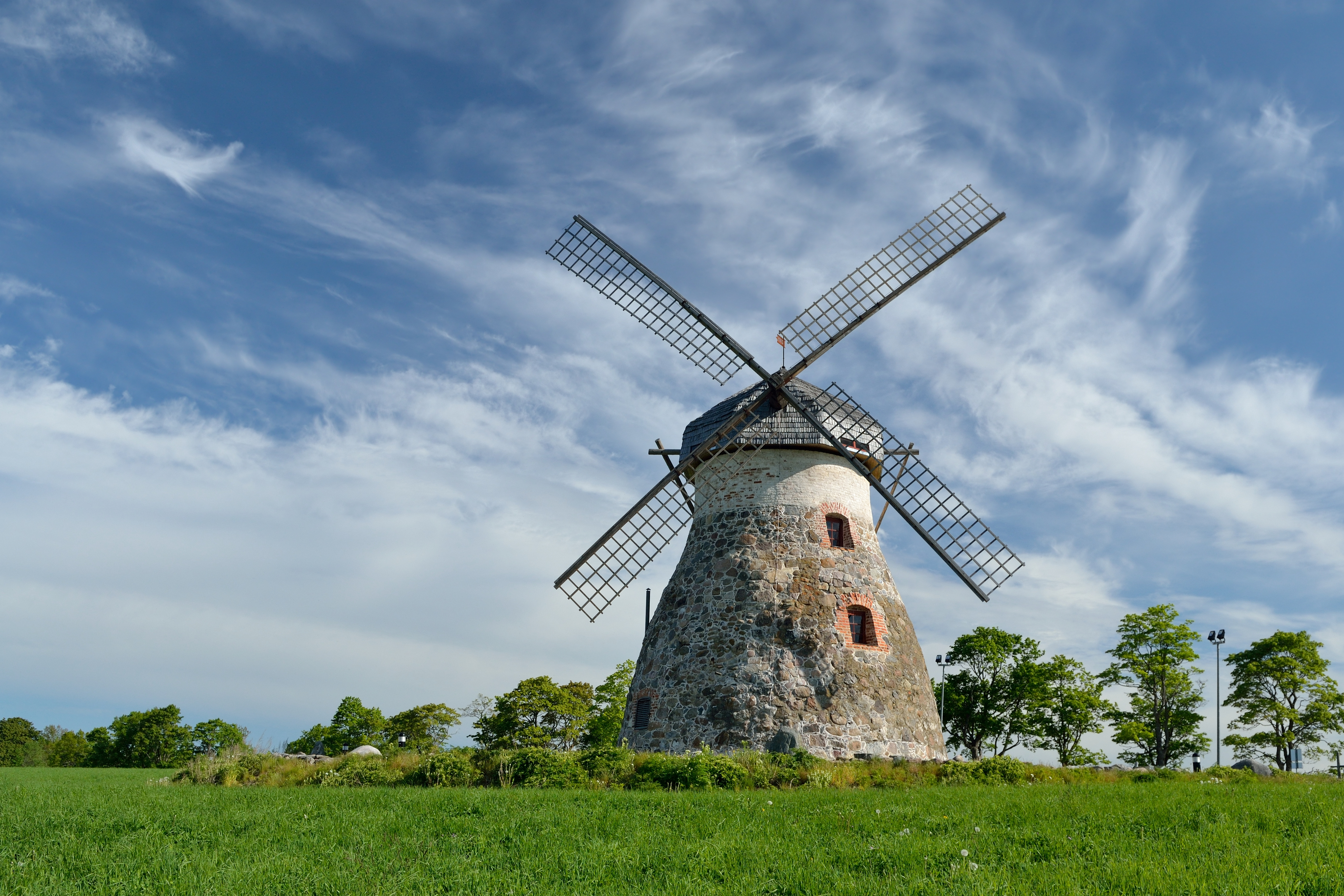
- Kuremaa manor windmill in Mooritsa
- Interactive map of Mooritsa
- Coordinates: 58°43′44″N 26°30′31″E
- Country: Estonia
- County: Jõgeva County
- Parish: Jõgeva Parish
- Time zone: UTC+2 (EET)
  - Summer (DST): UTC+3 (EEST)

Mooritsa (German: Moritzhof) is a village in Jõgeva Parish, Jõgeva County in eastern Estonia.
