= Kooraste =

Village in Estonia

Coordinates: 57°58′N 26°39′E

- Village
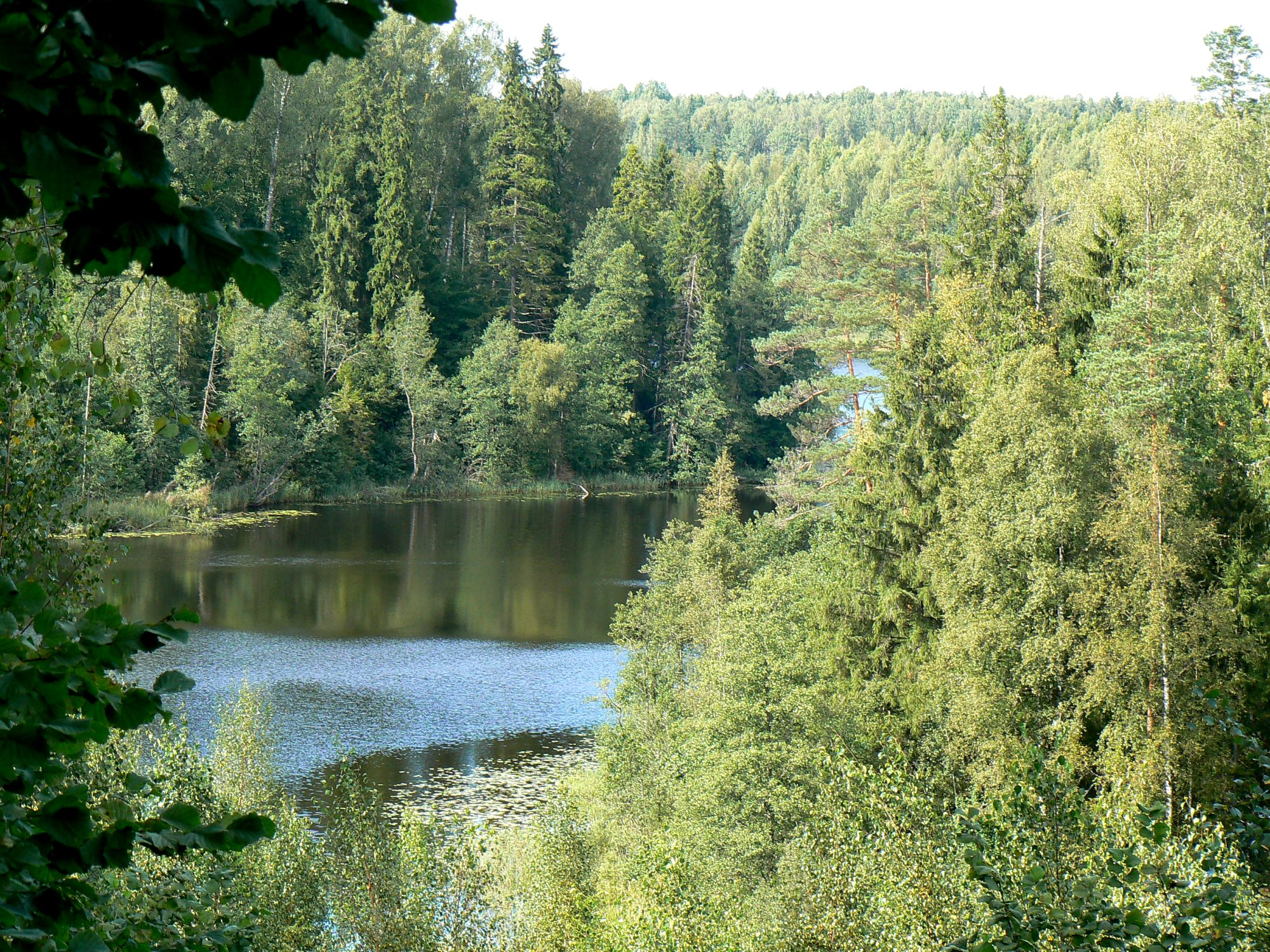
- Pikkjärv, a lake in Kooraste
- Interactive map of Kooraste
- Country: Estonia
- County: Põlva County
- Parish: Kanepi Parish
- Time zone: UTC+2 (EET)
  - Summer (DST): UTC+3 (EEST)

Kooraste is a village in Kanepi Parish, Põlva County in southeastern Estonia.

The physician Hermann Guido von Samson-Himmelstjerna (1809–1868) was born in Kooraste.
