= Aidi Vallik =

Estonian writer

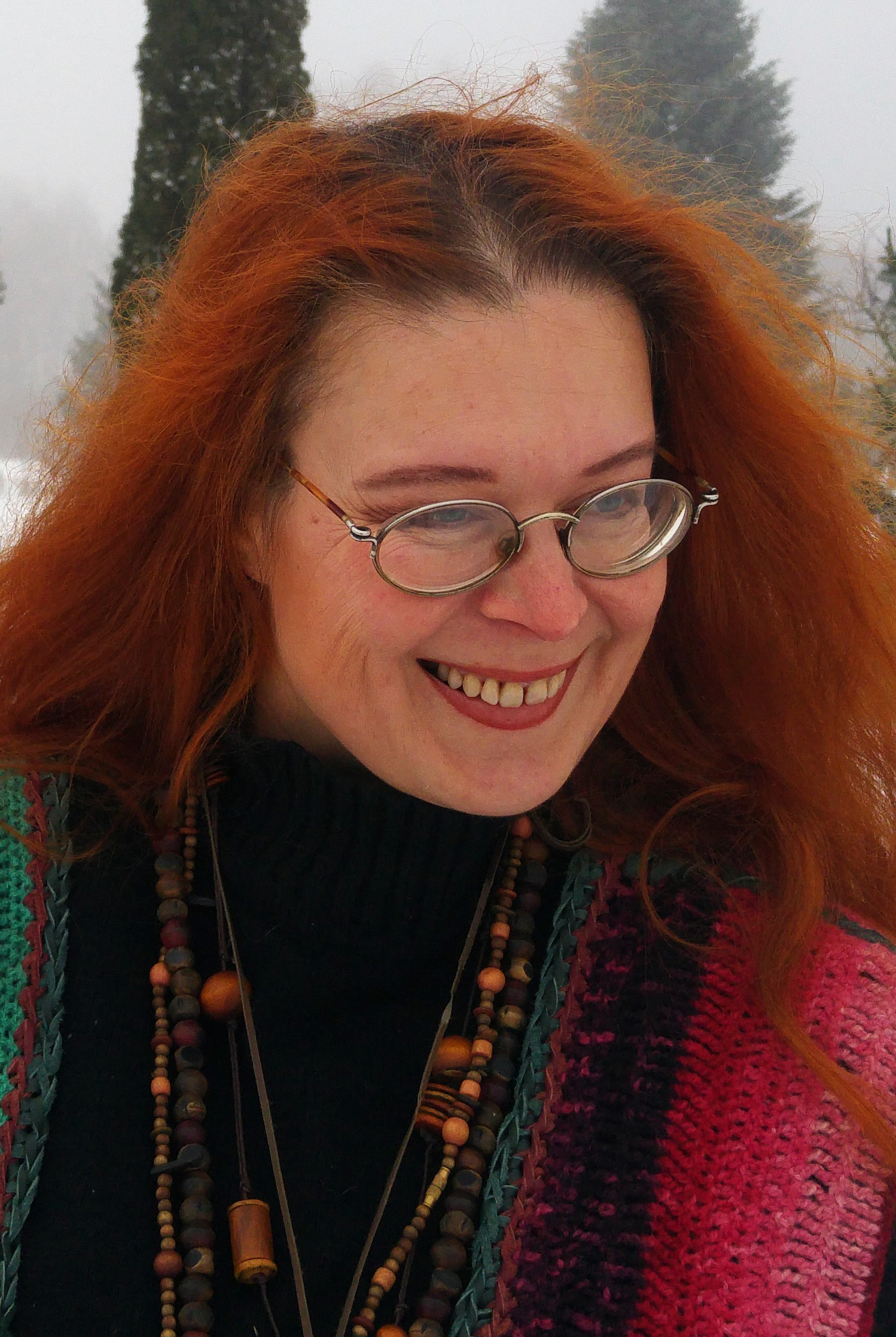
Aidi Vallik in 2017

Aidi Vallik (born 11 May 1971) is an Estonian children's author, poet, playwright, translator, columnist and screenwriter.

== Biography ==
She graduated from University of Tartu, studying Estonian philology.

She has written over 20 books for children and young adults. Her most known works are young-adult novels about a girl named Ann (published 2001–2007).
