= Maydell =

Maydell is a surname. Notable people with the name include:

- Anna von Maydell (1861–1944), German-Baltic artist and metal beater
- Ernst von Maydell (administrator) (1767–1843), Estonian Landrat
- Ernst von Maydell (1888–1960), German-Baltic graphic designer
- Bernd Baron von Maydell (1934–2018), German lawyer and university professor in social law.
- Eva Maydell (born 1986), Bulgarian politician
- Sabine von Maydell (born 1955), German television actress
- Eveline Adelheid von Maydell (née Frank, 1890–1962), German silhouette artist
- Viktor von Maydell (1833–1898), Baltic German railway engineer and former mayor of Reval (now Tallinn)

== See also ==
- House of Maydell
