= House of Maydell =

Baltic German noble family

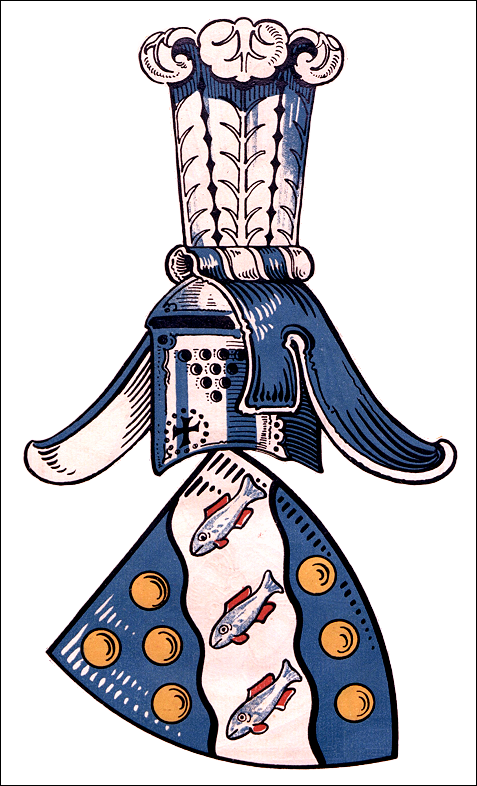
Coat of arms of Maydell

Maydell is the name of a Baltic-German noble family and part of the Uradel. The family lived in Estonia for several centuries and was one of its notable families. In documents and texts from earlier centuries, the family name is occasionally written Maydel or Maidel.

== People ==
- Gertrud Maydell, mentioned 1554–1559, abbess of St. Michael's Abbey in Reval (now Tallinn).
- Tönnies Maydell (d 1600), admiral of the Swedish fleet, Landrat, first knight's captain in the history of the Estonian Knighthood, 1593–1598
- Jürgen Maydell (d 22 July 1637), Landrat, Swedish statthalter at Schloss Lohde in Estonia
- Hermann Maydell († vor 1642), Polish Chamberlain, President of the Landrat Collegium in the Courland diocese of Pilten
- Otto Ernst von Maydell (1608–1670), Polish Obristleutnant, Starost of Pilten, hereditary Lord of Zierau, Pundicken, Rawen and Birsen, Lord of Punia and Schloss Dondangen in Courland
- Georg Johann Freiherr von Maydell (1648–1710), Swedish general of infantry, Swedish Freiherr from 26 June 1693
- Otto Wulbrand von Maydell (1680–1747), Electoral Hanoverian lieutenant general
- Otto Johann Freiherr von Maydell (1682– nach 1736), Swedish and Russian major general
- Carl August von Maydell (1733–1802), Electoral Hanoverian lieutenant general
- Ernst von Maydell (administrator) (1767–1843), Estonian Landrat
- Reinhard Gottlieb von Maydell (1771–1846), Estonian Landrat and Consistorial President
- August Baron von Maydell (1787–1869), Russian lieutenant general
- Georg Gustav Baron von Maydell (1791–1876), actual Staatsrat, President of the Courland Cameral Court, Vice-Governor of Courland
- Friedrich Ludwig von Maydell (1795–1846), historical painter, friend and travelling companion of Ludwig Richter in Italy.
- Karl Baron von Maydell (1798–1856), Russian major general
- Karl Anton Baron von Maydell (1816–1885), Russian lieutenant general of artillery
- Georg Benedikt Baron von Maydell (1817–1881), Russian general, commander of Peter and Paul Fortress in St. Petersburg
- Peter von Maydell (1819–1884), doctor, reformer of hygiene in Saint Petersburg
- Gregor Baron von Maydell (1821–1876), Russian rear admiral
- Eduard Baron von Maydell (1830–1899), Russian chamberlain and state councillor, knight’s captain in the Estonian Knighthood 1871–1878 and 1890–1892
- Eduard Baron von Maydell (1842–1918), Russian major general
- Christoph Baron von Maydell (1834– ), Russian major general
- Gerhard Baron von Maydell (1835–1894), geographer and ethnologist, researcher of East Siberia
- Viktor Baron von Maydell (1838–1898), railway engineer, town councillor (Stadtverordneter) in Reval from 1877, Stadtrat from 1880, Stadthaupt (Bürgermeister = mayor) of Reval 1885–1893
- Reinhold (Roman) Baron von Maydell (1859–1931), Russian major general,
- Ignaz Baron von Maydell (1864–1930), Russian Lieutenant general, Prof. der Chemie an der Universität Laibach
- Anna von Maydell (1861–1944), Baltic-German artist and metalbeater
- Wladimir Baron von Maydell (1864–1919), Russian lieutenant general, Commander of the Persian Cossack Brigade from 1915 to 1917, last adjutant of Czar Nicholas II.
- Ernst von Maydell (1888–1960), German-Baltic graphic designer and artist
- Eveline von Maydell (1890–1962), German silhouette artist
- Hans-Jürgen Baron von Maydell (1932–2010), German forestry scientist
- Bernd Baron von Maydell (1934–2018), German social and employment lawyer and professor
- Sabine von Maydell (* 1955), German actress
- Oona von Maydell (* 1985), German actress
