= Voldemar Lender =

Estonian politician and engineer (1876–1939)

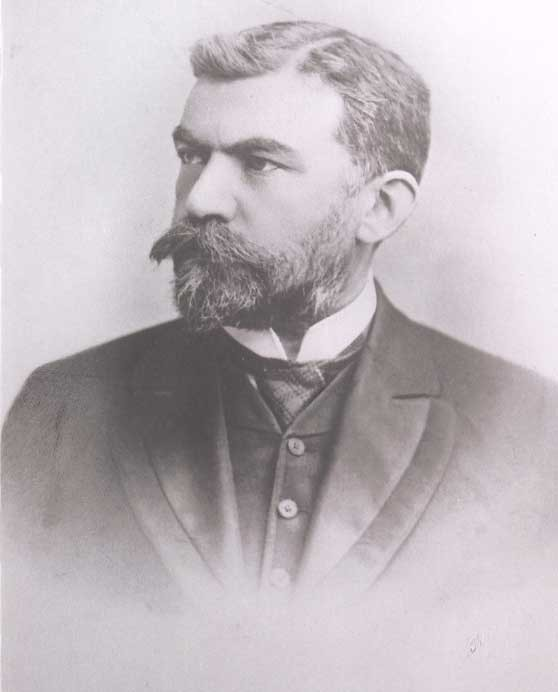
- Lender in 1906

Mayor of Tallinn
- In office 1906–1913
- Preceded by: Eugen Edmund Eduard Erbe
- Succeeded by: Jaan Poska

Personal details
- Born: 1 March 1876 Reval, Russian Empire (modern-day Tallinn, Estonia)
- Died: 30 September 1939 (aged 63) Tallinn, Estonia
- Spouse: Elfriede Lender (née Meikov)
- Children: Ilka, Juta, Henno, Uno
- Education: St. Petersburg Institute of Technology

Voldemar Lender (1 March [O.S. 18 February] 1876 in Tallinn, Estonia – 30 September 1939 in Tallinn) was an Estonian engineer who was the mayor of Tallinn (or Reval at that time) from 1906 to 1913, notably being the first ethnic Estonian to become the mayor of Tallinn.

== Biography ==
Lender was born to a family who owned a construction company. He first studied at Tallinn's Alexander Gymnasium, later attending the Saint Petersburg State University's Department of Physics and Mathematics from 1896 to 1897, then later attending the St. Petersburg Institute of Technology from 1897 to 1902. After graduating from the latter, he worked as an engineer at the Dvigatel wagon factory in Tallinn until 1906, a lucrative position for the time.

In 1904, Lender was elected as a city councilor in Tallinn. From 1906 to 1913, he was the mayor of Tallinn while also working at the city's construction department. He primarily tackled issues concerning the economic and communal affairs of the increasingly urbanized population of the city. He was the first ethnic Estonian mayor of Tallinn, the result of a coalition between Estonian and Russian politicians attempting to break the power that Baltic Germans had on politics in the Baltic states, and in Tallinn in particular, for centuries. This wave of Estonian and Russian politicians also included future president Konstantin Päts, Jaan Teemant, the first mayor of Tallinn of Russian descent Erast Hiatsintov, and future prime minister Otto Strandman.

From 1903 to 1914, he had a building and engineering office where Anton Uesson (who worked at Lender's office from 1909 to 1912, constructing Jugendstil buildings in Tallinn), began his career as a civil engineer. Notable projects done by Uesson at Lender's company include the limestone historicism-inspired chapel at Rahumäe cemetery. Lender's office continued to function under his administration during his mayoralty.

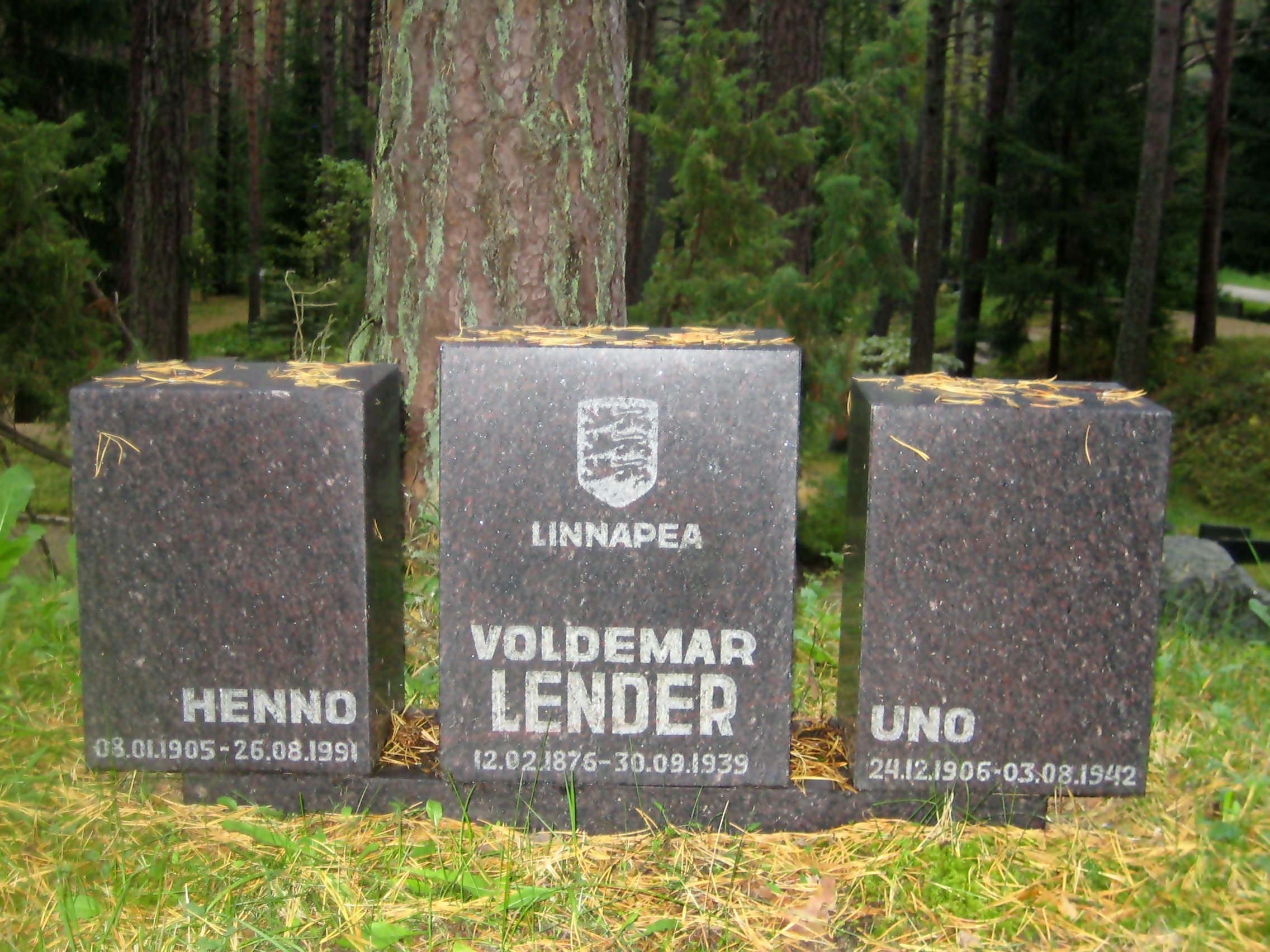
Voldemar Lender and his sons' graves at Metsakalmistu

Lender was on the supervisory board of Harju Bank from 1919 to 1925.

Lender's work primarily consisted of one-and two-story wooden tenement houses with symmetrical facades, called Lender Houses. Despite not being the first designer or the most productive manufacturer of the design that bears his name, he formalised and carried out the supervision of their construction. Lender-style houses were popular from the late 19th century to the early 20th century in the suburbs of Tallinn, known for their cheap construction costs and popularity among Tallinn residents in a time where Tallinn was experiencing large rates of urbanization. In the modern day, the houses built in this style that are still standing are considered environmentally valuable housing estates, along with the areas that they were built in being considered areas of cultural interest.

Lender was also the chairman for the first meeting of the Estonian National Education Society (Estonian: Eesti Rahvahariduse Selts), with the goal of promoting Estonian-language public education at a time when Estonia was under the rule of the Russian Empire.

Lender's wife, Elfriede Lender (née Meikov), was a teacher who founded the first Estonian-speaking girls' school in Estonia. They had four children: daughters Ilka and Juta, teachers, Uno Lender (:et) (1906–1942), a diplomat, and Henno Lender (:et) (1905–1991), a doctor and military captain.

Lender received the second class order of the Order of the Cross of the Eagle on 14 January 1935.

Ending in August 2017, a competition to design a monument memorialising Voldemar and Elfriede Lender was held. The monument was built near the Elfriede Lenderi Eragümnaasium, which Elfriede founded, in the Torupilli district of Tallinn to commemorate the 100th anniversary of the founding of the Republic of Estonia in 2018.

Political offices
Preceded by Eugen Edmund Eduard Erbe	Mayor of Tallinn; 1906–1913	Jaan Poska
