= Estonian Encyclopedia =

Estonian encyclopedia published 1985–2007

Estonian Encyclopaedia (Estonian: Eesti entsüklopeedia) is an Estonian encyclopaedia which was published from 1985 to 2007. From 1985 to 1990, its title was Eesti nõukogude entsüklopeedia (abbreviated ENE; 'Estonian Soviet Encyclopaedia') and thereafter its title was Eesti entsüklopeedia (abbreviated EE).

In 2010, the digitisation of the encyclopaedia began.

The editors-in-chief were as follows:

- Gustav Naan (1985–1989, volumes 1–4)
- Ülo Kaevats (1989–1992)
- Toomas Varrak (1992–1995)
- Ülo Kaevats (1995–2002)
- Hardo Aasmäe (2002–2007)

== See also ==
- Estonian Soviet Encyclopedia
- Estonian Encyclopaedia Publishers
