= Undusk =

Undusk is a surname. Notable people with the surname include:

- Feliks Undusk (born 1948), Estonian politician
- Jaan Undusk (born 1958), Estonian writer
- Johannes Undusk (1918–1979), Estonian politician
