= Valgus (publisher) =

Publishing house in Estonia

Valgus is an Estonian publisher. Valgus publishes, for example, dictionaries, study books, manuals, popular science books. Valgus' headquarters are located in Tallinn.

Valgus was established in 1965. In 1991, major re-organizing was taken place and it gave rise to two publishers: Koolibri and Estonian Encyclopaedia Publishers. Valgus continued its existing.

In the time of Soviet Estonia, Valgus published the Estonian Soviet Encyclopedia.
