= Anton Uesson =

Estonian politician and engineer (1879–1942)

- Born: 12 January 1879; Haimre Parish (now Märjamaa Parish), Kreis Wiek, Governorate of Estonia, Russian Empire
- Died: 13 April 1942 (aged 63); Sverdlovsk Oblast, Russia, Soviet Union
- Occupations: Engineer, architect, politician
- Years active: 1912–1940
- Spouse: Julie Halliku

Anton Uesson (12 January 1879 – 13 April 1942) was an Estonian politician and engineer.

== Early life and career ==
Born in Haimre Parish, Kreis Wiek, Governorate of Estonia (now Rapla County, Estonia), he was the son of Jaan Uesson and Ann Uesson (née Mänd). He was one of eight siblings. Uesson graduated from the Theological Seminary in Riga, present-day Latvia in 1902. In 1910, he finished his studies at the Riga Polytechnic Institute, graduating cum laude with a degree as a civil engineer. He began his career as an architect and engineer by constructing many of Tallinn's jugendstil buildings in the 1910s, working for Tallinn's then-mayor Voldemar Lender. By the spring of 1912, Uesson was constructing over 40 houses in the capital city.

== Politics ==
In 1917 Uesson was a founding member and member of the board of trustees of the Estonian Technical Society. In 1919, Anton Uesson was elected the Deputy Mayor of Tallinn; a post which he held until 1934, when he became deputy mayor, which post was renamed mayor since 1 May 1938.

In 1928, when the Tallinn city government learned that Herbert Hoover had been elected the United States president, Anton Uesson sent Hoover a congratulatory telegram. Hoover had previously, in 1920, been elected an Honorary Citizen of Tallinn. On 4 December Vaba Maa reported on President-elect Hoover's gracious response to Uesson from California.

== Death ==
On 14 June 1941, during the Soviet invasion of Estonia in World War II, Uesson was arrested by the NKVD, along with many other prominent Estonian politicians and intellectuals. He was sent to a gulag in Yekaterinburg, Sverdlovsk oblast and executed by gunshot on 13 April 1942.

== Achievements ==
- 1917, Estonian Engineering Society, a founder and first chairman.
- 1918–1919, Founding member of the Tallinn Technical School and a member of the board of trustees.
- 1920–1922, I EV Riigikogu.
- 1920–1940, The Paramilitaries Endowment Committee Chairman.
- 1920–1940, Chair of the Board of the Association of Estonian Cities.
- 1935–1940, Engineering's Chairman Committee.
- 1937, Member of the Estonian National Assembly (Rahvuskogu).
- 1938–1940, National Council (Riiginõukogu) member.

== Awards ==
- 1928 Order of the Estonian Red Cross, Class I Grade II
- 1930, Order of the Cross of the Eagle, Class III
- 1934 Memorial in the Estonian Red Cross, Class II Grade I
- 1938 Order of the White Star, Class II

== Quotes ==
The stronger the control of local governments, the better the local government representatives and leaders have managed these governments.

– Anton Uesson, 1938

Political offices
Preceded by Aleksander Hellat	Deputy Mayor of Tallinn; 1919	Succeeded by Gottlieb Ast
Preceded by Gottlieb Ast	Mayor of Tallinn; 1919–1934	Succeeded by Jaan Soots
