= Evi Rauer =

Estonian actress

- Born: 29 October 1915; Tallinn, Governorate of Estonia, Russian Empire
- Died: 17 September 2004 (aged 88); Tallinn, Estonia
- Other name: Evi Sikkel
- Occupation: Actress
- Years active: 1938–2000
- Spouse: Arnold Sikkel
- Children: Piret Sikkel

Evi Rauer (29 October 1915 – 17 September 2004) was an Estonian stage, film and television actress and television director whose career spanned more than sixty years.

== Early life ==
Evi Rauer was born in Tallinn to Kustav Rauer, who was an Estonian champion wrestler, and Johanna Katariina Rauer (née Wisel). She spent most summers with family in Haimre, Märjamaa Parish, Rapla County. At age four, her mother was diagnosed with a severe lung ailment and died a year later. Her father would later remarry and emigrate to Sweden following the Soviet occupation of Estonia in 1940. She attended schools in Tallinn, graduating from the Elfriede Lender Girls' Private Gymnasium in 1935. From 1936 until 1939, she studied acting at the Tallinn Töölisteater.

== Stage career ==
Shortly after graduation in 1939, she became engaged as an actress at the Ugala theatre in Viljandi. She would leave the Ugala in 1942, but return for engagements from 1945 until 1952 and again, from 1969 until 1973. From 1942 until 1945, she was engaged at the Endla Theatre in Pärnu, and from 1952 to 1958 at the Tallinn National Drama Theatre (now, the Estonian Drama Theatre). During her years on the stages of Estonian theatres, she would appear in notable productions of works by: Shakespeare, Eugene O'Neill, Hella Wuolijoki, Aleksei Arbuzov, A. H. Tammsaare, August Mälk, Alexander Ostrovsky, August Kitzberg, Oskar Luts and Anton Chekhov, among others.

== Film career ==
In 1951 Rauer made her film debut as Roosi in the Herbert Rappaport directed drama Valgus Koordis for Lenfilm. The film is notable as being the second Estonian feature film made following the annexation of the country by the Soviet Union (the first being 1947's Elu tsitadellis), and starring Estonian singer Georg Ots. The plot of Valgus Koordis follows the struggle of a small village to set up a collective farm after the end of World War II. The film was based on a story of the same name by author Hans Leberecht.

Rauer would follow up her role in Valgus Koordis with a small role in the 1955 Mikhail Yegorov directed drama Jahid merel. In 1960, she had a starring role as Maali in the Aleksandr Mandrõkin directed drama Perekond Männard. In 1967, she appeared in the Lilli Promet penned, Veljo Käsper directed drama Tütarlaps mustas for Tallinnfilm. The following year, she had a small role in the Leida Laius directed film adaptation of the August Kitzburg play Libahunt; in the early 1950s, Rauer had already performed in both a stage adaptation and radio play as Mari, one of the play's main characters. In the film, the role of Mari was played by actress Malle Klaassen.

Following her role in Libahunt, Rauer would return to the stage as an actress. She would not return to film until appearing in a small role in the 1993 Hungarian drama film Senkiföldje, directed by András Jeles. In 1998, she appeared in the family film Kallis härra Q as the character Julius' mother.

== Television ==
From 1958 until 1968 Evi Rauer worked as a broadcast and programming director at Eesti Televisioon (ETV). She retired from acting in 1973.

She had also appeared in a number of roles in feature-length television films, including the 1960 Virve Aruoja directed Näitleja Joller, starring Voldemar Panso, for Eesti Telefilm.

In 1997, at age 83, she was approached by film and television director Tõnis Kask about appearing as a regular cast member on the long-running ETV drama series Õnne 13. Rauer agreed, and debuted on the television series later that year as Maie; a role she would play until 2000.

== Personal life ==
Evi Rauer was married to actor Arnold Sikkel, who died in 1974. The couple had one daughter, actress Piret Sikkel, born in 1941. Evi Rauer died in Tallinn at age 88.

== Acknowledgements ==
- Soviet Estonian Prize (1950)
- Merited Artist of the Estonian SSR (1952)
- USSR State Prize (1952)
