= Ivar Kallion =

Estonian politician

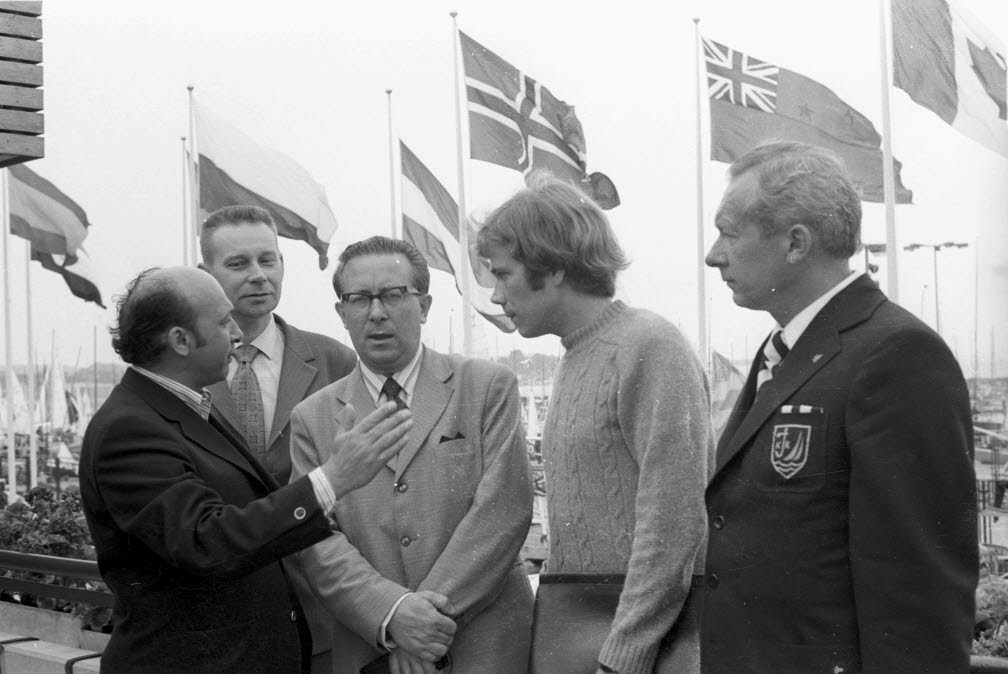

Chairman of the Executive Committee of Tallinn
- In office June 1971 – July 1979
- Preceded by: Johannes Undusk
- Succeeded by: Albert Norak

Personal details
- Born: 30 October 1931; Võru, Estonia
- Died: 16 May 2013 (aged 81); Tallinn, Estonia
- Political party: Communist Party of Estonia
- Children: 2

Ivar Kallion (30 October 1931 – 16 May 2013) was an Estonian Communist politician and author who was the chairman of the Executive Committee of Tallinn from June 1971 to July 1979.

== Biography ==
Kallion graduated from Võru Secondary School in 1950 and, in 1955, graduated from Tallinn Polytechnic Institute with a degree in electrical engineering. He worked as an engineer at the Kiviõli Oil Shale and at the Chemical Combine in the Estonian SSR Ministry of Local, Oil Shale and Chemical Industry in 1955. He had a number of positions within the government of the Communist Party of Estonia; From 1955 to 1959, he was the secretary of the Kiviõli Distribution Committee of the Estonian Leninist Communist Youth Association, the director of the Tartu Battery Plant from 1959 to 1963, as the deputy chairman of the Central Committee of the Central Committee of the Estonian SSR and the Supreme Council of the Estonian SSR from 1963 to 1965.

He later was the Estonian People's Commissariat of Control Deputy Chairperson from 1965 to 1969, and the Head of the Industry and Transportation Department of the Central Committee of the Communist Party Central Committee from 1969 to 1971. From 1971 to 1979, he worked as the chairman of the Executive Committee of the Council of Workers Affairs of the Tallinn Workers Union. From 1979 to 1982, he was director of the ETKVL Commercial Inventory Factory, the Head of ETKVL Industrial Association from 1982 to 1988, the Head of the Industrial Guild of ETKVL from 1988 to 1990, and from 1990 to 1991, an Estonian Engineer Adviser.

Kallion was the chairman of the Executive Committee of Tallinn from June 1971 to July 1979. He oversaw the bidding of Tallinn to host the sailing events of the 1980 Summer Olympics at the Olympic Regatta on the Pirita River, which was ultimately successful.

Known for his sense of humour, Kallion released a series of joke books throughout the years.

Kallion died on 16 May 2013 and was buried on 30 May 2013 at Metsakalmistu.

== Personal life ==
Kallion had been married twice. He has two daughters from the first marriage. One of his daughters, Karin Hallas-Murula, is an architectural historian. His hobbies included collecting humour, music, and fishing.

== Awards ==
- 1995: Tallinn Order
- 2006: 5th class of the Order of the White Star (received 22 February 2006)

== See also ==
- List of mayors of Tallinn
