= Albert Norak =

Estonian politician and swimmer

Chairman of the Executive Committee of Tallinn
- In office July 1979 – December 1984
- Preceded by: Ivar Kallion
- Succeeded by: Harri Lumi

Personal details
- Born: 8 November 1928 Tallinn, Estonia
- Died: 28 March 2015 (aged 86) Tallinn, Estonia
- Party: Communist Party of Estonia

Albert Norak (8 November 1928 – 28 March 2015) was an Estonian swimmer, financier, and civil servant in the Estonian SSR. He later became a Communist politician who was the chairman of the Executive Committee of Tallinn from July 1979 to December 1984. Coincidentally he died on the same day, March 28th, as a prior mayor of Tallinn(1961-1971), Johannes Undusk (1918-1979), but 36 years later.

== Biography ==
Norak graduated from Tallinn Secondary School No. 22 in 1943, and from the Faculty of Economics of the Tallinn University of Technology in 1952 as cum laude.

He began swimming athletically in the backstroke in 1945. He was the Estonian master fifteen times and was in 1950 the Soviet Union Student Champion in the 200m. In his name, he made 15 Estonian records (8 of them in a press release).

He worked as an economist from 1952 to 1959 at the Estonian SSR Ministry of Finance, and was a deputy minister from 1961 to 1966. From 1967 to 1979, he was the Minister of Finance of the Estonian SSR. From 1985 to 1991, he was the head of the Department of Nature Protection and the Department of Economics of the Council of Ministers of the Estonian SSR.

He was a member of the Supreme Soviet of the Estonian SSR. From 1979 to 1984, he was chairman of the Executive Committee of Tallinn. He was succeeded by Harri Lumi.

In 1956, he joined the Communist Party of Estonia. From 1964 to 1971, he was a member of the party's Revision Committee, and from 1971 to 1986, the party's Central Committee. In 1963, he graduated from the Higher Party School of the CPSU.

He belonged to the Board of Swimming from 1959 to 1963, the Presidium of the Swimming Federation, and in 1952, was a part of the Estonian Sports Association. He was also a member of both the board and the audit committee of the Estonian Nature Conservation Society. From 1991 onward, he was the chairman of the Estonian Grandfather's Assistance Society, which provides assistance to large families. From 1965 to 1996, he was the chairman of the Estonian-Polish Association.

== Personal life ==
Norak was married twice. His first marriage was with Ella, with whom he had three daughters and a son. Their son, Andrus Norak, was a clergyman. He died on 28 March 2015 from complications of Parkinson's disease, and was buried at Metsakalmistu.

== Awards ==
- 1996: Cross of Merit of Poland

== See also ==
- List of mayors of Tallinn
