= Greiffenhagen =

Greiffenhagen is a surname. Notable people with the surname include:

- Maurice Greiffenhagen (1862–1931), British painter
- Wilhelm Greiffenhagen (1821–1890), Baltic German journalist and politician

== See also ==
- Greifenhagen, village in Saxony-Anhalt, Germany
- Greifenhagen, German name for Gryfino, town in West Pomerania province, Poland
