= List of members of the Supreme Soviet of the Estonian Soviet Socialist Republic, 1951–1955 =

This is a list of members of the third legislature of the Supreme Soviet of the Estonian Soviet Socialist Republic which was the Estonian Soviet Socialist Republic's legislative chamber between 1940 and 1941, and between 1944 and 1992. The session ran from 25 February 1951 to 27 February 1955, and followed the 1951 Estonian Supreme Soviet election in which only Bloc of Communists and Non-Party Candidates was the only party able to contest the elections.

== List of members ==
Source: Jaan Toomla, Valitud ja Valitsenud: Eesti parlamentaarsete ja muude esinduskogude ning valitsuste isikkoosseis aastail 1917–1999 (National Library of Estonia, 1999), pp. 89–91.

Name	Party	Notes
Arma Aarma		
Georg Abels	NLKP	
Heinrich Ajo	NLKP	Died 07.06.1953
Karl Allikas	NLKP	
Aleksander Ansberg	NLKP	
Jaan Apfelbaum	NLKP	
Adolf Armas		
Eduard Aus		
Ivan Beljajev	NLKP	
Grigori Bõstrikov	NLKP	
Johan Eichfeld		
Arnold Green	NLKP	
Fedor Gukov	NLKP	
Ida Gutves		
Nikolai Harlamov	NLKP	
Hilda Hein	NLKP	
Aleksander Hendrikson	NLKP	
Leonhard-Friedrich Illisson	NLKP	
Aleksander Jaanus	NLKP	
August Jakobson	NLKP	
Eha Kaarus		
Gustav Kallas		
Melania Kalm		
Eugen Kapp	NLKP	
Meta Kodanipork		
Alviine Konno	NLKP	
Vassili Kossov	NLKP	
Aleksander Kozlov	NLKP	
Aleksei Kotov	NLKP	
Juta Kütsar		
August Krull	NLKP	
August Kründel	NLKP	
Richard Kurvits	NLKP	
Dimitri Kuzmin	NLKP	
Villem Kuusik	NLKP	Resigned 1952
August Kuusk		
Marta Kuusberg		
Ivan Käbin	NLKP	
Elmar Künnap	NLKP	
Hermann Laanejärv	NLKP	
Linda Laanemäe	NLKP	
Salme Lainsalu		
Hugo Laur	NLKP	
Hans Leberecht	NLKP	
Reet Leetsaar	NLKP	
Leonid Lentsman	NLKP	
Vladimir Lipp	NLKP	
Vilhelm Lombak	NLKP	
Olga Lund (Gerretz)	NLKP	
Ivan Luts	NLKP	
Georgi Malenkov	NLKP	
Nikolai Medvedjev	NLKP	
Otto Merimaa	NLKP	
Endel Mets		
Aleksander Mette	NLKP	Elected 04.10.1953
Vjatšeslav Molotov	NLKP	
Valentin Moskalenko	NLKP	
Julius Murd	NLKP	
Alfred Mõttus	NLKP	Died 08.12.1951
Linda Mälk	NLKP	
Johanna Mühlmann		
Aleksei Müürisepp	NLKP	
Gustav Naan	NLKP	
Georg Nellis	NLKP	
Richard Niinepuu	NLKP	Elected 22.02.1953
Rudolf Nimmer		
Amalie Nõgene		
Anna Nõmm		
Ivan Oja	NLKP	
Voldemar Oja	NLKP	
Mahta Otsing		
Elmiine Õisman	NLKP	
Kaarel Paas (Pauk)	NLKP	
Helene Palts	NLKP	
Aleksandr Pankratov	NLKP	
Boris Petrov	NLKP	
Karl Pihlakas		
Otto Piksar		
Pjotr Pomazkin	NLKP	
Panteleimon Ponomarenko	NLKP	
Aleksander Promet	NLKP	
Endel Puusepp	NLKP	
Ida Reimer	NLKP	
Martha Reino (Lindworst)		
Ernst Ristmägi	NLKP	
Lidia Roots	NLKP	
Ivan Rosental	NLKP	
Joosep Saat	NLKP	
Olga Samoilik	NLKP	
Georgi Saveljev	NLKP	
Liidia Seppo		
Kapitolina Seppois		
Marta Serel	NLKP	
Endel Sinimägi		
Aleksander Sokolov	NLKP	
August Soo	NLKP	
Arthur Soolau	NLKP	Elected 23.03.1952
Jossif Stalin	NLKP	Died 05.03.1953
Jefim Stepanov	NLKP	
Liina Stepanova	NLKP	
Maria Šelobnjeva		
Erna Šutova (Sammet)	ÜLKNÜ	
Alma Taimsoo		
Voldemar Telling	NLKP	
Juliana Teiman	NLKP	
Anatoli Tihane	NLKP	
Ivan Tompel	NLKP	
Arnold Treiberg	NLKP	
Stepan Tšernikov	NLKP	
Olga Tuglas		
Alviine Tõrva		
Leonid Vagin	NLKP	
Arnold Veimer	NLKP	
Aleksander Verner		
Rudolf Vester	NLKP	
Leonida Virunurm	NLKP	
Erna Visk	NLKP	
Sulev Visnapuu	NLKP	
