= Alexander Rudolf Karl von Uexküll =

Baltic German politician (1829–1891)

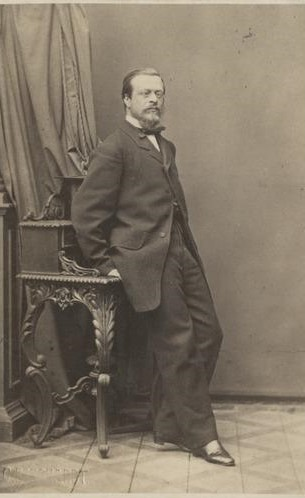
- Alexander von Uexküll, photographed by Charles Borchardt

Mayor of Reval
- In office April 1878 – June 1883
- Preceded by: Oscar Arthur von Riesemann
- Succeeded by: Wilhelm Greiffenhagen

Personal details
- Born: 6 June [O.S. 25 May] 1829 Seltso, Saint Petersburg, Russian Empire
- Died: 9 December [O.S. 28 November] 1891 (aged 62) Reval, Governorate of Estonia, Russian Empire (present-day Tallinn, Estonia)
- Education: Imperial University of Dorpat

Alexander Rudolf Karl Freiherr von Uexküll (6 June [O.S. 25 May] 1829 – 9 December [O.S. 28 November] 1891) was a Baltic German noble and statesman at the Russian Imperial service, best known as the mayor of Reval (now Tallinn) from April 1878 to June 1883. He was a member of the noble von Uexküll family, which had origins in Bremen. Von Uexküll studied in the Imperial University of Dorpat. He owned Heimar manor (now Haimre). His son was biologist and pioneer of biosemiotics Jakob von Uexküll. He was succeeded by Wilhelm Greiffenhagen.

== See also ==
- List of mayors of Tallinn
