= Estonian Encyclopaedia Publishers =

Estonian publishing house

Estonian Encyclopaedia Publishers (Estonian: Eesti Entsüklopeediakirjastus) was an Estonian publisher which published reference literature (like encyclopedias, atlases) and popular science literature.

As of 2009, publisher's main shareholders were Hardo Aasmäe (owned 25.6%), Jüri Ott (owned 20.4%), and Ülo Kaevats (owned 12.0%).

In 2011, the publisher went bankrupt. However, the bankruptcy proceedings got stuck because the owner of the publishing house's last office, Ülemiste City, confiscated the property in the company's office and sold it to cover the 9,000-euro rent debt. Bankruptcy administrator Tiina Mitt estimated its value at over 4.3 million euros. The location of sold documents, author contracts and books under editing is unknown. A part of the EE archive was also lost, a criminal investigation was initiated.

== Notable publications ==
- 1999 "100 great Estonians of the 20th century"
- 2004 "A ja O"
