= Aleksander Kiidelmaa =

Estonian politician, communist

Chairman of the Executive Committee of Tallinn
- In office September 1944 – 26 February 1945
- Preceded by: Artur Terras
- Succeeded by: Ado Kurvits

Mayor of Tallinn
- In office July 1940 – January 1941
- Preceded by: Aleksander Tõnisson
- Succeeded by: Kristjan Seaver

Personal details
- Born: 26 September 1896 Narva, Saint Petersburg Governorate, Russian Empire
- Died: 16 August 1969 (aged 72) Tallinn, then part of Estonian SSR, Soviet Union
- Party: Communist Party of Estonia
- Spouse: Maali Moosel

Aleksander Kiidelmaa (26 September 1896 – 16 August 1969) was an Estonian trade unionist and Communist politician who was the mayor of Tallinn from July 1940 to January 1941, and again (as the chairman of the Executive Committee of Tallinn) from September 1944 to 26 February 1945.

He was also a member of the Supreme Soviet of the Estonian SSR from 1940 to 1947. He was the mayor of Tallinn under the occupation of the Soviet Union during their occupation of the Baltic States from 1940 to 1941. He was later the chairman of the Executive Committee of Tallinn from September 1944 to February 1945, in the immediate aftermath of the Soviet Union reconquering Estonia from the Nazi German forces.

He died on 16 August 1969 in Tallinn, and was buried on 29 August at Metsakalmistu.

== See also ==
- List of mayors of Tallinn
