= List of mayors of Tallinn =

The following is a list of mayors of Tallinn (before 1918 Reval), Estonia.

| * | Office | Name | Political affiliation | Notes |
|---|---|---|---|---|
| 1 | April 1786 – November 1796 | Wilhelm Hetling | | Mayor, first mayor of Tallinn |
| | November 1796 – December 1877 | | | Magistracy of Reval was restored for 81 years |
| 2 | 22 December 1877 – 6 April 1878 | Oscar Arthur von Riesemann | | Mayor |
| 3 | April 1878 – June 1883 | Alexander Rudolf Karl von Uexküll | | Mayor, baron |
| 4 | June 1883 – August 1885 | Wilhelm Greiffenhagen | | Mayor |
| | August – December 1885 | Viktor von Maydell | | Deputy Mayor, baron |
| 5 | December 1885 – July 1894 | Viktor von Maydell | | Mayor |
| 6 | July 1894 – April 1895 | Eduard Ernst Bätke | | Deputy Mayor |
| 7 | April 1895 – February 1905 | Karl Johann von Hueck | | Mayor |
| 8 | February – December 1905 | Erast Hiatsintov | | Mayor |
| 9 | December 1905 – May 1906 | Eugen Edmund Eduard Erbe | | Deputy Mayor |
| 10 | May 1906 – August 1913 | Voldemar Lender | | Mayor, first Estonian mayor |
| 11 | August 1913 – April 1917 | Jaan Poska | | Mayor |
| 12 | April – September 1917 | Gavriil Beljagin | | Deputy Mayor |
| 13 | September 1917 – March 1918 | Voldemar Vöölmann | | Chairman of City Government |
| 14 | March – 13 November 1918 | Erhard Arnold Julius Dehio | | Lord Mayor (Oberbürgermeister) |
| 15 | March – 13 November 1918 | Alexander Riesenkampff | | Second Mayor |
| 16 | 13–25 November 1918 | Aleksander Pallas | | temporary Deputy Mayor |
| 17 | 25 November 1918 – May 1919 | Aleksander Hellat | | Mayor |
| 18 | May – June 1919 | Anton Uesson | | Deputy Mayor |
| 19 | June – July 1919 | Gottlieb Ast | | Mayor |
| 20 | July 1919 – April 1934 | Anton Uesson | | Mayor |
| 21 | April 1934 – December 1939 | Jaan Soots | | Mayor, from 1 May 1938 Lord Mayor |
| 22 | December 1939 – July 1940 | Aleksander Tõnisson | | Lord Mayor |
| 23 | July 1940 – January 1941 | Aleksander Kiidelmaa | | Mayor |
| 24 | 17 January – 24 August 1941 | Kristjan Seaver | Communist Party | Chairman of Executive Committee |
| 25 | 24–29 August 1941 | Artur Terras | | Mayor |
| | 29 August – 6 December 1941 | Artur Terras | | Lord Mayor |
| | 6 December 1941 – September 1944 | Artur Terras | | First Mayor (Erster Bürgermeister) |
Chairman of Executive Committee
| 26 | September 1944 – 26 February 1945 | Aleksander Kiidelmaa | Communist Party | |
| 27 | 26 February – 17 September 1945 | Ado Kurvits | Communist Party | |
| 28 | 17 September 1945 – 27 March 1961 | Aleksander Hendrikson | Communist Party | |
| 29 | 27 March 1961 – June 1971 | Johannes Undusk | Communist Party | |
| 30 | June 1971 – July 1979 | Ivar Kallion | Communist Party | |
| 31 | July 1979 – December 1984 | Albert Norak | Communist Party | |
| 32 | December 1984 – 16 January 1990 | Harri Lumi | Communist Party | |
| 33 | 16 January 1990 – 19 August 1991 | Hardo Aasmäe | Communist Party | |
Mayor
| 33 | 20 August 1991 – 11 March 1992 | Hardo Aasmäe | Popular Front | |
| 34 | 15 April 1992 – 30 October 1996 | Jaak Tamm | Coalition Party | |
| 35 | 31 October 1996 – 14 November 1996 | Priit Vilba | Reform Party | |
| 36 | 14 November 1996 – 30 April 1997 | Robert Lepikson | Coalition Party | |
| 37 | 15 May 1997 – 25 March 1999 | Ivi Eenmaa | Coalition Party | |
| 38 | 25 March 1999 – 5 November 1999 | Peeter Lepp | Centre Party | |
| 39 | 6 November 1999 – 31 May 2001 | Jüri Mõis | Pro Patria | |
| 40 | 5 June 2001 – 13 December 2001 | Tõnis Palts | Pro Patria | |
| 41 | 13 December 2001 – 14 October 2004 | Edgar Savisaar | Centre Party | |
| 42 | 14 October 2004 – 15 November 2005 | Tõnis Palts | Res Publica | |
| 43 | 15 November 2005 – 5 April 2007 | Jüri Ratas | Centre Party | |
| 44 | 9 April 2007 – 9 November 2017 | Edgar Savisaar | Centre Party | suspended by court order since 30 September 2015 |
| 45 | 9 November 2017 – 4 April 2019 | Taavi Aas | Centre Party | |
| 46 | 11 April 2019 – 26 March 2024 | Mihhail Kõlvart | Centre Party | |
| 47 | 14 April 2024 – 8 December 2025 | Jevgeni Ossinovski | Social Democrat | |
| 48 | 8 December 2025 – present | Peeter Raudsepp | Pro Patria | |

== See also ==
- Timeline of Tallinn
