= Voldemar Vöölmann =

Estonian politician (1887–1937)

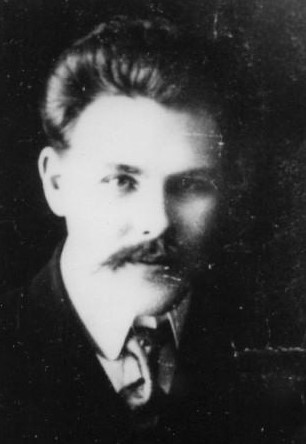

Chairman of the City Government of Tallinn
- In office September 1917 – March 1918
- Preceded by: Gavriil Beljagin (as deputy mayor)
- Succeeded by: Erhard Arnold Julius Dehio (as lord mayor); Alexander Riesenkampff (as second mayor)

Personal details
- Born: 1887
- Died: 14 June 1937 (age 49–50)

Voldemar Vöölmann (1887 – 14 June 1937) was an Estonian Communist politician who was the chairman of the city government of Tallinn from September 1917 to March 1918.

He was elected to the Tallinn City Council as part of the Bolshevik movement, with Jaan Anvelt as a council member. He presided over Tallinn during the establishment of the Republic of Estonia and the dissolution of the Russian Empire. He resigned in March 1918 after the German Empire occupied Tallinn. He was succeeded by Erhard Arnold Julius Dehio as the installed lord mayor. A member of the Bolshevik faction known as the Fontanniks, Vöölmann criticized Anvelt for his shortcomings during the failed uprising in 1924. After the failed uprising, Vöölmann left for the Soviet Union. He was later the deputy head of the government of the Kazakh ASSR and the chairman of the Russian Construction Committee. He was executed on 14 June 1937, during the Great Purge. He was later portrayed by Sulev Luik in the film Kaks päeva Viktor Kingissepa elust (1981).

== See also ==
- List of mayors of Tallinn
