= Kristjan Seaver =

Estonian politician (1898–1941)

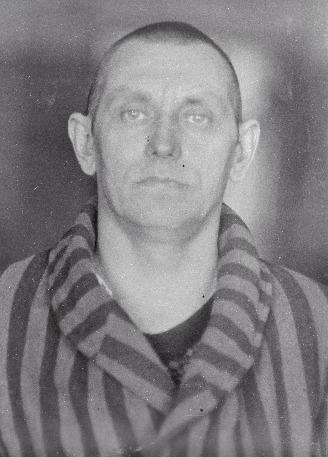
- Kristjan Seaver as a prisoner at Tallinn Central Prison

Chairman of the Executive Committee of Tallinn
- In office 17 January 1941 – 24 August 1941
- Preceded by: Aleksander Kiidelmaa
- Succeeded by: Artur Terras (as mayor)

Personal details
- Born: 1898
- Died: 28 August 1941 (age 42–43); Gulf of Finland
- Political party: Communist Party of Estonia

Kristjan Seaver (1898 – 28 August 1941) was an Estonian Communist politician who was the chairman of the executive committee of Tallinn from 17 January to 24 August 1941. He initially was a member of the Ravila branch of the Bolsheviks. He later was involved in the October Revolution in Estonia, and was a planner of the failed 1924 uprising in Estonia. For his part, he was arrested in September 1925 and was sentenced to life in prison. He was later granted amnesty in 1940 and later participated in the Soviet takeover of Estonia. Seaver later became the chairman of the executive committee of Tallinn from 17 January to 24 August 1941. He disbanded all representational authority. After he resigned on 24 August, on 28 August, he evacuated Tallinn with a number of representatives of other Soviet authorities due to the Nazi German invasion of Tallinn. He was killed when the Baltic Fleet ship he was in, the destroyer Yakov Sverdlov, hit a naval mine in the Gulf of Finland and sank. He was succeeded as mayor (during the Nazi occupation of Estonia) by Artur Terras.

== See also ==
- List of mayors of Tallinn
