= Gottlieb Ast =

Estonian politician (1874–1919)

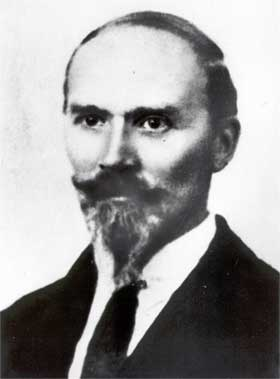

Mayor of Tallinn
- In office June 1919 – July 1919
- Preceded by: Anton Uesson
- Succeeded by: Anton Uesson

Personal details
- Born: 2 March 1874 Orava, Kreis Werro, Governorate of Livonia
- Died: 15 December 1919 (aged 45) Tallinn, Estonia

Gottlieb Jaan Ast (2 March 1874 – 15 December 1919) was an Estonian politician who was the mayor of Tallinn from June to July 1919.

Ast graduated from the Faculty of Law at the University of Tartu in 1906. Afterwards, he became involved in politics and was active in southern Estonia as a socialist agitator. After the failed 1905 Russian Revolution, he emigrated to Switzerland in 1906 and to Dresden, Germany, and later the United States, but returned to Estonia after the February Revolution. After returning to Estonia, he joined the Estonian Social Democratic Workers' Party and was elected as a representative of the party to the Tallinn City Government and was later the mayor of Tallinn, where he served for one month, from June to July 1919. He died of tuberculosis in December 1919 and was buried in Rahumäe cemetery. His younger brother was politician and writer Karl Ast.

== See also ==
- List of mayors of Tallinn
