= Eduard Ernst Bätke =

Baltic-German politician

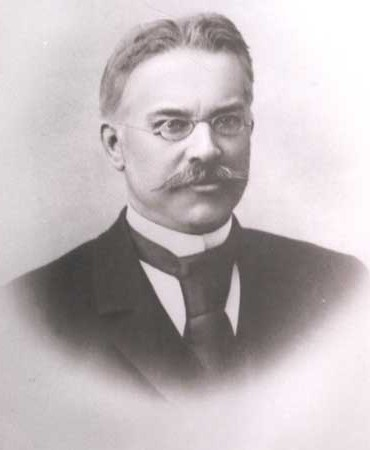

Deputy mayor of Tallinn
- In office July 1894 – April 1895
- Preceded by: Viktor von Maydell
- Succeeded by: Karl Johann von Hueck

Personal details
- Born: 10 July 1849 Reval, Russian Empire (modern-day Tallinn, Estonia)
- Died: 29 December 1920 (aged 71) Tallinn, Estonia

Eduard Ernst Bätke (also spelled Bätge; 10 July 1849 – 29 December 1925) was a Baltic German politician who was the deputy mayor of Reval (now Tallinn) from July 1894 to April 1895. He was a member of Reval's city council from 1882 to 1905, and was also the president of the Municipal Government Gas, Waterworks, and Promenades Commission. He was later a deputy head of the city from 1886 to 1897. He was elected to be the mayor of Reval in 1894, but was not confirmed for office; instead, he served as deputy mayor from July 1894 to April 1895. He was succeeded by Karl Johann von Hueck.

== See also ==
- List of mayors of Tallinn
