= 1951 Estonian Supreme Soviet election =

1951 elections in Estonian SSR

Elections to the Supreme Soviet of the Estonian SSR were held on 25 February 1951. The Bloc of Communists and Non-Party Candidates was the only party that was permitted to contest the elections, and won all 115 seats. Elected members included Joseph Stalin (Tallinn constituency no. 3), Vyacheslav Molotov (Tallinn constituency no. 18), Georgi Malenkov (Tallinn constituency no. 12), and Panteleimon Ponomarenko (Tallinn constituency no. 4).

== Results ==
Party	Votes	%	Seats
Bloc of Communists and Non-Party Candidates	812,569	99.86	115
Against	1,118	0.14	–
Total	813,687	100.00	115
Valid votes	813,687	99.99	
Invalid/blank votes	90	0.01	
Total votes	813,777	100.00	
Registered voters/turnout	814,682	99.89	
Source: Liivik

== See also ==
- List of members of the Supreme Soviet of the Estonian Soviet Socialist Republic, 1951–1955
