= Ado Kurvits =

Estonian politician (1897–1958)

Chairman of the Executive Committee of Tallinn
- In office 26 February 1945 – 17 September 1945
- Preceded by: Aleksander Kiidelmaa
- Succeeded by: Aleksander Hendrikson

Personal details
- Born: 1897
- Died: 1958 (age 60–61)
- Party: Communist Party of Estonia

Ado Kurvits (1897–1958) was an Estonian Communist politician who was the chairman of the executive committee of Tallinn from 26 February to 17 September 1945. He was deported after the Soviet Union invaded Estonia in 1940. Despite this, he was the first chairman after the Soviet Union reconquered Estonia from the Nazi German occupation of Estonia, and was chairman during the official end of World War II. He was succeeded by Aleksander Hendrikson. He died in 1958 and is buried at Helme cemetery in Valga County.

== See also ==
- List of mayors of Tallinn
