= Revalsche Zeitung =

Estonian newspaper

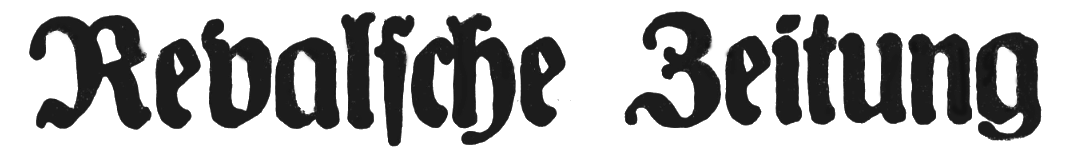
- Founded: 1860
- Ceased publication: 1940
- Language: German
- Headquarters: Tallinn, Estonia

Revalsche Zeitung was a daily German language newspaper published in Tallinn, Estonia. The paper was launched in 1860 by Wilhelm Greiffenhagen and Friedrich Nikolai Russow. The first editor-in-chief was Friedrich Nikolai Russow, who served in the post until 1863. The paper was published until 1914. It was restarted in 1930 and ceased publication in 1940.

The newspaper was published under other names in the 20th century. During various periods it was called Revaler Bote, Revalsches Tageblatt, Revaler Zeitung, Estländische Zeitung, Ostsee-Zeitung.

== Editors ==
- 1860–1867 Wilhelm Greiffenhagen
- 1860–1862 Friedrich Nikolai Russow
- 1865 Julius Wilhelm Lackner
- 1865–1867 Wilhelm Warbandt
- 1867–1869 Leopold von Pezold
- 1869–1870 Friedrich Bienemann (:de)
- 1870–1873 Wilhelm Warbandt
- 1871–1878 Eugen Heubel
- 1878–1914 Christoph Mickwitz (:et)
- 1879–1881 Wilhelm Warbandt
- 1905–1908 Paul Schiemann
- 1908–1914 Theodor Jürgens, Max Koch
- 1914 Adolf von Keussler
- 1930–1933 Axel de Vries
- 1933–1937 Reinhold Hasselblatt
- 1937–1938 Ewert Krusenstjern
- 1938–1939 Axel de Vries
- 1940 Heinrich von Neff, Hans Otto von zur Mühlen
