= Alexander Riesenkampff =

Baltic German lawyer and politician

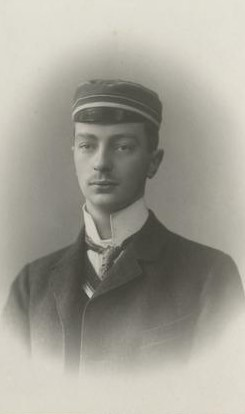

Second mayor of Tallinn
- In office March 1918 – 13 November 1918
- Preceded by: Voldemar Vöölmann (as chair of the city government of Tallinn)
- Succeeded by: Aleksander Pallas (as acting deputy mayor)

Personal details
- Born: 7 August 1888 Reval, Russian Empire (modern-day Tallinn, Estonia)
- Died: 28 December 1940 (aged 52) Berlin, Germany

Karl Alexander Justus Riesenkampff (7 August 1888 – 28 December 1940) was a Baltic German lawyer and politician who was the second mayor of Tallinn from March 1918 to 13 November 1918, with Erhard Arnold Julius Dehio as lord mayor. He graduated in 1910 from the Faculty of Law of the University of Tartu in jurisprudence. He first worked in courts in Yaroslavl and Riga, before eventually becoming a lawyer in Tallinn. He was the second mayor of Tallinn during the German occupation of Estonia during World War I, when the German Empire occupied most of newly independent Estonia, including Tallinn. Riesenkampff resigned as second mayor after the end of the occupation, but was still active in Tallinn, becoming the curator for the Tallinn Cathedral School, as well as a member of the German Cultural Association. He was succeeded as temporary deputy mayor by Aleksander Pallas. Riesenkampff eventually left for Germany, moving to Berlin, where he was previously a journalist. He died in 1940.

== See also ==
- List of mayors of Tallinn
