= Oscar Arthur von Riesemann =

Baltic German lawyer and politician

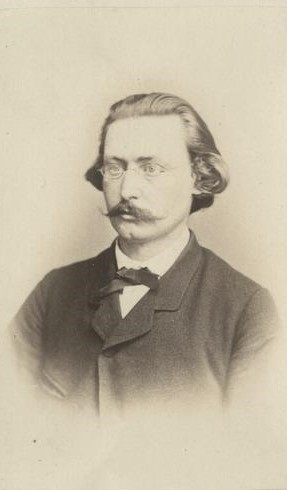

Mayor of Reval
- In office 22 December [O.S. 10] 1877 – 6 April [O.S. 25 March] 1878
- Preceded by: Wilhelm Hetling (1796; before Magistracy of Reval was revoked)
- Succeeded by: Alexander Rudolf Karl von Uexküll

Personal details
- Born: 15 August [O.S. 3] 1833 Reval, Governorate of Estonia, Russian Empire (present-day Tallinn, Estonia)
- Died: 15 July [O.S. 3] 1880 Reval, Governorate of Estonia, Russian Empire (present-day Tallinn, Estonia)
- Education: Imperial University of Dorpat

Oscar Arthur von Riesemann (15 August [O.S. 3] 1833 – 15 July [O.S. 3] 1880) was a Baltic German lawyer and politician who was the mayor of Reval from 22 December 1877 to 6 April 1878.

A member of a prominent Baltic German family that had origins in Lübeck, von Riesemann studied the arts abroad. He formulated the Governorate of Estonia's provincial property tax. He was the first mayor of Reval in nearly a century, after the end of the mayoralty of Wilhelm Hetling. This was due to the revocation of the Magistracy of Reval, the governing institution of the city at the time. In 1864, he was appointed the head legal counsel of the Reval Magistrate. He was later elected by the Reval Landtag at the Reval Town Hall in 1877, due to his sympathy for the concerns of the majority Estonian population. He emerged as a central figure in the opposition to the main Baltic German party in the elections to the first independent Reval city council. He was succeeded by Baron Alexander Rudolf Karl von Uexküll.

== See also ==
List of mayors of Tallinn
