= Rannajõe =

Village in Estonia

Coordinates: 58°49′N 23°48′E

- Village
- Interactive map of Rannajõe
- Country: Estonia
- County: Lääne County
- Parish: Lääne-Nigula Parish
- Time zone: UTC+2 (EET)
  - Summer (DST): UTC+3 (EEST)

Rannajõe (previously, Rannamõisa) is a village in Lääne-Nigula Parish, Lääne County, in western Estonia.

== Notable people ==
Notable people that were born or lived in Rannajõe include the following:

- Hardo Aasmäe (1951–2014), geographer, entrepreneur, and politician
