= Harri Lumi =

Estonian politician (1933–2025)

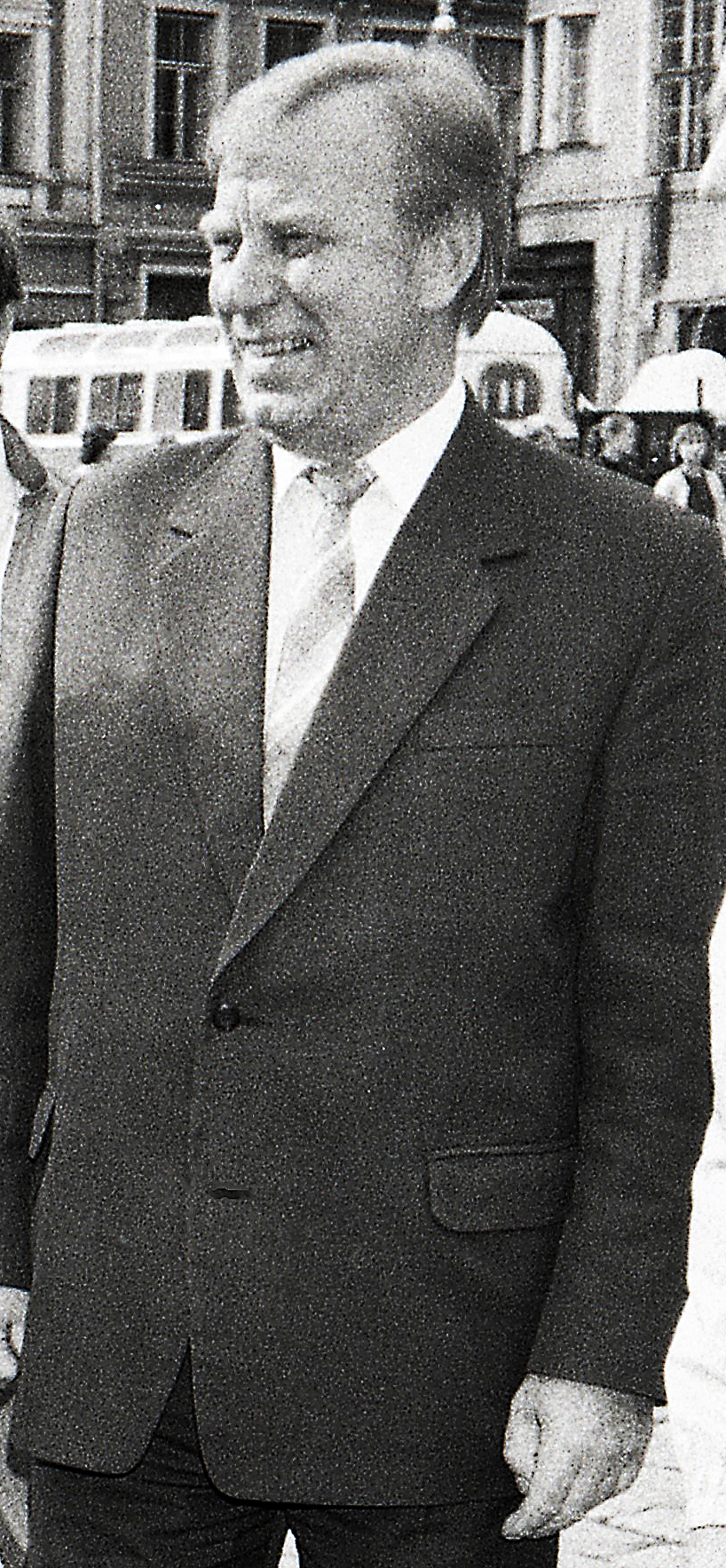
- Lumi in 1988

Chairman of the Executive Committee of Tallinn
- In office December 1984 – 16 January 1990
- Preceded by: Albert Norak
- Succeeded by: Hardo Aasmäe (as mayor)

Personal details
- Born: 7 February 1933 Tallinn, Estonia
- Died: 20 May 2025 (aged 92)
- Party: Communist Party of Estonia

Harri Lumi (7 February 1933 – 20 May 2025) was an Estonian Communist politician who was the last full term chairman of the Executive Committee of Tallinn from December 1984 to 16 January 1990.

== Life and career ==
Lumi graduated from Tallinn's 17th Secondary School in 1952 and, in 1957, graduated from the Faculty of Civil Engineering of the Tallinn University of Technology with a degree in engineering. He worked as an engineer in the Government of the Residential Government Reserve in Tallinn from 1955 to 1960, in the 1960s in the subordinate units of the Estonian SSR Ministry of Construction, and from 1965 to 1977, he worked as the Chief Engineer and then Head of the Construction Management Construction Board of Tallinn. From 1977 to 1979, he was chairman of the Republican Building Management Trust of Lumi.

In 1979, Lumi was appointed the first deputy chairman of the RSN Executive Committee in Tallinn, where he worked until 1983. From 1983 to 1984, he was the Minister of Construction of the Estonian SSR. After the regaining of independence of Estonia, he was the Construction Director of the joint venture Estkompexim from 1990 to 1992, and from 1992 to 1995 he was the Deputy Head of the Industrial Construction Trust, a state-owned joint-stock company. In 1994, he was one of the founders of the joint stock company Parmeron and still held some ownership.

Lumi was chairman of the Executive Committee of Tallinn from December 1984 to 16 January 1990. He was the last chairman of the Executive Committee. He was chairman during the Estonian Sovereignty Declaration, the subsequent Singing Revolution and the start of the dissolution of the Estonian SSR.

Lumi led the efforts to have Tallinn's Old Town become a UNESCO World Heritage Site, as well as opening up Tallinn to foreign countries. He led the plans to start the dissolution of the Soviet government in Tallinn, eventually renaming the government from the Executive Committee to Tallinn City Government. He was succeeded by Hardo Aasmäe as mayor of Tallinn.

Lumi died on 20 May 2025, at the age of 92.

== See also ==
- List of mayors of Tallinn
