= Wilhelm Hetling =

Baltic German politician (1740–1798)

Mayor of Tallinn
- In office April 1786 – November 1796
- Preceded by: Position established
- Succeeded by: Oscar Arthur von Riesemann (1877; after Magistracy of Reval was revoked)

Personal details
- Born: 8 January 1740 Reval, Russian Empire (modern-day Tallinn, Estonia)
- Died: 8 January 1798 (aged 58) Reval, Russian Empire

Wilhelm Hetling (8 January 1740, Reval, Russian Empire (modern-day Tallinn, Estonia) – 8 January 1798, Reval) was a Baltic German politician who was the first mayor of Tallinn, then known as Reval. His family was a prominent Baltic German family in Reval and the surrounding area for centuries. His father, Carl Nicolaus Hetling, was the head of the Tallinn Magistrate from 1767 to 1781. Wilhelm Hetling became mayor after the initial revocation of the Magistracy of Reval, the political institution that had political control over the city. In his time, he earned 800 rubles a year while mayor. After his mayoralty, the Magistracy of Reval was reinstated, and the next mayor, Oscar Arthur von Riesemann, would be elected in 1877, 90 years after the mayoralty of Hetling.

== See also ==
- List of mayors of Tallinn
