= Karl Johann von Hueck =

Baltic German politician

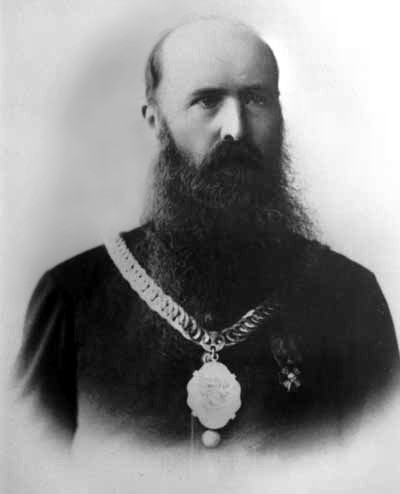

Mayor of Tallinn
- In office April 1895 – February 1905
- Preceded by: Eduard Ernst Bätke
- Succeeded by: Erast Hiatsintov

Personal details
- Born: 6 July 1844 Dorpat, Governorate of Livonia, Russian Empire (modern-day Tartu, Estonia)
- Died: 8 October 1925 (aged 81) Tallinn, Estonia

Karl Johann von Hueck (also spelled Johan; 6 July 1844 – 8 October 1925) was a Baltic German politician who was the mayor of Reval (now Tallinn) from April 1895 to February 1905. He graduated from the University of Tartu's Faculty of Economics in 1865, and went abroad thereafter. He was a farmer throughout what is now Estonia. He managed Laitse and Kukruse manors after his return, and later owned Munalaskme manor. From 1891 to 1894, he was the secretary of the Estonian Agricultural Society, and was the chairman and honorary member of the Estonian Horticultural Society. von Hueck later became the mayor of Reval from April 1895 to February 1905. He was later a city councilor in Reval from 1905 to 1912. He was succeeded by Erast Hiatsintov.

== See also ==
- List of mayors of Tallinn
