= Erast Hiatsintov =

Russian politician (1858–1910)

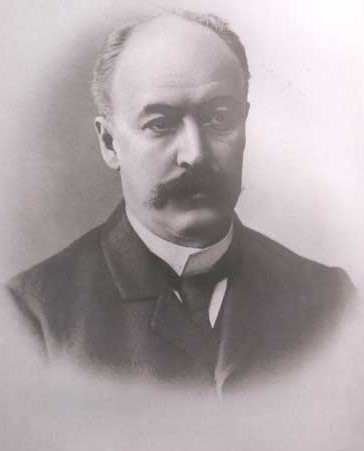

Mayor of Tallinn
- In office February 1905 – December 1905
- Preceded by: Karl Johann von Hueck
- Succeeded by: Eugen Edmund Eduard Erbe

Personal details
- Born: 10 November 1858 Moscow, Russian Empire
- Died: 7 April 1910 (aged 51) Reval, Russian Empire
- Education: Moscow State University

Erast Georgievich Hiatsintov (Russian: Эра́ст Гео́ргиевич Гиаци́нтов; 10 November 1858 – 7 April 1910) was a Russian politician who was the mayor of Reval (now Tallinn) in from February 1905 to December of that year, notably becoming the first person of Russian descent to become the mayor of Reval. Consequently, he was also the first person of non-Baltic German descent to become mayor, the culmination of an Estonian-Russian political alliance, created by future Estonian president Konstantin Päts and Jaan Poska that broke the power that Baltic Germans had in the political system of the city for centuries.

== Biography ==
Born in Moscow to a noble family from Ryazan, Hiatsintov graduated with a degree in law from Moscow State University. After he graduated, he worked in Moscow courts. He then worked in Łomża, where in 1885, he was appointed as the Chief Complaint Officer and took up the position of Chancellor of the Office of Łomża. In 1889, he moved to Estonia, where he became the commissioner of a peasant farm in Rakvere. In 1893, he was transferred to the position of adviser to the Governorate of Estonia, in the capital of Reval. A permanent member of the Provincial Commission for the Peoples Affairs in the provincial governorate, he was a prominent figure in combating human trafficking in Reval. He later became the mayor of Reval in 1905, serving from February 1905 to December 1905. His mayoralty was considered to be rather hands-off, allowing for the Reval city council to enact legislature. He resigned for health reasons and the fallout from the failed 1905 Russian Revolution, of which Hiatsintov, who presided over Reval while it occurred, condemned the violence that had occurred in Reval as a result. He was succeeded by Eugen Edmund Eduard Erbe.

Hiatsintov died on 7 April 1910 in Reval and was buried in Alexander Nevsky cemetery on 10 April. He is generally regarded as an honest, decent mayor who was sympathetic to the concerns of the Estonian population of Tallinn. Prominent politician and former mayor of Tallinn Edgar Savisaar wrote that Hiatsintov "was a mayor in a big sense of responsibility and thoughtful attitude", and that he "is proof that the value of a person is not his nationality or his origin - but in his ability to create values as an exemplary, honest, and decent town citizen and city leader".

== See also ==
- List of mayors of Tallinn
