= Eugen Edmund Eduard Erbe =

Baltic German lawyer and politician

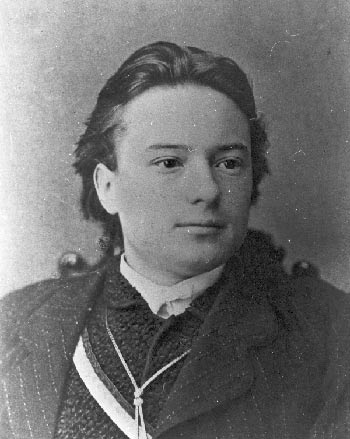

Deputy mayor of Tallinn
- In office December 1905 – May 1906
- Preceded by: Erast Hiatsintov
- Succeeded by: Voldemar Lender

Personal details
- Born: 5 November 1847 Reval, Russian Empire (modern-day Tallinn, Estonia)
- Died: 22 January 1908 (aged 60) Reval, Russian Empire
- Spouse: Marie von Landesen

Eugen Edmund Eduard Erbe (5 November 1847 – 22 January 1908) was a Baltic German lawyer, judge, and politician who was the deputy mayor of Reval (now Tallinn) from December 1905 to May 1906. He graduated from the University of Tartu's Faculty of Law. He practiced law and was a judge in what is now Estonia. He was a judge in the Estonian higher court. He eventually became a city councilor from 1883 to 1906. He eventually became the deputy mayor of the city from December 1905 to May 1906 while the position was vacated. He was succeeded by Voldemar Lender. Erbe was also president of the St. Olaf's Church convention.

== See also ==
- List of mayors of Tallinn
