= Artur Terras =

Estonian politician

Mayor of Tallinn
- In office 24 August 1941 – September 1944
- Preceded by: Kristjan Seaver (as chairman of the Executive Committee)
- Succeeded by: Aleksander Kiidelmaa (as chairman of the Executive Committee)

Personal details
- Born: 18 February 1901 Perjatsi, Governorate of Estonia
- Died: 23 November 1963 (aged 62) Stockholm, Sweden

Artur Terras (18 February 1901 – 23 November 1963) was an Estonian lawyer and politician who was the mayor of Tallinn from 24 August 1941 to September 1944. His older brother was former Estonian State Secretary Karl Terras.

After being deported in 1941, he was a Forest Brothers guerrilla fighter in Vihasoo, eventually becoming the commander of the North Estonian Omakaitse. He was the mayor of Tallinn during the majority of World War II, being mayor while Estonia was occupied by Nazi German forces. He assumed numerous titles, including mayor, lord mayor and first mayor (Erster Bürgermeister). He resigned in September 1944 after the Soviet Union reconquered Estonia. He was succeeded by Aleksander Kiidelmaa as chairman of the executive committee of Tallinn.

He eventually fled to Sweden and became a minister without portfolio of prime minister Otto Tief from 20 April 1952. He died on 23 November 1963 in Stockholm.

== See also ==
- List of mayors of Tallinn
