= Jaak Tamm =

Estonian politician and businessman

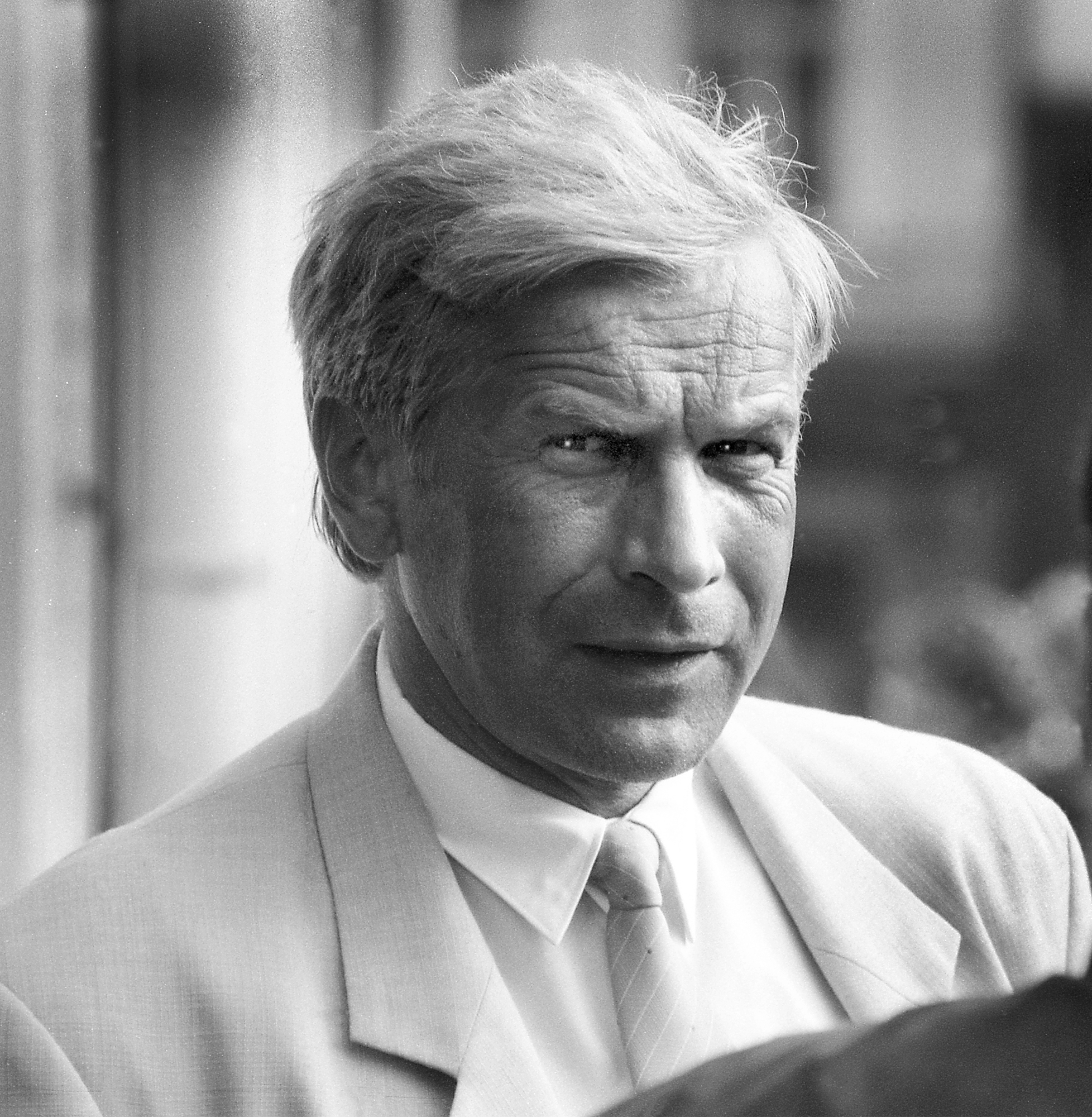
Jaak Tamm (1992)

Jaak Tamm (25 February 1950 – 4 January 1999) was an Estonian politician and businessman.

From 1990 to 1991, he was the minister of industry and energetics in Edgar Savisaar's government. He was a member of the Estonian Coalition Party. From 15 April 1992 to 31 October 1996, he was the mayor of Tallinn. From 1998 to his death in 1999 he was mayor of the town of Sillamäe.

He died of heart disease on 4 January 1999.

Political offices
Preceded by Hardo Aasmäe	Mayor of Tallinn; 1992–1996	Succeeded by Priit Vilba
