= Jaan Poska =

Estonian politician (1866–1920)

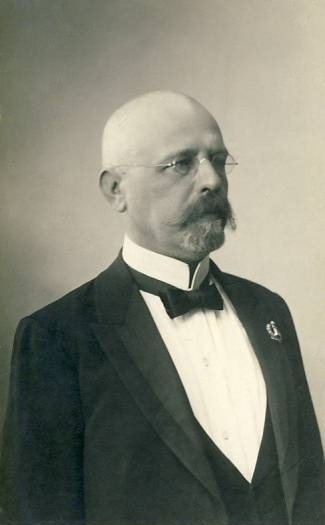

Minister of Foreign Affairs
- In office 24 February 1918 – 20 September 1919
- Preceded by: Position established
- Succeeded by: Ants Piip

Mayor of Tallinn
- In office 1913–1917
- Preceded by: Voldemar Lender
- Succeeded by: Gavriil Beljagin

Personal details
- Born: 24 January 1866 Laiusevälja, Kreis Dorpat, Governorate of Livonia
- Died: 7 March 1920 (aged 54) Tallinn, Estonia
- Education: University of Tartu

Jaan Poska VR III/1 (Estonian pronunciation: [ˈjɑːn ˈposkɑ]; 24 January [O.S. 12 January] 1866, Laiusevälja, near Jõgeva, Estonia – 7 March 1920, Tallinn, Estonia) was a lawyer, politician and the foreign minister of Estonia in 1918–1919.

== Early life ==
Poska was born the fifth of 12 children of an Eastern Orthodox parish schoolmaster and received his secondary education at the church's school in Riga. He entered medical school at the University of Tartu, but soon transferred to law where he graduated in 1890. Poska was the first native Estonian-speaking person admitted to the bar in Tallinn, where he worked as barrister.

== Career ==
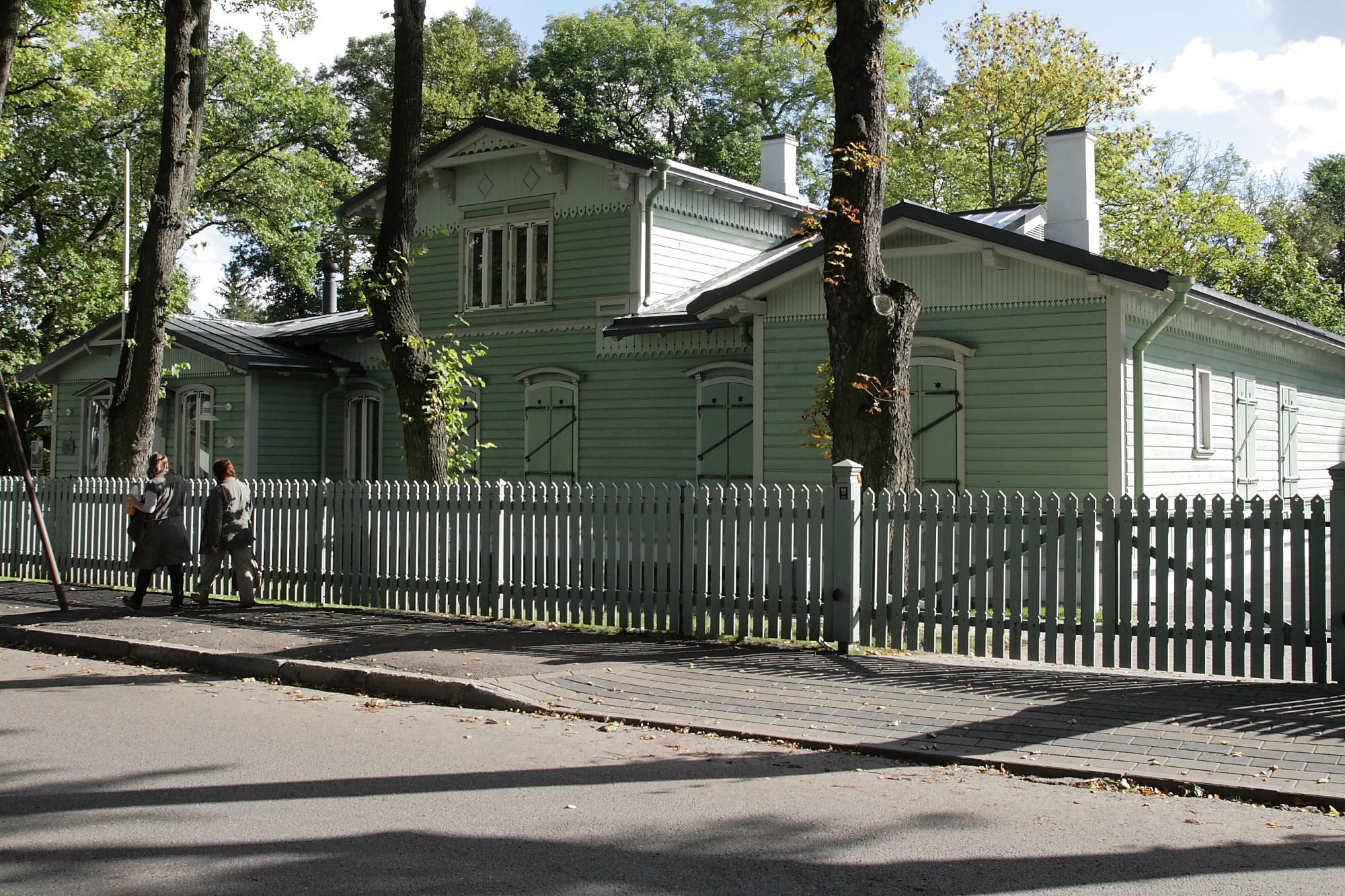
Jaan Poska's home (now at Poska Street, Kadriorg, Tallinn)

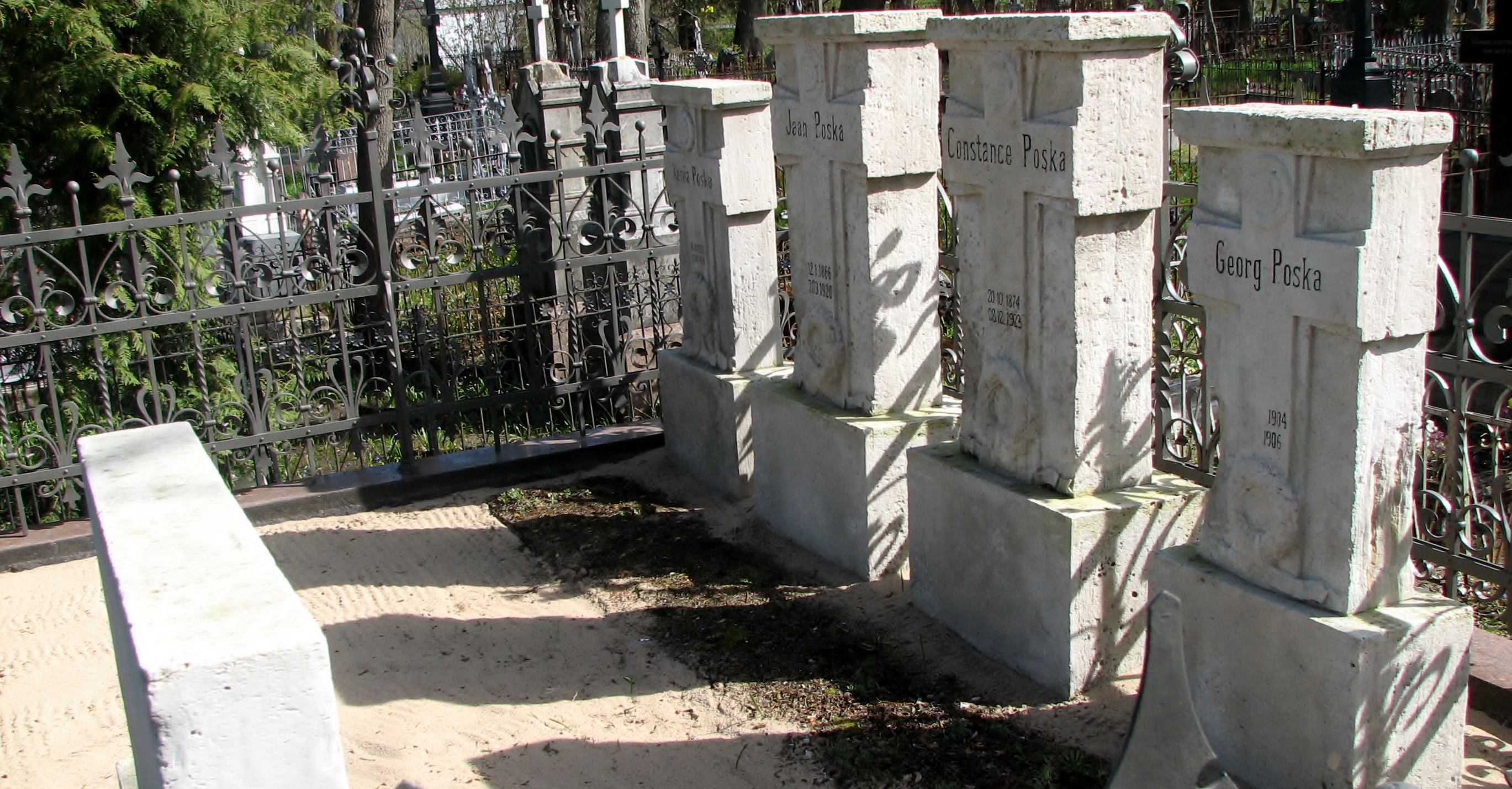
Graves of Jaan Poska and family in Tallinn

Jaan Poska was the mayor of Tallinn from 1913 to 1917. In that position he supported reforms such as reforming healthcare and founding two schools. In April 1917, he became the governor of the Autonomous Governorate of Estonia. On 28 November [O.S. 15 November] 1917 the Maapäev refused to recognize the new Bolshevik rule and proclaimed itself the supreme legal authority of Estonia. The Republic of Estonia declared independence on 24 February 1918, only to be occupied by the German Empire until the end of World War I in November 1918. The following Estonian War of Independence against the Soviet Russian invasion lasted until February 1920.

On 24 February 1918, Poska was appointed the Minister of Foreign Affairs of Estonia. He worked in Western Europe for gaining diplomatic recognition to Estonia and participated in Paris Peace Conference. He led the peace talks with Soviet Russia and achieved Treaty of Tartu which was signed on 2 February 1920. He also helped to write the first Estonian constitution.

Poska died unexpectedly on 7 March 1920 at the age of 54. He was the first Estonian ever to be given a state funeral and over 20,000 people attended it.

== Personal life ==
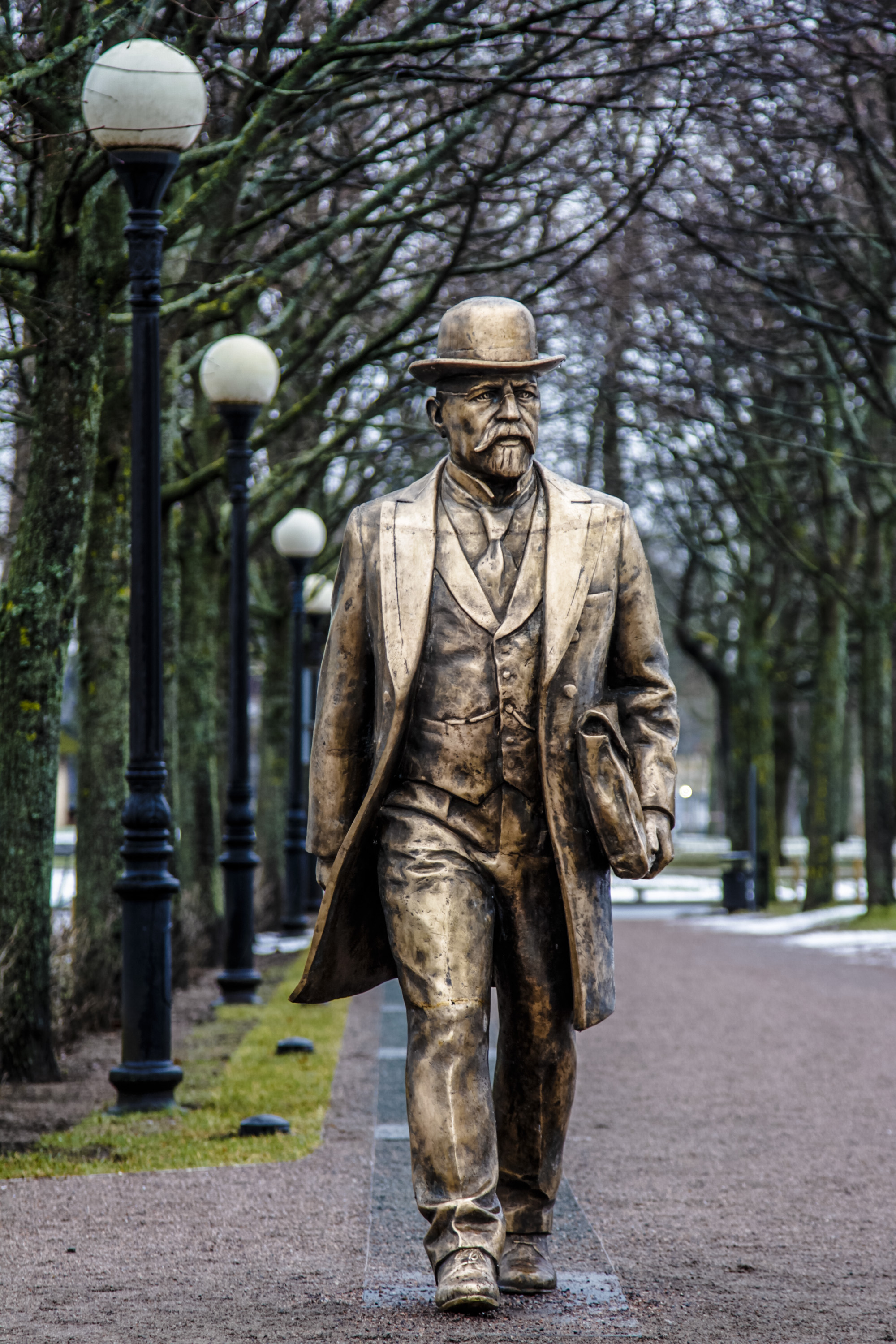
Jaan Poska Memorial in Kadriorg Park, Tallinn by sculptor Elo Liiv

Poska's daughter Vera Poska-Grünthal was a leading Estonian feminist and lawyer who was married to politician and lawyer Timotheus Grünthal. The American lawyer Sharon L. Gleason is Jaan Poska's great granddaughter. The Canadian actress Alison Pill is Poska's great great granddaughter.

== See also ==
- Estonian War of Independence
- Paris Peace Conference (1919–1920)
- Treaty of Tartu (Russian–Estonian)

== Citations ==
- Ülo Kaevats et al. 2000. Eesti Entsüklopeedia 14. Tallinn: Eesti Entsüklopeediakirjastus, ISBN 9985-70-064-3

=== Cited sources ===
- Miljan, Toivo (2004). Historical Dictionary of Estonia. Maryland, USA: Scarecrow Press. ISBN 0-8108-4904-6.

Political offices
Preceded by Voldemar Lender	Mayor of Tallinn; 1913–1917	Succeeded by Gavriil Beljagin
Preceded by none	Governor of Estonia; 1917–1918	Succeeded by Imperial German occupation
Preceded by (no such position)	Minister of Foreign Affairs; February 24, 1918–1919	Succeeded by Ants Piip
