= Aleksander Pallas =

Estonian lawyer and politician

Deputy mayor of Tallinn (acting)
- In office 13 November 1918 – 25 November 1918
- Preceded by: Erhard Arnold Julius Dehio (as lord mayor); Alexander Riesenkampff (as second mayor)
- Succeeded by: Aleksander Hellat

Personal details
- Born: 10 September 1887 Hageri, Governorate of Estonia, Russian Empire
- Died: 7 January 1939 (aged 51) Tallinn, Estonia

Aleksander Pallas (10 September 1887 – 7 January 1939) was an Estonian lawyer and politician who was the acting deputy mayor of Tallinn from 13 November to 25 November 1917. He graduated from the Faculty of Law at Moscow State University. A lawyer in Tallinn, he worked alongside Otto Strandman as a city councilor. He participated in the Estonian War of Independence. Pallas was the first mayor after the German occupation of Estonia during World War I, serving as the acting deputy mayor for all of 12 days. Despite being temporary, the brief mayoralty set the stage for the building up of Tallinn as the capital of Estonia. He was succeeded by Aleksander Hellat. He died on 7 January 1939 and was buried at Alexander Nevsky cemetery.

== See also ==
- List of mayors of Tallinn
