= Gavriil Beljagin =

Russian-Estonian politician

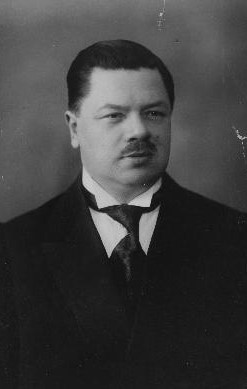

Mayor of Tallinn
- In office April 1917 – September 1917
- Preceded by: Jaan Poska
- Succeeded by: Voldemar Vöölmann (as chairman of city government)

Personal details
- Born: 22 April 1870
- Died: 9 August 1936 (aged 66) Tallinn, Estonia

Gavriil Filippovich Beljagin (also went by Gabriel; Russian: Гавриил Филиппович Белягин; 22 April 1870 – 9 August 1936) was a Russian-Estonian politician who was the mayor of Reval (now Tallinn) from April 1917 to September of that year.

== Career ==
Beljagin was a merchant that opened a tea, sugar, and coffee business around in autumn of 1906. He probably transferred the operations of his company in 1913; for example, in April 1913 the G. D. Galaktionov warehouse for tea, coffee, sugar, rice, cocoa and other goods was trading "under the company of G. F. Beljagin."

Beljagin was Tallinn's commissioner until he was selected by Mayor Jaan Poska to serve as deputy mayor in April 1917, when Poska went on to become the commissar of the Autonomous Governorate of Estonia. Beljagin oversaw the establishment of Estonian as the official language of Reval. He resigned just before the October Revolution and the start of the Russian Civil War in late 1917. He was succeeded by Voldemar Vöölmann as the chairman of city government.

By 1921, Beljagin had resumed the activities of his commercial office, once again trading in sugar, rice, and tea. In the 1930s, Beljagin was a distributor in Estonia for Nash Motors.

Beljagin died on 9 August 1936 and is buried at Siselinna Cemetery.

== See also ==
- List of mayors of Tallinn
