= Erhard Arnold Julius Dehio =

Baltic German merchant and politician

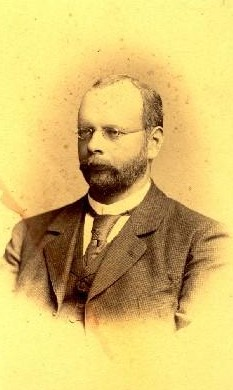

Lord mayor of Tallinn
- In office March 1918 – 13 November 1918
- Preceded by: Voldemar Vöölmann (as chair of the city government of Tallinn)
- Succeeded by: Aleksander Pallas (as acting deputy mayor)

Personal details
- Born: 16 January 1855 Reval, Russian Empire (modern-day Tallinn, Estonia)
- Died: 12 July 1940 (aged 85) Bad Oeynhausen, Germany

Erhard Arnold Julius Dehio (16 January 1855 – 12 July 1940) was a Baltic German merchant and politician who was the lord mayor of Tallinn from March 1918 to 13 November 1918, with Alexander Riesenkampff as second mayor. A notable grain exporter, he traded throughout Europe in the late 19th century. First a city councilor, he was the lord mayor of Tallinn during the German occupation of Estonia during World War I, when the German Empire occupied most of newly independent Estonia, including Tallinn. After the occupation ended and Estonia became an independent republic, Dehio resigned as mayor and left for Germany, eventually setting up his headquarters in Lübeck. He was succeeded by Aleksander Pallas. He would be the last Baltic German mayor of Tallinn. He died in 1940 in Bad Oeynhausen.

== See also ==
- List of mayors of Tallinn
