= Elfriede Lender =

Estonian school director and teacher (1882–1974)

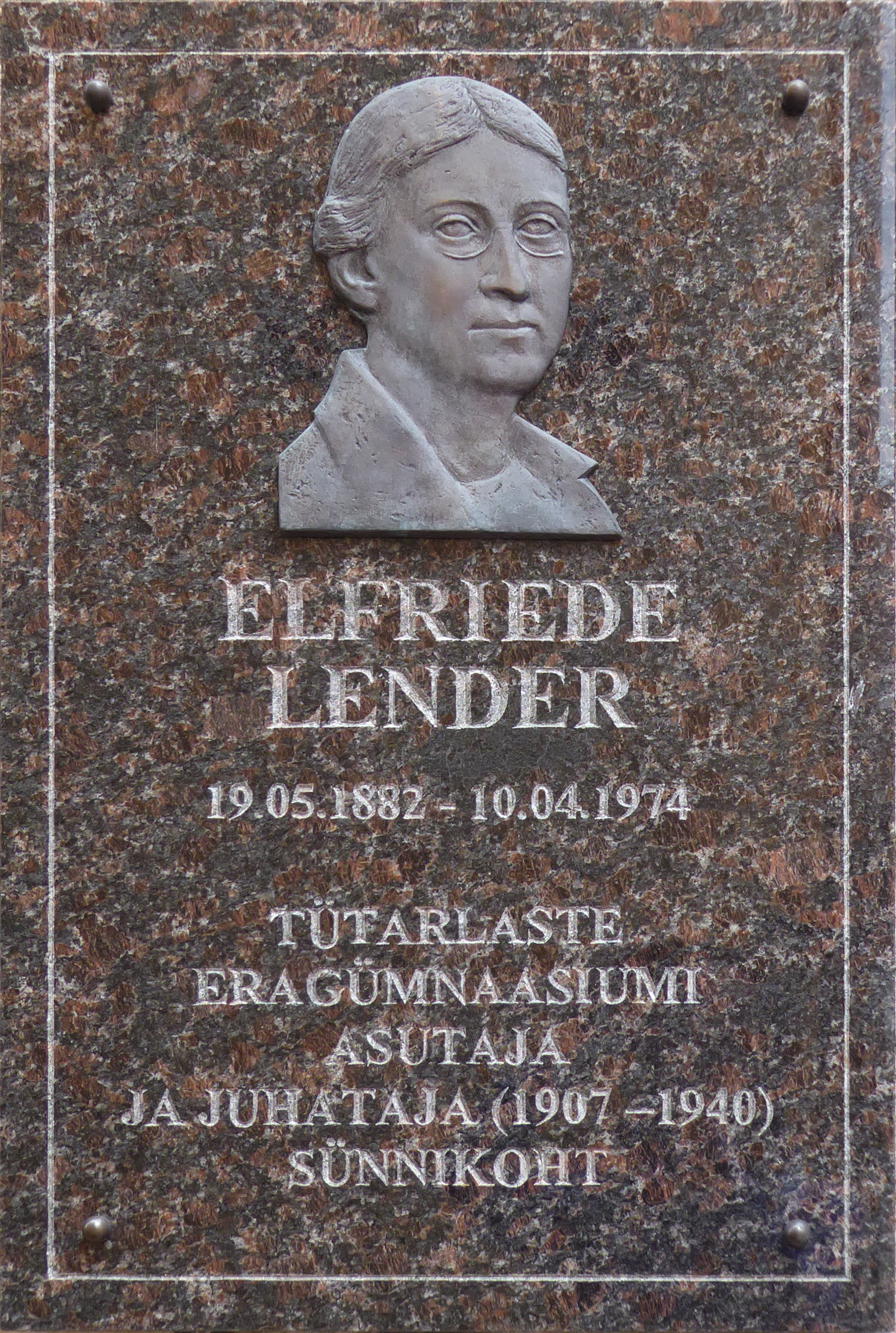
Plaque at Lender's birthplace in Tallinn

Elfriede Amanda Lender (19 May 1882 Tallinn – 10 April 1974 Stockholm) was an Estonian teacher. Lender was the founder of the first Estonian-language girls' school in Estonia.

She started working as a teacher in Tallinn in 1901 and opened a free school for boys and girls in 1906. In 1907, she established Elfriede Lender Private High School (:et), where Estonian girls could study. From 1920 until 1927, she studied at the University of Tartu. In 1937 she established a teacher training school for preschool educators (Estonian: lasteaednike seminar).

In 1944 she fled to Sweden. From 1945 until 1962, she worked in Stockholm.

She was married to the engineer Voldemar Lender. There is a memorial to Elfriede and Voldemar in Tallinn.

== Works ==
- Minu lastele (Stockholm, 1967, Tallinn, 2000, 2010)
