= Johannes Undusk =

Estonian politician (1918–1979)

Chairman of the Executive Committee of Tallinn
- In office 27 March 1961 – June 1971
- Preceded by: Aleksander Hendrikson
- Succeeded by: Ivar Kallion

Personal details
- Born: 10 September 1918 Pskov Oblast, Russian SFSR, Soviet Union
- Died: 28 March 1979 (aged 60) Tallinn, Estonia
- Party: Communist Party of Estonia
- Spouse: Irene Felicitas
- Children: 1; Feliks Undusk

Johannes Undusk (10 September 1918 – 28 March 1979) was an Estonian Communist politician who was the chairman of the executive committee of Tallinn from 27 March 1961 to June 1971.

Undusk graduated from the Leningrad Oblast School of Cultural Studies in 1940, and started working as a club manager. During World War II, he joined the Estonian Shooting Corps. During the post-war years, he was elected second secretary of the Estonian Central Committee, and later the first secretary of the Central Committee of the Central Bank of the ECB. He also worked at the Estonian SSR Council of Ministers. He was the chairman of the Committee on Culture Education Institutions and the first secretary of the Tartu City Committee. In 1955, he was promoted to the head of the propaganda and agitation department of the Communist Party of Estonia Central Committee. From 1971 to his death in 1979, he was the chairman of the Estonian Association for Friendship and Cultural Relations. The organization served as a promoter of foreign policy and as a proponent of Estonian Soviet-era achievements. He was also elected as the Ambassador of the Supreme Soviet of the USSR and the Estonian SSR, a member of the Communist Party's Central Committee, and a member of the executive committee of Tallinn.

From 1961 to 1971, he was the chairman of the executive committee of Tallinn, developing the city. He oversaw the opening of the passenger ferry between Tallinn and Helsinki, Finland in 1965. He was succeeded by Ivar Kallion.

Undusk died on 28 March 1979 and is buried at Metsakalmistu.

His son is television journalist and politician Feliks Undusk.

== See also ==
- List of mayors of Tallinn
