= Hardo Aasmäe =

Estonian politician, geographer, and encyclopedist

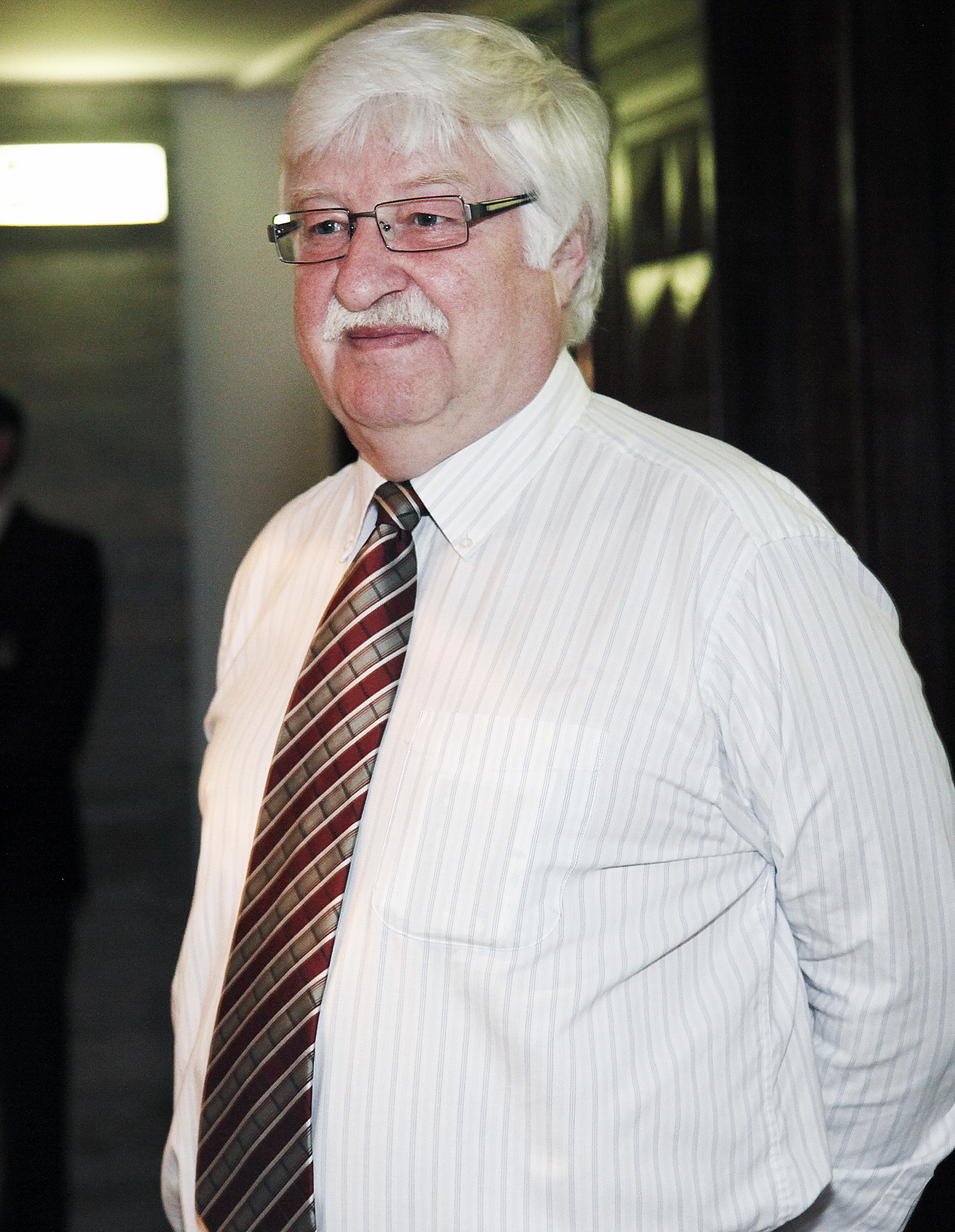
- Hardo Aasmäe in 2013

Mayor of Tallinn
- In office 16 January 1990 – 11 March 1992
- Preceded by: Harri Lumi
- Succeeded by: Jaak Tamm

Personal details
- Born: 11 February 1951 Rannamõisa, Martna Parish, Lääne County, then part of Estonian SSR, Soviet Union
- Died: 29 December 2014 (aged 63) Tallinn, Estonia
- Party: Estonian People's Front
- Education: University of Tartu, Leningrad State University
- Profession: Radio producer, geographer

Hardo Aasmäe (11 February 1951 – 29 December 2014) was an Estonian geographer, entrepreneur and politician.

He was active in the Estonian People's Front, and he was the last chairman of the Executive Committee of Tallinn from 16 January 1990 to 20 August 1991 and the first post-Soviet mayor of Tallinn, from 20 August 1991 until 11 March 1992, however starting as mayor under the old communist system on 16 January 1990.

For many years, Aasmäe was the editor-in-chief of Estonian Encyclopedia. Aasmäe produced many radio shows and was a member of Tarkade klubi, an Estonian question-and-answer radio programme, for many years. He was a member of the Estonian section of the Club of Rome.

== Death ==
On 29 December 2014, Aasmäe died following an accidental fall down a staircase from the third floor of his office at the Estonian Encyclopedia publishing house in Tallinn.

== Awards ==
- 3rd Class of the Order of the National Coat of Arms (received 23 February 2006)

Political offices
Preceded by Harri Lumi	Mayor of Tallinn; 1990–1992	Succeeded by Jaak Tamm
