= Estonian Soviet Encyclopedia =

Estonian encyclopedia published 1968-1976

- Language: Estonian
- Subject: General
- Genre: Reference encyclopaedia
- Publication place: Estonian SSR, USSR

The Estonian Soviet Encyclopedia (Estonian: Eesti nõukogude entsüklopeedia, abbreviated ENE) is an Estonian general encyclopedia that was published from 1968 to 1976. The publisher was Valgus.

The editor-in-chief was Gustav Naan.

It consists of eight volumes.
