= Wilhelm Greiffenhagen =

Baltic German journalist and politician (1821–1890)

Thomas Wilhelm Greiffenhagen
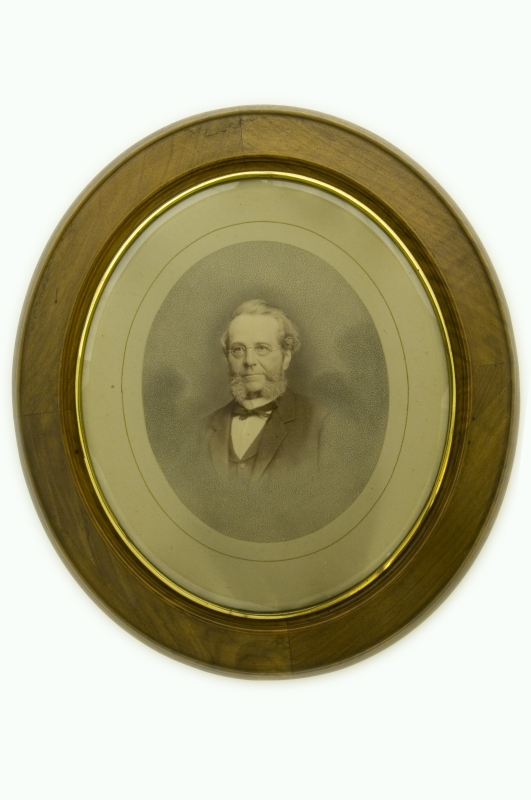
- Wilhelm Greiffenhagen, photographed by Charles Borchardt.

Mayor of Tallinn
- In office June 1883 – August 1885
- Preceded by: Alexander Rudolf Karl von Uexküll
- Succeeded by: Viktor von Maydell

Personal details
- Born: 21 November 1821; Arkhangelsk, Russian Empire
- Died: 28 December 1890 (aged 69); Reval, Russian Empire (modern-day Tallinn, Estonia)

Thomas Wilhelm Greiffenhagen (19 November 1821 – 28 December 1890) was a Baltic German journalist and politician who was the mayor of Reval (now Tallinn) from June 1883 to August 1885.

The son of Germans from Schleswig and East Prussia, he studied jurisprudence at what is now the University of Tartu in Dorpat (modern-day Tartu), as well as in Bonn, Heidelberg, and Berlin. He was one of the editors of the German-language magazine Revalsche Zeitung, Estonia's first political newspaper, and was its editor-in-chief from 1864 to 1867. He was the mayor of Reval from June 1883 to August 1885, being disposed of by the governor of the Governorate of Estonia, Mikhail Shakhovskoy-Glebov-Strezhnev, after refusing to use the Russian language in official correspondence. He called for greater political participation of the Estonian peasants in the political decision-making process and thus opposed the influential circles of the Estonian Knighthood. He was succeeded by Viktor von Maydell. One of his sons, Otto Greiffenhagen, was a prominent historian, archivist and music critic.

== See also ==
- List of mayors of Tallinn
