= Birsen =

- Gender: Female

Origin
- Language: Turkish
- Meaning: "Only You"

Birsen is a common feminine Turkish given name. It is also used as a surname, and less commonly a masculine given name. The name is produced by using two Turkish words: Bir and Sen. In Turkish, "Bir" means "One", and "Sen" means "You". Thus, "Birsen" means "Only You".

== Given name ==
- Birsen Yavuz (born 1980), Turkish sprinter

== Surname ==
- Metecan Birsen (born 1995), Turkish basketball player
- Osman Birsen (born 1945), Turkish high-ranking civil servant
