= Aleksander Hendrikson =

Estonian politician, communist

Chairman of the Executive Committee of Tallinn
- In office 17 September 1945 – 27 March 1961
- Preceded by: Ado Kurvits
- Succeeded by: Johannes Undusk

Personal details
- Born: 23 November 1895 Tallinn, Governorate of Estonia, Russian Empire
- Died: 4 October 1977 (aged 81) Tallinn, Estonia
- Resting place: Metsakalmistu
- Party: Communist Party of Estonia

Aleksander Hendrikson (23 November 1895 – 4 October 1977) was an Estonian Soviet communist politician who was the chairman of the executive committee of Tallinn from 17 September 1945 to 27 March 1961.

== Biography ==
=== Early life and career ===
Hendrikson was born into a worker's family, graduated from primary school in 1910 and went to work as a student of a locksmith at a paper mill. Until 1918, he worked in several industrial plants, and from 1914 to 1918, he worked as a locksmith at the wagon construction workshop at Dvigatel. A member of the Estonian Communist Party since 1917, in 1918, when the German forces invaded Tallinn, he left with the Red Army on a war ship to Helsinki, volunteering to join the Baltic Fleet. He served in Kronstadt on the ship "Respublika". He later fought in the 1918 Battle of Narva and the Estonian War of Independence for the Soviet Union. After the Estonian side won out, Hendrikson left for Leningrad. The Politburo of the Baltic Fleet sent Hendrikson in 1921 to study at the Estonian Labor Faculty in Leningrad. He graduated in 1924. During the summer he worked as a freighter on a cargo ship, traveled between England, Germany, Sweden, and Finland. He then entered Leningrad's F. Engels National Institute of Economics, where he graduated from the Industrial Department in 1929 and was sent to work as an engineer at the Leningrad Chemistry Department's Planning Department. The trust was reorganized in the 1930s to Lakokraska, and Hendrikson was appointed to head the economic planning department.

In 1932, he was appointed director of the chemical plant Respublika, where he worked until 1934, when he was mobilizing the Central Committee of the Communist Party of the Soviet Union to work in agriculture and sent to Chelyabinsk Oblast as a director of the grain farm "Burano". He worked there until 1939, when he was released on his own request. Hendrikson traveled back to Leningrad and started working as an art paint factory manager at the Department of Labor and Technical Regulation. In 1941, he was appointed as the chief of the mineral raw materials department, where he worked until June 1944.

=== In Estonia ===
In June 1944, Hendrikson was sent to the Central Committee of the Communist Party of Estonia and was appointed Deputy Secretary of the Central Committee in the field of industry. By decision of the Bureau of the Central Committee, Hendrikson was appointed EC Bureau Chief Commercial Officer of the Industrial Division, and by decision on 7 October 1944, as Deputy Secretary of Industry and Head of Industry. By decision of the Bureau on 3 February 1945, he was approved as secretary to the Tallinn City Committee.

By decision of the Bureau on 17 September 1945, Hendrikson was appointed chairman of the executive committee of Tallinn. He was the chairman until 27 March 1961. He was the chairman in the immediate aftermath of World War II. He was remembered as a loyal member of the Communist party and for his organizational abilities in regards to the clearing of the damage of Tallinn after the war. At the session of the Central Bank Office of the ECB in 1961, Hendrikson applied for a federal personal pension starting 1 March and the decision of the Tallinn LK Office on 29 March was to dismiss Hendrikson as chairman of the executive committee in connection with his retirement. This was presented to the Presidium of the Supreme Council of the Estonian SSR for reward. After retiring, Hendrikson, from 1963 to his death in 1977, had been chairing a non-partisan commission at the Tallinn City Committee. After his retirement, he worked extensively with the youth legions of the Communist Party of Estonia. He was succeeded by Johannes Undusk.

Hendrikson was a member of the Supreme Soviet of the Estonian SSR, and was a member of the Central Committee of the Estonian SSR from 1948 to 1963.

From 1954 to 1958, he was the envoy to the Supreme Council of the Soviet Union until 18 March 1962, since 1958 worked in the Economic Affairs Committee of the Council of Nationalities.

== Personal life ==
Hendrikson's wife was Aneta (born 1893), with whom he had three children: sons Leonid (born 1926) and Viktor (born 1939), and daughter Ljudmila (born 1937).

Aleksander died on 4 October 1977 and was buried in Metsakalmistu.

== Awards ==
- Order of Lenin (2x)
- Order of the October Revolution

== See also ==
- List of mayors of Tallinn
