= Karin Hallas-Murula =

Estonian architecture historian

Karin Hallas-Murula (before 2000 Karin Hallas; born in 1957 in Kiviõli) is an Estonian architecture historian.

In 1992 she finished her doctoral studies in Moscow.

1991-2010 she was the head of Estonian Architecture Museum.

She has researched mainly the late 19th and 20th century architecture, especially in Estonia.

She is a member of Europa Nostra's board.

Awards:

- 2002 Order of the White Star, V class.
