= Torupilli =

Subdistrict of Tallinn, Estonia

Coordinates: 59°25′53.28″N 24°46′29.31″E

- Subdistrict of Tallinn
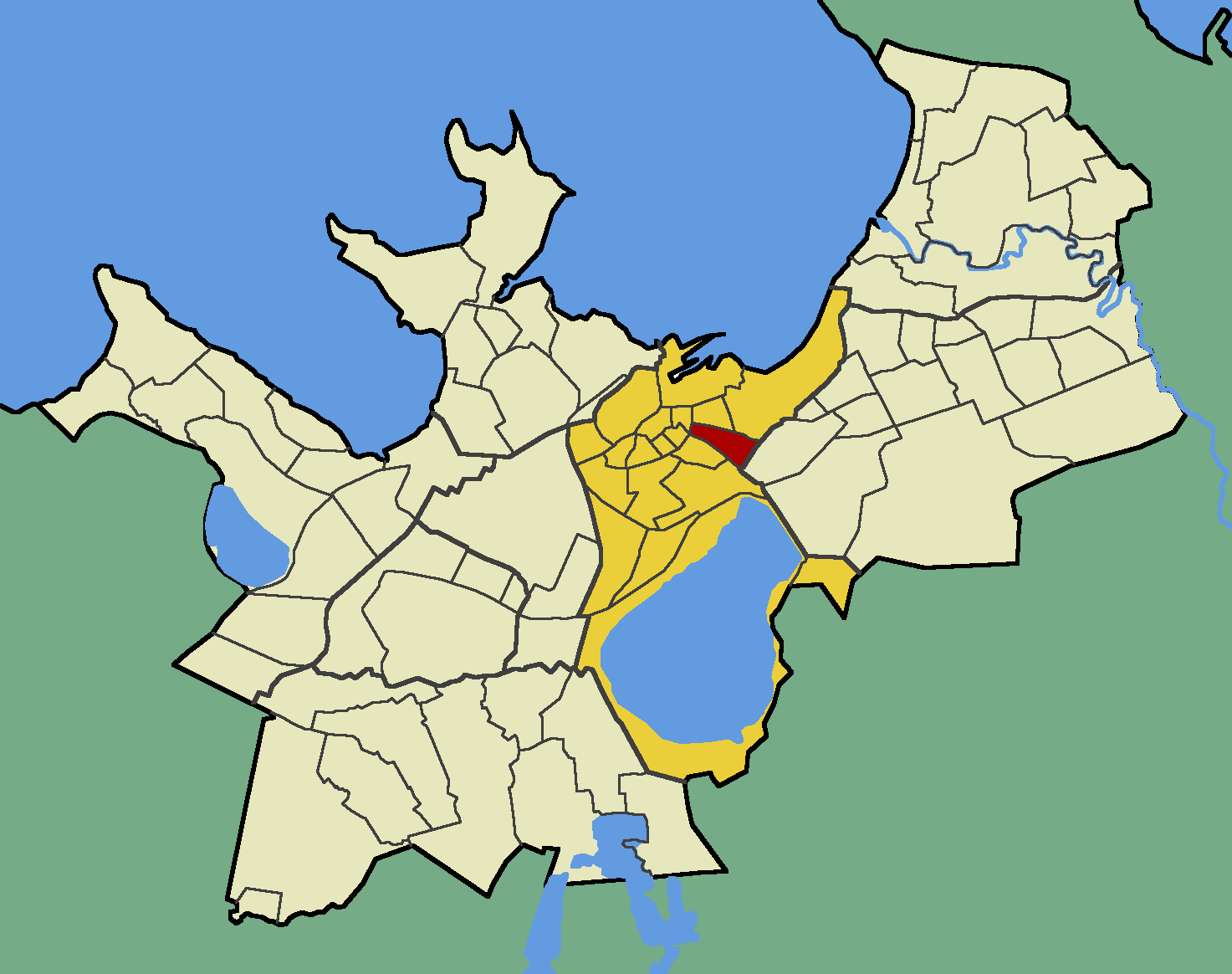
- Torupilli within the Kesklinn (City Center) district
- Country: Estonia
- County: Harju County
- City: Tallinn
- District: Kesklinn

Population (01.01.2014)
  - Total: 3,729

Torupilli (Estonian for 'bagpipe') is a subdistrict (asum) in the district of the Kesklinn (City Center) district in Tallinn, the capital of Estonia. It has a population of 3,729 (As of 1 January 2014).

== Name ==
Torupilli is named after the Torupilli Inn, which stood across the street at the intersection of Tartu Street (Tartu maantee) and C. R. Jakobson Street (C. R. Jakobsoni tänav ). The inn, attested as early as 1803, had an image of a bagpiper on its sign. The name is also seen in the street name Torupilli ots (literally, 'bagpipe end').

== Gallery ==
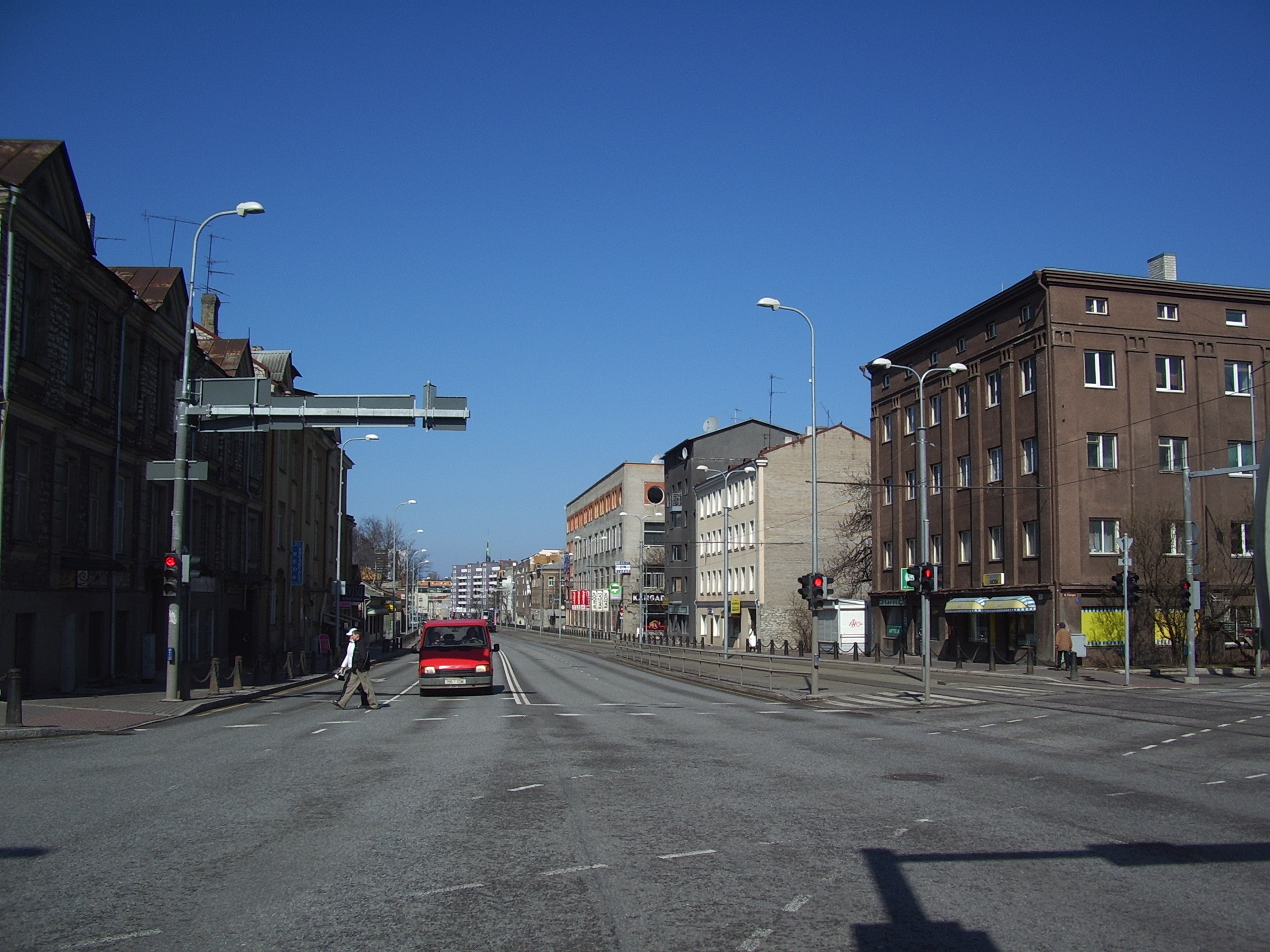
Tartu Street, Torupilli on the right

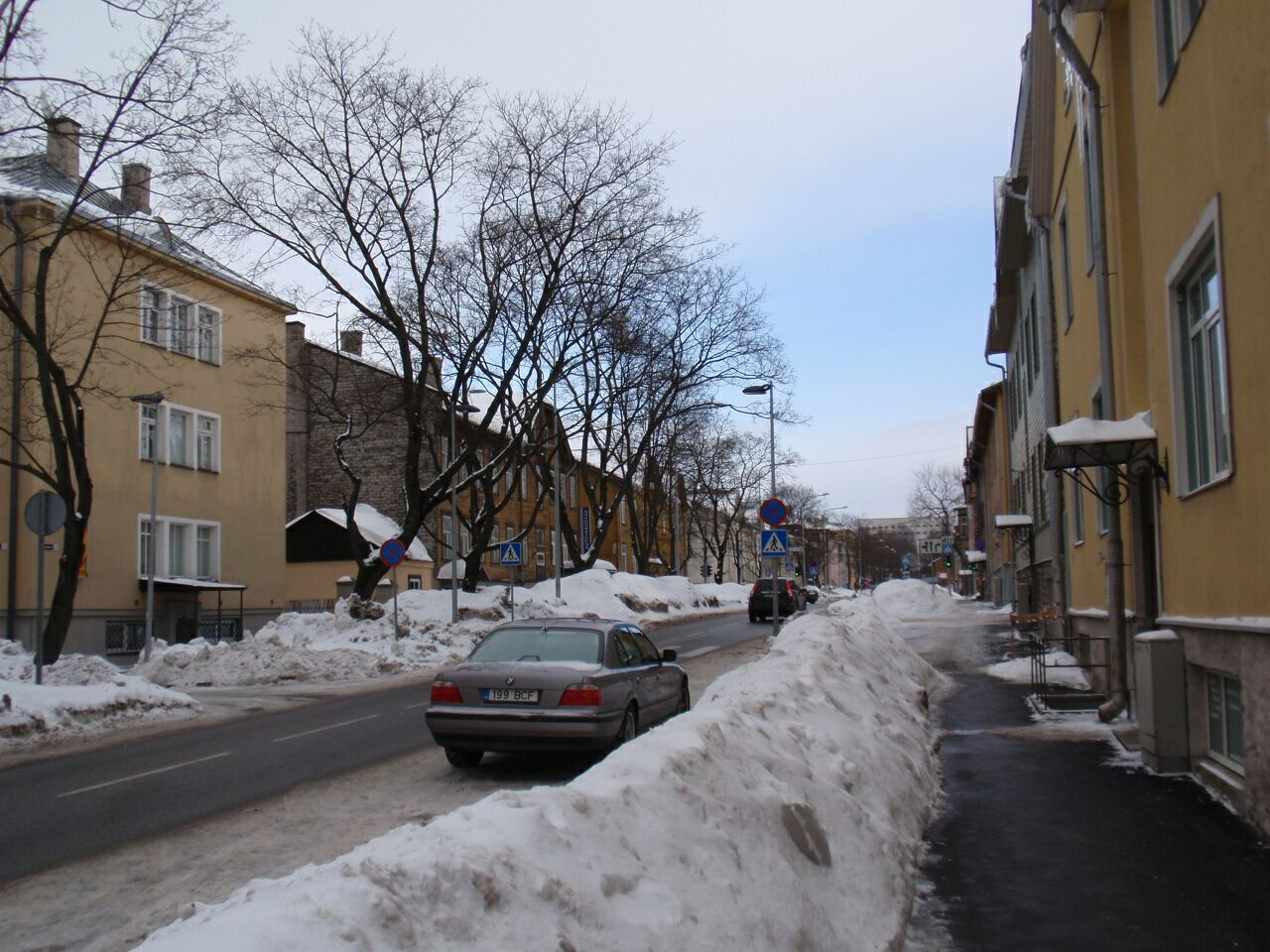
J. Kunder Street

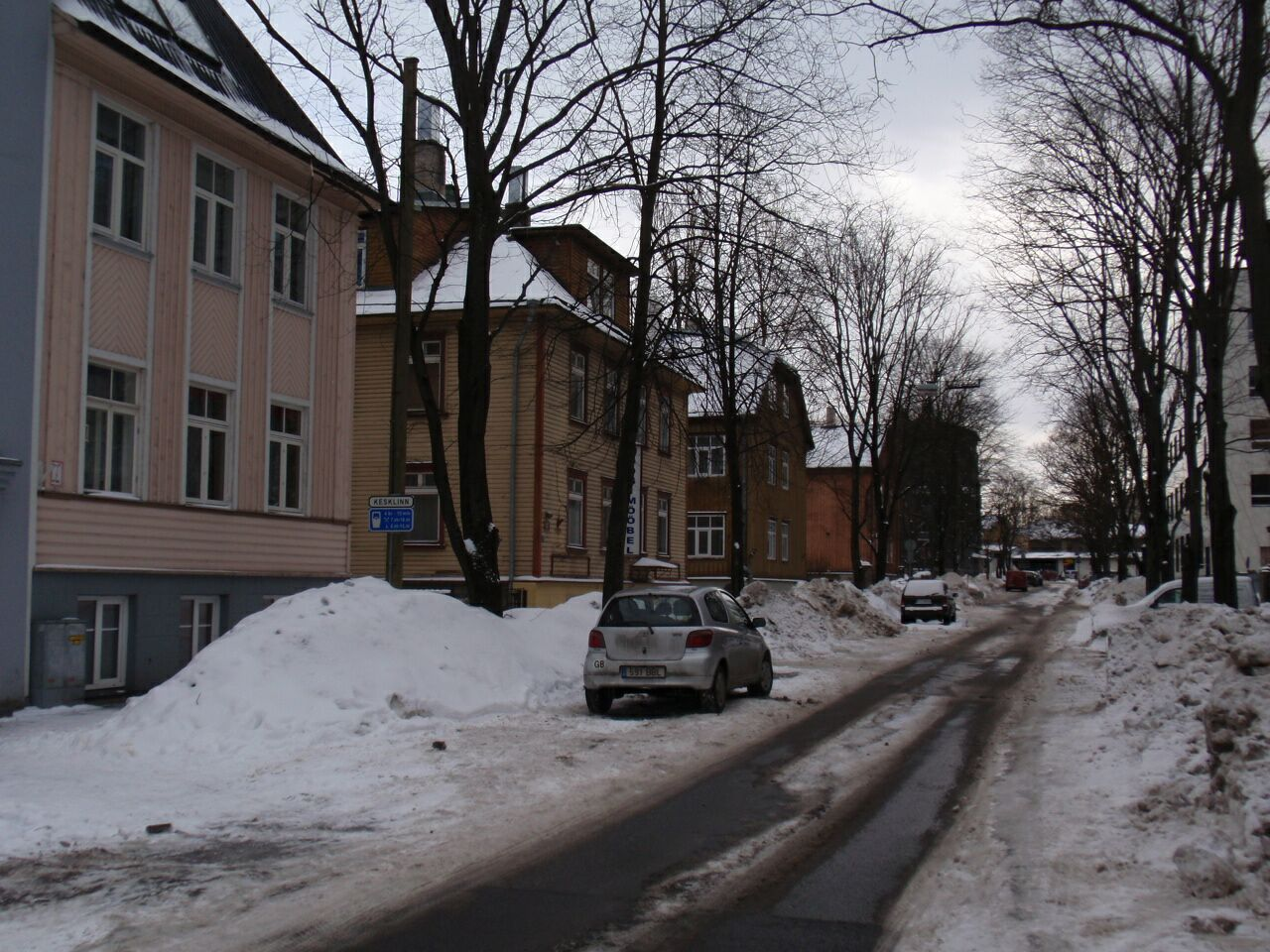
K. A. Hermann Street
