= Viktor von Maydell =

Baltic German engineer and politician

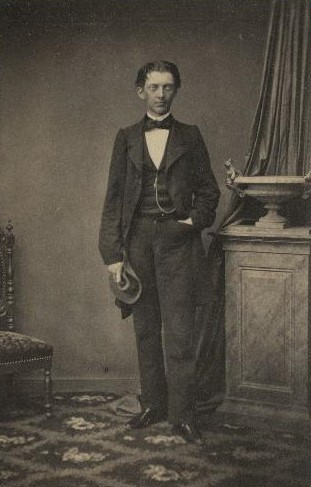

Mayor of Tallinn
- In office December 1885 – July 1894
- Preceded by: Wilhelm Greiffenhagen
- Succeeded by: Eduard Ernst Bätke

Personal details
- Born: 28 August 1838 Haapsal, Russian Empire (modern-day Haapsalu, Estonia)
- Died: 27 January 1898 (aged 59) Stuttgart, Germany

Viktor Karl Jakob von Maydell (28 August 1838 – 27 January 1898), Baron von Maydell, was a Baltic German railway engineer and politician who was the mayor of Reval (now Tallinn) from December 1885 to July 1894.

== Biography ==
Von Maydell was born in what is now Haapsalu, Estonia, but studied first in Heidelberg and then studied engineering at ETH Zurich, where he graduated as an engineer. In Zürich, he was one of the founders of the Corps Baltica-Borussia Danzig zu Bielefeld. After his return to Russia, he joined the railway administration and was the section engineer of the Odessa-Tiraspol section of the Odessa Railway from 1863 to 1872 and the departmental engineer at the Elisavetgrad-Kremenchuk and Kremenchuk-Kharkiv railways. From 1872 to 1873, he was an independent manager of the railway construction on the railway line from Snamenka to Nikolayev. He then settled back in his native Estonia, where he bought the Gut Wiems in Reval. From 1877 onward, he was a homeowner and a city councilor in Reval, and was a part of the city council from 1880 onward. In 1883 he became an assistant to the mayor and was, from 1885 to 1893, the mayor of the city. For a few months before his mayoralty, he was the deputy mayor after the forced resignation of Wilhelm Greiffenhagen. He oversaw the disbandment of the Magistracy of Reval in 1887. For health reasons, he left Reval and settled with his family in Stuttgart, where he died in January 1898. He was succeeded by Eduard Ernst Bätke.

== See also ==
- List of mayors of Tallinn
