= Ülo Kaevats =

Estonian statesman, academic, and philosopher

Ülo Kaevats (29 September 1947 – 30 January 2015) was an Estonian statesman, academic and philosopher.

In 1972, he graduated from the Faculty of Physics and Chemistry of the University of Tartu with a qualification from a physicist and a research philosopher. Kaevats obtained a PhD from Vilnius State University in Lithuania. He served for many years (1989–1992, 1995–2000) as editor-in-chief of the Estonian Encyclopaedia, the main national work of reference; earlier, he worked as a research fellow at the Estonian and the USSR Academies of Sciences, mostly in the history of science field. Until 2011, when he became emeritus, he was professor and chair of philosophy at Tallinn University of Technology. As a scholar, Kaevats specialized in the philosophy of science and the philosophy of technology.

Between 1992 and 1995, during the beginning and re-establishment of independent Estonia, Kaevats served as Secretary of State (Riigisekretär; the most senior civil servant with Constitutional rank) of the Republic.

He died on 30 January 2015.
