= Feliks Undusk =

Estonian politician

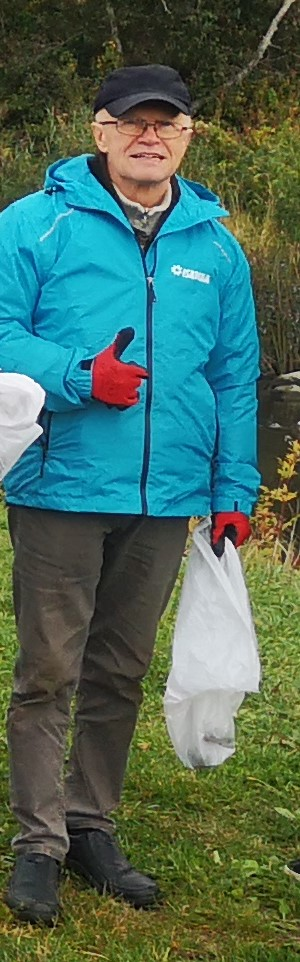
Feliks Undusk in the Pirita river valley on World Cleaning Day

Feliks Undusk (born 23 December 1948) is an Estonian journalist and politician. He was a television presenter on national TV through the 1980s until leaving the industry in 1993. He was a member of 8th Riigikogu (1995–1999).
