= Bernd Baron von Maydell =

German jurist

Bernd Baron von Maydell (1934–2018), also Berend F. von Maydell, was a German lawyer and secondary school teacher, who specialised in social law.

== Life ==
Bernd Baron von Maydell, also Berend F. von Maydell, was born on 19 July 1934 in Tallinn.

After his forced resettlement from Estonia to the province of Posen and his schooling there, Maydell fled to the west with his family in February 1945 and settled in Hesse. He graduated from secondary school in 1954 at the Friedrich Wilhelm School in Eschwege. He then studied law and economics at Marburg University and the Free University of Berlin. His first law degree was awarded in 1958, his doctorate at Marburg University was awarded in the summer of 1960.

Thereafter, von Maydell became a research fellow and lecturer at the University of Bonn, where he obtained a habilitation in 1971 in the subjects of civil law, employment law and social law.

In 1975, von Maydell accepted the chair for social law at the Free University of Berlin, which he held until 1981. He then moved to the University of Bonn and became a full professor of civil law, employment and social law. There he also headed the university's Institute of Employment and Social Security Law. From 1990 to 1992, he was spokesman for the research training group "European and International Business Law".

In February 1992, von Maydell took over the management of the Max Planck Institute for Social Law and Social Policy founded by Hans F. Zacher in Munich. Since then, he has also held an honorary professorship at LMU Munich. He also advised Central and Eastern European countries on social reform issues after the end of the Cold War and the dissolution of the Eastern Bloc.

After his retirement at the end of July 2002, von Maydell continued and expanded his advisory work on an international level. He also participated in the expert committee of the Bertelsmann Foundation "Zielen in den Altenpolitik". He died on 3 May 2018.

== Honours and distinctions ==
- Order of Merit of the Federal Republic of Germany, 1st class
- Order of the Sacred Treasure, Gold Rays (Japan)
- Heinrich Lünendonk Medal for special services in the field of social security
- Visiting scientific member of the Polish Academy of Sciences, Warsaw
- Officer's Cross of the Order of Merit of the Republic of Poland
- Honorary doctorate from the University of Gdańsk
- Medal of cooperation of the Estonian Evangelical Lutheran Church

== Works (selection) ==
- Inhalt und Funktionen eines modernen Volksgruppenrechtes. Dargestellt am Anspruch der Volksgruppen auf eigene Schulen in Deutschland. Marburg, Rechts- und staatswissenschaftliche Fakultät, dissertation, 28 July 1960.
- Geldschuld und Geldwert. Die Bedeutung von Änderungen des Geldwertes für die Geldschulden. Reihe Schriften des Instituts für Arbeits- und Wirtschaftsrecht der Universität zu Köln. Band 32. Zugleich: Bonn, Univ., Rechts- u. Staatswissenschaftliche Fakultät, Habilschrift. 1971/72. C. H. Beck. Munich. 1974. ISBN 3-406-04832-3
- zusammen mit Wolfhart Burdenski, Walter Schellhorn: Kommentar zum Sozialgesetzbuch, Allgemeiner Teil. Luchterhand. Neuwied. 1976. ISBN 3-472-12133-5
- Zusammenarbeit der Leistungsträger und ihre Beziehungen zu Dritten. GK-SGB X 3. Reihe Gemeinschaftskommentar zum Sozialgesetzbuch. Luchterhand. Neuwied. 1984. ISBN 3-472-14249-9
- with Friederike Wütscher (ed.): Enabling social Europe. Reihe Wissenschaftsethik und Technikfolgenbeurteilung. Vol. 26. Springer Verlag. Berlin, Heidelberg, New York. 2006. ISBN 978-3-540-29771-0
- with Peter Axer, Franz Ruland, Ulrich Becker (eds.): Sozialrechtshandbuch (SRH). 5th edn.. Nomos-Verlag. Baden-Baden. 2012. ISBN 978-3-8329-6462-7

== Literature ==
- Festgabe zum 60. Geburtstag. In: Zeitschrift für Sozialreform (ZSR). Issue 7, Jul 1994.
- Winfried Boecken (ed.): Sozialrecht und Sozialpolitik in Deutschland und Europa. Festschrift für Bernd Baron von Maydell. Luchterhand. Neuwied. 2002. ISBN 3-472-05183-3
- Andreas Hänlein, Angelika Nußberger (2018-06-15), "Bernd Baron von Maydell", JuristenZeitung (in German), vol. 73, no. 12, pp. 620–621, doi:10.1628/jz-2018-0152, ISSN 0022-6882
- Franz Ruland: Bernd Baron von Maydell (1934–2018) – ein Nachruf, in: NZS 2018, 488.
- Boecken/Borchert/Breuer/Eylert/Knieps/Kreikebohm/Kretschmer/Kunze/Majerski-Pahlen/Steinmeyer: Obituary for Prof. Dr. Bernd Baron von Maydell, in: NZS 2018, 570.
