= Eveline Adelheid von Maydell =

German artist

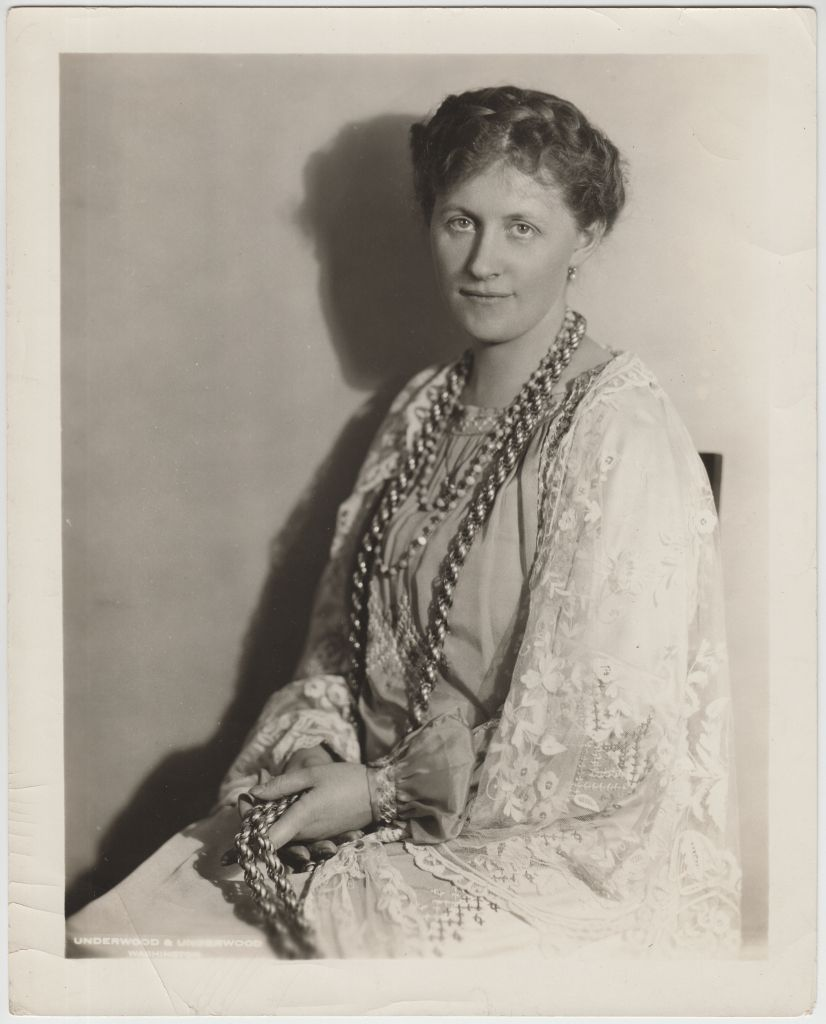
Maydell before the opening of her exhibit at the Corcoran Gallery of Art.

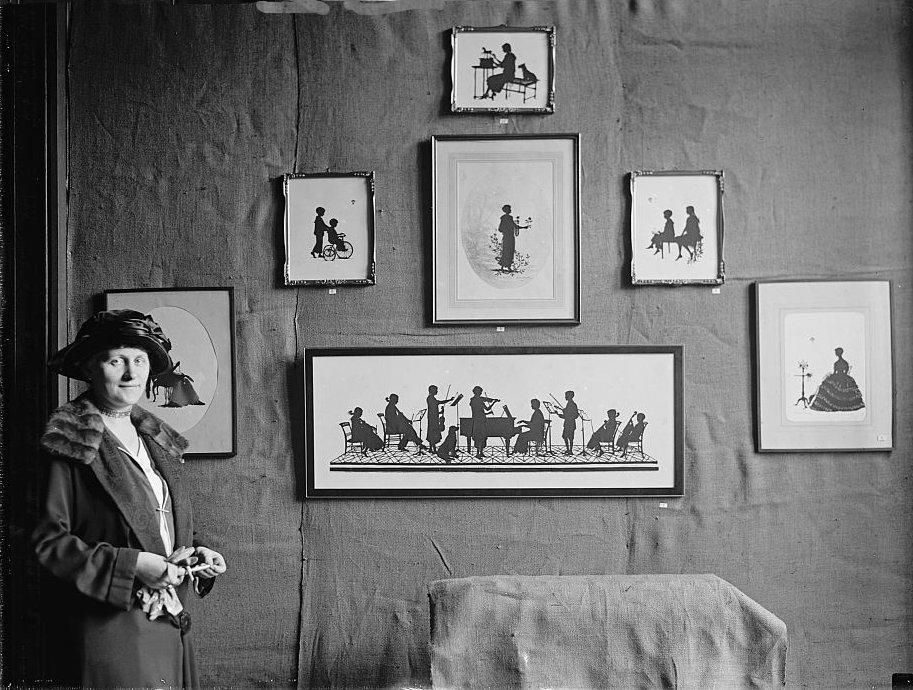
Adelheid and several of her works on display at the Corcoran in 1925

Eveline Adelheid von Maydell (née Frank; 19 May 1890 in Tehran – 24 December 1962 in Sintra) was an ethnic German silhouette artist. Born in Iran, she studied drawing in Pärnu, Estonia, in Riga, Latvia and in St. Petersburg, Russia. She moved to the United States in 1922.

Several of her artworks were exhibited at the Corcoran Gallery of Art in the 1920s, and again in the 1940s.

She is described as being ambidextrous in a Milwaukee newspaper article from 1942: "She sketches and designs with her left hand and with her right snips with minute scissors the silhouettes..."

She died in Portugal on December 24, 1962.
