= Haimre =

Village in Estonia

Coordinates: 58°52′N 24°28′E

- Village
- Interactive map of Haimre
- Country: Estonia
- County: Rapla County
- Parish: Märjamaa Parish
- Time zone: UTC+2 (EET)
  - Summer (DST): UTC+3 (EEST)

Haimre is a village in Märjamaa Parish, Rapla County in western Estonia.

The manor in Haimre was owned by Alexander Rudolf Karl von Uexküll of the Uexküll family.
