= International Movement of Donbass =

Anti-Ukrainian political movement in the Soviet Union

International Movement of Donbass Интернациональное движение Донбасса Інтернаціональний рух Донбасу
- Abbreviation: IDD or IRD
- Leader: Sergey Chepik (last)
- Founders: Dmitry Kornilov, Vladimir Kornilov
- Founded: 18 November 1990
- Dissolved: 2003
- Succeeded by: Donetsk Republic
- Headquarters: Donetsk, Ukraine
- Youth wing: Youth League of Intermovement of Donbass
- Ideology: Anti-Ukrainization; Soviet nationalism Russophilia; Federalism; Donbass regionalism Donbass separatism
- Colours: Red; Azure; Black

Party flag

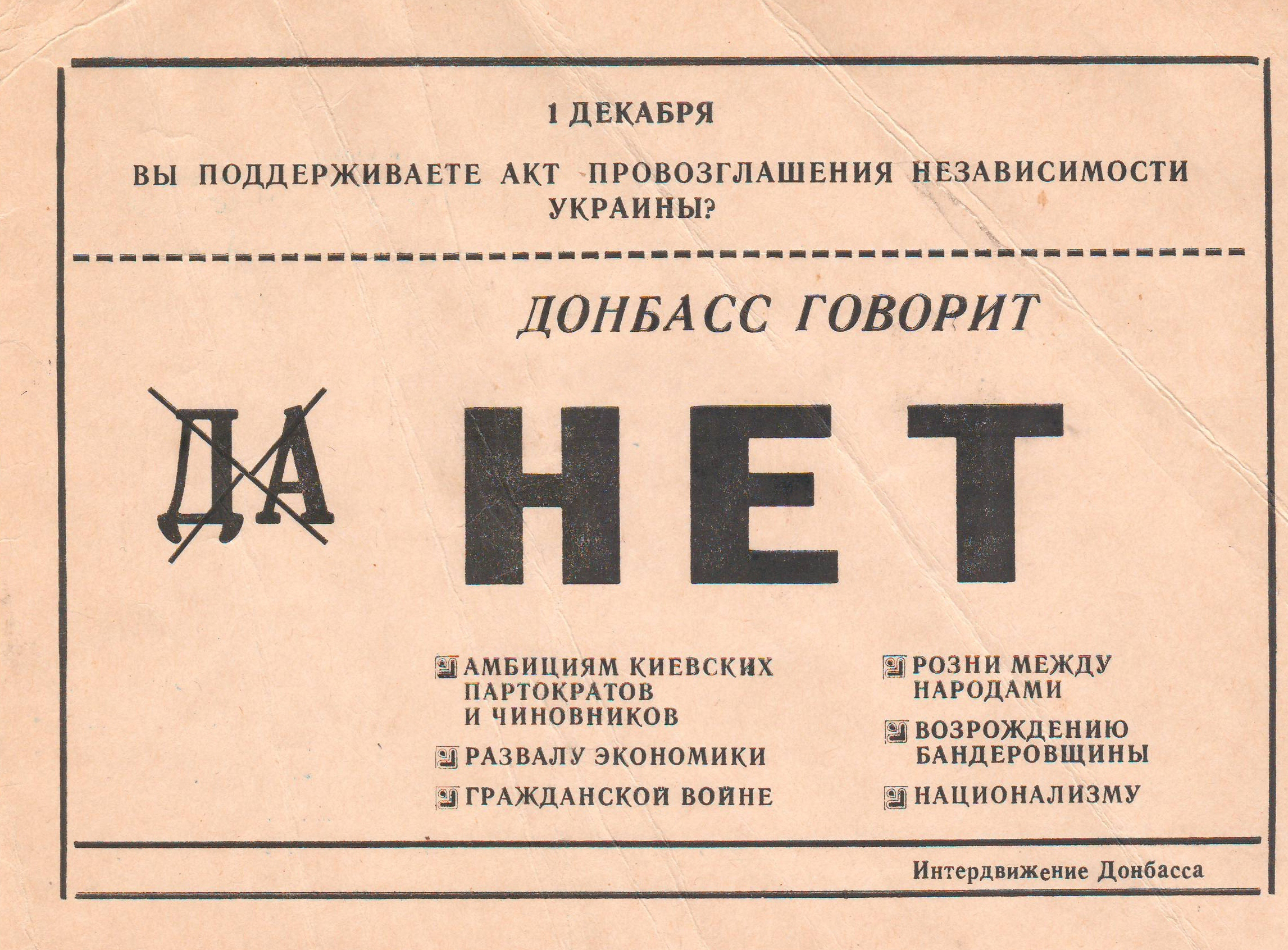
An Interfront leaflet opposing the declaration of independence of Ukraine from the USSR

The International Movement of Donbass (Note: Russian: Интернациональное движение Донбасса, romanized: Internatsional'noye dvizheniye Donbassa IDD; Ukrainian: Інтернаціональний рух Донбасу, romanized: Internatsionalʹnyy rukh Donbasu, IRD), also known as the Interfront of the Donbass (Note: Russian: Интерфронт Донбасса; Ukrainian: Інтерфронт Донбасу), sometimes shortened to the Intermovement (Note: Russian: Интердвижение; Ukrainian: Інтеррух) was a political movement in the late Ukrainian SSR and the first decade of independent Ukraine. It was founded in 1990 by the members of the intelligentsia in the Donbas region in Eastern Ukraine. It was founded in opposition to the People's Movement of Ukraine, which favored Ukrainian independence from the Soviet Union. Similar Interfront pro-Soviet movements existed in the Latvian SSR, Moldovan SSR and other republics.

In 1992, it grew stronger as miners and local elites opposed the perceived economic mismanagement of the central government in Kyiv and alleged Ukrainization. In 1993, the Interfront participated in a rally in Donetsk against the economic policy of Leonid Kravchuk. The rally was co-sponsored by the Socialist Party of Ukraine.

In a publication from 1993, the Interfront emphasized the multinational character of the Donbas.

(The) Donbass has since the old times served as home to dozens of peoples. The territory of what is now the Donbass has been part of the Khazar Khanate, Golden Horde, the Crimean Khanate, the Russian Empire, the Donetsk-Krivoy Rog Soviet Republic and (finally) the Ukrainian State... the Donbass is the centre [of] a unique multinational culture.

— Programm of the Intermovement of the Donbass (Projekt), in: Nash Donbass, No. 1 (January 1993), p. 4.

In 1993 and 1994, the chairman of the Intermovement was Dmitriy Kornilov.

In 1993, members of the Interfront participated in the foundation of the Civil Congress of Ukraine. Kornilov became the ideological leader of the Civic Congress. The Congress turned into the Slavic Party in 1998.

In 1997, Kornilov said that Donetsk is "beyond doubt" Russian. Two years later, he repeated that the Donetsk region "orients itself towards Moscow".

Dmitriy Kornilov died in 2002. His brother, Vladimir Kornilov continued his work and later became a citizen of the Donetsk People's Republic. Some observers see the small Donetsk Republic political party as the successor movement to the Interfront of the Donbas.

The flag of the Donetsk People's Republic is claimed by the separatist authorities to be based on the flag of the Donetsk–Krivoy Rog Soviet Republic, whom they consider the "People's Republic's" predecessor. However, there is no evidence of any such flag in 1918, and it is most likely based on the flag of the Interfront.

== See also ==
- International Front of the Working People of Latvia
- Unity Movement for Equality in Rights

== Literature ==
- Andrew Wilson: The Donbas between Ukraine and Russia: The Use of History in Political Disputes, in: Journal of Contemporary History, Vol. 30 (1995), No. 2, pp. 265–289.
