= Yedinstvo (Lithuania) =

Pro-Soviet movement during the perestroika

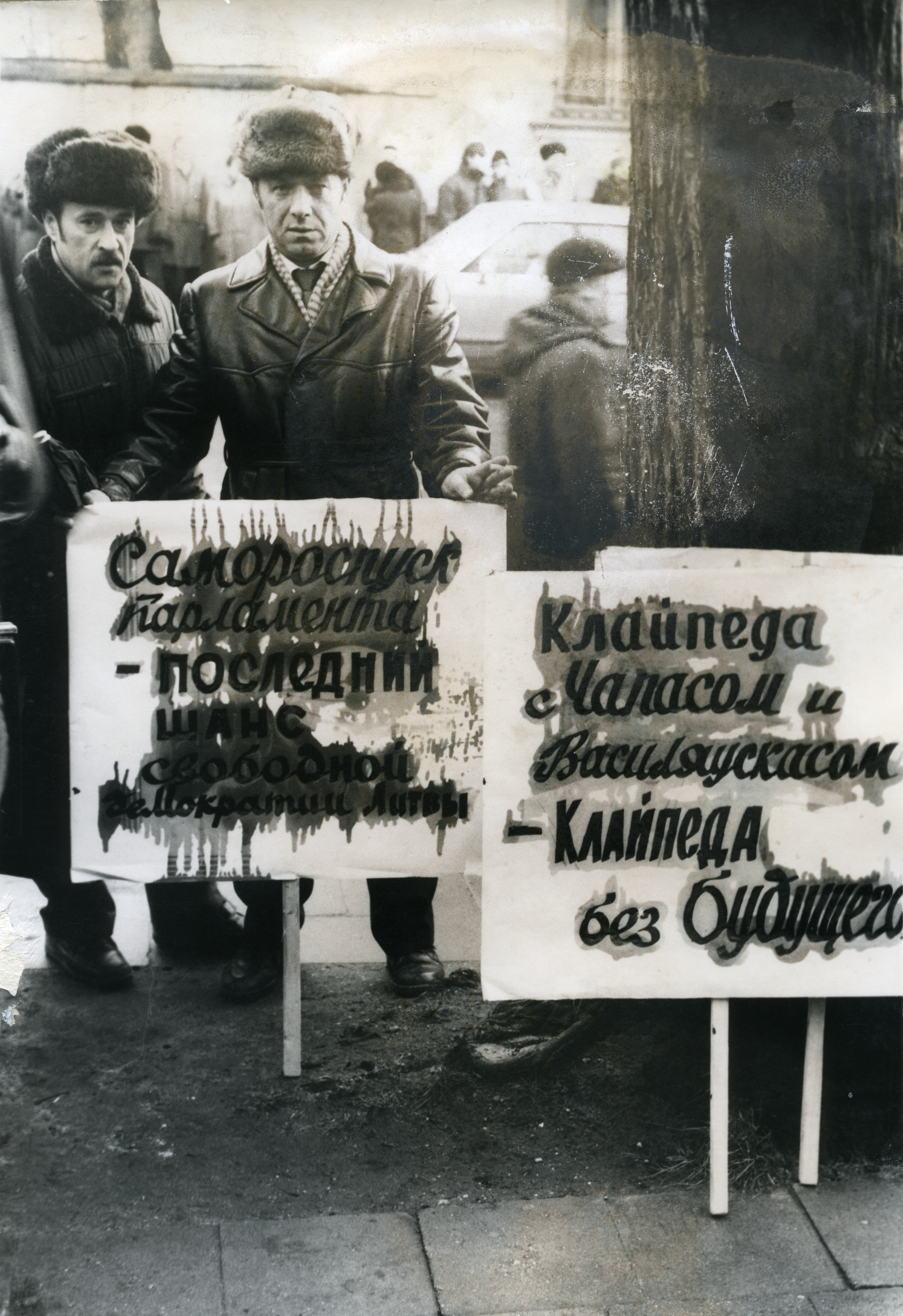
Meeting of Yedinstvo in Klaipėda

Yedinstvo (literally: Unity, Russian: Единство, Lithuanian: Vienybė, Polish: Jedność) was a pro-Soviet and anti-Sąjūdis movement in the Lithuanian SSR during the Perestroika era. The goals of the movement were similar to those of the Latvian and Estonian Internationalist Movements, e.g. opposition to disintegration of the Soviet Union. Yedinstvo was supported by the Soviet military and the KGB.

In addition to ethnic Russians, the organization had some success among the Polish minority in Lithuania, some of whom preferred Lithuania as a member of the Soviet Union. Yedinstvo went as far as to support forming a Polish autonomous region in southeastern Lithuania. Some commentators suggested that the organization was more popular with the Polish minority than the Russophone minority of Lithuania, which might have surprised the Poles of Warsaw, then seeking a de-communization in Poland. At the election to the Soviet Congress of People's Deputies, two Poles were elected to that body.

The movement lost influence after the August Coup, which its leaders had supported. Since 1991, the organization is inactive.

== See also ==
- Intermovement
- International Front of the Working People of Latvia
- Soyuz
