= Intermovement =

Political movement and organisation in the Estonian SSR

The Intermovement (formally International Movement of Workers in the Estonian Soviet Socialist Republic) (Estonian: Interliikumine, Russian: Интердвижение, romanized: Interdvizhenie) was a political movement and organisation in the Estonian SSR. It was founded on 19 July 1988 and claimed by different sources 16,000 - 100,000 members. The original name of the movement was Interfront (International Front of Workers in the Estonian Soviet Socialist Republic), which was changed to Intermovement in autumn 1988.

The movement was aligned with the pro-Soviet wing of the Estonian Communist Party, and opposed the Estonian independence movement led by the pro-independence Popular Front of Estonia and the liberal wing of the CPE. The Intermovement was not an organisation built on nationalist principles, as it gathered almost exclusively supporters from ethnic non-Estonians. The main leader of the movement was Jevgeni Kogan (Russian: Евгений Коган, sometimes transliterated as Evgeny Kogan). Kogan was also one of the leaders of the hardline Soyuz faction in the USSR legislature. Other leaders of the Intermovement included Vladimir Jarovoi (Russian: Владимир Яровой, also transliterated as Vladimir Yarovoi), Arnold Sai, Vladimir Lebedev (Russian: Владимир Лебедев) and economist Konstantin Kiknadze

The Intermovement functioned at factories, mainly, at military plants and those factories that had an all-union importance. A large part of Estonian heavy industry was part of the integrated production chain providing their production to the industries in other Soviet regions. These included e.g. the engine factory Dvigatel, Kalinin's and Pöögelmann's electrotechnical plant Tondi Elektroonika, and the (especially but not only phosphorite) mining industry in Northern Estonia. It was feared that Estonian independence would lead to the loss of jobs. In fact, after independence the industries were forced to restructure their production and re-orient to new markets, which in most of cases drastically reduced production and forced lay off many people, a large number of whom were Soviet-era immigrants.

According to critics, the movement's aim was to protect the conservative Soviet values and make everything possible to block the actions of the Popular Front. According to the former KGB general Oleg Kalugin (Russian: Олег Калугин) it was established in Estonia as also in other parts of the USSR on the initiative of the KGB, as a counterbalance to the Popular Fronts, perceived as nationalist organizations. Despite the stereotyping of the Russophones as an elitist force opposing an Estonian independence movement, the Interfront organizations were mass movements and their membership was made up of people from all walks of life. One of initiators of foundation of the Popular Front R. Grigorjan afterwards gave the following evaluation:

One cannot say that everything in the ideas and slogans of the Intermovementians was wrong. Their concerns that Estonian language will be introduced and people will be fired for not speaking it, fulfilled completely. Or, that the Russian-speakers will be deprived of political rights (citizenship) and turn into second-class people, that Russian schools will be closed etc. But, if the leaders of the Intermovement cared really about human rights, one could find common language with them. However, what they thought about weren't people. For them, as well as for the radical nationalists, people were means, not aim. They'd cared about destiny of the CPSU, Soviet Empire, red flag, marxism-leninism etc.

In elections for the Congress of People's Deputies of the Soviet Union in 1989 pro-Intermovement candidates won 6 seats out of Estonia's 36, against 27 won by the Popular Front.

From 29 August 1990 to 21 August 1991 the Intermovement ran the radio station Nadezhda (Russian: Надежда, meaning 'Hope'), which contrary to the ordinary procedure got its license from the central authorities of the Soviet Union without informing local authorities in Estonia. Following an order by the Soviet Defense Minister Dmitry Yazov, the radio station was installed at the territory of the Soviet military base in Keila, near Tallinn.

In 1993 Estonian state adopted a law on citizenship and residency, based on Jus sanguinis. Under the new law, former Soviet citizens who had neither held Estonian citizenship nor were descended from citizens (including approximately 500,000 ethnic Russians) were to be regarded foreigners. Some raised concerns that the new foreigners would face possible expulsion from Estonian territory; however, these concerns were not based in fact and in general, Soviet-era non-citizen immigrants were furnished with long-term residence permits.

Ostensibly in response to the government's actions, Juri Mišin and a few other former activists of the Intermovement made demands of regional autonomy for Estonia's Russian minority, seeking autonomy of the ethnic Russian dominated areas in North-East Estonia.

Activists held an unconstitutional plebiscite on this matter in the Narva region. Some raised concerns that the central government might use force to prevent the plebiscite, but these concerns were not based in fact, and it tookplace on July 16–July 17, 1993. According to the activist commissions in Narva and Sillamäe, 53.2% percent of voters participated and 98% in total (97.2% in Narva). However, the central government determined the majority of the population did not participate, and demanded the Narva city council, which had provided material support to separatists, to disband.

The Intermovement was not built on ethnic principles and had some ethnic Estonian supporters. However, of the 742 delegates attending the first congress on March 5, 1989, only 11 were ethnic Estonian. It was supported by Gustav Naan and Vladimir Hütt; Intermovements ranks also included Arnold Sai, Lembit Annus and Valter Toots. Similar organisations existed in Latvia, Lithuania (called 'Yedinstvo' - 'Unity') and Moldova. They shared orthodox communist views and struggled for preserving the Soviet Union. Being committed to the USSR's territorial integrity, they forged alliances with Russian nationalist organizations. Pyotr Rozhok, a participant of the Intermovement, became a LDPRF politician in 1990s before running as Stalinist Bloc candidate in the Russian legislative election in 1999.

On 15 May 1990, the Intermovement had a mass gathering in front of the Toompea Castle, that escalated into an attempt to take over the parliament building. Edgar Savisaar made a radio announcement "Toompea is under attack". Thousands of Estonians responded and forced the unarmed anti-independence protesters to disperse within few hours. Images of Intermovement leaving Toompea by Jaan Künnap:

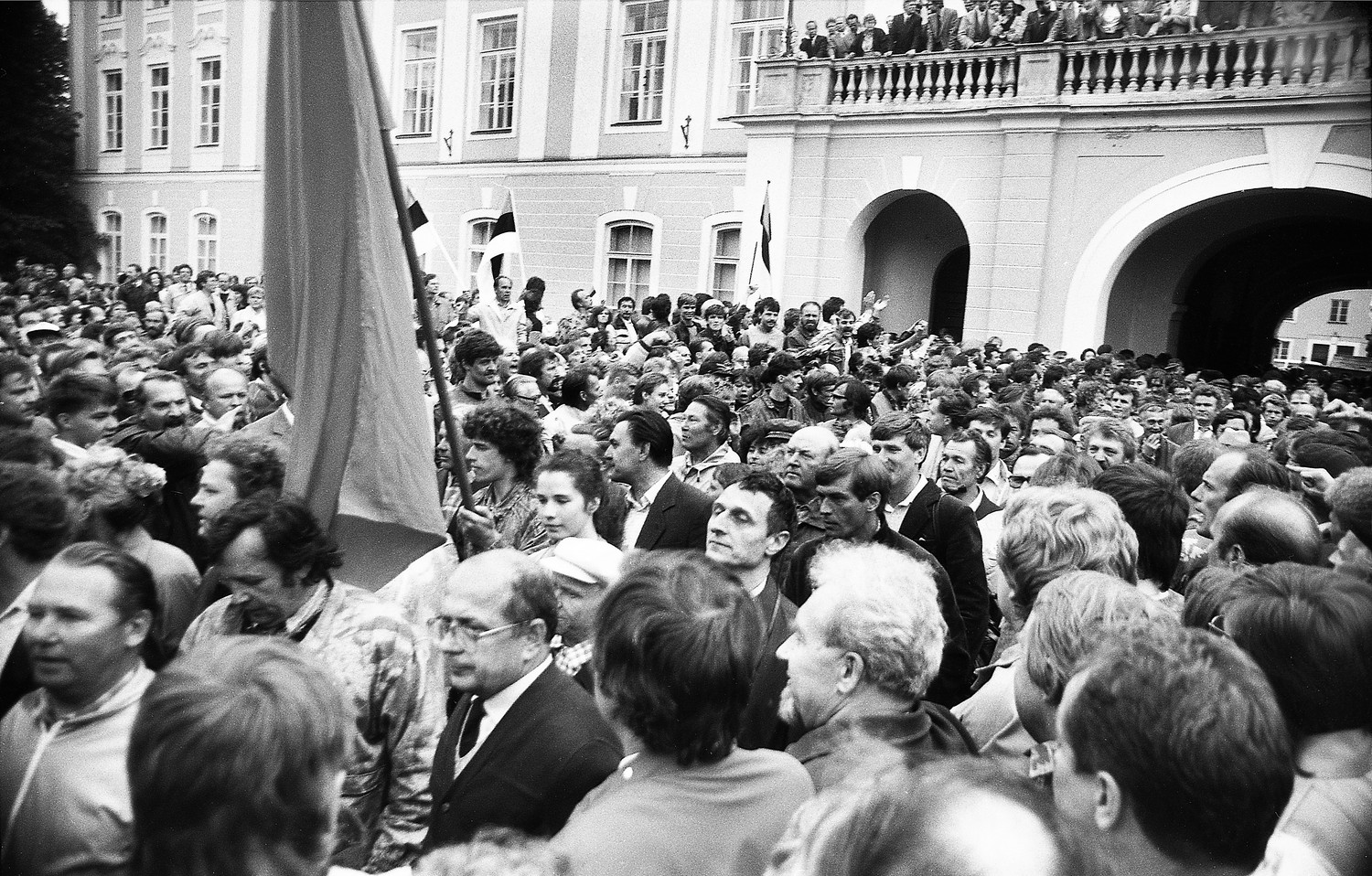

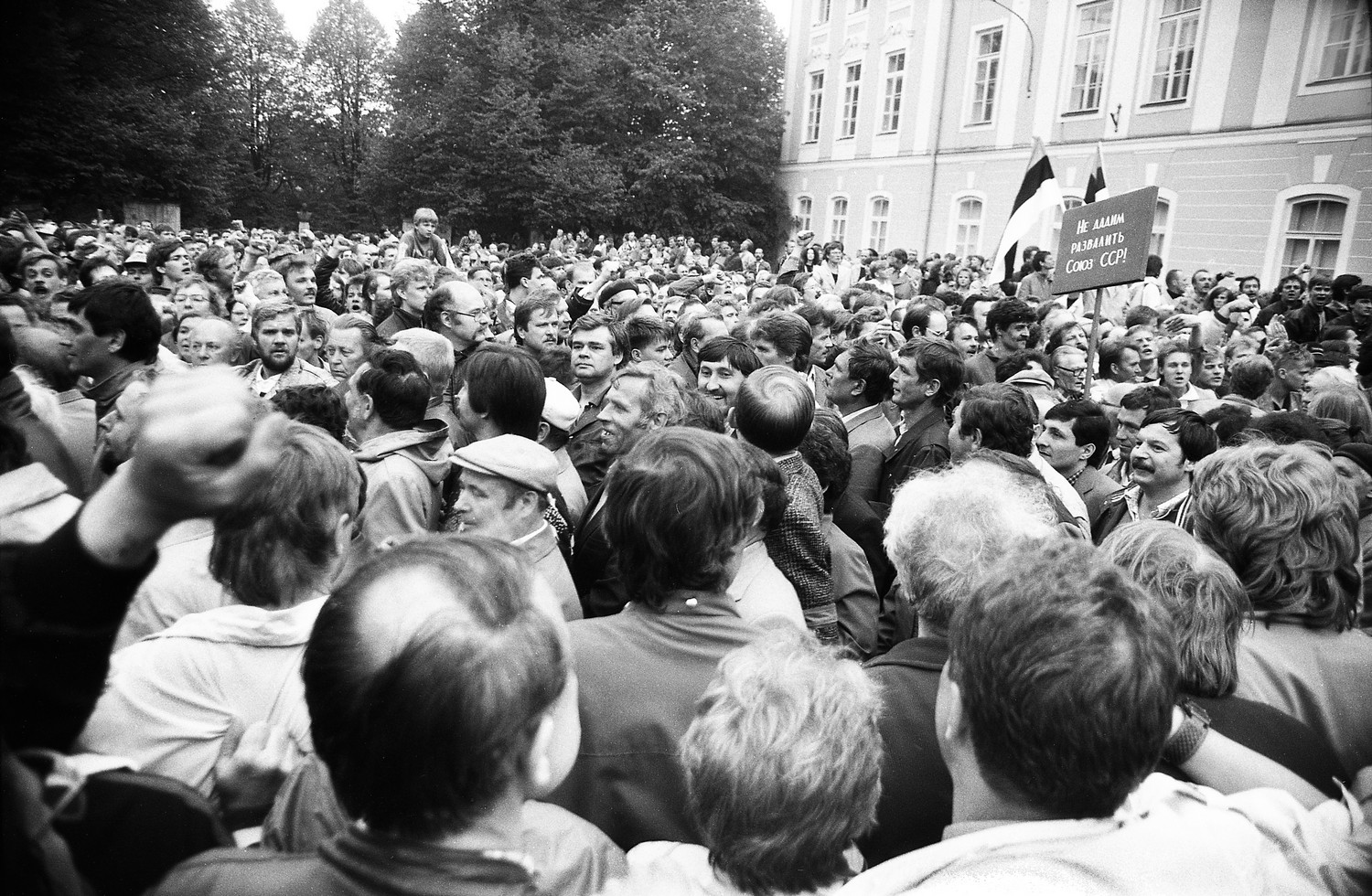

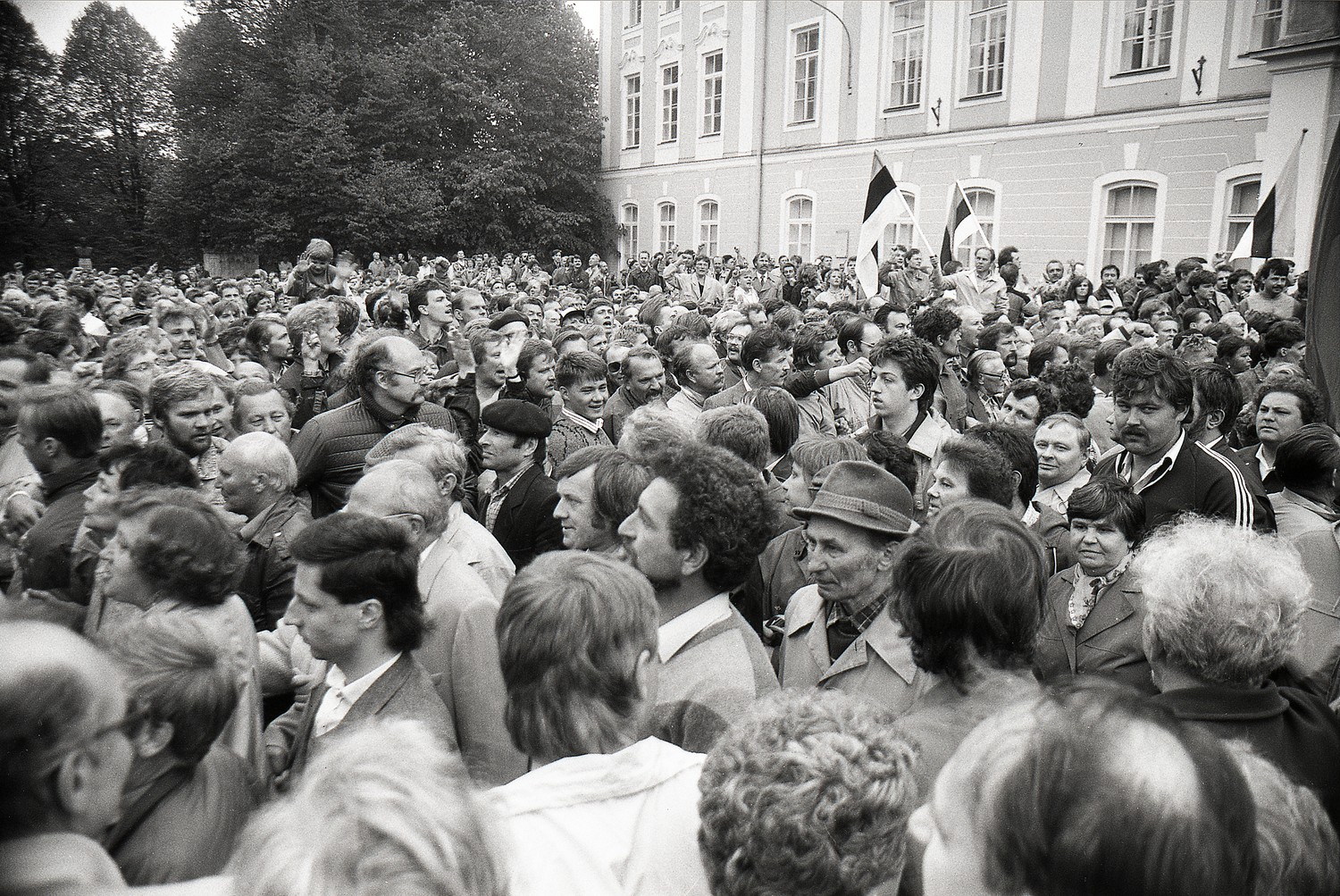

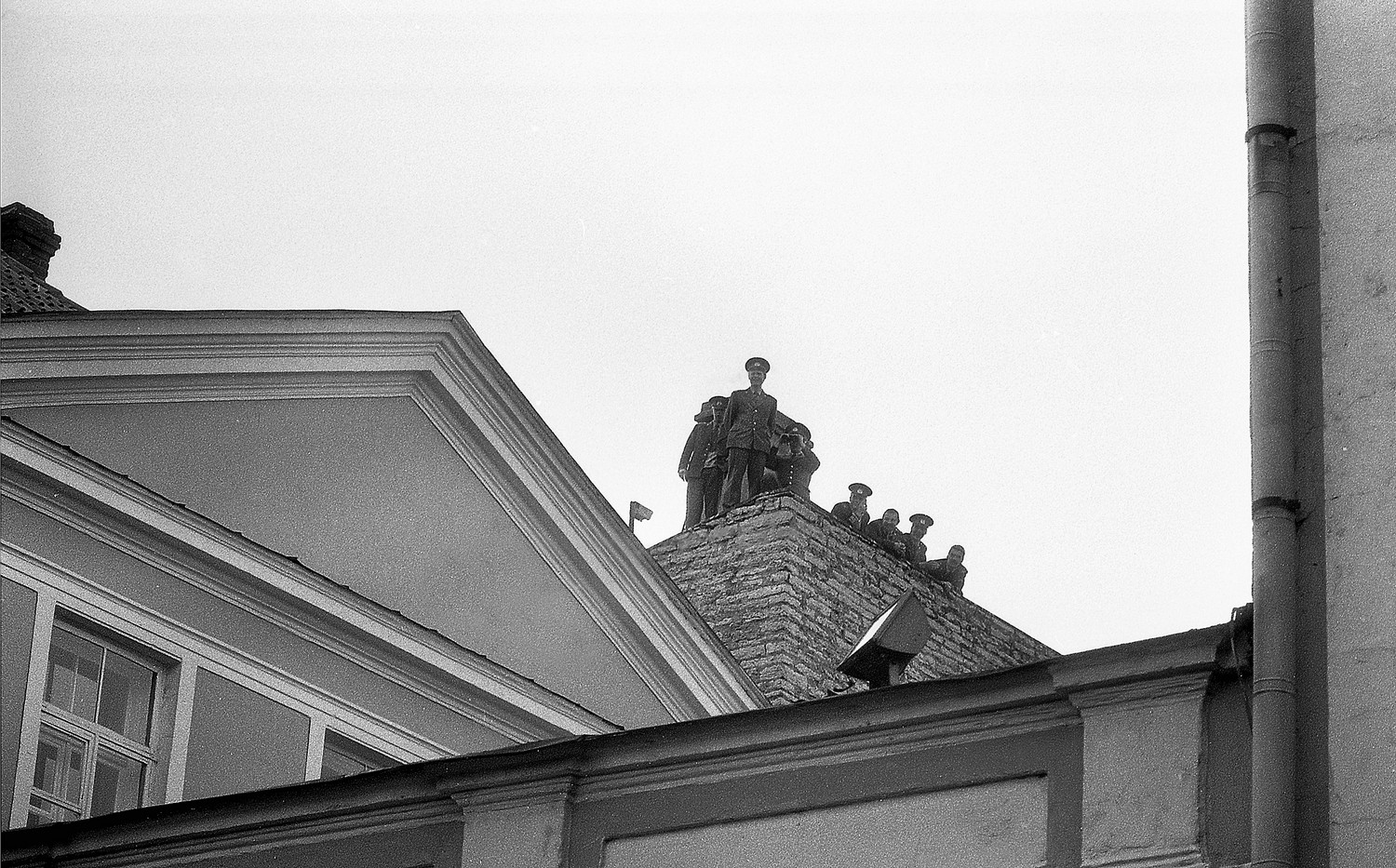

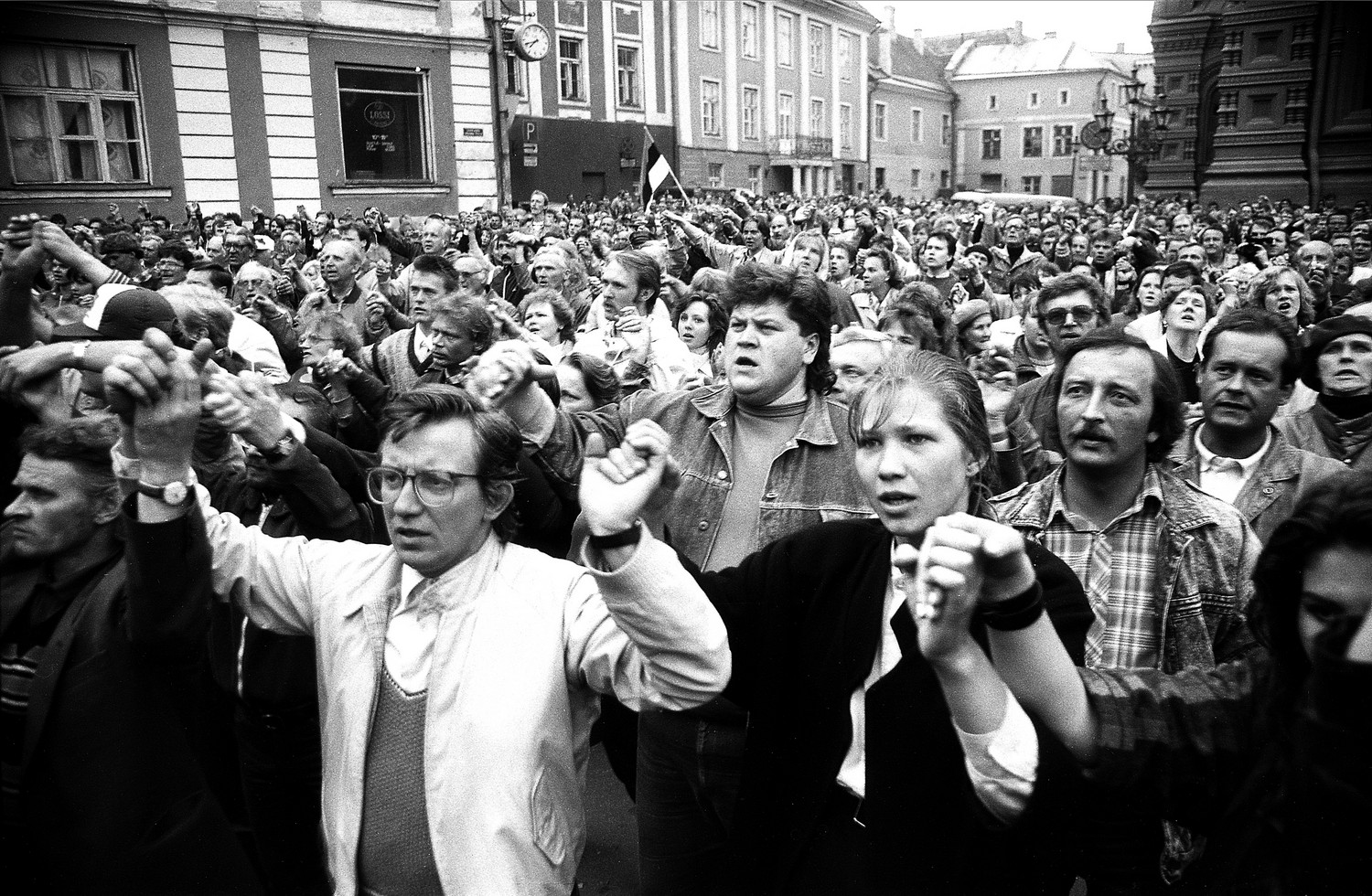

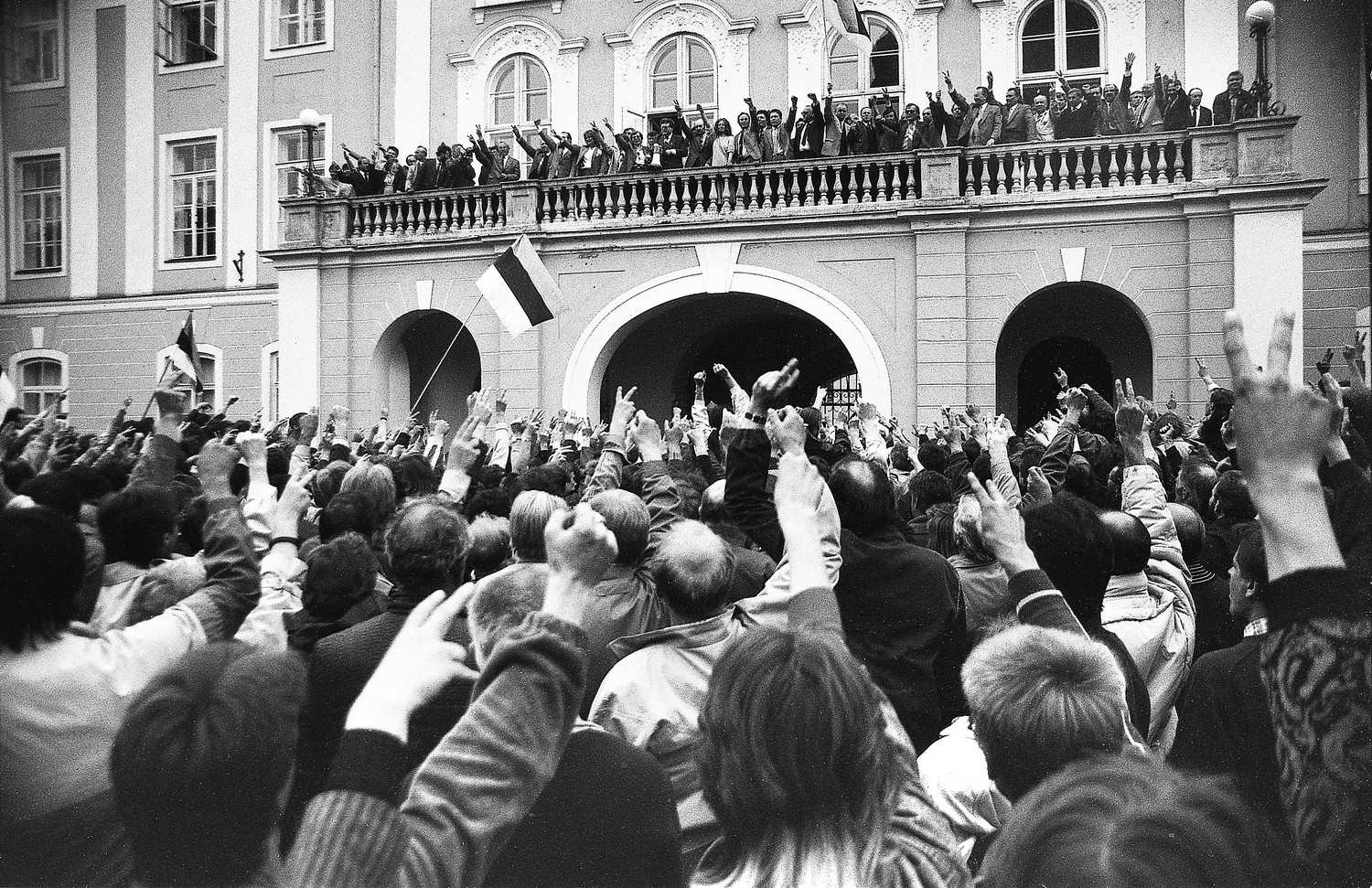

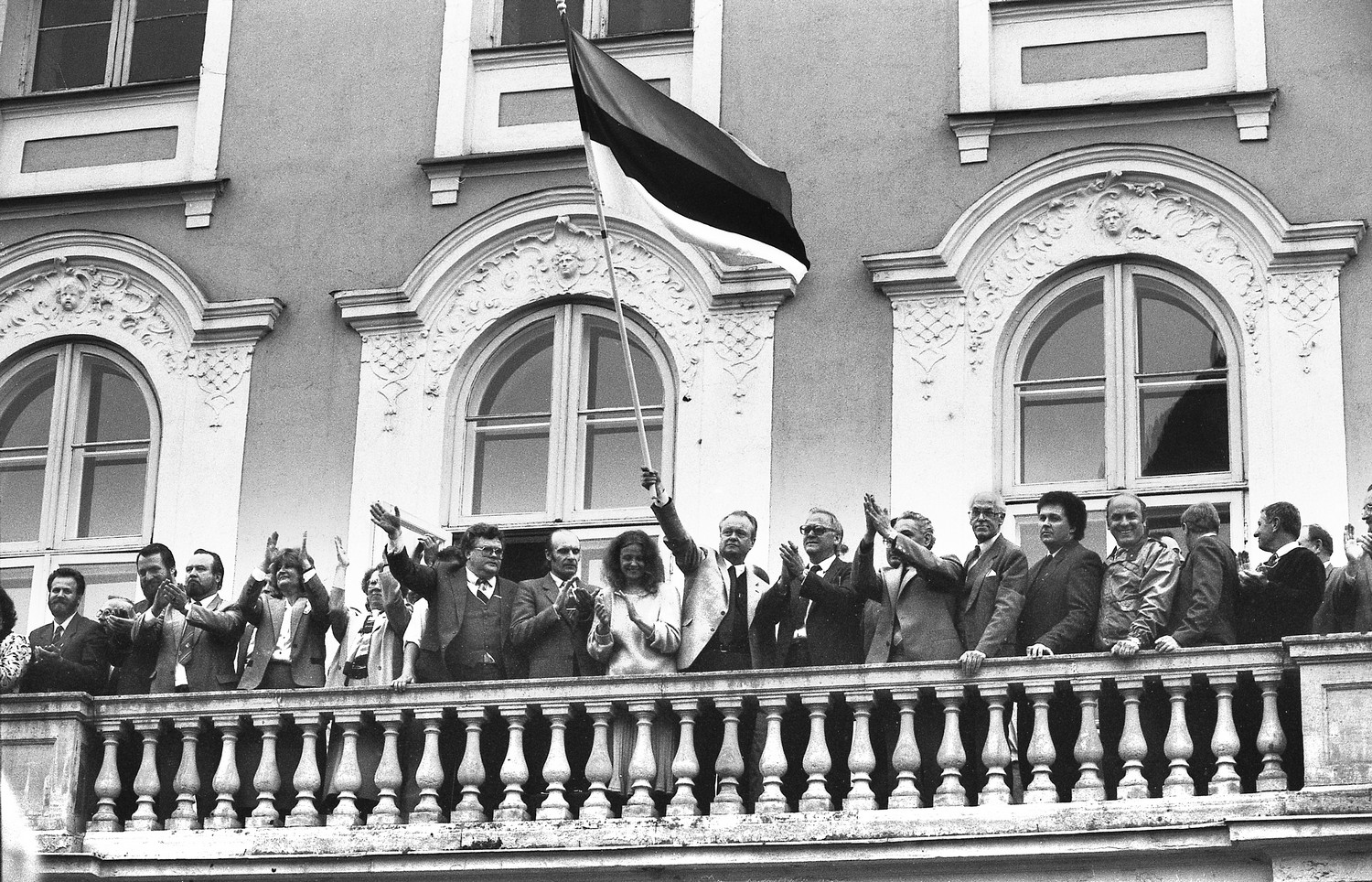

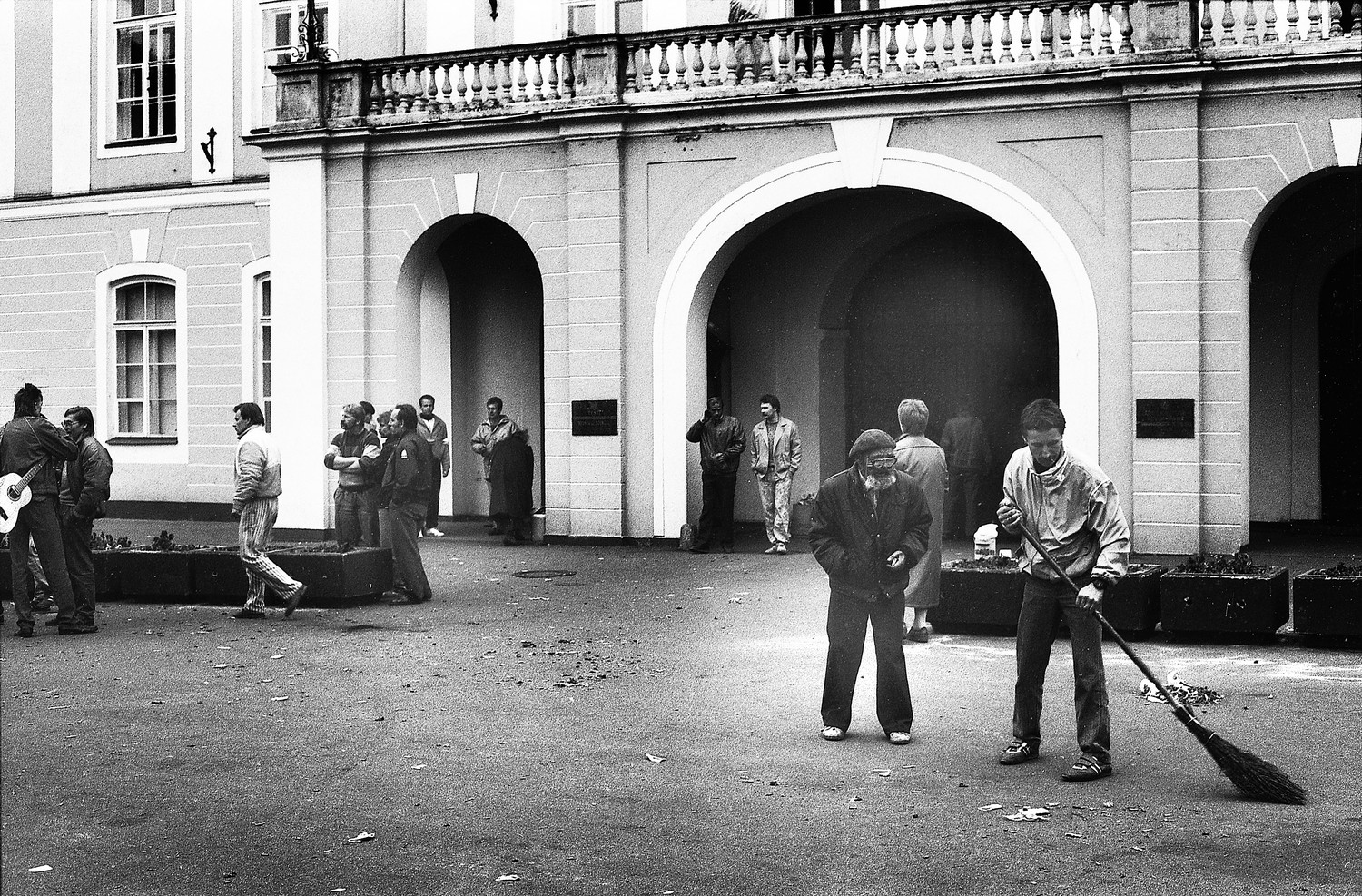

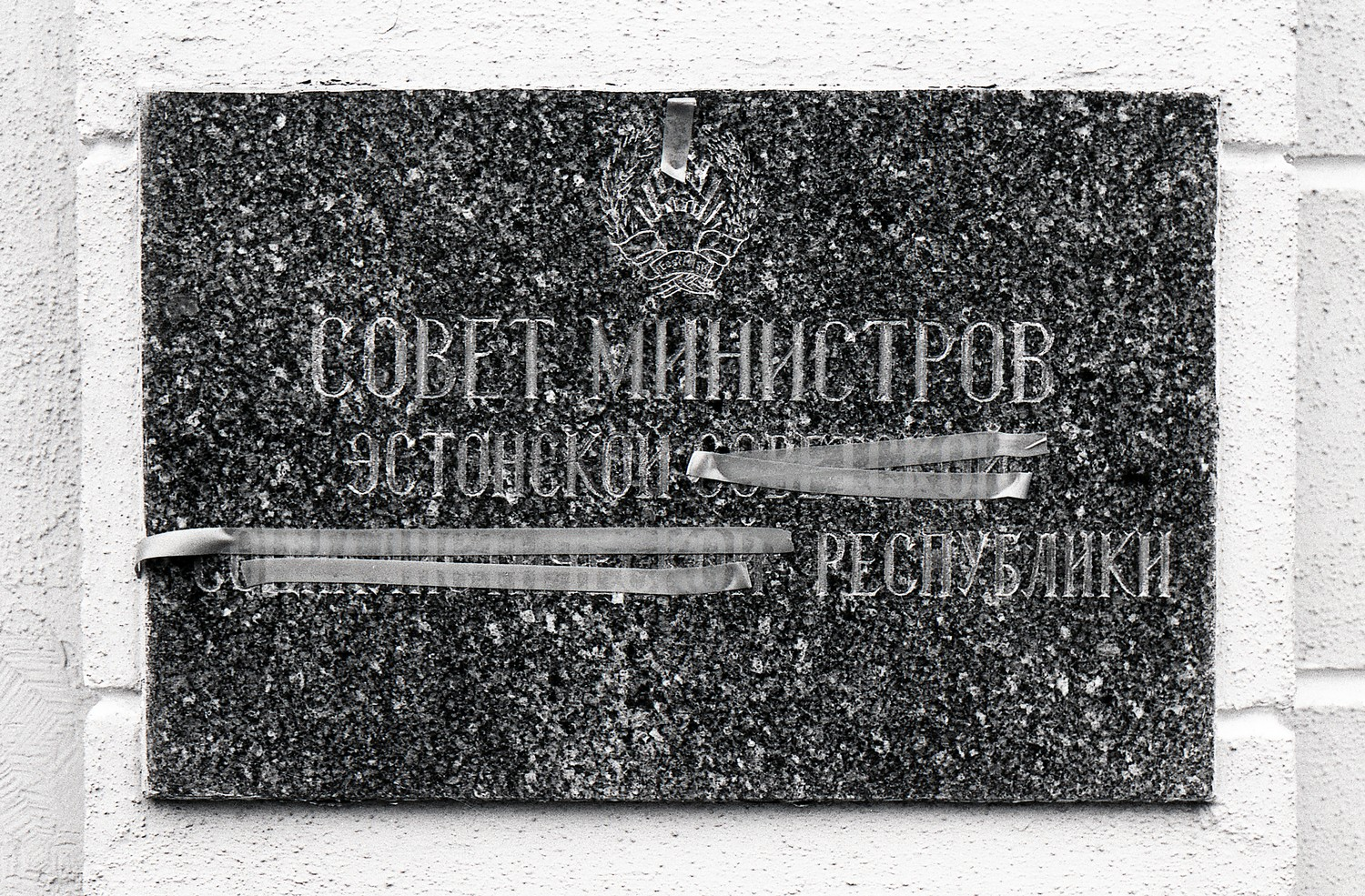

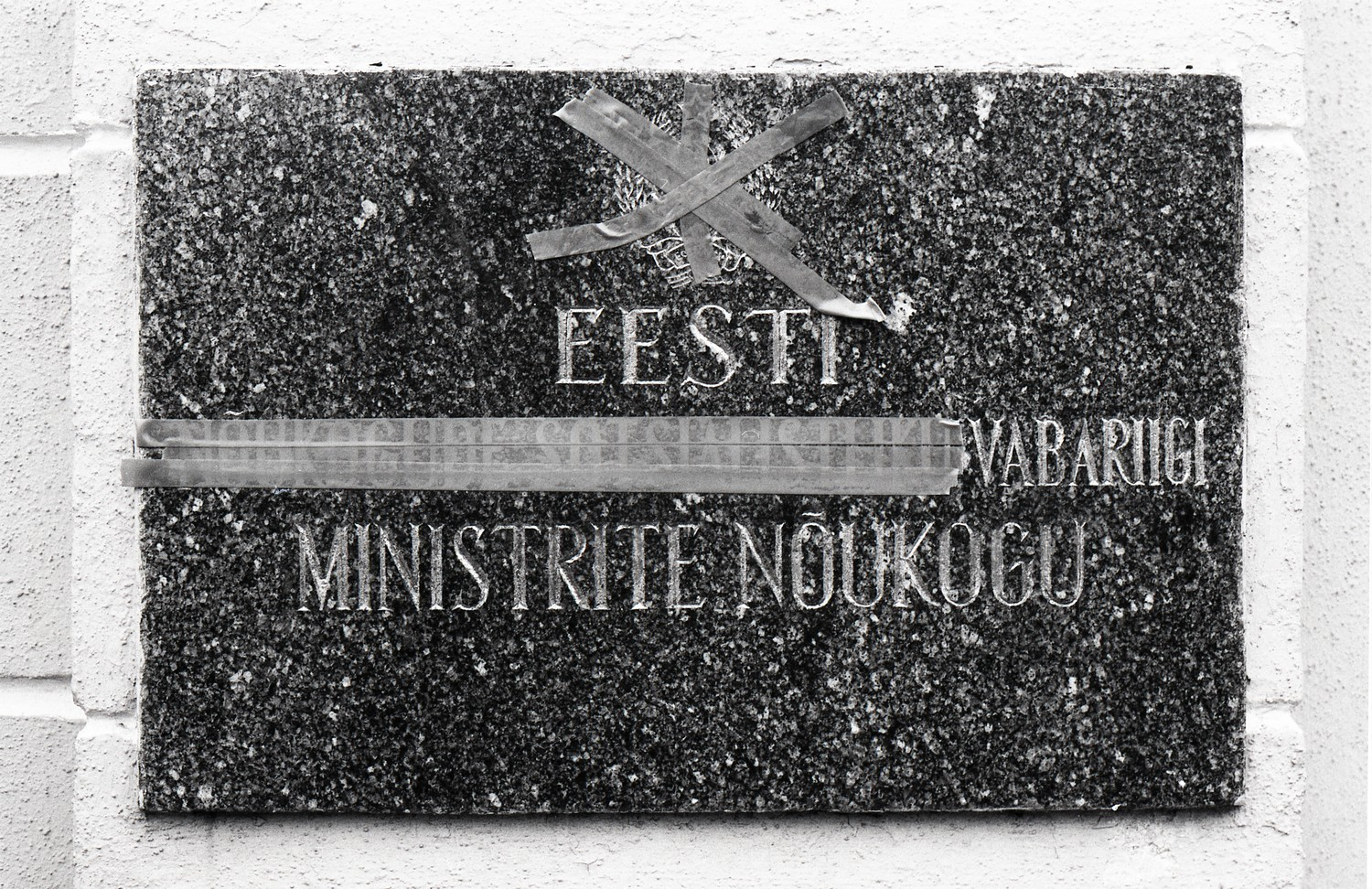

== See also ==
- International Front of the Working People of Latvia
- Yedinstvo (Lithuanian counterpart)
- Soyuz
