= Civic Party of Moldova =

Political party in Moldova

- Leader: Vladimir Solonari
- Founder: Vladimir Solonari
- Founded: 1997
- Dissolved: 1999
- Split from: Unity Movement for Equality in Rights
- Merged into: Movement for a Democratic and Prosperous Moldova
- Ideology: Centrism
- Political position: Center

The Civic Party of Moldova (Romanian: Partidul Civic din Moldova, PCM) was a political party in Moldova led by Vladimir Solonari.

== History ==
The party joined the For a Democratic and Prosperous Moldova alliance to contest the 1998 elections. The alliance received 18% of the vote, winning 24 of the 101 seats and becoming the third-largest faction in Parliament. It formed the Alliance for Democracy and Reforms coalition together with Democratic Convention of Moldova and the Party of Democratic Forces, which was able to form a government led by Ion Ciubuc.

The alliance was dissolved prior to the 2001 elections.
