= Gustav Naan =

Estonian philosopher and physicist

Gustav Naan (17 May 1919 near Vladivostok – 12 January 1994 in Tallinn) was a Soviet and Estonian physicist and philosopher. According to the Estonian Encyclopedia's definition, he "wrote plenty of irritating publicist articles".

== Personal life ==
Gustav Naan was born in Russian SFSR in a village near Vladivostok to a family of Estonian settlers. He graduated from the Leningrad State University in 1941. He took part in World War II and joined the CPSU in 1943. Having settled to Estonia after the USSR annexed Estonia, Gustav Naan, a loyal communist and graduate of the Higher Party School of the AUCP(b) (1946) published a number of Stalinist-oriented polemic pieces (treating Estonian history and politics from the pro-Soviet perspective, e.g. "Eesti kodanlike natsionalistide ideoloogia reaktsiooniline olemus″ ('The Reactionary Essence of the Ideology of Estonian Bourgeois Nationalists'), 1947). In 1948, Naan published an article in Voprosy filosofii on the philosophical implications of the theory of relativity, criticizing 'physical idealists' of the US and Britain; in 1951, however, he published an article that decried vulgar materialist critics of the relativity theory whilst being ″tolerant on philosophic questions to a striking degree in Stalinist Russia, considering its place and time of publication″. Authors who followed Naan's article into discussion were almost universally critical of Naan's position. In 1952, which was the most intense year of the debate, three different authors published against Naan in the 1952 first issue of Voprosy filosofii alone.

Naan was the director of the Institute of History of the Academy of Sciences of the Estonian SSR (1950–1951), Vice-President of the Academy of Sciences of the Estonian SSR (1951–1964). From 1964, Naan worked at the Institute of Astrophysics and Atmosphere Physics of the Academy of Sciences of the Estonian SSR. Having turned to theorizing on cosmology, cybernetics and demography, he often rejected taboos of both the 'traditional' world-view and orthodox communist opinions on such matters. He often juxtaposed what he saw as a science-based world-view with a trivial thinking (Estonian: "argimõtlemine"), which he saw both among common people, the intelligentsia as well as the ruling classes. He later claimed to have been one of the promoters of the theory of relativity, at the time this was still considered pseudoscience by the Soviet authorities. The influential 1968 article "Võim ja vaim" (roughly "The Power and the Mind") was widely read among the liberal intelligentsia, who interpreted it as a critique of the administrative/bureaucratic socialism and command economy. His articles such as this enjoyed popularity in Russia, too. In the 1960s and 1970s he often held lectures either in the assembly hall of the Tallinn Polytechnical Institute or (as initiated on his own initiative) in Tõravere as seminars of philosophy, often balancing between the permissible by the authorities and impermissible.

He also proposed the Symmetric Universe hypothesis, according to which, side by side with the ordinary world, there is an anti-world. His ideas have been characterized as "viewpoints that have been recognized as valuable from the scientific point of view".

Naan was editor-in-chief of Estonian Soviet Encyclopedia, the first edition of which started in the late 1960s. The encyclopedia was highly successful in Estonia.

In terms of political affiliations, Naan remained a staunch supporter of the Soviet system (initially an enthusiastic supporter of Perestroika though) and was a devout opponent of Estonia's pro-independence movement; Naan supported the (pro-Moscow) Internationalist Movement. Having gained much public support in the 1970s for his relatively bold opinion pieces on topics like family, the rising divorce rate (that he argued was more or less a normal development), morals and sex (the importance of which, he argued, was being downplayed out of pseudomoralistic argumentation), he soon became a despised figure for his anti-independence stance, which was reflected in his newspaper articles of the time (e.g. his article «С ног на голову» ('From (standing on) Feet to (standing on) Head', Estonian title "Kõik pea peale″), condemning the Estonian Sovereignty Declaration passed by the Supreme Soviet of the Estonian SSR, was published in Pravda, 23 November 1988.). He also published a number of articles where he either tried to downplay or rationalize Stalinist repressions. His stance almost led to his expulsion from the Academy of Sciences.

== Opinions on him ==
- Academician Jaan Einasto: "Naan had no illusions as to the Soviet reality."
- Academician Erast Parmasto: "Gustav Naan was a man with a sharp mind and one with an even sharper tongue, a "self-made man", who had preferred to the party functionary's career a much calmer and congenial life of a scientist."
- Academician Hans Trass: "How terrible, that a man, who could inspiringly write about the predominance of the mind over the power developed into a justificator of the reign of terror. Such a person is an example of a broken, deformed mentality, that was shaped by the Stalinist antihumanism and obedience to fear."
- Literary critic Vaapo Vaher: "Naan could be treated as a Soviet dandy, a Soviet Dorian Gray. ... During his days of glory the academician had on the local intellectual society an impression of some exotic creature ... Dorian Gray and his creator Oscar Wilde can be treated as marthyrs of esthetism, Naan was destroyed by the evil of dogmaticism. Add to this [his] personal vanity. His story could be treated as the occurrence of the good and the vice in the human being, it can be seen against the background of the mystery of Dr. Jekyll and Mr. Hyde."

== Bibliography ==
- "Dependence and opposition. Problems in Soviet Estonian historiography in the late 1940s and early 1950s" by Hain Rebas. In: Journal of Baltic Studies, Volume 36, Issue 4 Winter 2005, pages 423 – 448
- "Philosophy of science in Estonia" by Rein Vihalemm and Peeter Müürsepp. In: Journal for General Philosophy of Science, Volume 38, Number 1 / April, 2007, pp. 167–191.

== See also ==
- Vladimir Hütt
