= Viktor Alksnis =

Latvian-Russian politician and military officer (1950–2025)

- Виктор Алкснис
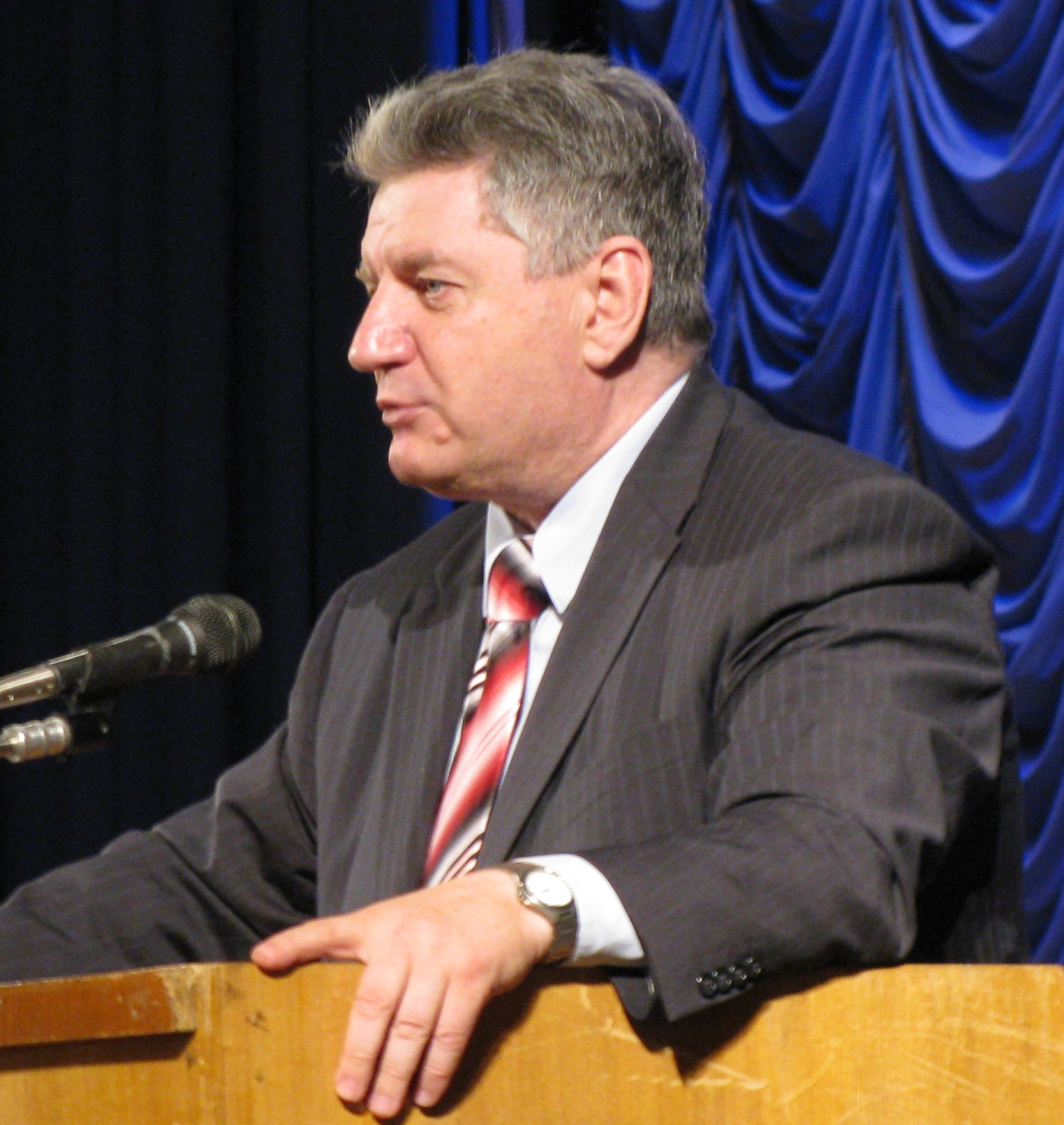
- Alksnis in 2008

Mayor of Tuchkovo
- In office 18 September 2013 – 4 February 2015
- Preceded by: Efendi Haidakov (acting)
- Succeeded by: Zhanna Kiselyova

Member of the State Duma
- In office 26 March 2000 – 24 December 2007

Member of the Supreme Soviet of the Latvian SSR
- In office 3 May 1990 – 2 October 1991

People's Deputy of the Soviet Union
- In office 21 May 1989 – 5 September 1991

Personal details
- Born: 21 June 1950 Tashtagol, Kemerovo Oblast, Russian SFSR, USSR
- Died: 1 January 2025 (aged 74)
- Citizenship: Russian
- Party: CPSU (1974–1991); ROS (1991–2000); A Just Russia (2016)
- Other political affiliations: Interfront of Latvia (1988–1989); Inter-regional Deputies Group (1989); Soyuz (1989–1991); National Salvation Front (1992–1993); Club of Angry Patriots (2023–2025)

Viktor Imantovich Alksnis (Russian: Виктор Имантович Алкснис, Latvian: Viktors Alksnis; 21 June 1950 – 1 January 2025) was a Russian politician and Soviet Air Force colonel of Latvian descent. He was the chairman of the Russian Center of Free Technologies, an organization intended to promote Free Software and open standards in Russia. He was a member of the USSR Supreme Soviet, a member of the Russian All-People's Union and also represented the Rodina (Motherland-National Patriotic Union) party in the Russian State Duma. From 2003 to 2007, he represented the People's Union party in the Fourth Duma. From 2013 to 2015, Alksnis was the mayor of the city of Tuchkovo in the Moscow Oblast.

Due to his political views and personal style, Alksnis was nicknamed "the Black Colonel", an allusion to the Soviet term "Black Colonels" (Russian: Чёрные полковники) for the Greek military junta of 1967–1974.

== Family history ==
In the 1930s, Alksnis's grandfather, Yakov Alksnis (Latvian: Jēkabs Alksnis) was the head of the Soviet Air Force. He also took part in the military tribunal for the Case of Trotskyist Anti-Soviet Military Organization, which sentenced Mikhail Tukhachevsky and other high-ranking Soviet officers to death on Joseph Stalin's order. However, only eight months later, Yakov Alksnis was also arrested and executed.

During the destalinization period of the late 1950's, Yakov Alksnis was posthumously rehabilitated; the Air Forces college in Riga was named in his honour. Despite these Stalin-era persecutions of his family members, Viktor Alksnis became a staunch supporter of the Soviet political system.

In 1973 Alksnis graduated from the Riga Higher Military Aviation Engineering School named for his grandfather as a qualified military radio engineer.

Alksnis's Latvian heritage was the subject of slander allegations in 2007 involving comments on the Internet.

== Attitude to the breakup of the USSR ==
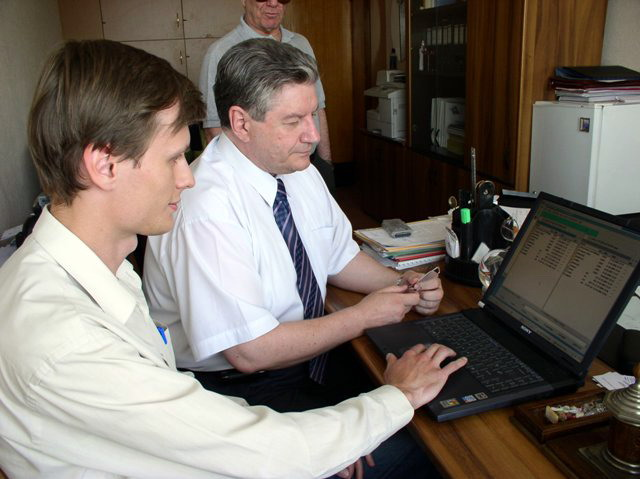
ReactOS project coordinator Aleksey Bragin shows ReactOS functionality to Viktor Alksnis.

Viktor Alksnis was a strong opponent of the breakup of the Soviet Union and of the independence of the Baltic states. He claimed that the Baltic states are apartheid regimes, and that the Russian population in these states are discriminated against.

In 1989, he was elected into the Supreme Soviet of the USSR. In 1990, he was elected to the Supreme Council of the Republic of Latvia. In 1990, he was one of the founders of a hard-line group "Soyuz" within the USSR Supreme Soviet. He once proposed the ousting of Soviet leader Mikhail Gorbachev from power, dissolving the parliament, outlawing all parties, declaring martial law and the handing of power to a Military "Committee of National Salvation", which would avoid the disintegration of the Soviet Union.

He described the internationally non-recognized Transnistrian Republic as the base from which the restoration of the Soviet Union would begin.

In later years Alksnis claimed to be a principal figure behind the Riga OMON, known for opposing the secession of Latvia from the USSR and actions such as the Soviet OMON assaults on Lithuanian border posts.

He was designated persona non grata in Latvia after he left the country in 1992. Since that time he took part in Russian politics, representing left-wing and nationalist positions. Alksnis was one of the leaders of the National Salvation Front that united nationalist and communist movements that opposed Yeltsin's policies. In 2005, he was named persona non grata in Ukraine as well, after he called for a Russian-Ukrainian border revision while speaking at a rally in Simferopol, Crimea.

== Free software advocacy campaign ==
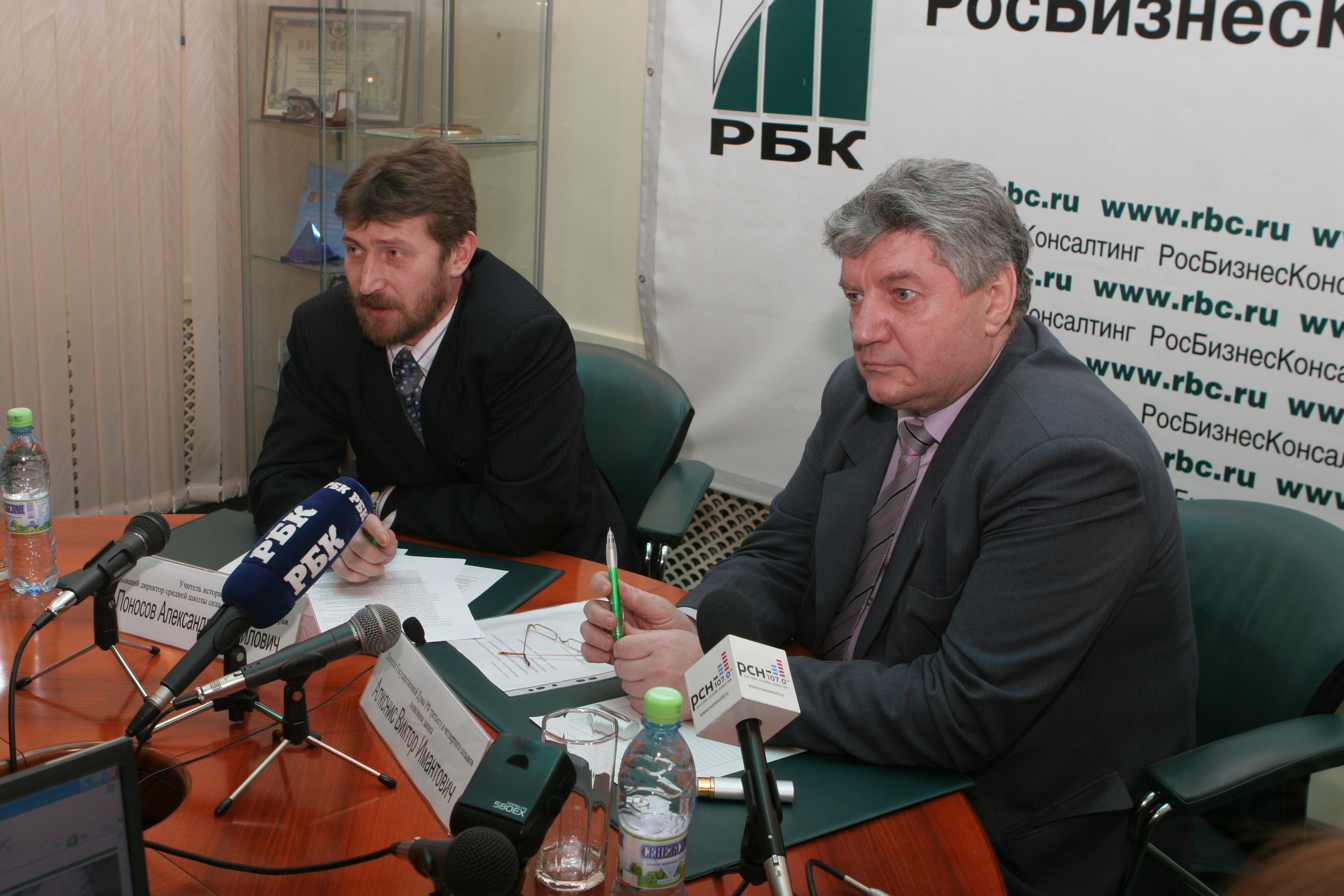
Alexander Ponosov and Viktor Alksnis

In 2007, Alksnis launched a campaign to promote the use of free software such as the Linux operating system in Russian state institutions to secure software independence.

In February 2008 he joined forces with Aleksandr Ponosov, a school teacher accused of software piracy, to form the Center of Free Technology, a non-profit initiative with the purpose of researching methods for the usage of Free Software in the Russian education system.

Alksnis met with project coordinator Aleksey Bragin to promote the development of the ReactOS operating system. He also invited Richard Stallman, the founder of the GNU project and Free Software Foundation to Moscow. However, Stallman cancelled the visit due to the controversy surrounding Alksnis.

== Views on global politics ==
In 2006, Alksnis said in an interview that Israel and the United States are enemies of Iran's peaceful nuclear program, and their hostile attitude towards Iran is an attempt to cover up the United States' mistakes in Iraq.

Alksnis openly supported the Russian invasion of Ukraine, 2022.

== Death ==
Alksnis died on 1 January 2025, at the age of 74, after a stroke.
