= Vladimir Solonari =

Moldovan-American historian and politician

- Born: 20 October 1959 (age 66); Chișinău, Moldavian SSR, USSR (now Moldova)
- Citizenship: Moldova; United States
- Occupations: historian, academic, author, politician
- Employer: University of Central Florida

Academic background
- Education: Moldova State University; Moscow State University

Academic work
- Main interests: political history, ethnic cleansing, the Holocaust in Romania, the Holocaust in Ukraine
- Notable works: Purifying the Nation: Population Exchange and Ethnic Cleansing in Nazi-Allied Romania (2010); A Satellite Empire (2019)

Member of the Parliament of Moldova
- In office 1991–2001

Member of the Supreme Soviet of the Moldavian Soviet Socialist Republic
- In office 1990–1991

Personal details
- Party: Unity Movement for Equality in Rights (1989–1997); Civic Party of Moldova (1997–1999); Movement for a Democratic and Prosperous Moldova (1999–2003)

Vladimir Solonari (born 20 October 1959) is a Moldovan-American historian, university professor, and former politician.

== Biography ==
Solonari was born in a family of ethnic Ukrainian speakers of Russian. He graduated from the Faculty of History at the State University of Chișinău in 1981 and, with the support of Alexandru Moșanu, he pursued doctoral studies at Moscow State University, obtaining the title of Candidate of Historical Sciences in 1986 with a thesis on the British Labour Party's programmatic issues in the late 1960s and early 1970s. Between 1986 and 1990, he taught at the State University of Chișinău and, between 1992-1993, at the University of Tiraspol.

In 1990, Solonari was a founding leader of the pro-Soviet Unity Movement for Equality in Rights and he was elected as a deputy in the Supreme Soviet of the Moldavian SSR. Following the independence of the Republic of Moldova, which he opposed, he served as a member of the Moldovan Parliament from 1991 to 2001. During this period, he was a member of the commission that drafted the Moldovan Constitution between 1993 and 1994 and its amendments in 2000. He also served as Chairman of the Parliamentary Committee on Human Rights and National Minorities from 1994 to 2001 and as Rapporteur for the Committee on Legal Affairs and Human Rights of the Parliamentary Assembly of the Council of Europe on the issue of the Muslim minority in Western Thrace, Greece, from 1999 to 2000.

In 1997, Solonari founded the Civic Party of Moldova and served as its president until 1999. The party joined the "For a Democratic and Prosperous Moldova" alliance to contest the 1998 elections. The alliance received 18% of the vote, winning 24 of the 101 seats and becoming the third-largest faction in Parliament. It formed the Alliance for Democracy and Reforms coalition together with the Democratic Convention of Moldova, the Christian Democratic Popular Front and the Party of Democratic Forces, which was able to form a government led by Ion Ciubuc. After 2001, he withdrew from political life and focused on his academic career.

In 2003, Solonari accepted a position at the University of Central Florida, where he is currently a professor in the Department of History. His research focuses on the policy of ethnic cleansing in World War II Romania. He has published several works on the history of Romania, the Republic of Moldova, and the Soviet Union, including the book Purifying the Nation: Population Exchange and Ethnic Cleansing in Nazi-Allied Romania (2009). His book A Satellite Empire: Romanian Rule in Southwestern Ukraine, 1941–1944 received honorable mention from the American Association of Ukrainian Studies in 2021.

== Criticism and controversies ==
Journalist Constantin Tănase wrote in his newspaper, Timpul de dimineață, in 2000, a critical article against Solonari. He accused the historian of hypocrisy, claiming that:

Having been elected in the first Parliament as the prominent leader of the chauvinistic, fundamentalist and anti-national movement, named „Interfront”, Solonari went through the phase of the socialism of Senik and Krilov, to the "centrist" movement of Dumitru Diacov. Starting from eighty-something as a defender of the rights of the „persecuted” Russian-speakers, he has today reached the European stage of defending human rights in general. Solonari has been delegated to Strasbourg by our Parliament to defend human rights and democracy. (In ’98, it seems to me, he had occupied the first place among the top deputies who had spent the most money on trips abroad).

In a March 2022 interview in Deutsche Welle, Solonari said about his political past:

Before I was against the unification of Moldova and Romania, for several reasons, but at this point, I would like it very much, as a form of safety. Otherwise it is possible that Moldovans will once again be under Russian rule, after all these years of independence and so many hardships. There are many in Moldova that do not consider Russian occupation to be a disaster, but for me it is unacceptable. I am not Romanian, I was born in Chișinău and for a long time I was pro-Russian, but now I am not. The Government in Chișinău I think that is a healthy and rational government and that it is in talks with Bucharest, that it is exploring this possibility. I realize that these things cannot be openly declared, but I think that they must be ready for such an eventuality. There is a strong rationale: by uniting we obtain defense from NATO. If the two states decide to unite and do all the necessary formalities, I do not think NATO says no.
