= Interfront =

Pro-Soviet and anti-independence political movement

Interfront was a pro-communist political movement that aimed to preserve the Soviet Union as a unified Marxist–Leninist state and strongly opposed the pro-independence movements in the republics. It had branches in Estonia, Latvia, Lithuania, Moldova, Ukraine and other union republics.

== Branches ==
- Intermovement – the Estonian branch
- International Front of the Working People of Latvia – the Latvian branch
- Yedinstvo – the Lithuanian branch
- Unity Movement for Equality in Rights – the Moldavian branch, founder of Transnistria
- International Movement of Donbass – the Ukrainian branch

== Opposition ==
- Popular Front of Estonia
- Popular Front of Latvia
- Popular Front of Moldova
- People's Movement of Ukraine
- Rastokhez
- Sąjūdis

== See also ==
- Dissolution of the Soviet Union
- Soviet Union Soyuz, pro-Russian Soyuz in Crimea
