= Tuchkovo =

Tuchkovo Тучково
- Work settlement
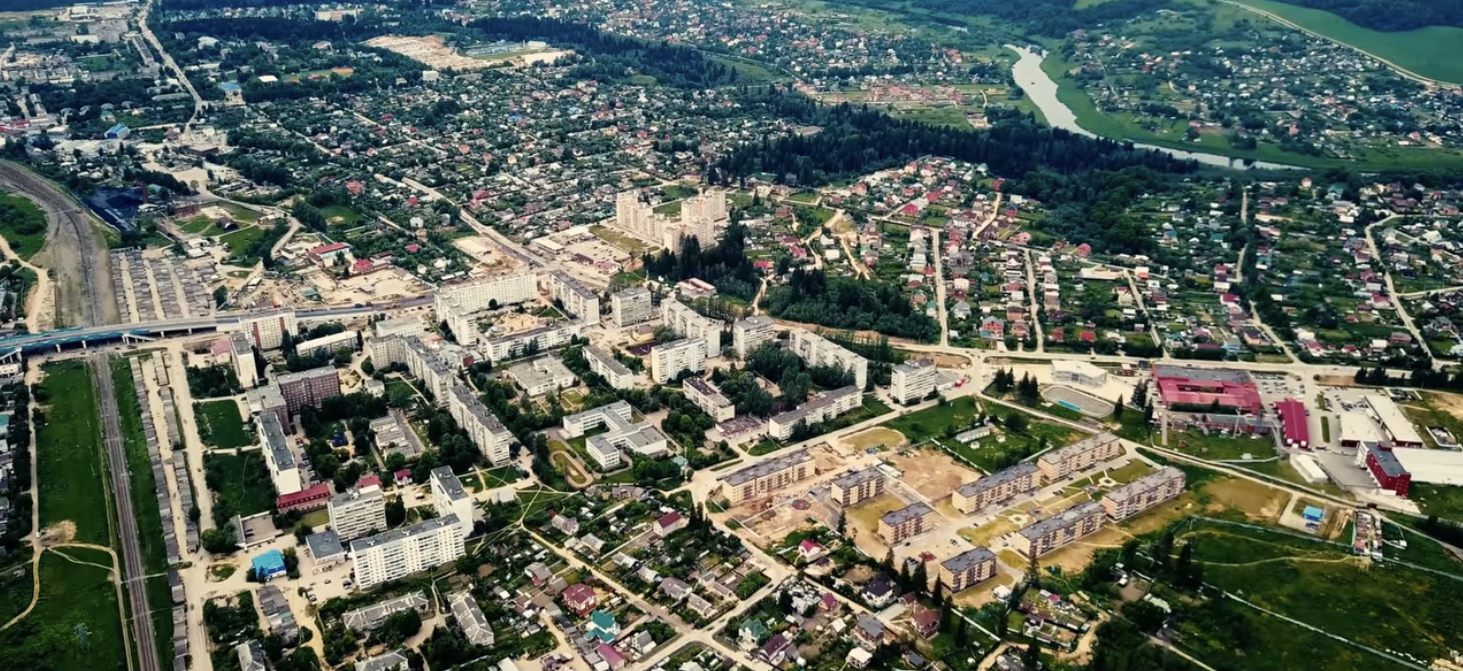

- Location within Moscow Oblast Location within Russia
- Coordinates: 55°36′00″N 36°28′12″E
- Country: Russia
- Region: Moscow Oblast
- District: Ruzsky District
- Time zone: UTC+3:00

Tuchkovo (Russian: Тучково) is an urban locality (a work settlement) in Ruzsky District, Moscow Oblast, Russia. Population: 17,381 (2010 census); 16,966 (2002 census); 15,047 (1989 Soviet census).

== History ==
=== History of local government ===
On 13 December 2009, the head of the village, Vitaly Ustimenko, and his wife were killed. Ustimenko was elected head of the village just two months before the murder. After the elections, he began to wage a decisive fight against corruption and to restore order using budget funds. He was allegedly killed because of his political activities. At the time of the murder, a lawsuit was already pending in court to declare the elections invalid.

On 14 March 2010, Viktor Alksnis won the election for the new head of the village. The votes were distributed as follows:

- V. I. Alksnis — 3175 votes (41.3%)
- N. P. Anischuk — 1478 votes (19.3%)
- R. V. Blokhin — 1472 votes (19.1%)
- G. V. Beretennikov — 875 votes (12.3%)

According to Alksnis, during the election campaign and elections, voters were put under unprecedented pressure; however, this did not affect the results, after which "dirty election technologies" were used - according to the candidate, three ballots were stuffed at polling station No. 2518, and seven were stuffed at polling station No. 2519. Despite such a small number of ballots thrown in, on 15 March, the territorial election commission of the Ruza region voted to invalidate the election results.

On 5 May, the Ruzsky District Court rejected Alksnis's complaint against the decision of the territorial election commission of the Ruzsky District to cancel the election results for the head of the urban settlement of Tuchkovo on 14 March 2010.

Almost simultaneously, R.V. Blokhin, who lost the elections, became first deputy head of the urban settlement:

On 4 May, a meeting of the Council of Deputies of the village of Tuchkovo was held, at which O. A. Tumakova, deputy head of the village, was appointed acting head of the urban settlement of Tuchkovo. By her first order, she appointed R. Blokhin, a former candidate for the post of head, to the post of first deputy head of the urban settlement of Tuchkovo.

On 5 May, the head of the Ruza district, O. Yakunin, held a meeting with entrepreneurs of the village of Tuchkovo, at which he introduced the new first deputy head of the village to the audience. From his speech, some of those present concluded that Mr. Blokhin would be Yakunin's successor as head of the Ruzsky District. Moreover, R. Blokhin himself does not deny that he intends to run for the post of head of the Ruzsky District. That is why it is so important for him to work in Tuchkovo to win the trust and support of Tuchkovo voters. However, in reality, everything is much simpler. As you know, the head of the Ruza district is in a "pre-trial state"; he is involved in a high-profile case of corruption in the Ruza district. Therefore, according to some sources, he is allegedly being urgently removed from the chopping block.

— Alksnis, Viktor. "Государственный переворот местного розлива" [Local bottling coup d'état]. v-alksnis2.livejournal.com (in Russian).

On 11 August, the Council of Deputies removed the acting powers and assigned them to the head of the social policy department, Dmitry Usach. However, Roman Blokhin disagreed with this and presented an order to dismiss Usach. Until 17 August, it remained unclear who the head was; on 17 August, the prosecutor, the head of the district, and the head of the internal affairs department recognized Dmitry Pavlovich Usach as the acting head.

On 31 August, at a meeting of the Council of Deputies, Dmitry Usach asked to remove the powers of the acting head and proposed Efendi Khaidakov, who was hired on 30 August, for this position. The deputies accepted their resignation, and Efendi Yusupovich Khaidakov became the acting head.

On 4 September, the changes to the Charter initiated by a group of deputies came into force, and on 6 September, at an extraordinary council of deputies, the chairman of the Council of Deputies was elected by secret ballot, who now becomes the head of the city settlement. The winner was Margarita Ivanovna Tikhonova (7 votes); in second place was Viktor Grigorievich Fedotov (6 votes).

Since 18 September 2013, the head of the urban settlement has been Viktor Alksnis.

On 26 April 2015, early elections to the Council of Deputies took place in Tuchkovo. The head of the Tuchkovo settlement was Zhanna Fedorovna Kiseleva. Efendi Yusupovich Khaidakov headed the local administration.
