= Vladimir Hütt =

Estonian philosopher (1936–1997)

Vladimir Hütt (18 April 1936 in Leningrad – 4 June 1997) was an Estonian philosopher.

== Early life and career ==
He was born in Leningrad, Russia RFSR and move to Estonia after the annexation of Estonia by the USSR. Hütt, a physicist by education, mostly dealt with philosophy of physics, scientific world-view and the theory of cognition. His works followed the Marxist line of thought that was official in the USSR. Most of Hütt's works were published in Russian. In 1979 Hütt published a monographic overview entitled "Philosophical Problems of Physics in Soviet Estonia in 30 Years 1948–1978", where he expounded his philosophical ideas about the complementarity and objectivity in physical knowledge. In 1980s, he worked at the Obninsk State Technical University for Nuclear Power Engineering as the head of the chair of social sciences and philosophy. During the Perestroika era, he remained a committed communist, supporting the pro-Soviet Intermovement after its founding in the late 1980s.

== Publications ==
- Filosofskie voprosy fiziki v sovetskoj Estonii za 30 let (1948-1978), Published by AN ESSR, 1979 ('Philosophical questions of physics in the Soviet Estonia during 30 years (1948–1978)')
- Abiks õpetajale-propagandistile (Teacher's propaganda guide), Eesti NSV Õpetajate Täiendusinstituut, Published by Eesti NSV Haridusministeerium, 1984
- Рецепция философии М. Хайдеггера в Эстонии : проблемно-аналитический обзор. Москва : ИНИОН, 1991 (On the reception of Heidegger's philosophy in Estonia)
