= Unity Movement for Equality in Rights =

- Founder: Petru Șornikov; Andrei Safonov; Vladimir Solonari
- Founded: July 1989
- Dissolved: 1998
- Ideology: Socialism; Russian nationalism
- Political position: Left-wing to far-left

The Unity Movement for Equality in Rights (Romanian: Mișcarea republicană pentru egalitate în drepturi "Unitate-Edinstvo", MUE) was a political party in Moldova.

== History ==
The party was formed in July 1989 as Interfront, part of a left-wing pan-Soviet Union movement. Its founders were members of ethnic minorities including Andrey Safonov, Piotr Șornikov and Vladimir Solonari, whose aim was to counteract the Popular Front of Moldova. In 1991 Interfront MPs refused to sign the Moldovan Declaration of Independence, instead pushing for a federation within the Soviet Union split into Gagauz, Moldovan and Russian entities.

In December 1991 the party was renamed Unity Movement for Equality in Rights. It formed an alliance with the Socialist Party to contest the 1994 elections. The alliance was also supported by the then-unregistered Party of Communists of the Republic of Moldova, and won 28 seats in the election, making it the second-largest faction in Parliament after the Democratic Agrarian Party of Moldova, which had won 56 of the 104 seats.

Prior to the 1998 elections the MUE joined the Socialist Unity alliance alongside the Socialist Party, the Union of Communists of Moldova and the Vatan Popular Party. However, the alliance failed to win a seat. The Socialist Party later joined the Braghiș Alliance, whilst the other parties, including MUE, did not re-register. Its ideological successors are the Party of Communists of the Republic of Moldova, as well as the Party of Socialists of the Republic of Moldova.
