= Soyuz (faction) =

Union Союз
- Leader: Viktor Alksnis; Yegor Ligachev
- Founded: February 1990
- Dissolved: September 1999
- Merged into: Russian All-People's Union; Stalin Bloc – For the USSR
- Ideology: Neo-Stalinism
- National affiliation: Communist Party of the Soviet Union (until 1991)

Soyuz (Russian: Союз, translated as 'Union') was a faction in the Congress of People's Deputies of the USSR. The faction was critical of Perestroika and liberal reforms; it was opposed to de-centralization of the Soviet Union. The group was founded on 14 February 1990, and its leaders included Viktor Alksnis (from Latvian SSR), Yegor Ligachev, Nikolai Petrushenko, Yevgeny Kogan (Estonian SSR), and Anatoly Checkoyev (Georgian SSR, South Ossetian autonomous region). The faction claimed to have 500 members in the USSR Supreme Soviet.

The group managed to oust Soviet foreign minister Eduard Shevardnadze for 'giving up' Eastern Europe. In February 1991, it asked for a 'state of emergency' to be introduced in the USSR. The Soyuz faction did not formally support the August Coup of 1991, an event that had devastating consequences for the faction. Many of the group leaders joined Sergei Baburin's movement Russian All-People's Union and the related Rossiya faction in the RSFSR parliament (sometimes called the sister faction of the Soyuz group). An organization with the same name continued to exist as a political movement in the post-Soviet Russia, featuring communist/Neo-Stalinist views. That organisation took part in the 1995 legislative election within the bloc Power to the People, led by Baburin and Nikolai Ryzhkov. In the 1999 legislative election, the Soyuz movement, then led by Georgy Tikhonov, took part within the Stalin Bloc — For the USSR coalition.

== See also ==
- Soyuz (political party)
