= International Front of the Working People of Latvia =

Pro-Soviet organization in Lativian SSR

International Front of the Working People of Latvia Интернациональный фронт трудящихся Латвийской ССР (Интерфронт)
- Leader: Igor Lopatin; Anatoly Alekseyev; Tatjana Ždanoka
- Founded: January 1989
- Banned: 10 September 1991
- Headquarters: Riga
- Newspaper: Yedinstvo
- Ideology: Communism; Marxism–Leninism; Soviet patriotism Russian minority politics
- Political position: Far-left
- National affiliation: Communist Party of the Soviet Union
- Colours: Red

Party flag

The International Front of the Working People of the Latvian SSR or Interfront (Latvian: Latvijas PSR Internacionālā Darbaļaužu fronte, Interfronte, Russian: Интернациональный фронт трудящихся Латвийской ССР, Интерфронт, romanized: Internatsionalnyy front trudyashchikhsya Latviyskoy SSR; Interfront) was a pro-Soviet socialist organization in the Latvian SSR, which during the years 1989–1991, supported Latvia remaining part of the USSR. Its membership was largely made up of ethnic Russians within Latvia.

Interfront was founded in January 1989 as a reaction to the creation of the pro-independence Popular Front of Latvia. In 1989 it took part in forming the United Front of Workers of the USSR (Объединенный фронт трудящихся СССР). Its membership consisted almost entirely of Soviet military members and Communist Party officials.

The Interfront central leadership published a newspaper Yedinstvo (Russian: Единство, 'Unity'). Local sections of the organisation, for example in Liepāja, published their own information bulletins. Interfront also made radio broadcasts.

Among the leaders of Interfront were Igor Lopatin, Anatoly Alekseyev, and Tatjana Ždanoka.

Interfront was particularly active during the January 1991 events in Latvia, during which several civilians and law enforcement officers were killed in clashes with OMON units loyal to the central government in Moscow.

In September 1991, following the failed August Coup attempt and the restoration of Latvian independence from the USSR, the transitional parliament, the Supreme Council passed a law banning Interfront and the Communist Party of Latvia.

As a result of the ban, those known to have been members in Interfront after 13 January 1991 have faced restrictions on naturalization as citizens of Latvia. Former Interfront activists who hold citizenship of Latvia have been prohibited from standing as candidates for election to the Saeima (parliament) or municipal councils.

== See also ==
- Interfront
