= Ellinor Aiki =

Estonian painter (1893–1969)

- Born: Ellinor Blumenfeldt; 11 January 1893; Tõstamaa, Kreis Pernau, Governorate of Livonia, Russian Empire
- Died: 25 October 1969 (age 76); Tartu, then part of Estonian SSR, Soviet Union

Ellinor Aiki (11 January 1893 – 25 October 1969) was an Estonian painter who is possibly best recalled for her works in later life of vibrant and colorful, heavily textured portraits, landscapes and compositions interspersed with whimsical motifs.

== Early life ==
Born Ellinor Blumenfeldt into an ethnically Estonian Lutheran family in Tõstamaa, she would later change her surname to Aiki in 1935. At age six she suffered a debilitating fall which resulted in her contracting a severe case of bone and joint tuberculosis that would render her bedridden for nearly six years and plague her throughout her life. She graduated from secondary school in Pärnu in 1909, after which she worked as a children's hospital attendant and teacher and studied in St. Petersburg, Ukraine and Belarus until 1917 when she returned to Estonia.

== Studies ==
Because of her chronic leg pain due to her bone and joint tuberculosis, her studies were often put on hold. In the winter of 1928 she passed entrance examinations to the Pallas Art School in Tartu at the age of 35, initially studying graphics. From 1930 to 1934, she studied monotyping at Ado Vabbe's graphics studio and from 1935 to 1936 she studied etching and lithography with Hando Mugasto. She graduated from the Higher Art School Pallas in 1936 at age 43 after studying painting at the Nikolai Triik painting studio. Among her graduating classmates were artists Johannes Võerahansu, Richard Sagrits and Karl Pärsimägi.

== Career ==
Following her graduation from the Higher Art School Pallas, Ellinor Aiki became a freelance artist in Tartu. In 1937 she worked at the Vanemuine Theatre. From 1940 to 1941, she was a member of the Estonian Artists' Cooperative (Eesti Kunstnike Kooperatiivis.) During the occupation of Estonia by Nazi Germany she worked at the Tartu Artists' Bureau. Upon the Soviet occupation of Estonia in 1944, she fled to Germany. However, she returned to Estonia in 1946. Following her return, she was removed from the Estonian Artists' Union by Soviet authorities until 1957, being censured for her use of formalism. During this period, she withdrew from public life and painted very little. Up until her ban from producing art, her ouvre had consisted mainly of paintings of still lifes, portraits, cityscapes and landscapes in rather somber, muted hues.

It was not until after her ban by authorities had been lifted in 1957 that Aiki's work become more popular, as her ouvre had changed from somewhat bleak paintings in funereal tones to vivid, bold colored, heavily textured paintings that often incorporated images of fantasy and whimsy; Aiki's work from the early 1960s onward would often include bright oranges, greens and purples.

Although she had studied at and graduated from art school with formal training, she would include strong elements of naïve art (primitivism) and humorous influences in her works during this period, taking inspiration from fairy tales and poetry.

== Death ==
In the spring of 1969, Estonian art historian Tui Koorti coordinated a personal exhibition of Ellinor Aiki's works at the Tartu Art Museum, with about a hundred of her works from 1928 to 1969 on display. Aiki died that October at the age of 76.
