= Erich Leps =

Estonian painter (1901–1965)

- Born: Erich Lõps; November 30, 1901; Tallinn, Estonia
- Died: December 14, 1965 (aged 64); Chicago
- Education: State Industrial Art School, Pallas Art School
- Occupation: Painter
- Spouse: Pauline Elfriede Leps-Estam

Erich Leps (until 1936 Erich Lõps; November 30, 1901 – December 14, 1965) was an Estonian painter.

== Early life and education ==
Erich Leps was born Erich Lõps in Tallinn, the son of Hans Lõps (earlier Löps, 1864–1927) and Miina Lõps (née Ahlbert, 1865–1930). From 1916 to 1917, Leps studied drawing at the Tallinn Industrial Art School and he also worked as a junior draftsman at the Russian-Baltic Shipyard. At the beginning of 1918, he traveled to Russia and entered the maritime school in Kronstadt, where he studied until 1920, graduating there as a radio telegrapher. In 1921, he returned to Estonia and served in the defense forces. From 1924 to 1925, he studied again at the State Industrial Art School, and from 1925 to 1931 as a student of Nikolai Triik at the Pallas Art School. For his successful studies, he was awarded a scholarship from the Government Fine Arts Endowment to study in Paris (1931–1932). In the following years, short study trips took him to Italy, Switzerland, Germany, Finland, Sweden and Russia.

== Career ==
In the second half of the 1930s, Leps lived in Pärnu, where he opened his studio, gave lectures at the folk high school, and organized excursions to art exhibitions in Tallinn. From 1944 to 1949, he lived as a war refugee in Ulm, Germany. In 1949, he emigrated with his wife to the United States, where he first worked as an art teacher and portrait painter, later as an advertising artist in Hartford, Connecticut, and then in Chicago until his death.

== Work ==
Starting in 1928, Leps appeared at all exhibitions in Estonia organized by the Visual Arts Endowment Fund of the Cultural Endowment of Estonia and the Pallas art association. His paintings were also presented at foreign Estonian art exhibitions in Riga, Moscow, Germany, and elsewhere. Leps became known as a portraitist, and as a landscape and genre painter. The works of this prolific artist were found in many private collections, several art museums, and in the pre-war collection of the Pärnu Museum.

During his years of exile in Germany, Leps continued his intensive artistic activities, appearing at almost all exhibitions of Estonian art held in Germany. He organized and managed the first applied arts and crafts association of Estonian refugees in Ulm, Estonian Handicraft.

After emigrating to the United States, Leps mainly painted portraits of local doctors, politicians, and business figures for the first two years. In 1952, he started working as a painter for the General Outdoor Advertising Company. Due to his outstanding technical knowledge and skills, he was promoted to work at the Chicago headquarters of the same company, where he remained until 1965, when a serious illness forced him to quit his job.

== Family ==
Leps's wife was the graphic artist Pauline Elfriede Leps-Estam (1903–2002), whom he married on July 11, 1930. Their son was the educational researcher Ants Arvo Leps (1936–2008).

== Legacy ==
Erich Leps' wish was that his art collection would be sent to the Pärnu Museum in his homeland after his death. With the help of Minia Virve Leps and family friend Mai Treude, and with the support of the National Archives of Estonia, it turned out to be possible to fulfill the artist's wish. More than 120 works by Erich Leps, in addition to works by his wife, as well as works by and archive materials of Ida Emilie Adamson, Edmund S. Valtman, Salme Rosalie Riig, and even Eduard Wiiralt, were sent to Estonia.
