= Ida Emilie Adamson =

Estonian printmaker (1898–1989)

- Born: Ida Emilie Eschstamm; March 18, 1898; Pärnu, Estonia
- Died: May 10, 1989 (aged 91); Cupertino, California
- Education: Tartu Higher Music School, Pallas Art School
- Occupation: Printmaker
- Relatives: Pauline Elfriede Leps-Estam

Ida Emilie Adamson (née Eschstamm, later Estam; March 18, 1898 – May 10, 1989) was an Estonian printmaker.

== Early life and education ==
Adamson was born in Pärnu to Jaan Eschtamm (later Estam, 1867–1949) and Pauline Catharine Eschtamm (later Estam, née Kalbus; 1870–1961). She was the sister of the printmaker Pauline Elfriede Leps-Estam. She studied piano at Tartu Higher Music School (graduated in 1927) and Pallas Art School (graduated in 1932). From 1931 to 1932, she studied in the master's studio of Ado Vabbe.

== Career ==
Adamson left Estonia in 1944 and lived as a refugee in Germany. From there she relocated to Canada in 1949, and she then lived in the United States. She mainly produced free graphics, large-format compositions, book illustrations, and pencil drawings. Adamson died in Cupertino, California in 1989.

After the restoration of Estonian independence, Adamson's artwork was sent to the Pärnu Museum in Estonia together with works by her sister Pauline Elfriede Leps-Estam and her brother-in-law Erich Leps.
