= Alo Hoidre =

Estonian painter (1916–1993)

- Born: Aleksander Horn; January 26, 1916; Petrograd, Russian Empire
- Died: October 2, 1993 (aged 77); Tallinn, Estonia
- Occupations: Painter, book illustrator, and printmaker

Alo Hoidre (until 1935 Horn, né Aleksander; January 26, 1916 – October 2, 1993) was an Estonian painter, book illustrator, and printmaker.

== Life ==
Hoidre was born in Petrograd, Russia, and he moved to Tallinn with his family in 1920, where he attended Primary School No. 18. From 1933 to 1937, he studied lithography at the State Industrial Art School, and from 1938 to 1941 he studied graphic arts at the Pallas Art School. He was mobilized into the Red Army in 1941 and took part in the Battle of Velikiye Luki in the ranks of the 8th Estonian Rifle Corps. He was demobilized in 1943, and he received a scholarship to study in Moscow and Leningrad. Hoidre returned to Tallinn in 1944, where he was the head of the art department of the newspaper Sirp ja Vasar. From 1944 to 1982, he was a lecturer at the State Art Institute of the Estonian SSR.

== Artistic creation ==
Hoidre created both independent illustrations and illustrations for books, and he mastered the techniques of lithography. As a painter, he preferred tempera and oil painting. He took part in numerous Estonian and Soviet exhibitions, including the prestigious Tallinn Printmaking Triennale. After returning from the Second World War, Hoidre devoted himself to book illustrations and artworks with a military and industrial theme.

In 1951, Hoidre collaborated with Ott Kangilaski, Richard Sagrits, Richard Kaljo, and Edith Paris to illustrate Friedrich Reinhold Kreutzwald's Kalevipoeg. The highly popular method of collective work at that time was used for this high-profile publication prepared for the tenth anniversary of the Estonian SSR. The intertitles and vignettes were created by Richard Kaljo, and the ornamental design of the intertitles was the work of Edith Paris. Another new edition of Kalevipoeg was published by in the five-volume series of works released to mark the 150th anniversary of Kreutzwald's birth in 1953 with illustrations by these artists.

In his later creative years, having withdrawn from commissions and teaching at the art institute, Hoidre's personality as a painter manifested itself in hedonistic, cheerful compositions. In the 1980s and early 1990s, the artist experimented with various materials and techniques, creating abstract paintings and collages on copper plates, cardboard, and wood next to the canvas, mainly for himself, experimenting with the possibilities of abstract art and using unexpected methods and materials. The color of Hoidre's late works is rich and deep, and the themes explore the basic problems of human existence. The titles of his paintings are informative: Kirgastumine (Brightening) and Selginemine (Clarification). The work Selginemine, completed in 1971, was the prelude to the recognition that came to him in the early 1990s, which also saw him receive the Kristjan Raud Art Award.

One trend in Hoidre's work is related to grotesque, semi-abstract figures, which he cultivated in both painting and prints. For painting, he used mixed media such as gold paint to make the composition more expressive and attractive. As an artist, Hoidre played on the border between tragedy and comedy in his works. His Kompositsioon suplejatega (Composition with Bathers, 1980) shows the more humorous side of his work.

== Works ==
- 1939: Näod (Faces). Drypoint
- 1940: Kohtla-Järve (Kohtla-Järve). Lithography, paper
- 1940: The Monastery of Petseri by Hanno Kompus (Töökool). Cover illustration
- 1945: Rehepeks (Threshing). Lithography
- 1947: Ehitustööd Kiviõlis (Construction Work in Kiviõli). Lithography, paper
- 1947: Kiviõli (Kiviõli). Lithography, paper
- 1947: Kohtla-Järve (Kohtla-Järve). Lithography, paper
- 1948: Kohtla-Järve tehased (Kohtla-Järve Factories). Tempera, paper
- 1950: Punalipu üleandmine (Handing Over a Red Flag). Watercolor, Whatman paper. With Lepo Mikko and Priidu Aavik
- 1953: Jutustused (Tales), part 3, by Eduard Vilde (Eesti Riiklik Kirjastus). Illustrations
- 1955: Mahtra sõda (The Mahtra War). Charcoal
- 1958: Mahtra sõda (The Mahtra War) by Eduard Vilde (Eesti Riiklik Kirjastus). Cover illustration
- 1961: Lõhed (Gaps). Lithography, paper
- 1961: Pakane Punanina (Grandfather Frost the Red Nose) by Nikolay Nekrasov (Eesti Riiklik Kirjastus). Illustrations
- 1963: Pühajärv (Holy Lake). Lithography, paper
- 1963: Ema (Mother) by Maxim Gorky (Eesti Riiklik Kirjastus). Cover illustration
- 1964: Otepää maastik (Otepää Landscape). Lithography, paper
- 1967: Kes levitab anekdoote? (Who Is Spreading These Stories?) by Lilli Promet (Eesti Raamat). Cover illustration
- 1971: Lelu (Toy). Lithography, mixed media
- 1971: Selgimine (Clarification). Oil, masonite
- 1971: Colas Breugnon by Romain Rolland (Eesti Raamat). Cover illustration
- 1974: Kotermannide laul (Kotermann's Song). Mixed media
- 1974: Mäeküla piimamees (The Dairyman of Mäeküla) by Eduard Vilde (Eesti Raamat). Cover illustration
- 1975: Peagi saabun (I Will Arrive Soon). Mixed media
- 1978: Anna Karenina by Leo Tolstoy (Eesti Raamat). Cover illustration
- 1980: Kompositsioon suplejatega (Composition with Bathers). Mixed media
- 1984: Hiiglaste tee (Giant's Causeway) by August Jakobson (Eesti Raamat). Cover illustration
- 1986: Kunstimeistrid (Portree Eduard Wiiraltist) (Masters of Art, Portrait of Eduard Wiiralt). Color lithography
- 1988: Karolina (Carolina). Lithography, paper
- 1990: Kübar (Hat). Oil

== Students ==
Notable artists that studied under Alo Hoidre include the book artist and poster artist Siima Škop (1920–2016) and the printmaker Maret Olvet (1930–2020).

== Exhibitions ==
- 1999 (February 3 – March 5): Gallery 36, Konrad Adenauer Foundation, Tundmatu Alo Hoidre (The Unknown Alo Hoidre)
- 2000 (until April 30): green wing of the Tammsaare Museum, Alo Hoidre. Viimased maalid (Alo Hoidre: The Last Paintings)
- 2005 (September 19 – March 3): Pärnu City Gallery, Retrospektiiv (Retrospective)

== Recognitions and awards ==
- 1969: Honored Artist of the Estonian SSR
- 1982: People's Artist of the Estonian SSR
- 1984: Kristjan Raud Art Award
- 1991: Kristjan Raud Art Award
