= Lepo =

Lepo may refer to:

== People ==
- Lepo Mikko (1911–1978), Estonian painter and teacher
- Lepo Sumera (1950–2000), Estonian composer and teacher

== Places ==
- Lepo, Zumalai, a suco in Timor-Leste

== Other ==
- Low Exercise Price Option
