= Lepo Mikko =

Estonian painter (1911–1978)

- Born: Leonid Mikk; December 7, 1911; Aruküla, Kreis Fellin, Governorate of Livonia, Russian Empire
- Died: December 6, 1978 (aged 66); Tallinn, Estonia
- Education: Estonian Academy of Arts; Pallas Art School
- Occupations: Painter, teacher

Lepo Mikko (legal name Lepo Mikk; December 7, 1911 – December 6, 1978) was an Estonian painter and teacher.

== Early life and education ==
Lepo Mikko was born Leonid Mikk in Aruküla, a former village in Viljandi County in the Russian Empire's Governorate of Livonia, the son of the farmer Jaak Mikk (1876–?) and Anna Mikk (née Järv, 1880–?). He graduated from Tuhalaane Primary School in 1927. Inspired by Juhan Muks, a painter from a neighboring farm, Leonid decided to devote himself to art studies. From 1927 to 1930, he studied decorative painting at the State Industrial Art School in Tallinn under the artists August Jansen and Roman Nyman. From 1930 to 1932, he studied painting at the Pallas Art School in Tartu. His teachers there were Voldemar Mellik and Villem Ormisson. From 1931 to 1935, his studies were interrupted due to a lack of money, and the future artist worked as a painter, land surveyor, farm worker, and finally photographer. From 1936 to 1939, he continued his studies in Nikolai Triik's studio, and toward the end of his studies he was hired by his teacher together with Elmar Kits and Richard Sagrits. A study trip to Paris, which was considered a requirement for graduates of the Pallas Art School, was canceled due to the outbreak of the Second World War.

== Career ==
From 1940 to 1941, Mikko worked as an administrator at the Estonian Artists' Cooperative and then as a teacher at the Konrad Mägi Higher State School of Art, which was founded after the liquidation of the Pallas Art School by the Soviet administration.

In 1944, at the invitation of Ferdi Sannamees, Mikko moved to Tallinn, where he taught painting at the Tallinn State Applied Art Institute of the ESSR (later the State Art Institute of the Estonian SSR), and where he worked until his death. In 1944 he also became a member of the Artists' Union of the Estonian SSR. In 1947 he became an associate professor, and in 1965 a professor. Artists that studied under him include Malle Leis, Kristiina Kaasik, Tiit Pääsuke, Gennadi Leontjev, Tõnis Soop, and Saskia Kasemaa.

Mikko died in 1978 and was buried in Tallinn's Forest Cemetery.

== Creative work ==
Mikko displayed his works for the first time at the Government Fine Arts Endowment Exhibition in 1937. In the early 1940s, Mikko created still lifes, small-format nude paintings, and landscapes. During the Khrushchev Thaw, he developed his characteristic geometrizing image interpretation, with combinations of broken tones and a connection with the rural milieu that was changing under the influence of the socio-modernist architecture of that era, the laconic decor of consumer art objects, and technical progress. His extensive series of works depicting musical instruments from the late 1950s, and a number of still lifes with instruments, jugs, tablecloths, and books have become classics.

By the early 1950s, the artist became interested in monumental painting. The ceramic wall panel of the Central Library of the Estonian Academy of Sciences was created from numerous pieces. Mikko's design was judged to be the best in the competition held in 1961 and, after two years of work, a cardboard drawing of the panel (3.0 m × 4.5 m) was completed, which was then executed in ceramic at the artist's request. The panel depicts family, education, and science through large symbolic figures. In the middle of the composition, a boy is holding a book. The panel was made by the ceramists Naima Uustalu and Mall Valk.

The year 1960 marked the beginning of an exceptionally intense and stylistically variegated period of work for Mikko. Starting in the mid-1960s, the artist preferred to express himself in multi-part figurative compositions. He cultivated all genres of painting, mostly figure composition and still lifes. In the second half of the 1960s, he received several commissions, the themes of which were related to the conquest of space at that time. The best known of his late works are Kollane madonna (The Yellow Madonna) and Natüürmort granaatõuntega (Still Life with Pomegranates).

In 1962, Mikko's first solo exhibition was held at the Tartu Art Museum, and in 1962 and 1963 he displayed works in exhibitions in Kaunas and Vilnius. In 1965, a personal exhibition was held at the Art Museum of Estonia.

== Family ==
Mikko was married to the artist Agnes Lamp-Mikk (1910–1981), and their son was the actor Tõnu Mikk (1941–2018).

== Awards and recognitions ==
- 1963: Honored Artist of the Estonian SSR
- 1972: People's Artist of the Estonian SSR
- 1972: Prize of Soviet Estonia for the paintings Aegade laulud (Songs of the Ages), Ajaratas (The Wheel of Time), and Inimene ja kosmos (Man and Space)
- 1976: Kristjan Raud Art Award for the paintings Elujuured (Roots of Life) and Kivine maa (Rocky Land) (oil)
