= Konguta Nature Reserve =

Protected area in Estonia

- Location within Estonia
- Location: Estonia
- Coordinates: 58°12′40″N 26°16′40″E
- Area: 33 ha (82 acres)
- Established: 2006

Konguta Nature Reserve is a nature reserve which is located in Tartu County, Estonia.

The area of the nature reserve is 33 ha.

The protected area was founded in 2006 to protect valuable habitat types and threatened species in Konguta village (former Konguta Parish).
