= Ivo Kuusk =

Estonian opera singer (1937–2023)

- Born: 8 August 1937; Konguta, Estonia
- Died: 13 November 2023 (aged 86)
- Genres: Opera
- Occupation: Musician
- Instrument: Singing
- Formerly of: Estonian National Opera
- Awards: Order of the White Star, IV class (2005)

Ivo Kuusk (8 August 1937 – 13 November 2023) was an Estonian opera tenor.

== Life and career ==
Ivo Kuusk was born in Konguta on 8 August 1937. He was for a long time the leading soloist at . In 2005, he was awarded the Order of the White Star, IV class. Kuusk died on 13 November 2023, at the age of 86.
