= Jõesaar =

Jõesaar is an Estonian surname. Notable people with the surname include:

- Ernst Jõesaar (1905–1985), Estonian sculptor
- Janari Jõesaar (born 1993), Estonian professional basketball player
