= Pauline Elfriede Leps-Estam =

Estonian printmaker (1903–2002)

- Born: Pauline Eschstamm; November 3, 1903; Pärnu, Estonia
- Died: March 5, 2002 (aged 98); Northridge, Los Angeles, California
- Education: Tartu Higher Music School, Pallas Art School
- Occupation: Printmaker
- Spouse: Erich Leps
- Relatives: Ida Emilie Adamson

Pauline Elfriede Leps-Estam (also Estam-Leps, until 1930 Estam, née Eschstamm, November 3, 1903 – March 5, 2002) was an Estonian printmaker.

== Early life and education ==
Leps-Estam was born in Pärnu, the daughter of Jaan Eschtamm (later Estam, 1867–1949) and Pauline Catharine Eschtamm (later Estam, née Kalbus; 1870–1961). She started school in 1922 at Pärnu City High School for Girls and continued the following year at the Tartu Normal School. She studied from 1924 to 1925 at Tartu Higher Music School and from 1929 to 1931 at the Pallas Art School.

== Career and works ==
Leps-Estam worked as a singing and music teacher in Pärnu until the Second World War. She went to Germany as a war refugee in 1944, and from there to the United States in 1949. She studied printmaking from 1968 to 1975 at the Art Institute of Chicago, and from 1975 to 1980 at Santa Monica College in California.

Her first drawings appeared in 1930 in the magazine Olion. She depicted natural scenes and symbolist compositions in free graphics of a romantic nature.

After the restoration of Estonian independence, over 300 graphic works and twenty book illustrations were sent to the Pärnu Museum in Estonia together with the works of her husband Erich Leps, as well as works by her sister, Ida Emilie Adamson.

== Family ==
Leps-Estam's sister was the artist Ida Emilie Adamson (1898–1989). Her husband was the painter Erich Leps (1901–1965), whom she married on July 11, 1930. Their son was the educational researcher Ants Arvo Leps (1936–2008).
