= Kristjan Teder =

Estonian painter

Kristjan Teder (30 June 1901 – 2 April 1960) was an Estonian painter.

Teder was born in Priipalu (now Valga Parish), in the Kreis Dorpat of the Governorate of Livonia. As a teenager, he was a soldier in the Estonian War of Independence. From 1919-1925 he studied at Pallas Art School under the guidance of Konrad Mägi and Ado Vabbe. From 1926 until 1928, he studied in Paris.

Since 1945, he was a member of the onian Artists' Union. Many of his paintings depict some kind of flowers, but he also painted landscapes, dnd portraits.

Teder died in Tartu in 1960, aged fifty-nine.
