= Karl Pärsimägi =

Estonian painter

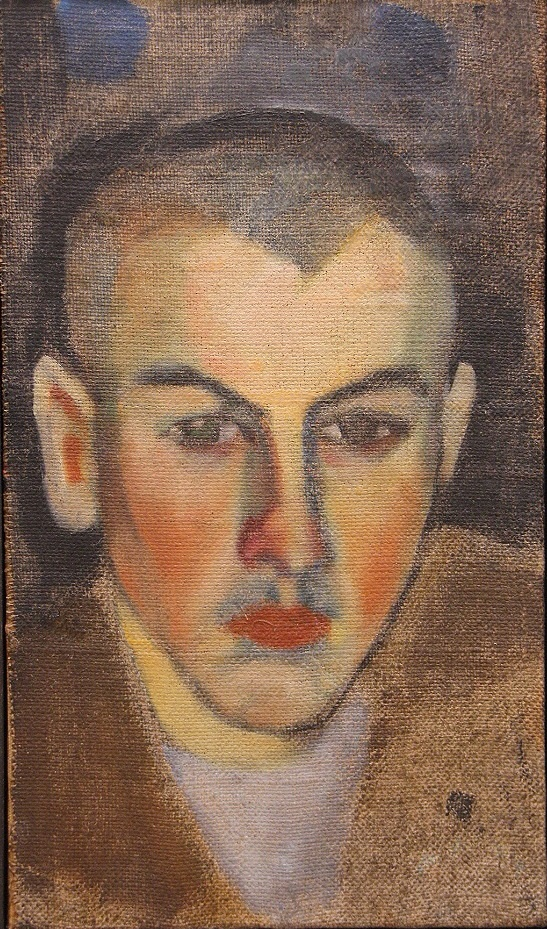
Self-portrait (c. 1930)

Karl Pärsimägi (11 May 1902 – 27 July 1942) was an Estonian Fauvist painter. He was murdered in Auschwitz concentration camp after being arrested in Paris.

== Biography ==
Karl Pärsimägi was born in Oe, Antsla Parish in 1902, Pärsimägi was the son of a wealthy "gentleman farmer". In 1919, he participated in the Estonian War of Independence and was awarded a medal. After that, against his father's wishes, he went to Tartu to enrol at the new Pallas Art School, known for promoting modern art. In addition to the newer styles, such as Fauvism, he found himself influenced by Estonian folk art and by Konrad Mägi, who was a teacher there. He also studied with Ado Vabbe and Nikolai Triik and went on a study trip to Germany in 1923. That same year, he held his first exhibition. He interrupted his training several times to visit the family farm and paint landscapes.

He moved to Paris in 1937 with the financial support of his father, who had finally become reconciled to his son's career choice. While there, he studied at the Académie Colarossi and came under the influence of Paul Cézanne, although he became known as the "Estonian Matisse". At the outbreak of World War II, unlike most other Baltic artists, he refused to return to his homeland, which was now occupied by the Russians.

In 1941, he was arrested by the Gestapo in Paris and taken to Auschwitz via Drancy internment camp. The reasons for his arrest remain unclear. He was not Jewish, but may have been trying to help a Jewish friend or active in the French Resistance. Sexual orientation has also been cited as a possible motive. He was murdered the following year.

Because of his support for Estonian independence, his works were denied official recognition by the Soviet Union, but interest was renewed after 1991. The 100th anniversary of his birth was celebrated with an exhibition and many of his works are now at the Tartu Art Museum.

== Selected paintings ==
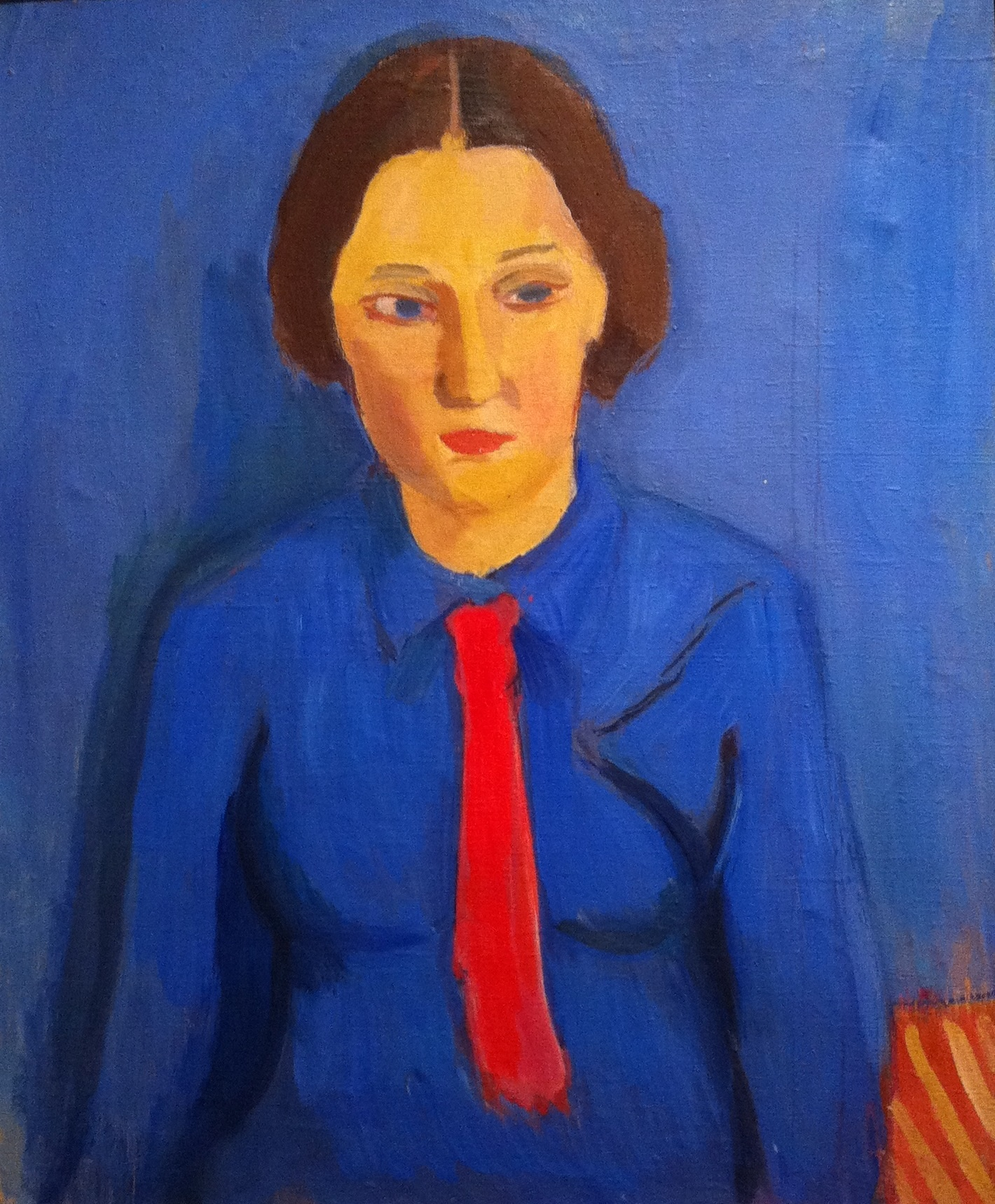
Portrait of a Woman

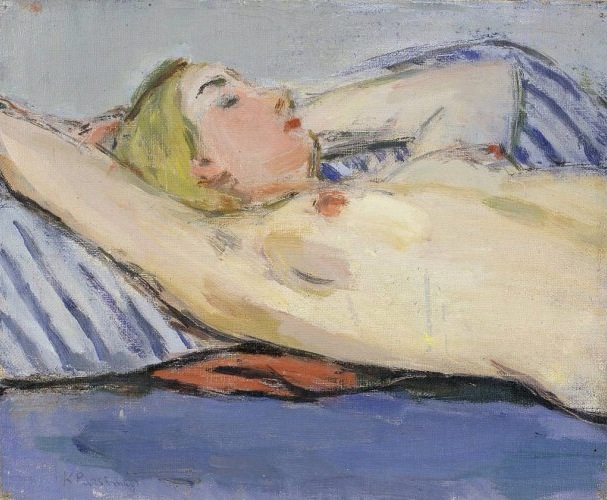
Lying Nude

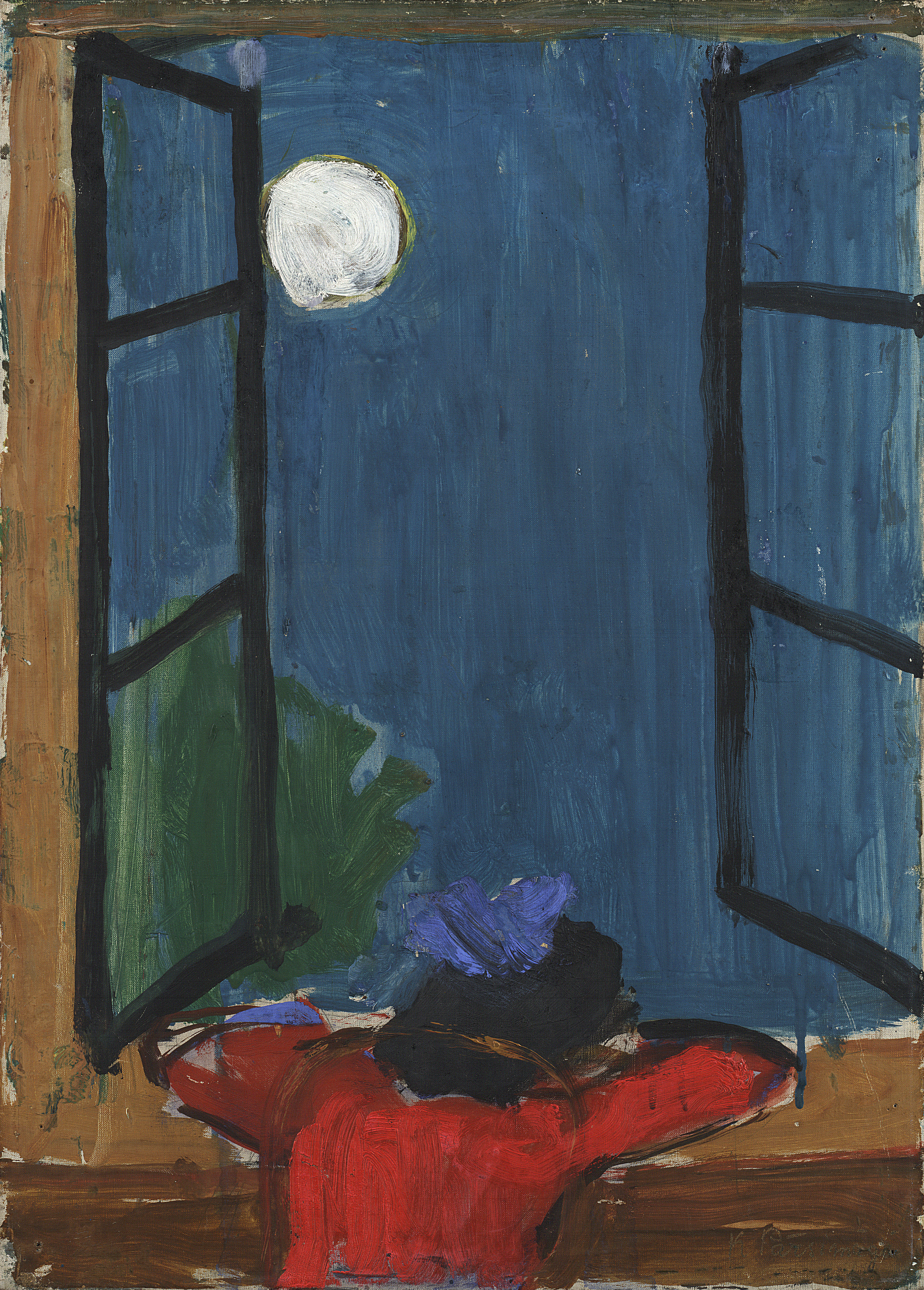
Girl at the Window

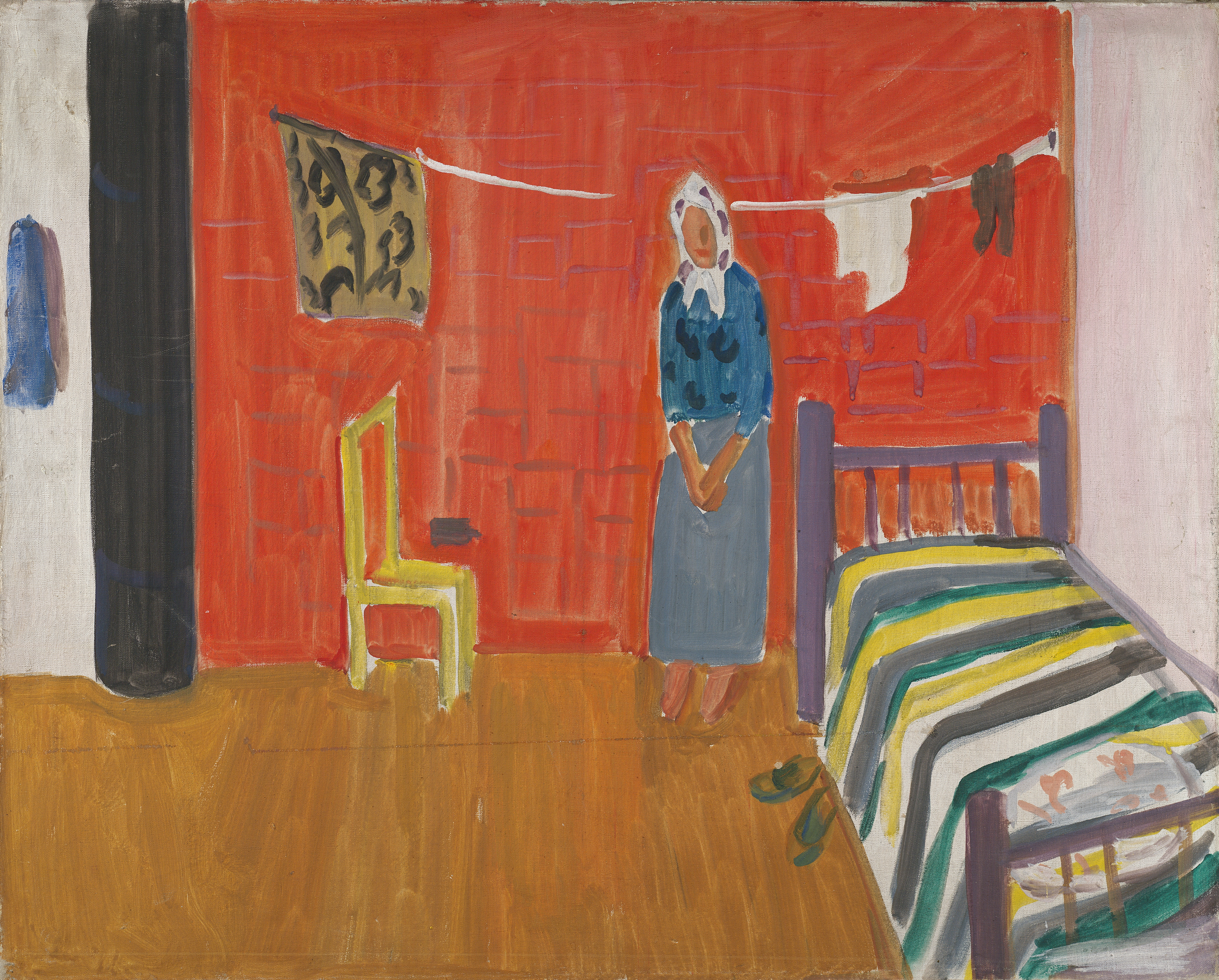
Farmhouse with a Stove

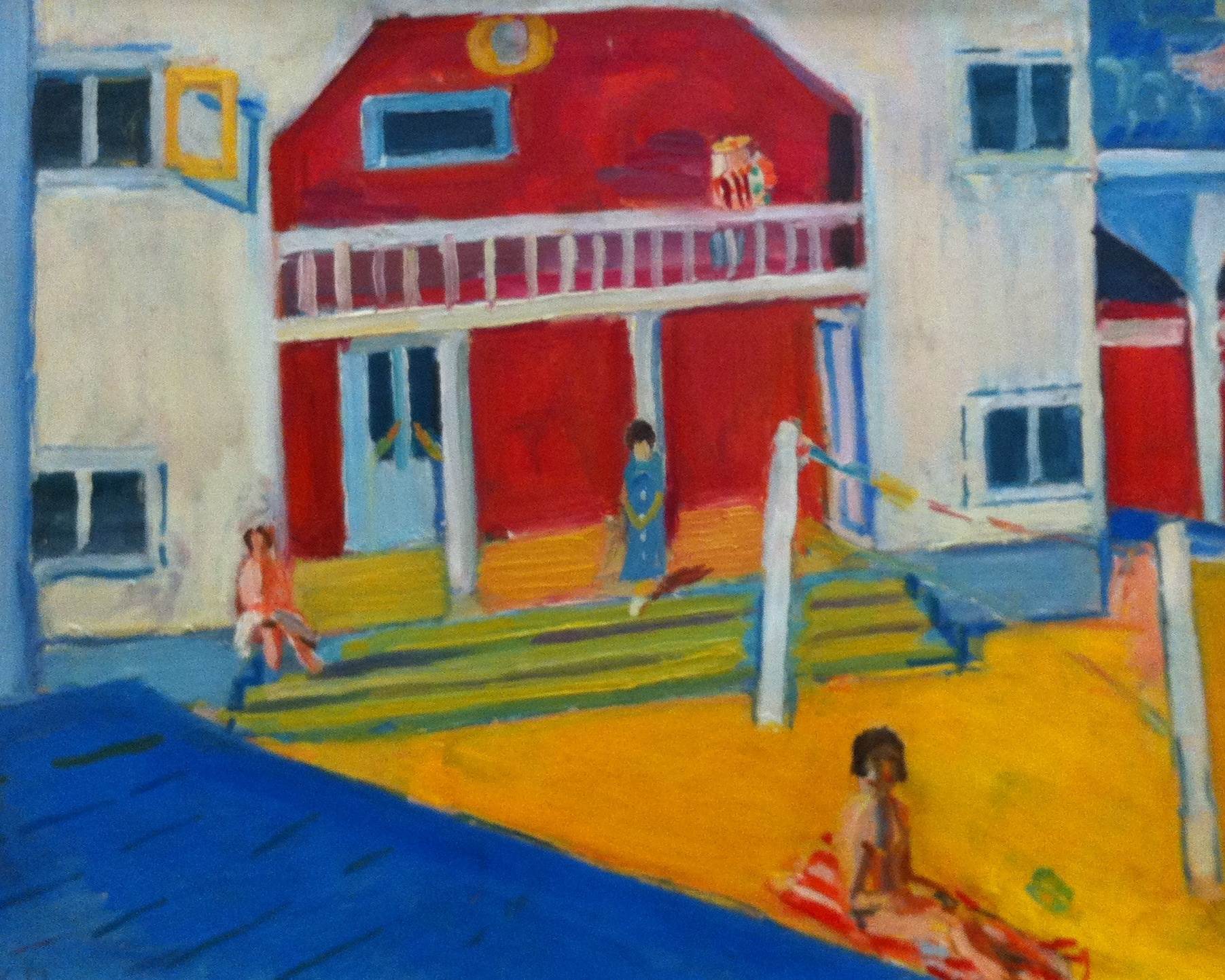
In the Park

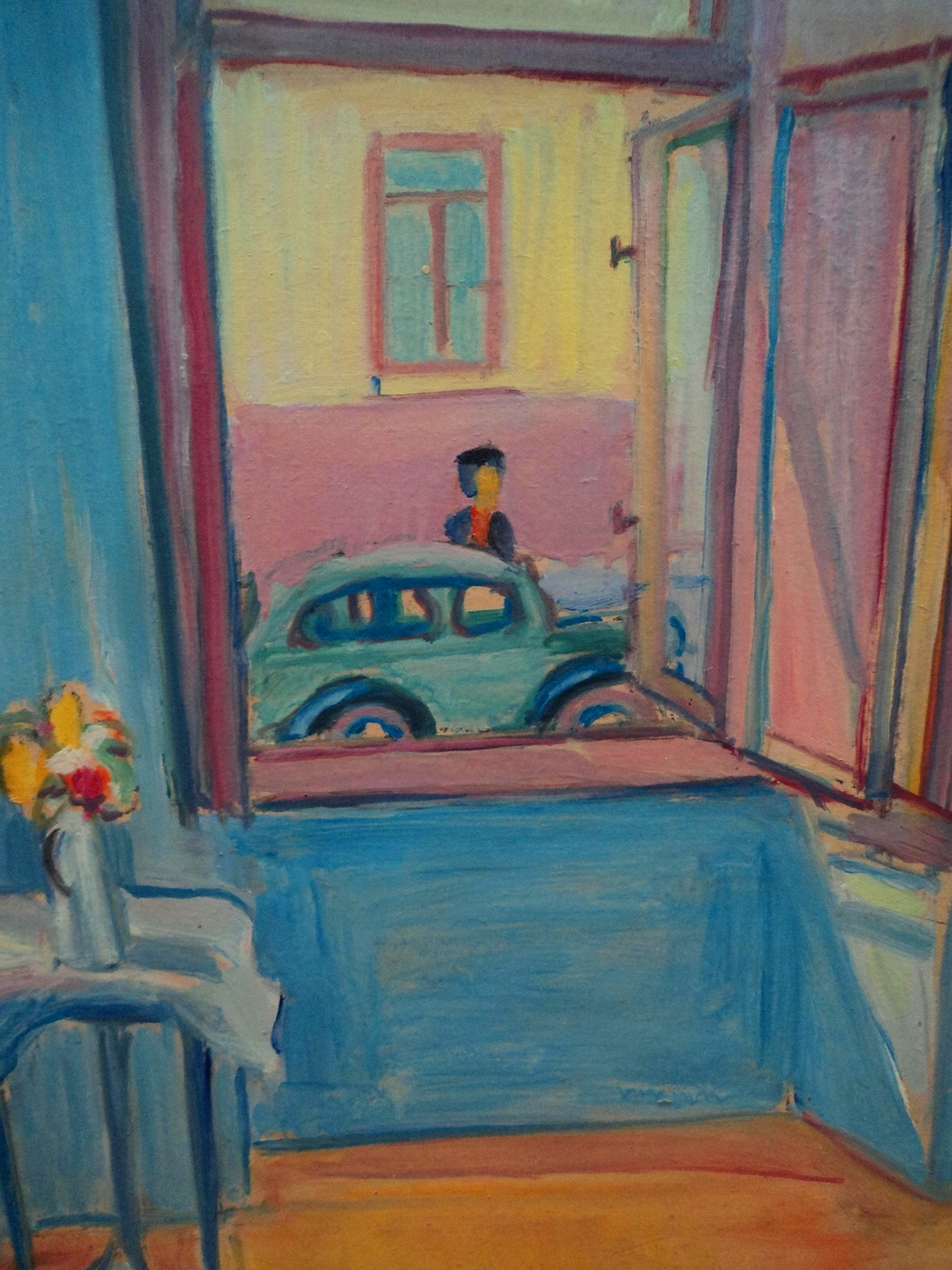
Interior

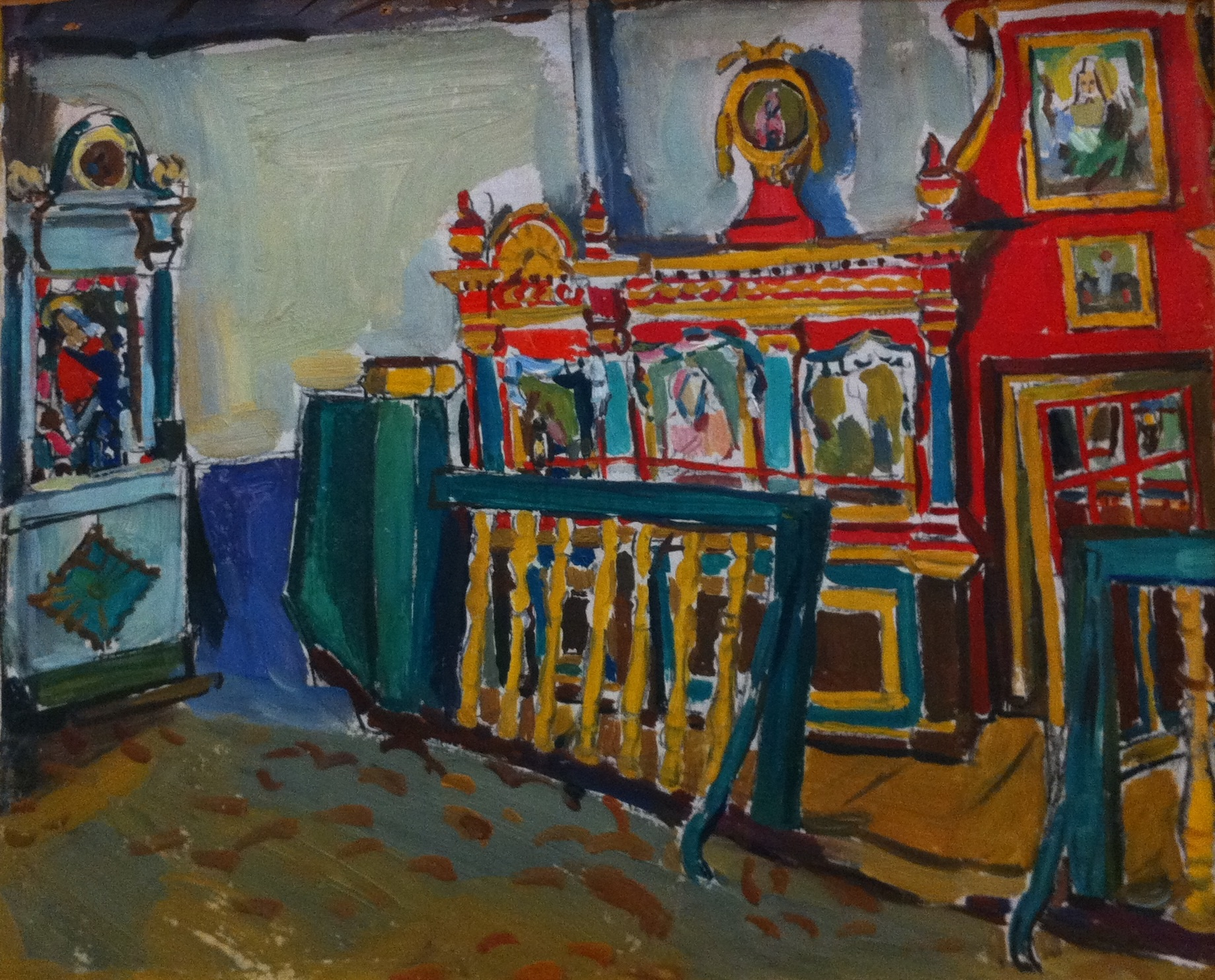
Interior

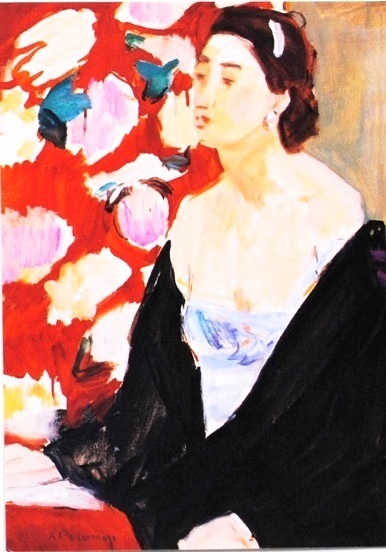
Japanese Woman

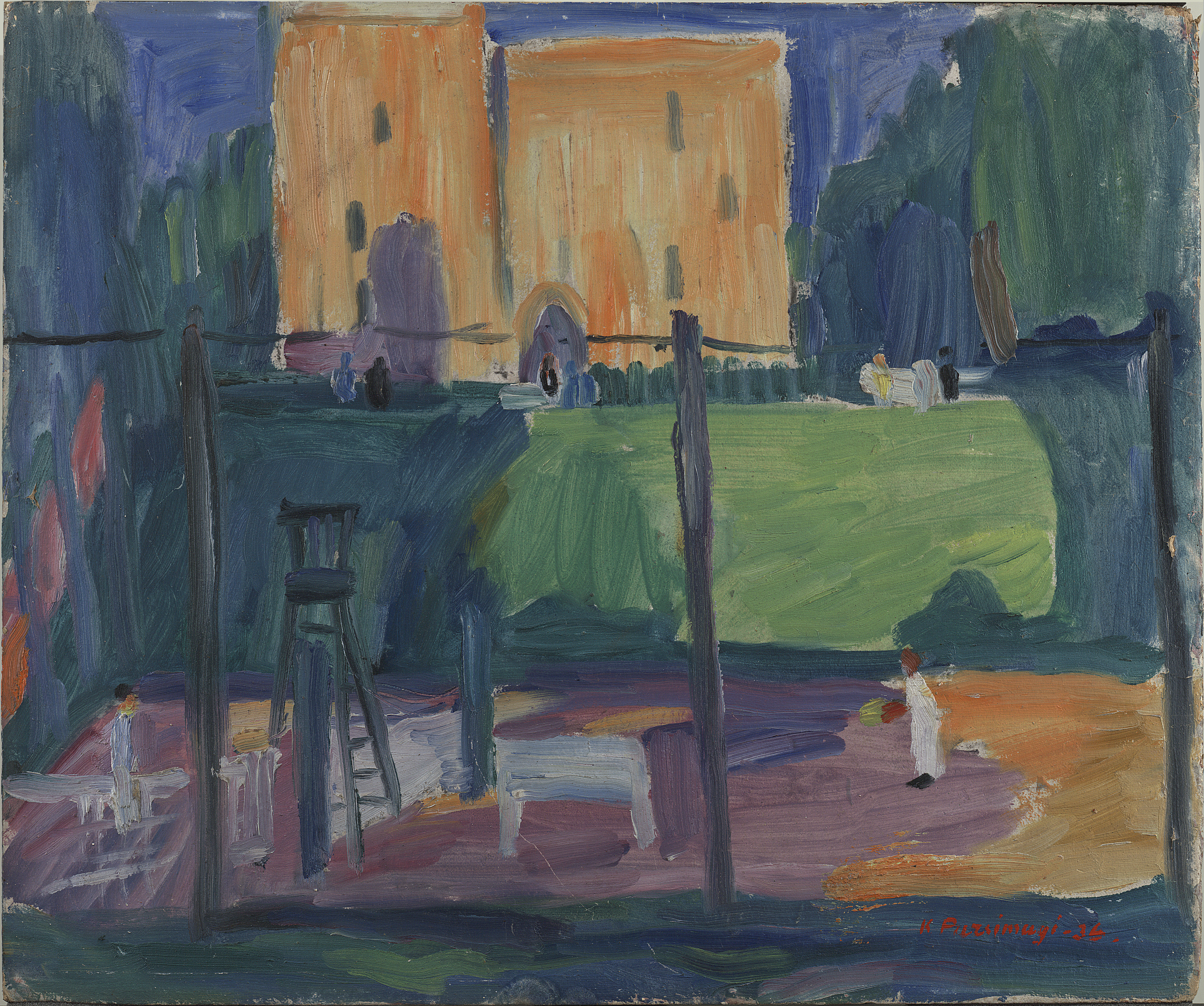
Toomemäe motif
