= Johannes Võerahansu =

Estonian painter

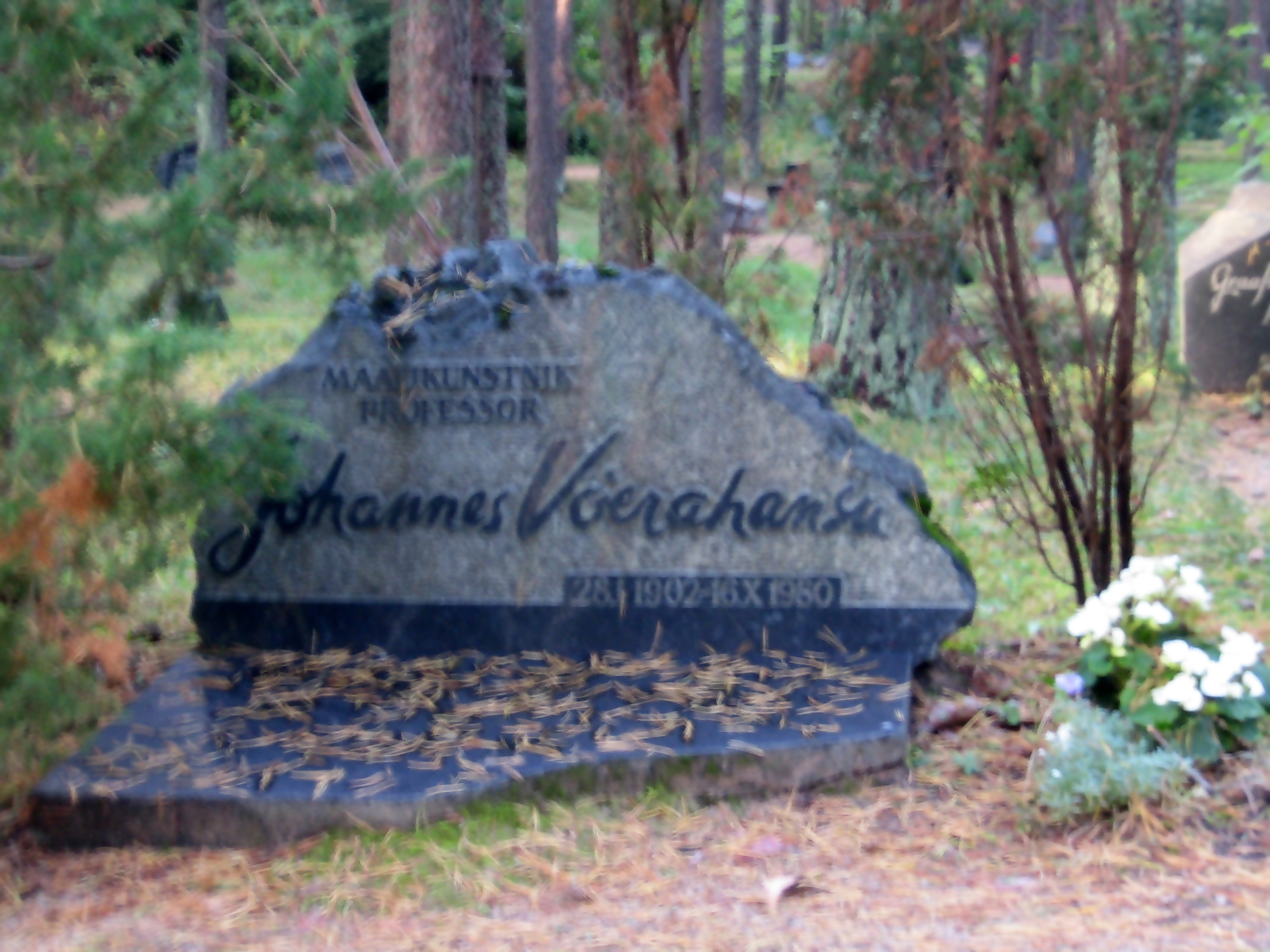
Grave of Johannes Võerahansu

Johannes Võerahansu (28 January 1902 in Keo – 17 October 1980 in Tallinn) was an Estonian painter.

From 1932 to 1936, he studied at Ado Vabbe's atelier at the Pallas Art School. In the 1940s, he taught at the Tartu State Art Institute. From 1955 to 1957, he taught at the Tartu Art School, and from 1957 to 1973 at the Estonian State Art Institute.

In 1945 he became a member of Estonian Artists' Association. He was also a member of the Estonian Association of Visual Artists (Eesti Kujutavate Kunstnikkude Keskühing, EKKKÜ).
