= Ernst Jõesaar =

Estonian sculptor (1905–1985)

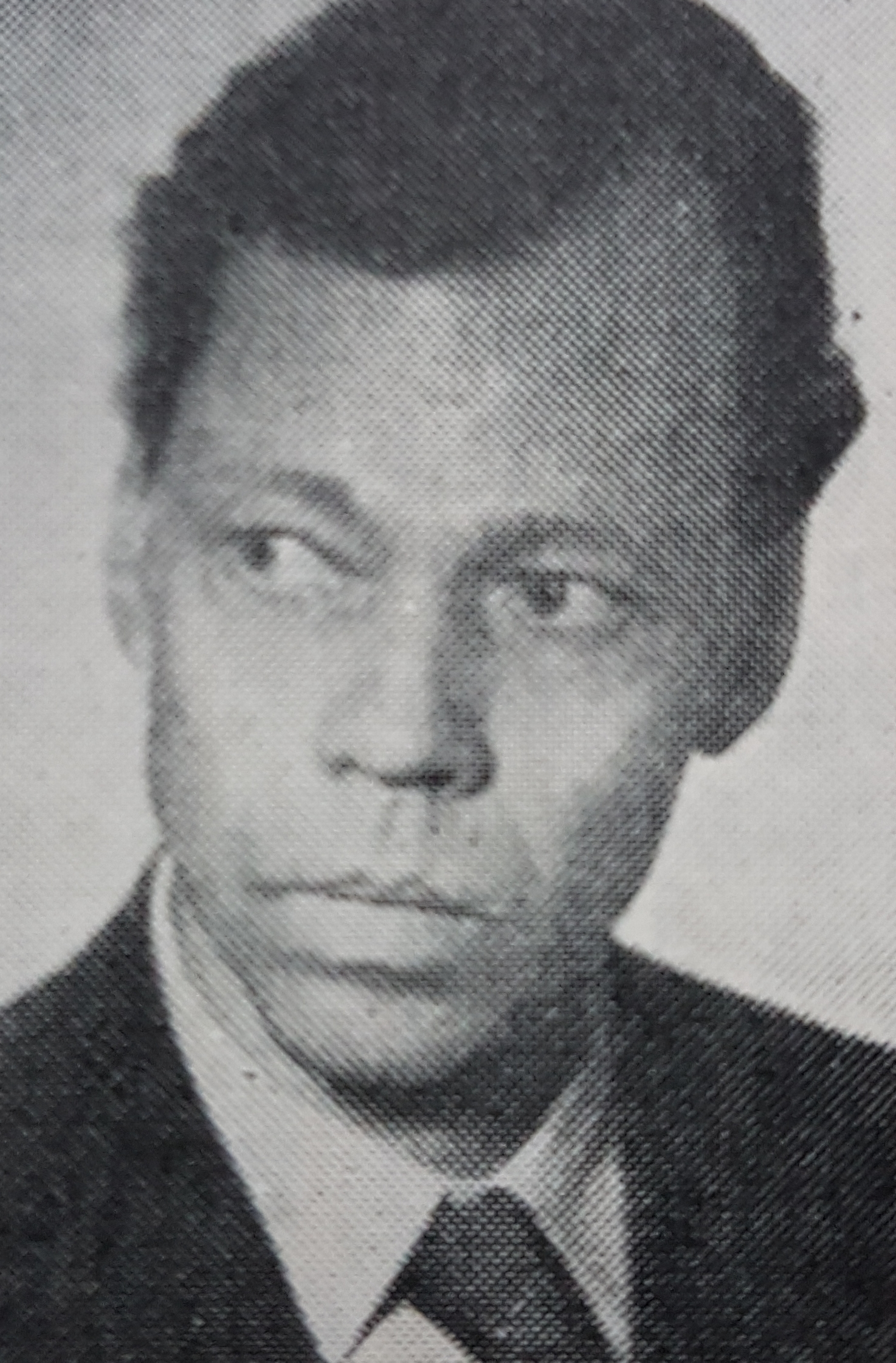
- Born: 18 July 1905; Konguta, Tartu County, Russian Empire
- Died: 10 November 1985 (aged 80); Stockholm, Sweden
- Education: Pallas Art School
- Known for: Sculpture
- Notable work: Agriculture (1937); H. Mugasto (1938); Man and Horse (1939); Remembrance (1968)

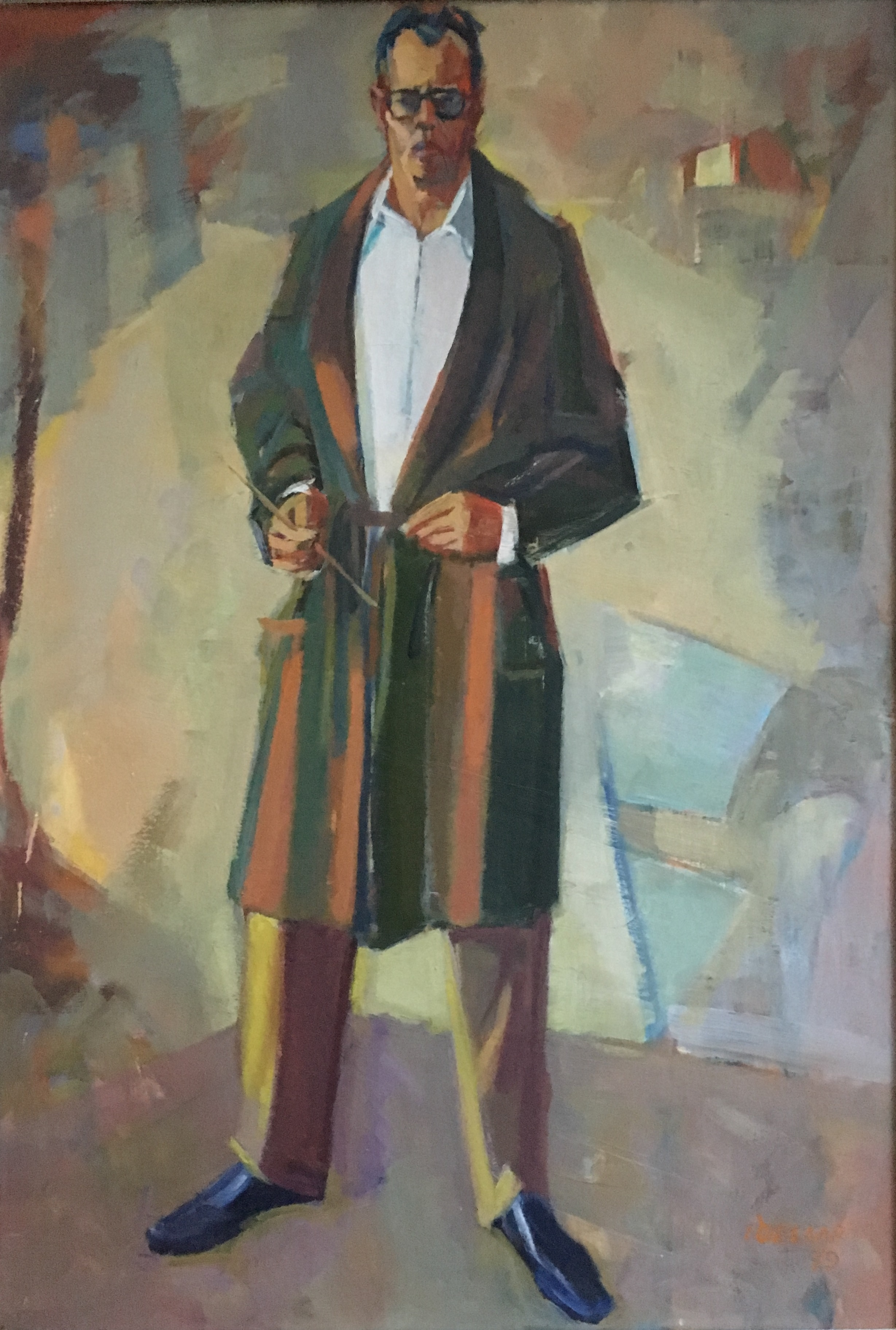
Ernst Jõesaar, self-portrait

Ernst Jõesaar (18 July 1905 – 10 November 1985) was an Estonian sculptor.

== Early life and education ==
Jõesaar was born on 18 July 1905 in Konguta, Tartu County.

In 1933 he graduated from Pallas Art School. In 1944, he escaped to Sweden and started to live in Stockholm.

== Career ==
He was a sculptor.

== Death ==
He died on 10 November 1985 in Stockholm.

== Works ==
- 1937: figurative composition "Agriculture"
- 1938: monument "H. Mugasto"
- 1938: portrait "S. Leitu"
- 1939: portrait "O. Kangilaski"
- 1939: figurative composition "Man and Horse"
- 1968: relief "Remembrance"
