= Oe, Estonia =

Village in Estonia

Oe
- Village
- Location in Estonia
- Coordinates: 57°48′03″N 26°31′59″E
- Country: Estonia
- County: Võru County
- Municipality: Antsla Parish

Population (2011)
  - Total: 73

Oe is a village in Antsla Parish, Võru County in southeastern Estonia. At the end of 2011 the population was 73 inhabitants.

The writer Bernard Kangro (1910–1994) and the painter Karl Pärsimägi (1902–1942) were born in Oe.
