= Soomustüdruk =

1932 novel by Leida Kibuvits

- Author: Leida Kibuvits
- Language: Estonian
- Publication date: 1932
- Publication place: Estonia

Soomustüdruk is a novel by Estonian author Leida Kibuvits, first published in 1932.
