= Salme Rosalie Riig =

Estonian sculptor and printmaker (1903–1973)

- Born: August 12, 1903; Pärnu, Estonia
- Died: September 5, 1973 (aged 70); Palo Alto, California
- Education: University of Tartu, Pallas Art School
- Occupations: Sculptor and printmaker

Salme Rosalie Riig (also Riig-Schönberg and Riig-Reiman; August 12, 1903 – September 5, 1973) was an Estonian sculptor and printmaker.

== Early life and education ==
Riig was born in Pärnu, the daughter of Johan Riig (1871–?) and Ann Riig (née Karvand, 1879–1958). She graduated from Pärnu Girls' High School in 1922 and the Szczecin Home Economics School in 1924, after which she worked as a home economics teacher in Tartu. In 1934, she graduated from the University of Tartu as an art historian, and in 1943 from the sculpture department of the Pallas Art School, where she studied printmaking under Ado Vabbe and sculpture under Anton Starkopf.

== Career ==
Riig started showing her works at art exhibitions in 1939. Small active figures and innovative wall panels characterized her work in the second half of the 1930s. Riig fled Estonia in 1944. She settled first in Sweden, then relocated to Argentina in 1946 and to the United States in 1968. She continued to work as an artist in Argentina as well, where she received the 1951 Salón National Prize for foreigners and the 1957 Buenos Aires Salón Municipal Rogelio Yrurtia Prize. She portrayed mythological and biblical themes in her work.

== Family ==
Riig was married twice: to Eduard Heinrich Schönberg-Paenast (1885–1944) and to Mihkel Reiman (1904–1968).
