= Paraphrase E =

1914 painting by Ado Vabbe

Coordinates: 58.3808°N 26.7242°E

- Parafraas E (Estonian)
- (image viewable via museum record)
- Artist: Ado Vabbe
- Year: 1914
- Type: pastel on paper
- Dimensions: 30.5 cm × 37.5 cm (12.0 in × 14.8 in)
- Location: Tartu Art Museum, Tartu

Paraphrase E (Estonian: Parafraas E) is one of a series of avant-garde drawings called paraphrases by Ado Vabbe in the Tartu Art Museum.

The drawing shows a set of lines that act as partial contours of possible images, such as faces and the rear end of a horse. Ado Vabbe was the first to bring abstraction to Estonia after studying with Vassily Kandinsky and Franz Marc in Munich from 1911 to 1923. The German Expressionist Group Der Blaue Reiter had a great influence on his own work, and his "paraphrases" influenced young artists in Estonia.
