= Lennuk (Triik) =

1910 painting by Nikolai Triik

- Lennuk (Estonian)
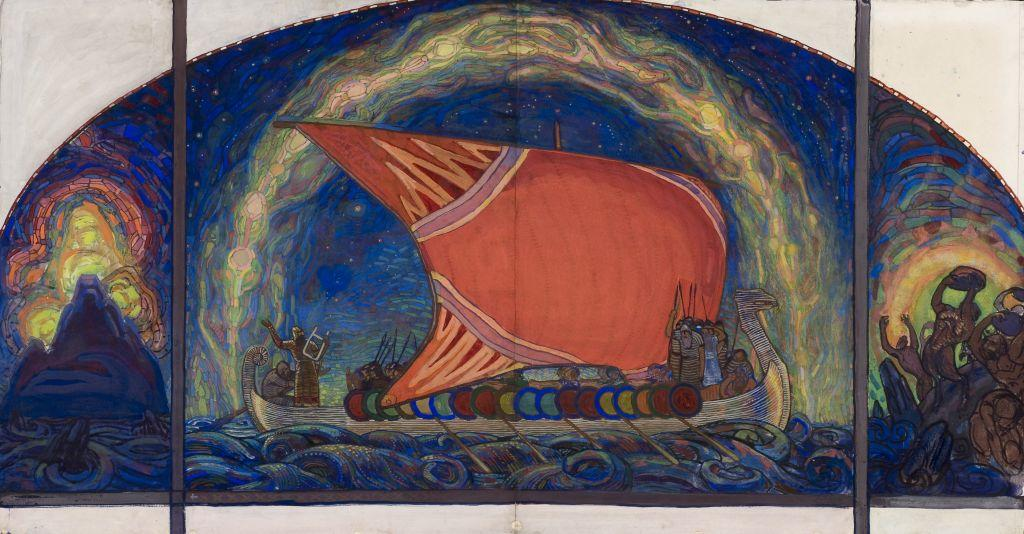
- Artist: Nikolai Triik
- Year: 1910
- Medium: tempera and pastel on paper
- Subject: Lennuk, the ship of Kalevipoeg
- Dimensions: 73.8 cm × 137 cm (29.1 in × 54 in)
- Location: Kumu Art Museum; Tallinn
- Owner: Art Museum of Estonia

Lennuk is a painting by Nikolai Triik of 1910, depicting Lennuk, the ship of Kalevipoeg, son of Kaleva, from the Estonian national epic Kalevipoeg.

The work measures 73.8 cm by 137 cm and is painted in tempera and pastel on paper.

It is part of the collection of the Art Museum of Estonia and is exhibited in the Kumu Art Museum in Tallinn.
