= Leida Kibuvits =

Estonian writer

Leida Kibuvits (née Kupits; 18 October 1907 Kurepalu, Tartu County – 5 December 1976 Tallinn) was an Estonian writer.

From 1922 to 1924, she studied at Pallas Art School, being a student of Konrad Mägi. After graduating, she worked as a pharmacist assistant, later as a printer and from 1929, she worked as a typist at the Ministry of Defence. From 1933 to 1944, she was a professional writer.

From 1938, she was a member of the Estonian Writers' Union.

In 1950, she was deported to Solikamsk in Siberia; she was accused of anti-Soviet activities during the German occupation of Estonia during World War II. In 1954, she was able to return to Estonia.

In 1931, she married lieutenant August Kibuvits (1904–1967). In 1948, she married communist Leo Aisenstadt (1912–1975).

She died in 1976 and is buried at Metsakalmistu Cemetery.

== Selected works ==
- 1932: novel Soomustüdruk ('Armored Girl')
- 1936: novel Kass arvab, et ... ('The Cat Thinks That ...')
- 1940: short story Väike kivi ('Small Stone')
