= Kristjan Raud Art Award =

Estonian art prize

The Kristjan Raud Art Award (Estonian: Kristjan Raua kunstipreemia) is an Estonian art award that was established in 1973. It is the oldest art award in Estonia. The award is given out annually by the Estonian Artists' Association and Tallinn City Government. The award can be given to artists, art historians, creative collectives, art projects, or an art event.

== Recipients ==
- 1973: Ilmar Kimm, Enn Põldroos, Riho Kuld, Salme Raunam
- ...
- 1976: Lepo Mikko
- ...
- 1984: Alo Hoidre
- ...
- 1991: Alo Hoidre, Ekke Väli
- 1992: Ahti Seppet
- ...
- 2010: Tiiu Kirsipuu
- ...
- 2020: Anu Hint, Juta Keevallik, Jaan Toomik, Anne Türn
- ...
- 2025: Leida Ilo, Urmas Lüüs, Raul Meel, Jevgeni Zolotko
- 2026: Helle Videvik, Jüri Kask, Marko Kekišev, Neeme Külm
