= Elmar Kits =

Estonian painter

- Born: 27 April 1913; Tartu, Governorate of Livonia, Russian Empire
- Died: 24 March 1972 (aged 58); Tartu, then part of Estonian SSR, Soviet Union
- Education: Pallas Art School
- Known for: Painting, drawing
- Notable work: Linnaümbrus (1942)

Elmar Kits (27 April [O.S. 14 April] 1913 – 24 March 1972) was an Estonian painter. He was a People's Artist of the Estonian Soviet Socialist Republic, and he won the State Prize of the Estonian SSR for his 1969 portrait of Vladimir Lenin. Other paintings include The Trio (1964), Young Scientists (1967), Old Man Talking (1968), and Builders (1969).
