= Hando Mugasto =

Estonian painter

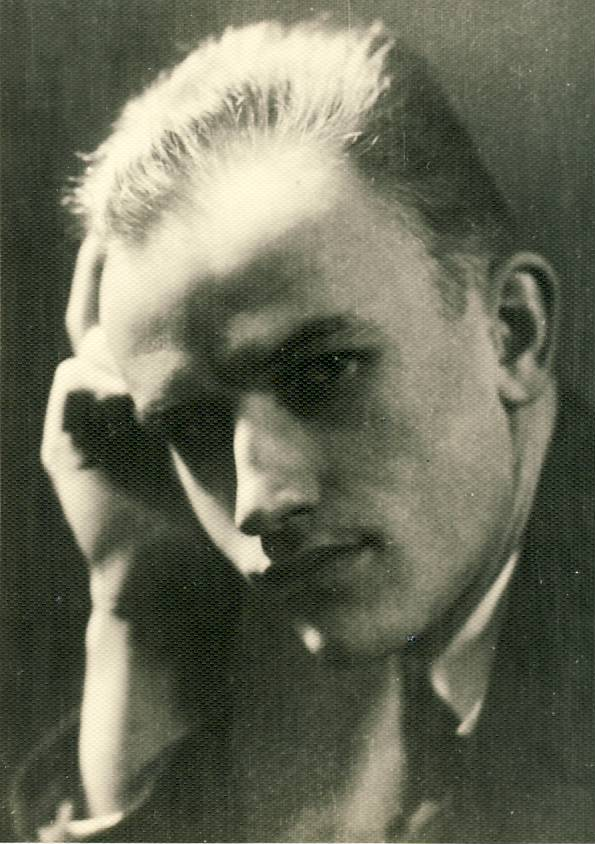
Hando Mugasto

Hando Mugasto (until 1925 Heinrich-Voldemar Monstrum; 18 January 1907 Rakvere – 11 June 1937 Tartu) was an Estonian neorealist printmaker.

From 1924 to 1933 he studied at the Pallas Art School. From 1935 to 1937 he taught at this school.

== Gallery ==
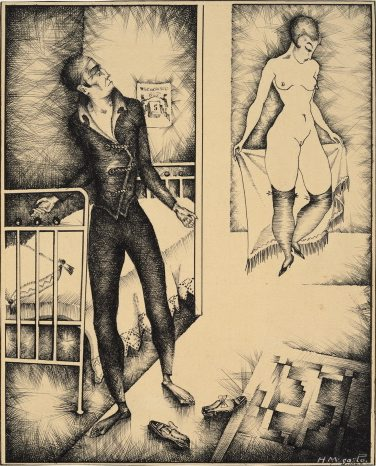
Brothel (1927)

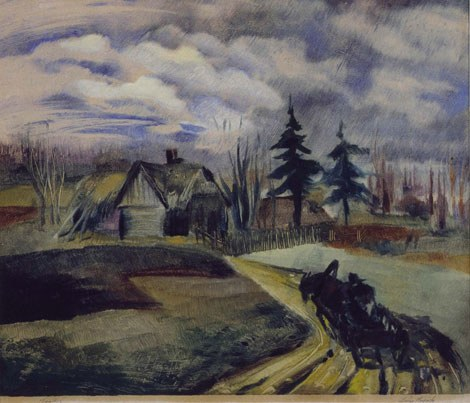
Landscape (1929)

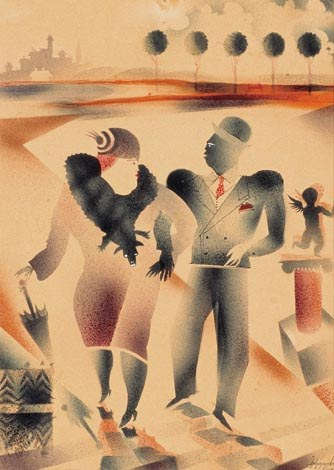
Stroll (1928)

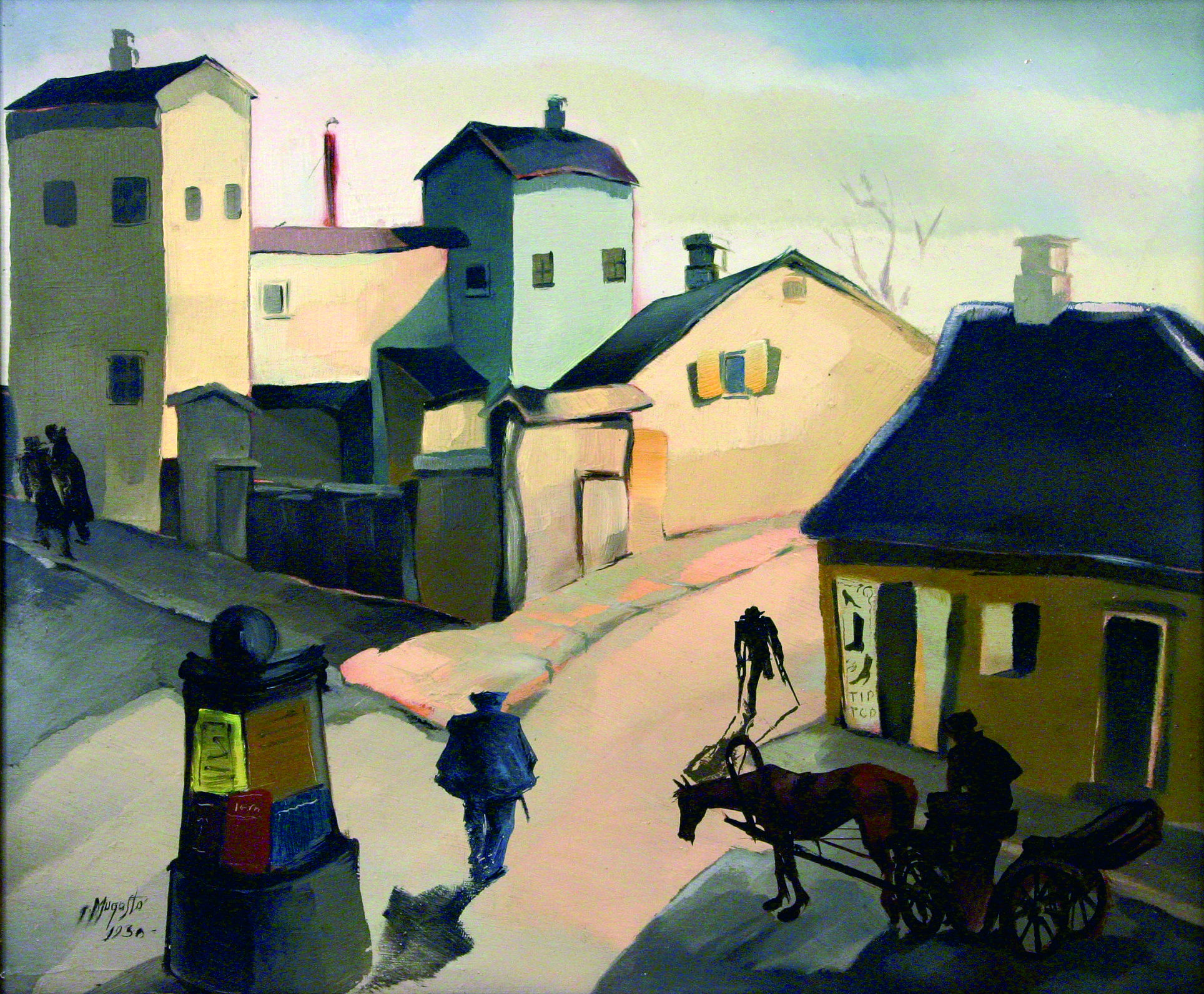
City View (1930)

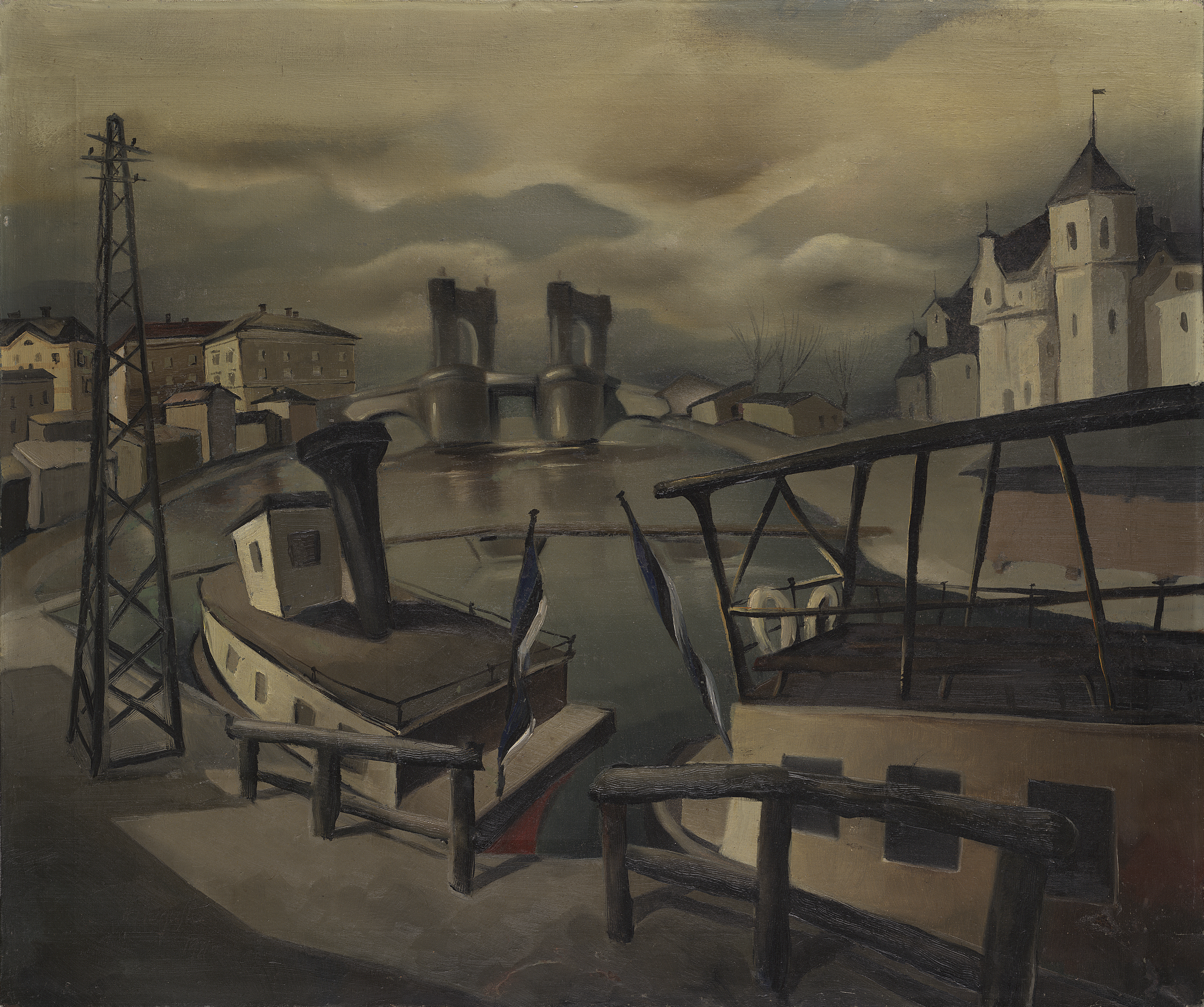
Stone Bridge in Tartu (1931)

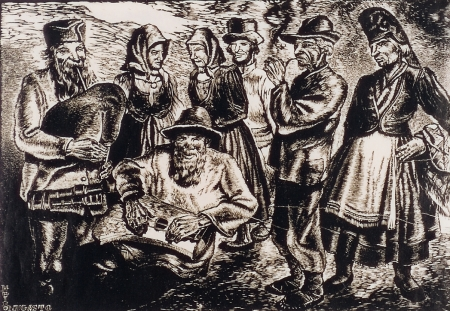
Musicians (c. 1932)

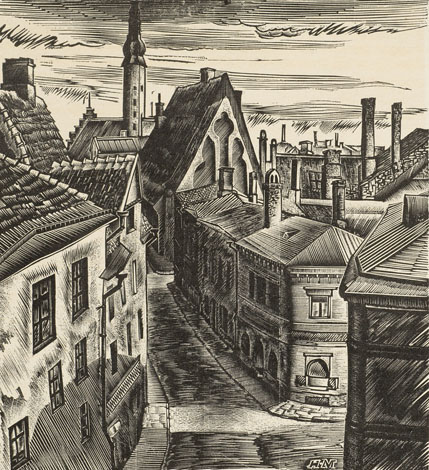
Old Tallinn (1935)

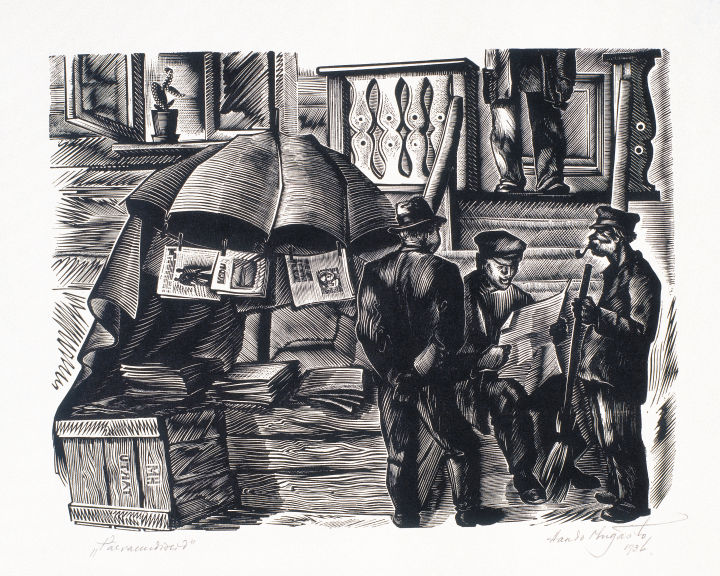
Daily News (1936)
