= Pallas Art School (1919–1940) =

Art school in Estonia, Tartu

- Active: 1919–1940
- Location: Tartu, Estonia; 58°22′35″N 26°43′37″E

Pallas Art School (Estonian: Kõrgem Kunstikool Pallas) was an Estonian art school which existed from 1919 to 1944 in Tartu. The school was the first Estonian art school that offered higher education in art.

The school was established in 1919 by the Pallas Art Society. Key persons in its establishment were Konrad Mägi, Aleksander Tassa, Ado Vabbe, Johannes Einsild, and Anton Starkopf. The school offered courses in painting, graphics, and sculpture.

The building was destroyed in a fire during street battles of the Soviet Tartu Offensive on 26 August 1944.

After the fire, surviving items from the basement (supplies and ovens) were taken to the Ugala premises, where the Tartu State Art Institute was established and operated from 1944 to 1951, when it merged with the State Art Institute of the Estonian SSR in Tallinn.

== Notable alumni ==
- Ellinor Aiki (1893–1969), painter
- Alo Hoidre (1916–1993), painter
- Ernst Jõesaar (1905–1985), sculptor
- Ott Kangilaski (1911–1975), printmaker
- Raoul Kernumees (1905–1990), printmaker and painter
- Leida Kibuvits (1907–1976), writer
- Elmar Kits (1913–1972), painter
- Erich Leps (1901–1965), painter
- Pauline Elfriede Leps-Estam (1903–2002), printmaker
- Kaarel Liimand (1906–1941), painter
- Karin Luts (1904–1993), painter
- Hando Mugasto (1907–1937), printmaker
- Karl Pärsimägi (1902–1942), painter
- Salme Rosalie Riig (1903–1973), sculptor and printmaker
- Enn Roos (1908–1990), sculptor
- Erika Siilivask (1902–1993), pedagogue
- Kristjan Teder (1901–1960), painter
- Aleksander Vardi (1901–1983), painter
- Agaate Veeber (1901–1988), graphic artist
- Kuno Veeber (1898–1929), painter and graphic artist
- Johannes Võerahansu (1902–1980), painter
- Eduard Wiiralt (1898–1954), graphic artist
