= Pärnu Museum =

Museum in Pärnu, Estonia

- Pärnu Muuseum
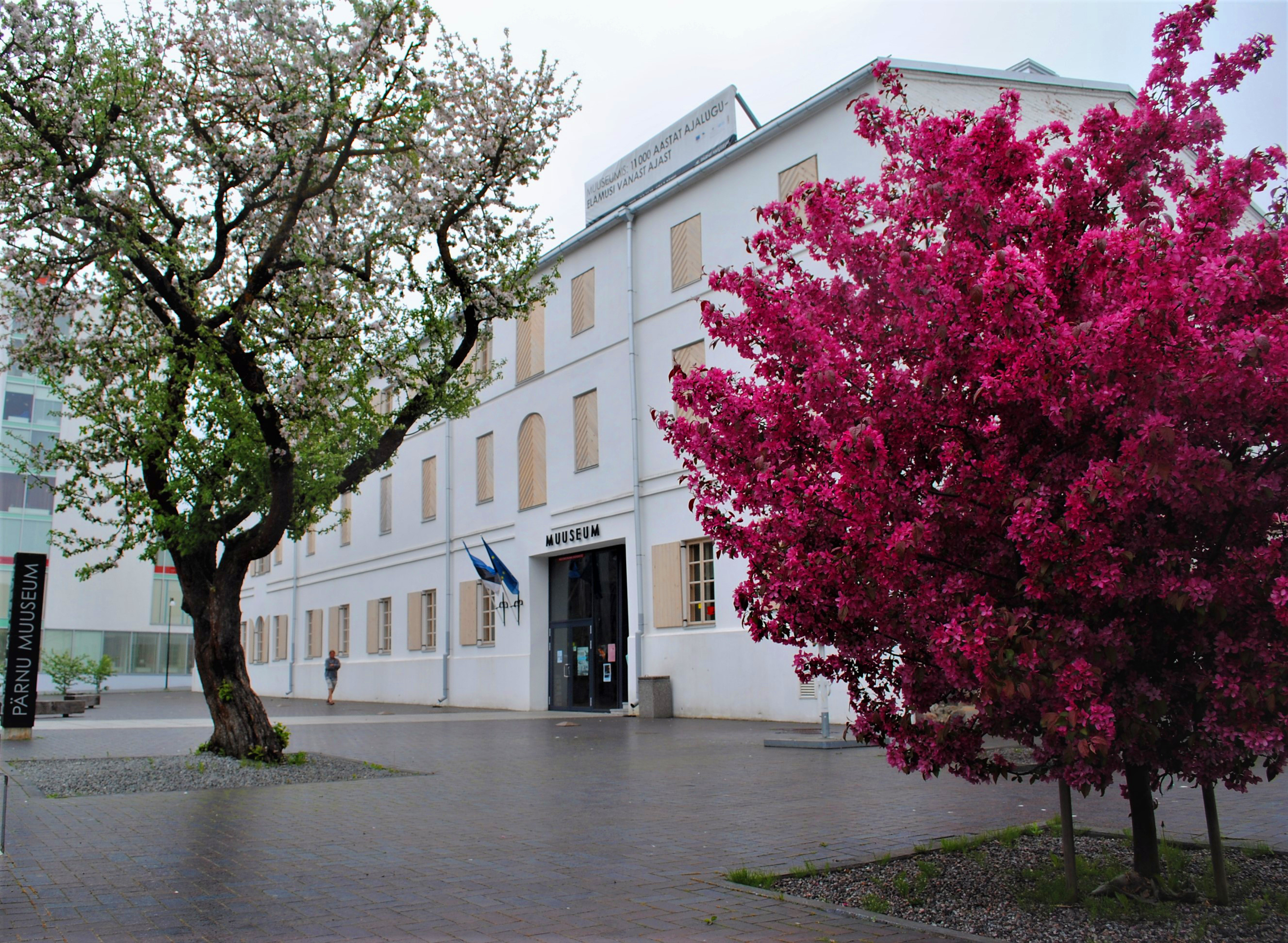
- The Pärnu Museum
- Established: 1896
- Location: Aida 3, Pärnu, 80010 Pärnu maakond, Estonia
- Coordinates: 58°23′12″N 24°29′58″E
- Website: www.parnumuuseum.ee

The Pärnu Museum (Estonian: Pärnu muuseum) is a county museum in Pärnu, Estonia.

The museum was found by Pernauer Alterthumforschende Gesellschaft ('Society of Archaeology'; established in 1896). On that time, the museum's goals were to study, present and preserve local history. In 1909, the museum was moved to the building at the address Elevandi Street (Now named Akadeemia street) 7.

In September 1944, the building burned down. The collections were severely damaged. In 1944, the museum moved to the building at the address Aia Street 4.

Nowadays, the museum is located at Aida Street 3.

The Pärnu Museum has a branch (the Lydia Koidula Memorial Museum), which is located at Jannseni Street 37. This branch is dedicated to Estonian poet Lydia Koidula.
