= Nikolai Triik =

Estonian artist

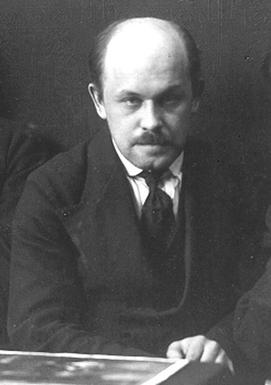
Nikolai Triik, from Estonica (date unknown)

Nikolai Voldemar Triik (7 August 1884, Tallinn – 12 August 1940, Tallinn) was an Estonian Modernist painter, graphic artist, printmaker and professor. His work displays elements of Symbolism and Expressionism.

== Biography ==
He came from a middle-class family. After graduating from the public schools in 1901, he enrolled at the Saint Petersburg Art and Industry Academy, but was expelled for participating in a student strike during the 1905 Revolution. He returned home and continued his studies at the private art school operated by Ants Laikmaa, but later went back to Saint Petersburg to take lessons from Osip Braz.

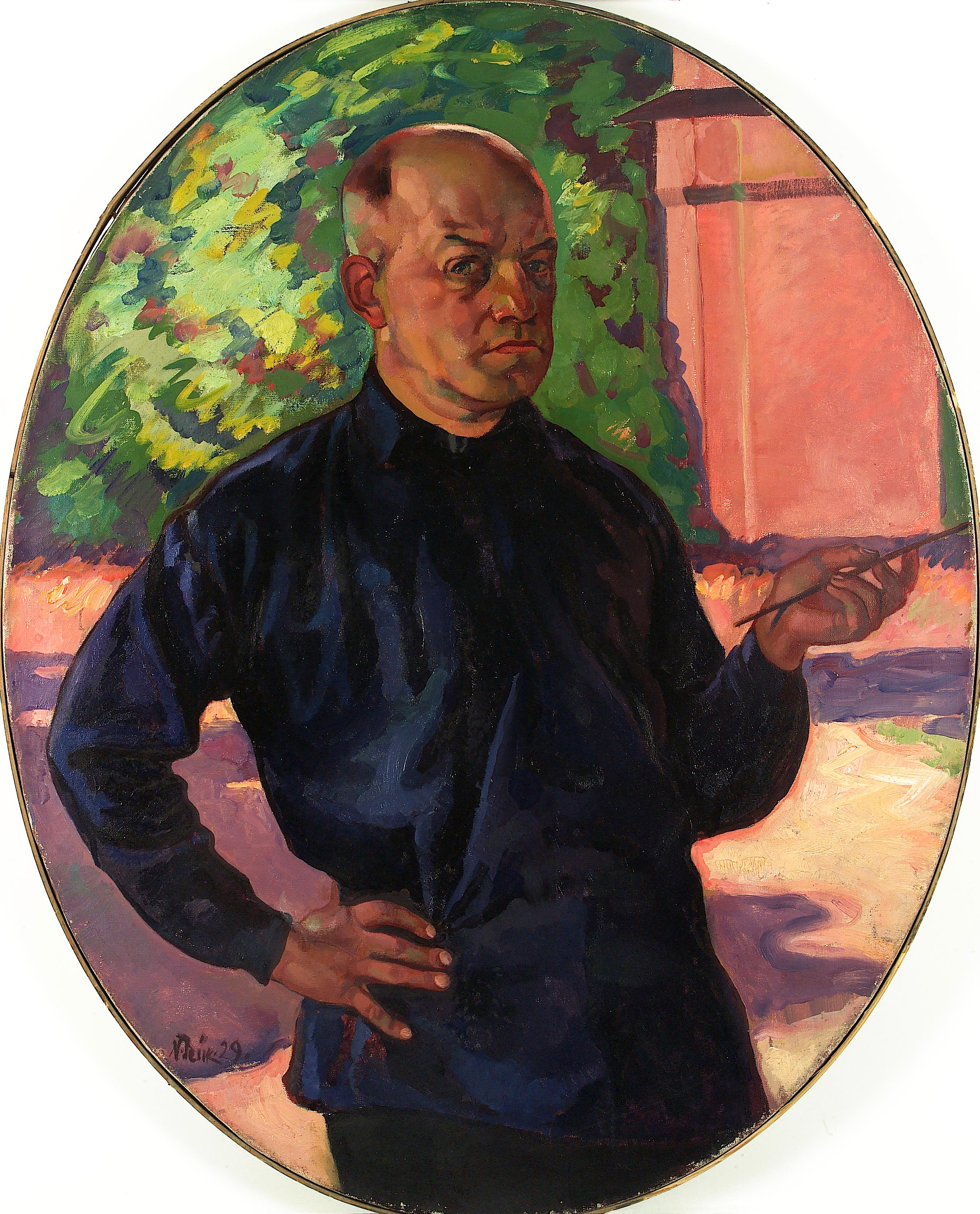
Self-portrait (1929)

The following year, he accompanied Konrad Mägi and Aleksander Tassa on a trip to Åland and spent some time in Helsinki at the school operated by the "Finnish Art Association". Not long after, he married the daughter of a wealthy factory owner and moved to Paris, where he sampled courses at the Académie Colarossi, the Académie Julian and the École des Beaux-arts.

When his studies there were completed, he visited Norway, then went to Saint Petersburg again and audited classes at the art academy operated by Nicholas Roerich. For the next two years, he moved between Saint Petersburg and Tartu. In 1911, he began producing an art section for a magazine published by the literary association, Noor-Eesti (Young Estonia), and created a series of works based on Estonian folklore. Following more travels to Copenhagen and Berlin, he settled in Estonia permanently in 1913, working as an art teacher.

In 1916, he became a member of the governing council of the "Eesti Kunstiselts" (art association) and, from 1919 to 1920, was in charge of Fine Arts at the Estonian Ministry of Education. That year, he joined a progressive art association named "Pallas" and went to Tartu to teach at their school.

From 1922 to 1926, he gave private lessons at his own studio in Tartu, then worked as a freelance artist until 1928. Five years later, he became the first Estonian to be named a Professor of Art. His second wife, Viktoria (the daughter of Mihkel Martna), died in 1935, aged only forty-four. He fell ill early in 1940 and returned to Tallinn, where he died shortly after.

== Selected works ==
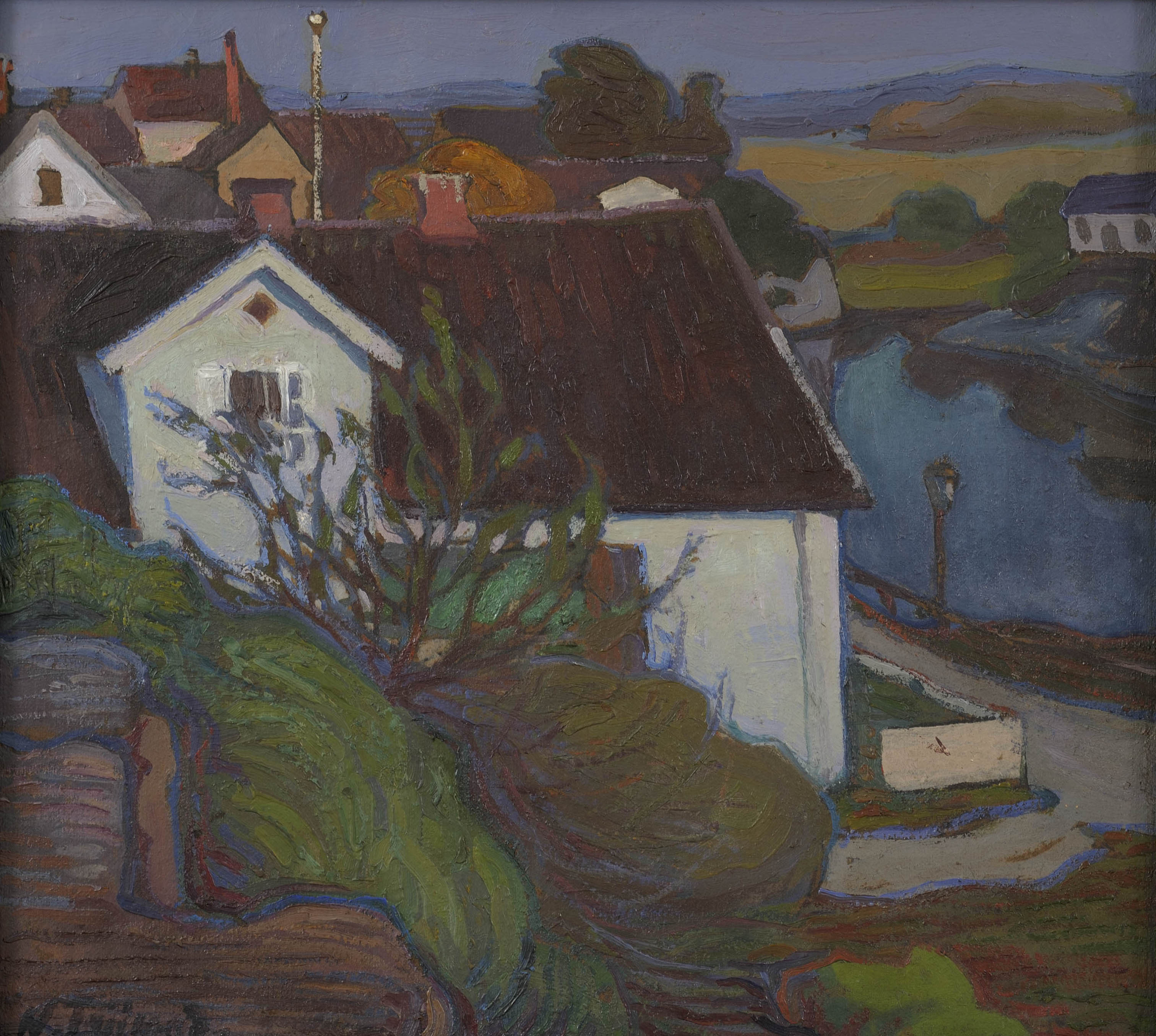
View of a Small Town (1905–1909)

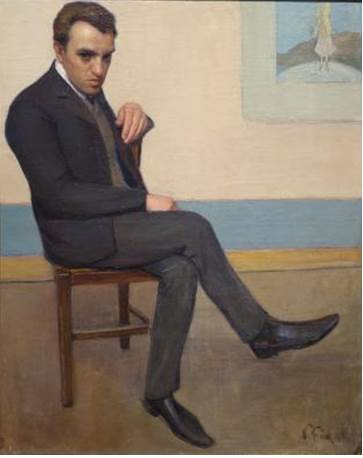
Portrait of Konrad Mägi (1908)

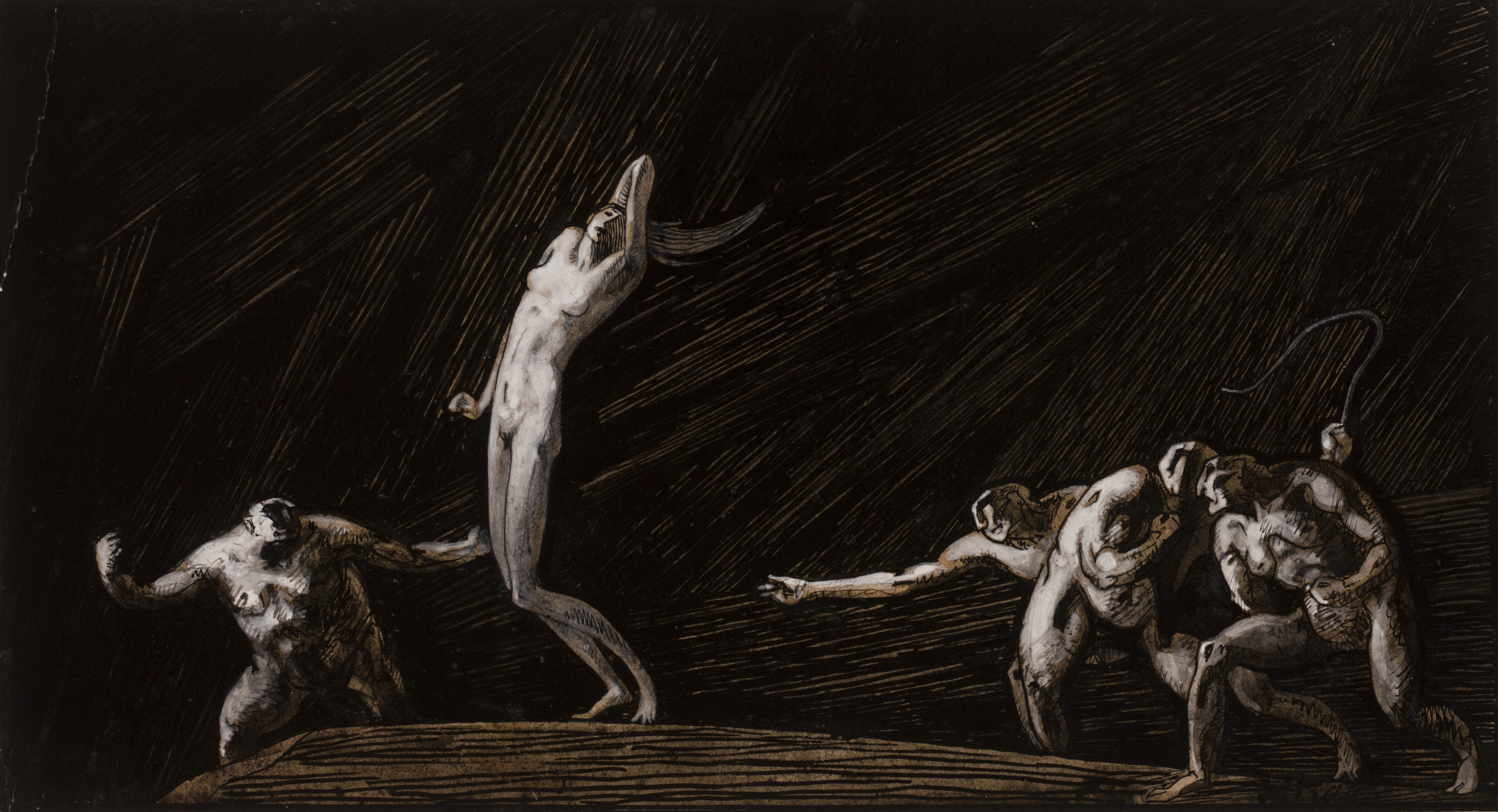
Hunt (1913)

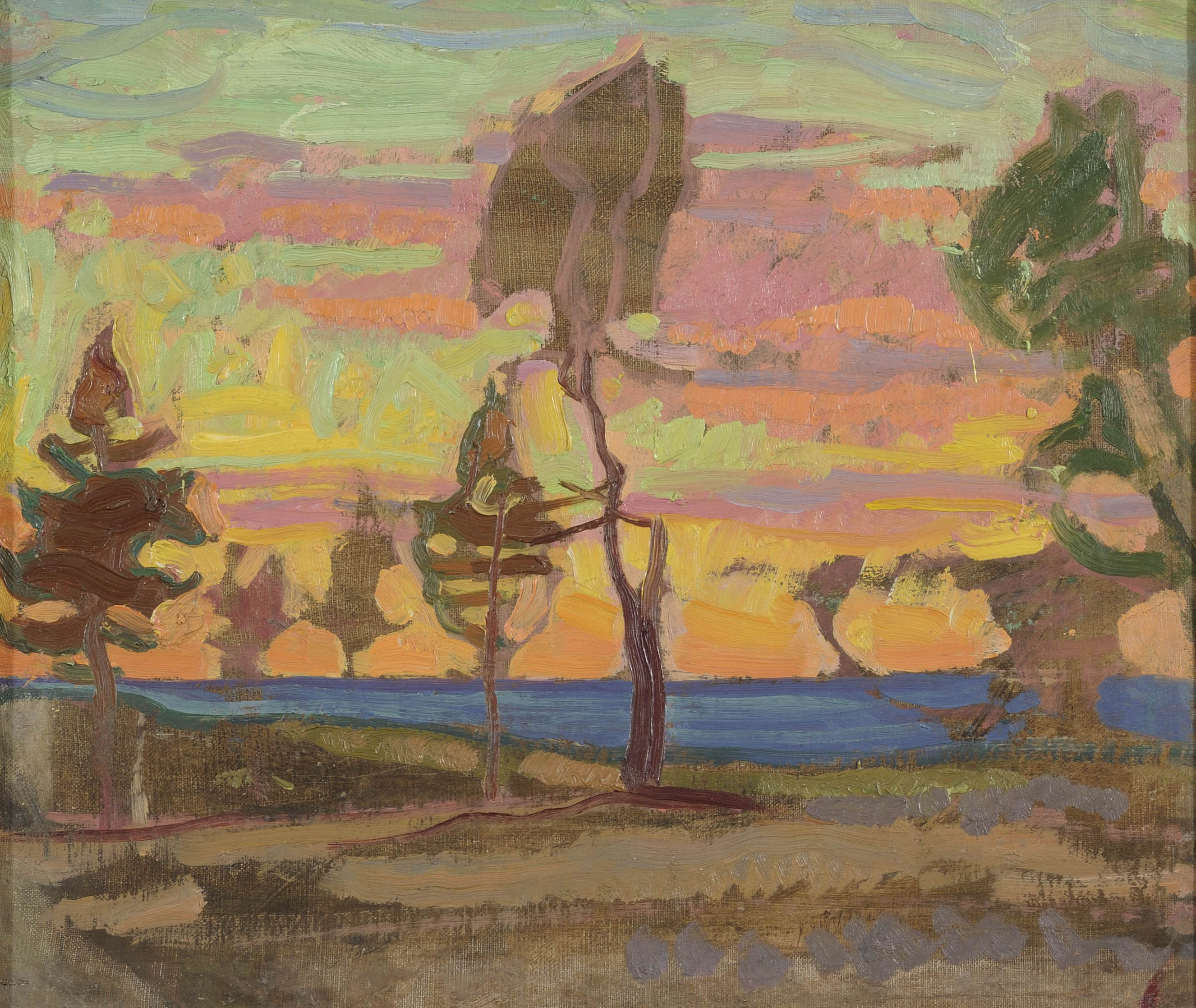
Finnish Landscape (1914)

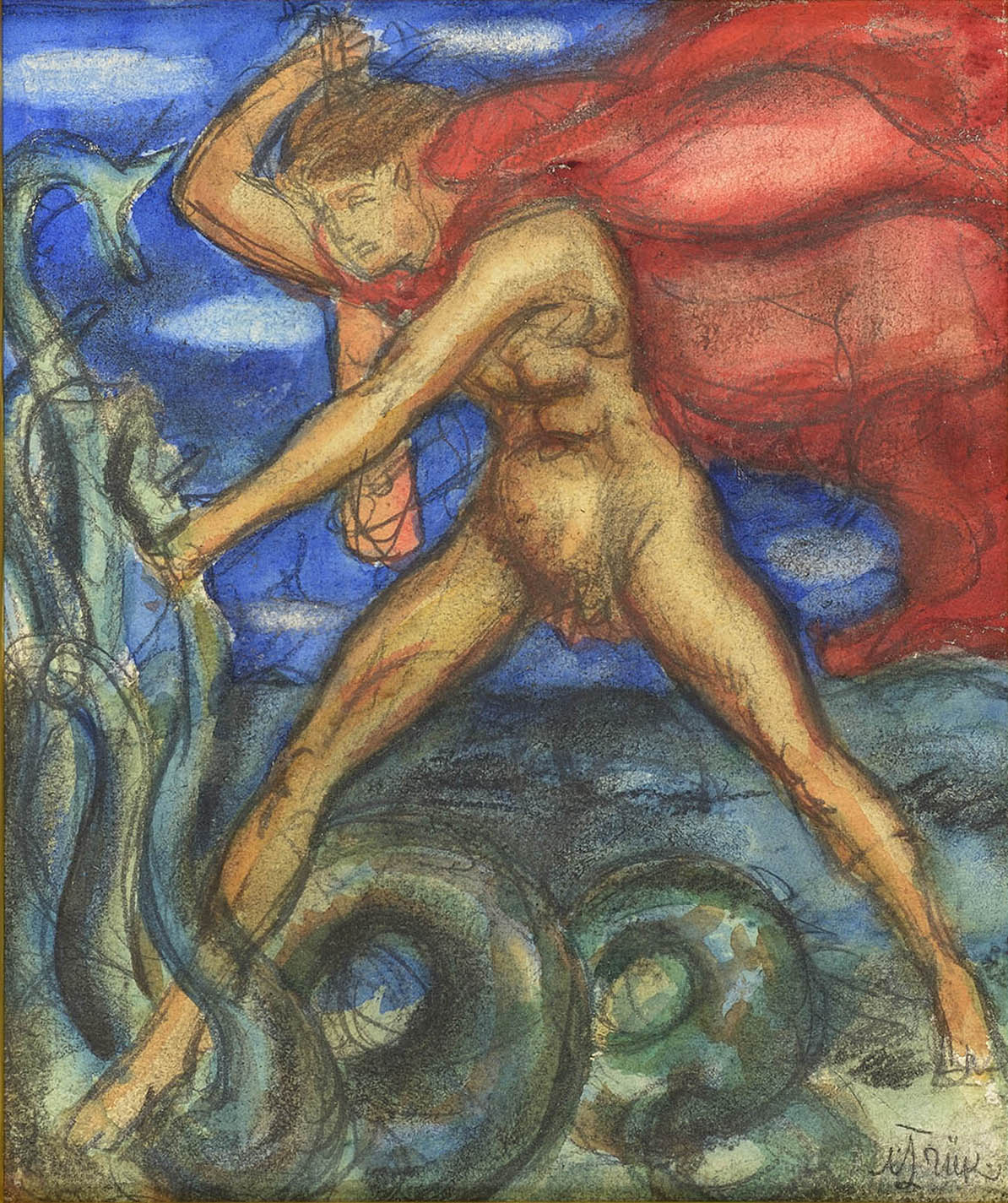
Fight with the Hydra (undated)

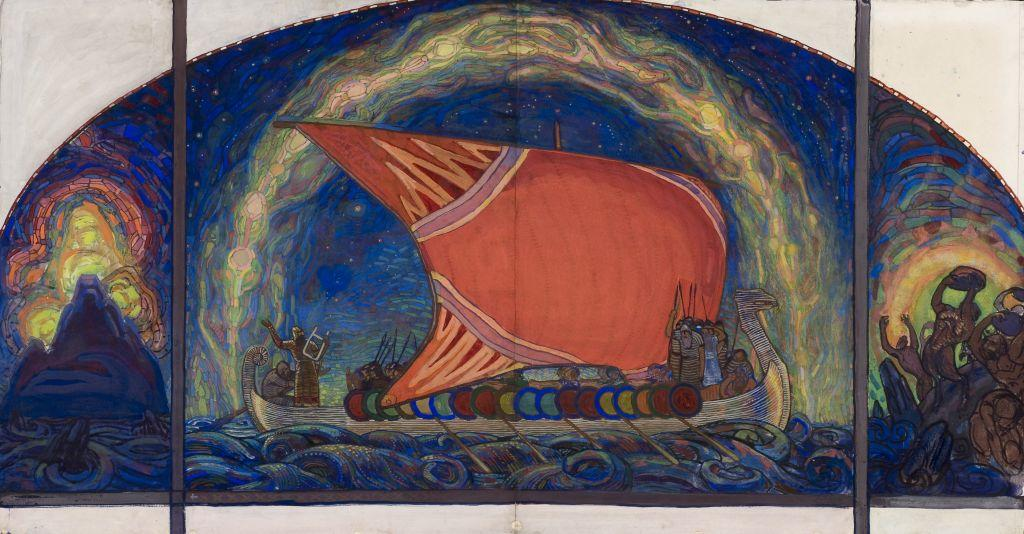
Lennuk (1910)

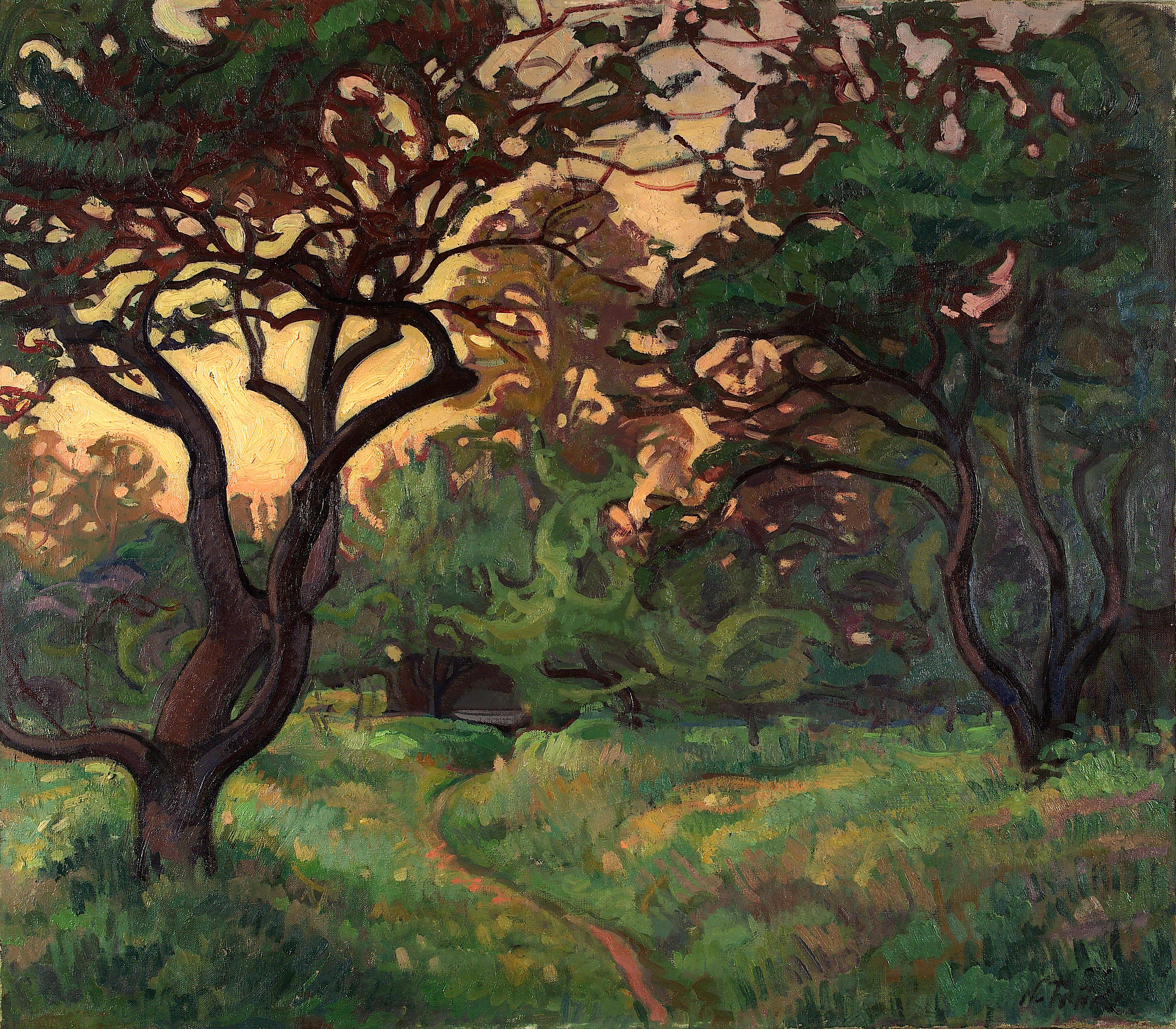
Old Garden (1917)

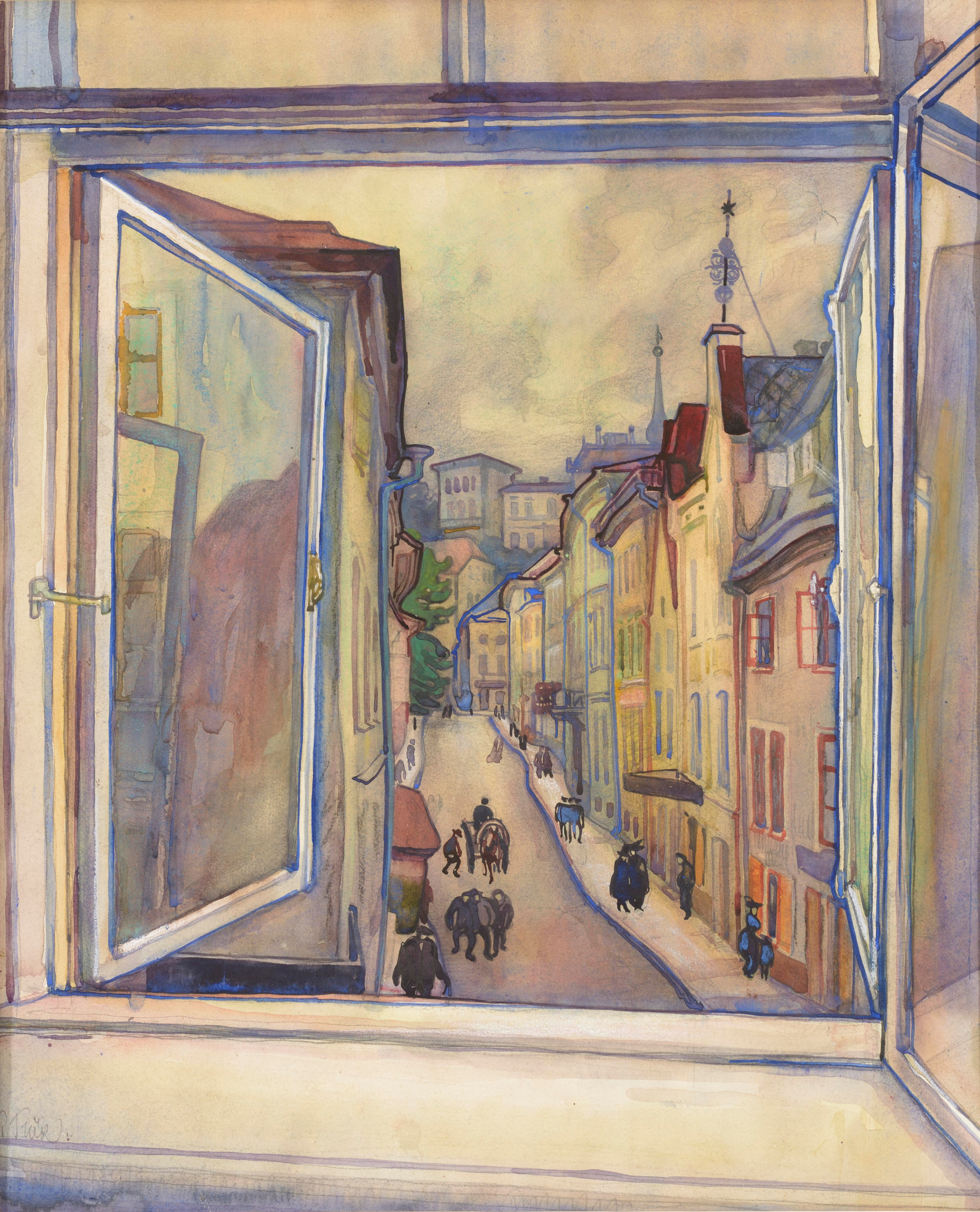
From the Window (Tallinn) (1913)

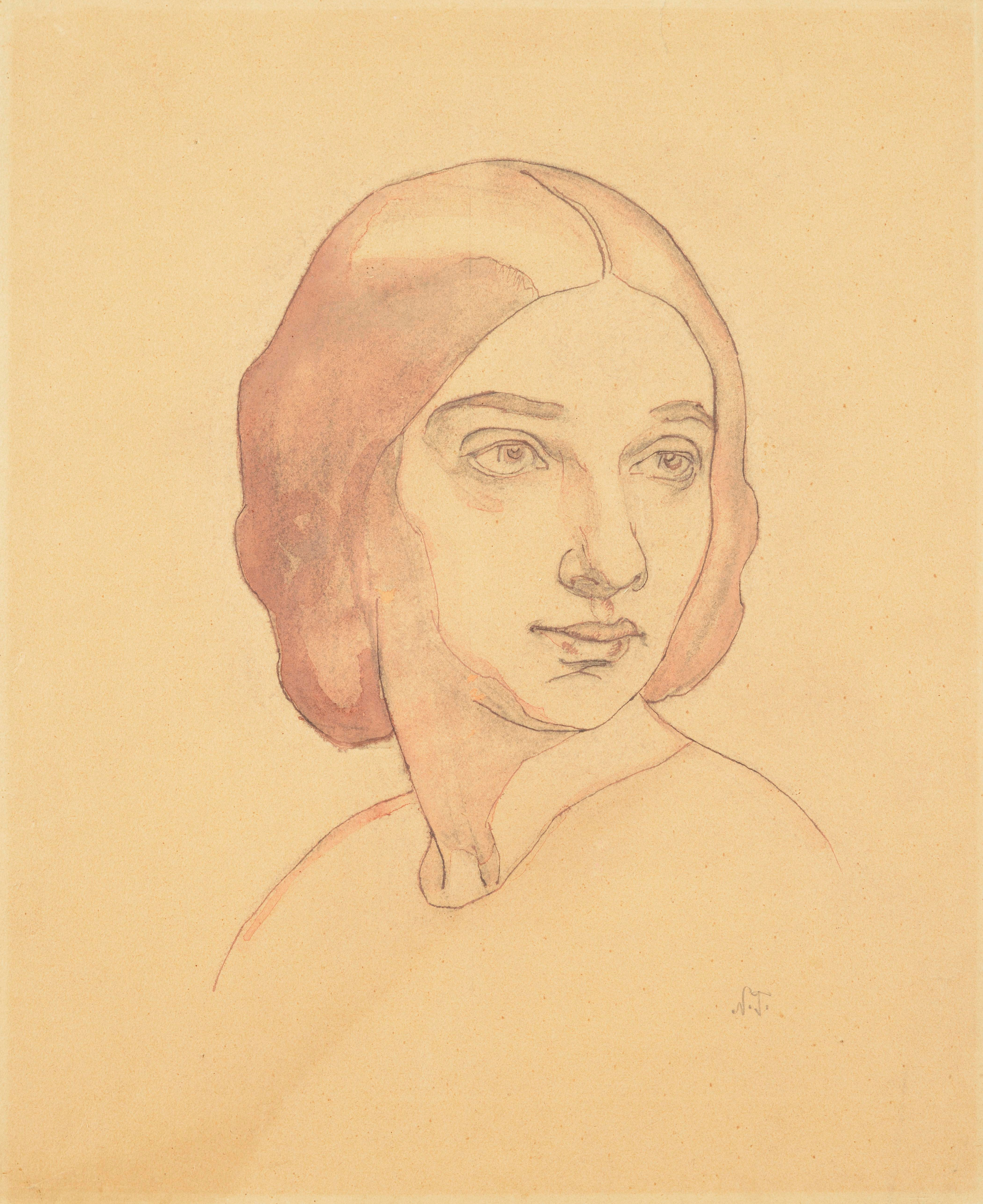
Portrait of Pr. V. Triik-Martna (undated)
