= Ado Vabbe =

Estonian painter (1892–1961)

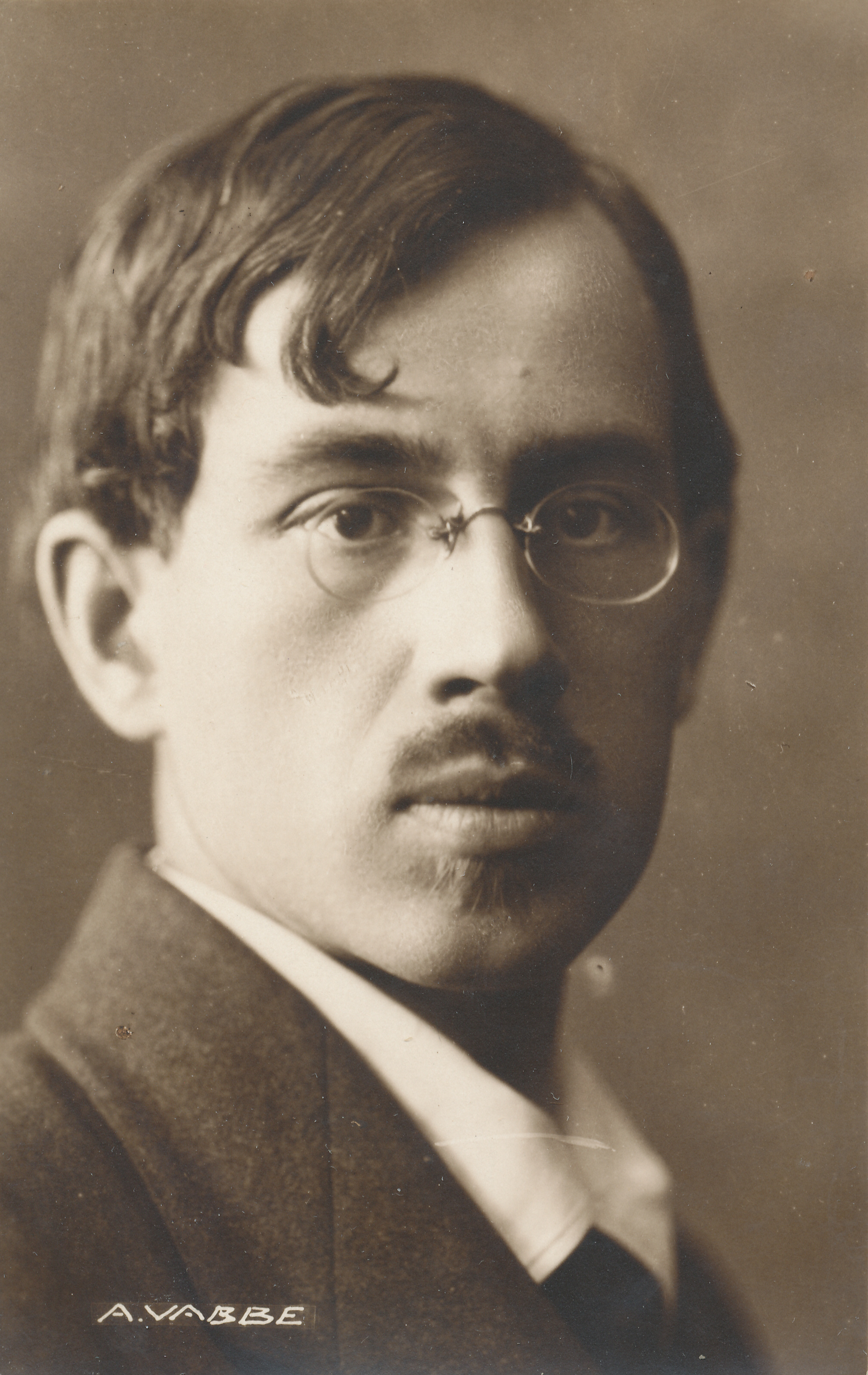
- Vabbe in 1927
- Born: 19 March 1892; Tapa, Governorate of Estonia, Russian Empire
- Died: 20 April 1961 (aged 69); Tartu, then part of Estonian SSR, Soviet Union
- Occupations: Painter; printmaker; teacher

Ado Vabbe (19 March 1892 – 20 April 1961) was an Estonian painter, printmaker, and teacher.

Ado Vabbe is known for bringing abstraction back home to Estonia after being educated at Anton Ažbe's art school in Munich from 1911 to 1913. Active as an artist, he became better known as an art teacher and was a strong influence on many modern Estonian artists. His Paraphrases are considered an important turning point in the history of Estonian art.

Vabbe died in Tartu.

To remember the artist, Ado Vabbe Art Fellowship (Estonian: Ado Vabbe nimeline stipendium) is given out by Tartu city and Tartu Cultural Endowment (Estonian: Tartu Kultuurkapital).
