= List of libraries in Estonia =

This is list of libraries in Estonia. The list is incomplete.

Name	Type	Location (city)	Opening year	Further info	Image
National Library of Estonia	national library	Tallinn			
Pärnu Central Library		Pärnu			
Repository Library of Estonia		Tallinn			
Tallinn University Academic Library	university library	Tallinn			
Tallinn University of Technology Library		Tallinn	1919		
Tartu University Library	university library	Tartu			
Tallinn Central Library		Tallinn		Owns the Katarina Jee (library bus)	
Tartu City Library		Tartu			
Central Library of Võru County		Võru	1909		

== See also ==
- List of archives in Estonia
- List of museums in Estonia
