= Rael Artel =

Estonian curator and museum director

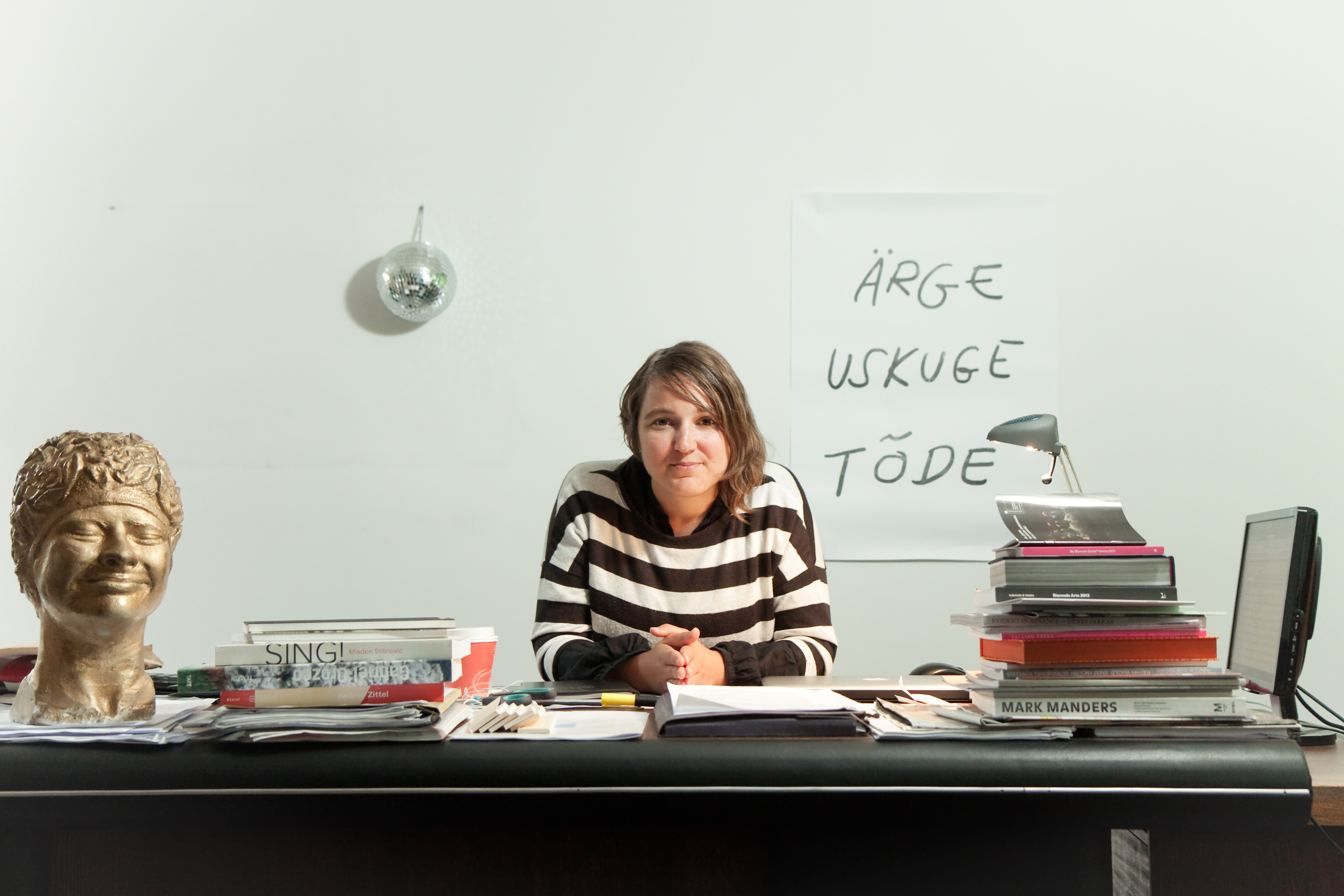
Artel in Tartu, 2013

Rael Artel (born 11 February 1980) is an Estonian art writer, curator and gallerist. Since 2013, she has been the director of Tartu Art Museum in Estonia.

== Biography ==
Rael Artel graduated from Estonian Academy of Arts in 2003. In 2004–2005 she studied curating in De Appel Art Center in Amsterdam. In 2009 she defended her M.A. thesis on criticism of nationalism in the Eastern European art in 2000–2008 in the Estonian Academy of Arts.

From 2004 to 2009, Artel owned an independent art gallery named Rael Artel Gallery: Non-Profit Project Space. In 2004–2008, it was based in Pärnu, while from March 2006 to January 9, 2009 it had a branch in Tartu, in the building of Tartu City Library.

In 2007 she initiated a project called Public Preparation, a networking and knowledge collection platform for modern European art. Since 2008, exhibitions and seminars have been held using that framework.

In 2010–2015, Rael Artel was the artistic director of ART IST KUKU NU UT, an annual festival of modern art held in Tartu. She has also held lectures in the Estonian Academy of Arts.

In March 2013, Artel became the director of Tartu Art Museum.

=== Work as a curator ===
Since 2000, Rael Artel has been a curator in Estonia, Warsaw, Lisbon, Amsterdam and New York City. Amongst those are Let's talk about nationalism! Between Ideology and Identity in Kumu (2010), Lost in Transition in Contemporary Art Museum of Estonia (2011), Art Must Be Beautiful. Selections by Marina Abramović in Tartu Art Museum (2011), Life in the Forest in Arsenal Gallery in Białystok (2011), After Socialist Statues in the modern art center KIM? in Riga (2011), Explosion in Pärnu and Old News in Kumu as part of the exhibition Archaeology and the future of Estonian art scenes (2012), Marge Monko's How to Wear Red? in Tartu Art Museum (2013) ning My Poland. On Recalling and Forgetting in Tartu Art Museum (2015). In 2012, Rael Artel and Kaisa Eiche (:et) were curators for an exhibition of the most scandalous works in modern Estonian art MÖH? FUI! ÖÄK! OSSA! VAU! in Tartu Art Museum.

In January 2016, Rael Artel was awarded the annual Cultural Endowment of Estonia for her work as a curator and as a museum director.
