= My Poland. On Recalling and Forgetting =

Holocaust-themed art exhibition in Estonia

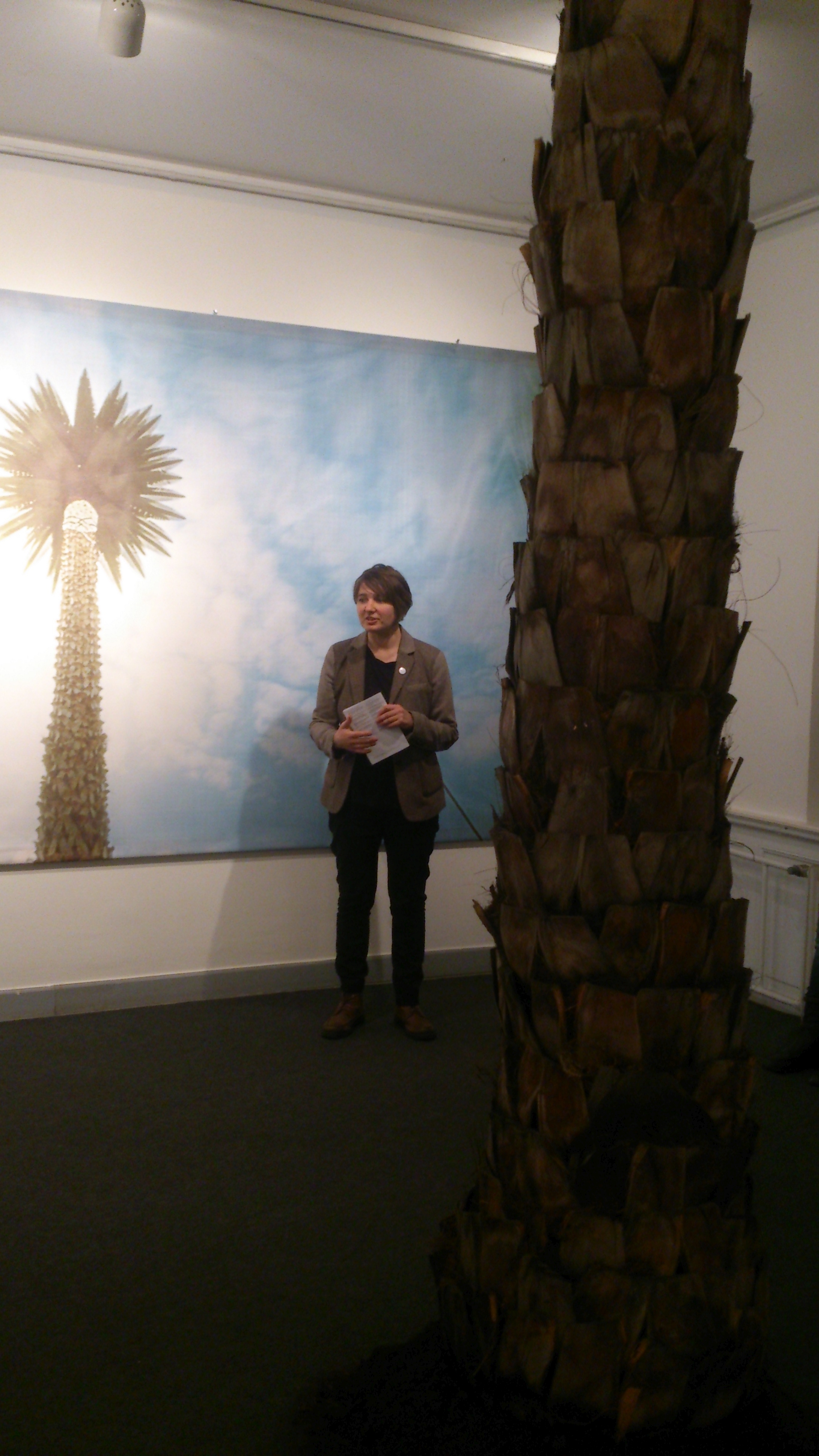
Curator Rael Artel talking in front of the installation "Greeting from the Jerusalem Avenue" by Polish artist Joanna Rajkowska

My Poland. On Recalling and Forgetting is the first Holocaust-themed art exhibition in Estonia, taking place at Tartu Art Museum in early 2015, seventy years after the end of World War II and the liberation of the Nazi extermination camps.

The exhibition, curated by museum's director Rael Artel, received a lot of attention from Estonian society and from both Estonian and international media. It brought out the differences of opinion and initiated a public debate about the reflection of Holocaust and freedom of speech, censorship and self-censorship in art. Originally, eight contemporary artworks were exhibited, one of them by an Estonian artist and seven from Polish artists (incl. one Polish–Israeli and one American with Polish Jewish roots). Soon after the opening of the exhibition the museum limited access to two works of art because of public criticism. Later, both of them were removed from the exhibition.

The name of the exhibition My Poland emphasizes curators personal perspective to Polish contemporary art where Holocaust and the Second World War is a distinctive theme. The name refers to a popular Estonian books series ("My Estonia", "My Mexico", "My St. Petersburg", etc.) which also focuses on authors' personal impressions of different countries.

The works selected for the exhibition in Tartu Art Museum are made by well-known Polish artists most of whom have participated in the Venice Biennale. Curator Rael Artel has said that although she tried to find comparable works from Estonian art, the only Holocaust themed work was John Smith's painting Holocaust.

The exhibition is accompanied by a publication put together by Rael Artel and designed by Mikk Heinsoo. The exhibition was supported by the Cultural Endowment of Estonia and Estonian Ministry of Culture. My Poland is curated by the director of Tartu Art Museum Rael Artel and exhibition's coordinator is Julia Polujanenkova, museums' keeper of the contemporary art.

== Removal of videos from the exhibition ==
My Poland was opened on Saturday, 7 February. On Tuesday, Tartu Art Museum announced that access to two most criticized videos was being limited. Visitors could only see those videos by stating a direct request and after being introduced to curator's written explanation. Museum's director Artel made a full apology to everyone the display offended. Estonian Ministry of Culture held a discussion which was attended by Minister of Culture Urve Tiidus and the representatives of Jewish community in Estonia. After the discussion Tiidus called the videos offending and Tartu Art Museum removed them from the exhibition entirely.

As the museum was closed on Monday and Tuesday and the videos were already removed by Wednesday afternoon, the videos in question were introduced only to a small part of exhibition visitors. Therefore, majority of people who have participated in the debate have not been familiar with the content of the videos or knew them only on the basis of clips shown in the news and on the basis of written summaries.

The removal of videos has been evaluated differently. For example, journalist Kadri Veermäe from major Estonian daily Postimees interpreted it as a censorship or self-censorship. On the other hand, Kaarel Tarand, former editor-in-chief of Estonian main cultural newspaper Sirp, did not consider this as a result of censorship. Estonian artist Kiwa regarded it as the criminalization of art.

After videos were removed, the museum decided to use that room do present the documentation about the public discussion about the exhibition on both traditional and social media, considering the themes of censure and self-censorship.

== Works and artists ==
- In Yael Bartana's video Dreams and Nightmares (Mary Koszmary, 2007), a politician is talking to a deserted overgrown stadium where only a handful of scouts are listening, about reconciliation on Jews and Poles, the need for Jews to return to restore Poland's cultural diversity and create a shared future. Estonian art theorist Indrek Grigor considers it to be the central work of the exhibition: ˮFor a person like me, for whom Jews have largely been just literary characters from Isaac Babel's Odessa Tales, this video gave a glimpse of the actual cultural shock Poland went through after the genocide. If we were to translate that experience into the context of Estonian culture we could try to reappraise the influence of Russian culture on Estonia's cultural diversity and its very viability!"
- Zbigniew Libera's photograph from the series Residents (2003) shows smiling people in analogous positions to people in a famous photograph depicting Auschwitz prisoners being released.
- Documentation of Greetings from Jerusalem Avenue (2002) by Joanna Rajkowska introduces one of the most striking monuments of Warsaw, the capital of Poland: an artificial palm tree, that artist conceived while visiting Jerusalem. This work reminds the cultural diversity of pre-war Poland. It is set up on the Jerusalem Avenue in Warsaw. ˮTo me the highlight of the documentation of Rajkowska's work presented on the exhibition is not actually connected with the author but with the human rights activist campaign where a traditional Palestinian headscarf was tied around the palm tree,ˮ says Indrek Grigor.
- John Smith's (a pseudonym used by Marko Mäetamm and Kaido Ole) painting Holocaust portrays two men driving through a landscape, seeing writing "Holocaust" on a hilltop in resemblance to the famous landmark "Hollywood". According to Artel, that painting draws attention to the commercialization of Holocaust by the movie industry led by Hollywood, as it has transformed the pain of millions of people into money.
- Installation Warsaw (2005) by Wilhelm Sasnal consists of the word Warsaw which is written on a white wall using a gunpowder-coated wire, cut in half into words WAR and SAW - "SAW WAR".
- Short comic by American artist Art Spiegelman Breakdowns: Portrait of the Artist as a Young %@?*! (2008) is describing Jewish family heirloom as a monster locked in a chest, creating a perpetual sense of guilt. It can be understood as the guilt of surviving Holocaust. Pulitzer Prize-winning two-volume novel Maus (1991) by Spiegelman is also available on the exhibition. In the review of the exhibition, Indrek Grigor sees a parallel between Spiegelman's comic and the historical experience of Estonians: ˮ...just like the Jewish community is haunted by the Holocaust trauma from generation to generation as it has been shown on the exhibition by the autobiographical comics of American cartoonist Art Spiegelman; so, too, the present writer has a box of letters sent from Siberia to Estonia describing how people dug a pentagon shaped campfire, danced and played around it and thanked their dear leader Stalin for their daily bread."
- The Game of Tag (1999) by Artur Żmijewski was exhibited on the 7th Berlin Biennale in 2012. The author commented his work on the Estonian news program Aktuaalne kaamera as follows: ˮIt is a very serious situation. There are the bodies of living people, the situation is alive – instead of a tragedy we just have life." In the publication which accompanies the exhibition, curator Rael Artel connected The Game of Tag with the notion of 'bare life' by philosopher Giorgio Agamben referring to a human being who has lost all legal rights and is not protected by any cultural conventions. In Postimees, Kadri Veermäe wrote about the background of the video: "Certainly, there are many of those who have watched Żmijewski's The Game of Tag on the Internet and have been surprised that they are actually not that shocked. The one who was shocked was Żmijewski himself when he was an assistant teacher and went on an excursion to the camps with school children who started cheerfully playing tag in the concentration camp's gas chambers." Estonian Jewish semiotician and culture theorist Mihhail Lotman interpretes the situation as follows: "A prospective viewer's cognitive dissonance between the game and Holocaust is the aspect that should be shocking. But this arises in the mind of the viewer, not on screen or at shooting. We can start by recognizing that none of the participants are Jewish /---/. Further, anyone who knows something about history knows that men and women were separated in the camps /---/. Maybe the best justification for this work (in terms of its quality I have big doubts) is that it can create a lot of grief. We need so little to bring back the memory of Holocaust."
- The video 80064 (2004) by Artur Żmijewski features a conversation with former prisoner of Auschwitz Józef Tarnawa who, after a negotiation, lets the artist to renew his concentration camp tattoo. According to Żmijewski, it symbolizes renewing the man's honour: ˮIn the video he is handled like a monument from the past which must be kept in good condition. The other meaning is to repeat the violent act from the past. In both films I tried to reopen up the past, truly reopen, not just recall, but really jump into that past moment when the tattoo was made and people were in the gas chambers." Semiotician Mihhail Lotman regards the video as shocking but also multidimensional: ˮ92-year-old Auschwitz survivor Józef Tarnawa eventually agrees and lets to renew his tattoo 80064. The man asks not to do so, saying that it is visible enough and after, it would not be authentic etc. But director Artur Żmijewski is ruthless and soon the old man surrenders and lets them to renew his tattoo. In the end he is not happy with the result, he feels like a piece of furniture. In another interview the director says that of course he agreed in the end because he got 500 euros for it and they had a contract. The message here is vague and might be multidimensional /---/. I draw the attention of watchful jewish community to the aspect that no one said it is a Jew in the video. There is nothing distinctive about his appearances, even the artist says that he does not know what the old man's nationality is and that it doesn't even really matter. Maybe it is the Polish community who should protest?"

== Public response ==
On the opening day, Eesti Televisioon's news program Aktuaalne kaamera asked the chairwoman of Tartu Jewish Community Ilona Smuškina to visit the exhibition My Poland. She found it to be emotionally uncomfortable: ˮI couldn't watch the video of the gas chamber for more than three seconds. But the old man who was tortured in Auschwitz, now he is tortured by the young man who did this artwork." Afterwards, the chairwoman of Estonian Jewish Community, Alla Jakobson, spoke out in the media. She announced that she feels insulted, she does not consider Artur Żmijewski's videos to be art at all and insists they should be removed from the exhibition: ˮIt is unacceptable and inappropriate to exhibit videos like this in a Holocaust art exhibition." On 10 February, a public statement to Estonian state leaders by Estonian Jewish Community was made, saying: "It would be unthinkable to show nudity in an exhibition dedicated to Soviet deportations from Estonia. Why is Holocaust an exception justified with the artistic freedom?" Statement made after the opening of the exhibition found supporters by many organisations, politicians and cultural figures: Estonian member of European Parliament Urmas Paet, Foreign Minister Keit Pentus-Rosimannus, Minister of Culture Urve Tiidus, Minister of Defence Sven Mikser, former Minister of Regional Affairs Vallo Reimaa, Chairman of Estonian Parliament Eiki Nestor, former Minister of Culture Laine Randjärv, former mayor of Tallinn Jüri Ratas, Estonian Islamic Congregation, Tartu City Council's Commission of Culture, art historian Krista Piirimäe, etc. Criticism directed to My Poland also escalated quickly in the international press, particularly in Russia and Israel. Among others, the Wiesenthal Center's director Efraim Zuroff criticized the exhibition, stating that it is not enough to remove two videos as the whole exhibition should be shut down.

Main critical arguments include joking about Holocaust, mocking, lack of empathy amongst the artists and the authors of the exhibition, and the need to identify the boundaries of art. "I think that there should be ethical boundaries of freedom of speech and freedom of expression of art that should not be prescribed by law but should be in the hearts of people," said Laine Randjärv. "Organizers of the exhibition have been ignoring the principles of good practices and the principles of respecting other people and nations," found Jüri Ratas. "The reaction and the triggered debate in the society leads us to ask again where are the boundaries of art," said Urve Tiidus.

A couple of days later, first statements supporting the curator and Tartu Art Museum started to appear, mostly made by people of art and culture. The criticism was also disputed by the interview to Eesti Televisioon by the author of the most criticized videos, Artur Żmijewski, who said: "We recall the past events and it is not a passive recalling but an active one. My purpose is not to provoke anyone. There are always those who feel provoked but it wasn't my intention." Among the supporters of the exhibition have been a board member of the Contemporary Art Museum of Estonia Anders Härm, artist Kiwa, artist Jaan Elken, semiotician Mihhail Lotman, artist Marko Mäetamm (the single Estonian artist represented on the exhibition), former Minister of Culture Rein Lang, journalist Kadri Veermäe, artist Marge Monko, etc.

On ETV morning show Terevisioon, Sirje Helme, the director of Estonian Art Museum Kumu, commented the situation as follows: ˮThis debate can't be about whether it is art or not. The question is, how far can an artwork go in its freedom to sharply touch this or that subject. /.../ I think that there are almost no limits in democratic freedom but some things are agreed upon not to be touched, and Holocaust is certainly one of those things. So the question is not whether it is a good or bad work of art, the problem is that it has touched a subject which is declared to be taboo in Europe and America. /.../ This is a political world, not a world of art. I think this subject does not belong to the art world." Anders Härm responded: ˮI think that there is no such rule. There is no theme more mediated than Holocaust if we talk about the horrors during the Second World War. The work by John Smith referred to this – commercialization of Holocaust. Jean Baudrillard and Umberto Eco have also talked about how Hollywood wouldn't let Jews to forgive and Germans to be forgiven." Sirje Helme said: ˮFor me, this question is in black and white. I will stick to my opinion that it is not about art with its aesthetical criteria and sensitivities. The question here is that the topic is sacred and only certain people can engage in it."
