= Piir (surname) =

Piir is a surname. Notable people with the surname include:

- Ly Piir (1930–2020), Estonian figure skater and coach
- Uno Piir (1929–2025), Estonian football coach and player

== See also ==
- Piirimäe, another surname
