= Piirimäe =

Family name

Origin
- Language: Estonian
- Meaning: border hill
- Region of origin: Estonia

Other names
- Related names: Piir, Piiri, Piirimägi, Piirimaa

Piirimäe is an Estonian surname meaning "border hill". It is derived from the compound words piiri, the genitive singular of piir, meaning "border"; and mäe, the genitive singular of mägi, meaning "hill".

As of 1 January 2022, 23 men and 33 women have the surname Piirimäe in Estonia. Piirimäe ranks 5,290th for men and 3,868th for women in the distribution of surnames in Estonia. The surname Piirimäe is most common in Järva County, where 2.70 per 10,000 inhabitants of the county bear the surname. Notable people bearing the surname Piirimäe include:

- Helmut Piirimäe (1930–2017), Estonian historian
- Kaarel Piirimäe (born 1979), Estonian historian (:et)
- Kätlin Piirimäe (born 1995), Estonian track and field athlete
- Krista Piirimäe (born 1946), Estonian art historian
- Kristjan Piirimäe (born 1975), Estonian hydrobiologist
- Pärtel Piirimäe (born 1972), Estonian historian (:et)
