= Krista Piirimäe =

Estonian art historian

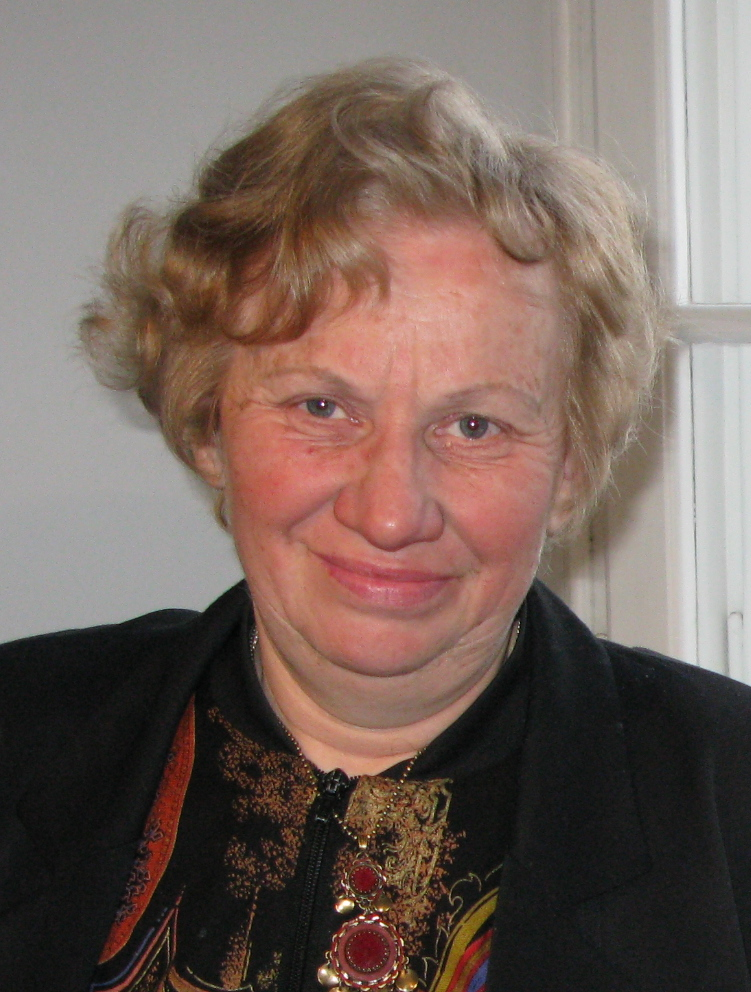
Krista Piirimäe

Krista Piirimäe (born Krista Hiiemets on 5 April 1946) is an Estonian art historian.

Piirimäe was born in Tallinn. In 1970 she graduated from the University of Tartu. Since 1970 she has worked at the Tartu Art Museum.

Her spouse was the historian Helmut Piirimäe.

== Works ==
- Professor Aleksander Vardi looming aastail 1961–1971 (catalogue). Tartu: 1972.
- Väliskunstinäitused Eestis aastail 1920–1940 // Tartu Kunstimuuseumi kogude teatmik. Tartu: 1985.
- Tartu Riiklik Kunstiinstituut 1950. aastal // TÜ Ajaloo Küsimusi XXV. 1991.
- Eesti kunstinäitus Pariisis 1929. a. // Looming, 1995, Issue 2.
- Tartu Kunstimuuseumi asutamine stalinistliku kultuuripoliitika taustal // Muuseum, 2001, Issue 1.
- Aleksander Vardi dekoraatorina Pärnus ja Tartus // TMK, 2001, Issues 8–9.
- 100 aastat Voldemar Ermi sünnist // Muuseum, 2005, Issue 2.
