= Tartu Art Museum =

Museum in Tartu, Estonia

Coordinates: 58.3808°N 26.7242°E

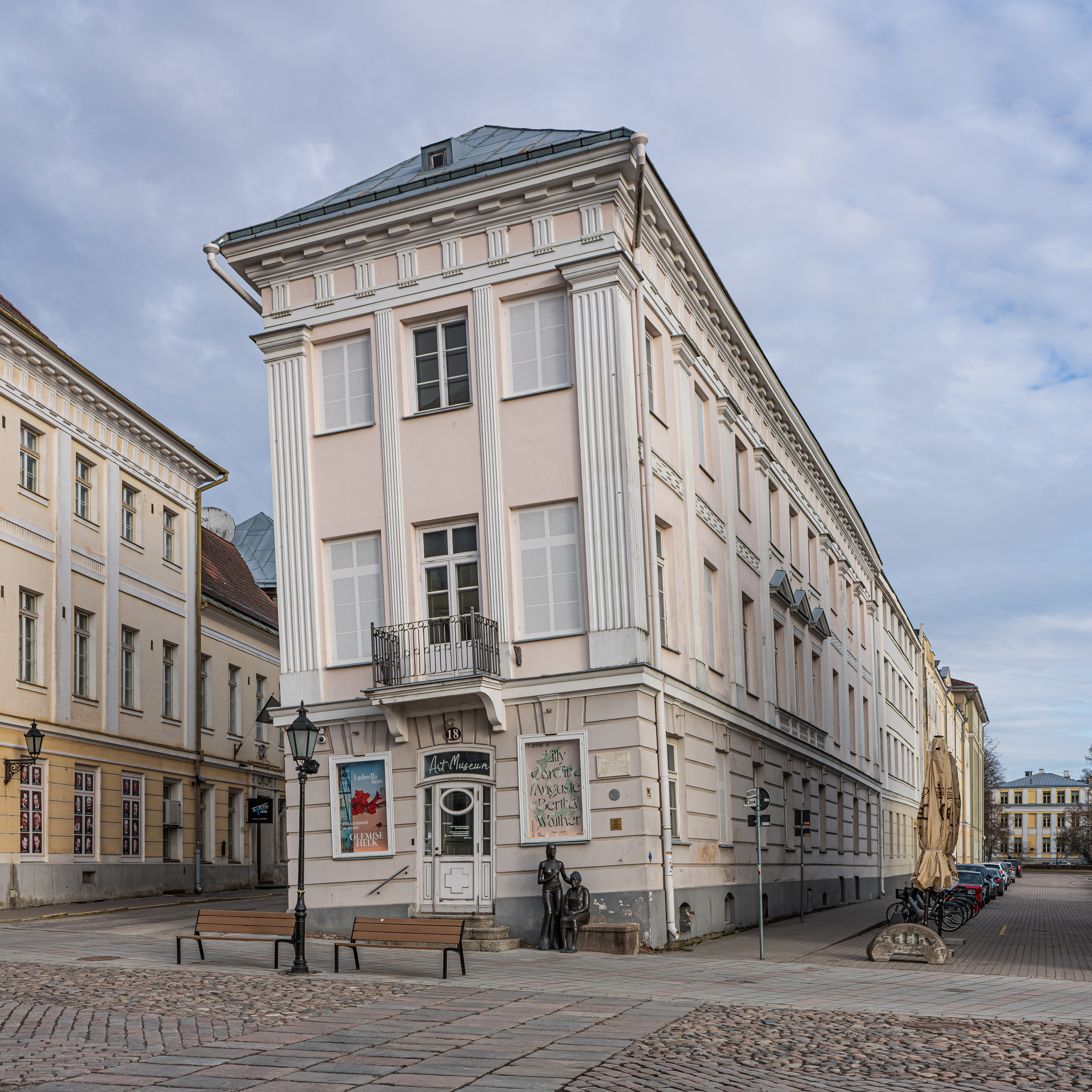
Exhibition building of the Tartu Art Museum

The Tartu Art Museum (Estonian: Tartu Kunstimuuseum) is a state-owned museum of art located in Tartu, Estonia. It was founded in 1940 on a private initiative by the members of local art school Pallas. This is the largest art museum in Southern Estonia.

The main collection consists of works of art by Estonian and foreign artists, associated with Estonia, from the 18th century until now. The collection includes around 23,000 items. The museum presents temporary exhibitions drawn from the museum's collection, and in cooperation with Estonian and foreign museums and galleries. Exhibitions are held in a historical building situated by the Town Hall Square of Tartu.

== History of the museum ==
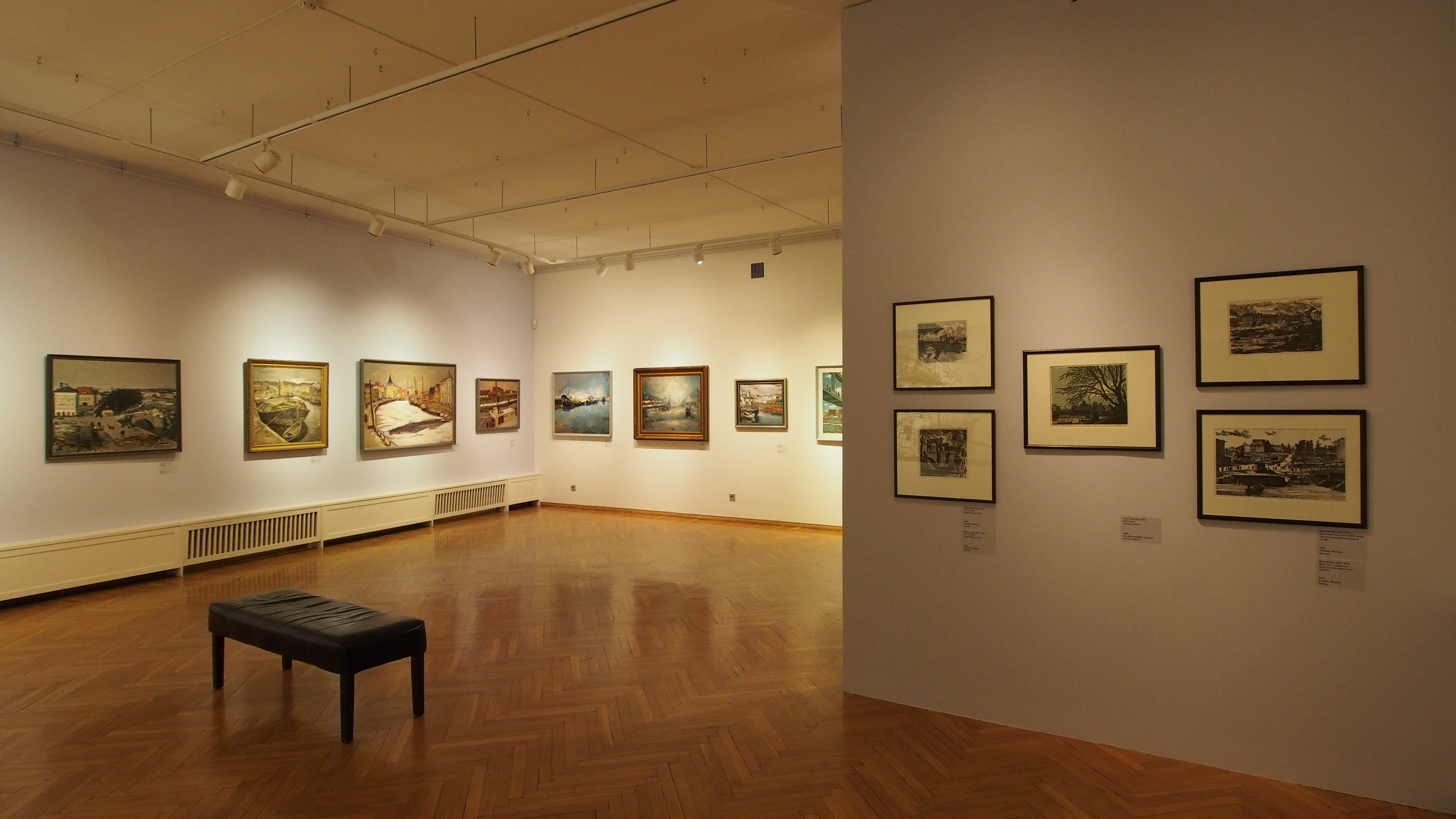
Museum interior. Exhibition "Changing Tartu in Four Views".

In 1918 the artistic association Pallas established the Higher Art School Pallas which later played a key role in local art education. Twenty years after the formation of the Pallas association, they decided to create a museum, and on November 17, 1940, the Municipality of Tartu signed a decree for the establishment of the art museum, which was located at Suurturg 3 (now – Raekoja Square, 3). In summer 1941 the State Ethnographic Museum (now – the Estonian National Museum) gave the museum its 20th century art collection.

During the war the museum had to be relocated a number of times. The most critical situation occurred in 1943 when, during a bombing raid the brick building at Lai 17, which at that time housed the collection, collapsed. However, the majority of the collection was saved. After a number of moves, in 1946 the museum was established on two floors of a building at Vallikraavi, 14. Over time the building has been rebuilt for museum needs. Initially there were storage and exhibition halls in the building, but in 1999 it was decided to close the building to visitors to better preserve the growing art collection. Today the building houses storage, administration, employees' offices, restoration workshops, library and archives.

Since 1988 the Falling House has also been used by the Tartu Art Museum.

The Tartu Art Museum has had two personal museums of single artists: Anton Starkopf's museum in Tartu (1972–1997) and Eduard Kutsar's museum in Elva (1971–2012).

In 2013–2017, the Tartu Art Museum was led by Rael Artel, a former independent curator and gallerist.

=== Rael Artel ===
Since 2013 the museum has been led by Rael Artel. Prior to her work at the museum she was a freelance curator, working on international exhibitions of contemporary art in Estonia and abroad. As a guest curator Rael Artel worked with the Kumu Art Museum in Tallinn and the Art Museum in Lodz, Poland.According to the proposal of the competition committee the Minister of Culture Indrek Saar and Rael Artel signed an employment contract for a new term of office in 2016. Rael Artel left the Tartu Art Museum in June 2017.

=== Signe Kivi ===
As of June 26 Signe Kivi assumed the position of the museum's director. Prior to her work at the museum she was Minister of Culture of the Republic of Estonia (1999–2002), member of Parliament (2002–2005) and rector of The Estonian Academy of Arts (2005–2015). In 2019 Kivi left the position to become member of Parliament.

=== Leaning House ===
Since 1988, the Tartu Art Museum's exhibitions have been held in the building known as the Leaning House, situated in Raekoja square, 18. Built in 1793 the building belonged to a noble family, Barclay de Tolly. The Leaning House got its name because over the years the building began to tilt to one side due to the different materials used in its foundations. However, after restoration by Polish experts, the building ceased to "fall".

The building consists of three floors with temporary exhibitions, an educational classroom and a specialised bookstore.

== The museum's collection ==
The foundation of the museum's collection started with 133 works by artists from the Pallas artistic association. The first entry in the catalogue was "Interior" by Ida Anton-Agu. The legacy of the artistic association Pallas is an important part of the collection, including works by Nikolai Triik, Konrad Mägi, Ado Vabbe, Aleksander Vardi, Karin Luts and others.

In addition to artists from Pallas, the museum also houses works by the most important figures of 19th century Estonian art, such as Johann Köhler (National Awakening Period) and Julie Wilhelmine Hagen-Schwartz (Baltic Germans).

The museum's collection also includes works by famous Russian artists and artists from other countries. Russian school is represented by Ivan Aivazovsky, Ivan Shishkin, Maximilian Voloshin, Konstantin Somov, Mikhail Larionov, Natalia Goncharova and others.

In total the museum has about 23 000 works of art. The museum's collections consist of paintings, drawings, graphics, sculpture and contemporary art forms (photography, video art, performance art, sound art, installations). You can view the collections at the museums' website MUIS.

In recent years, some the exhibitions of modern art in the museum have initiated a wide public debate about the merits and borders of art. The most controversial exhibitions have been MÖH? FUI! ÖÄK! OSSA! VAU! in 2012, exhibiting the most scandalous works of Estonian art since the 1990s, and "My Poland. On Recalling and Forgetting" in 2015, exhibiting modern Polish art about the Holocaust.

=== Selected works ===
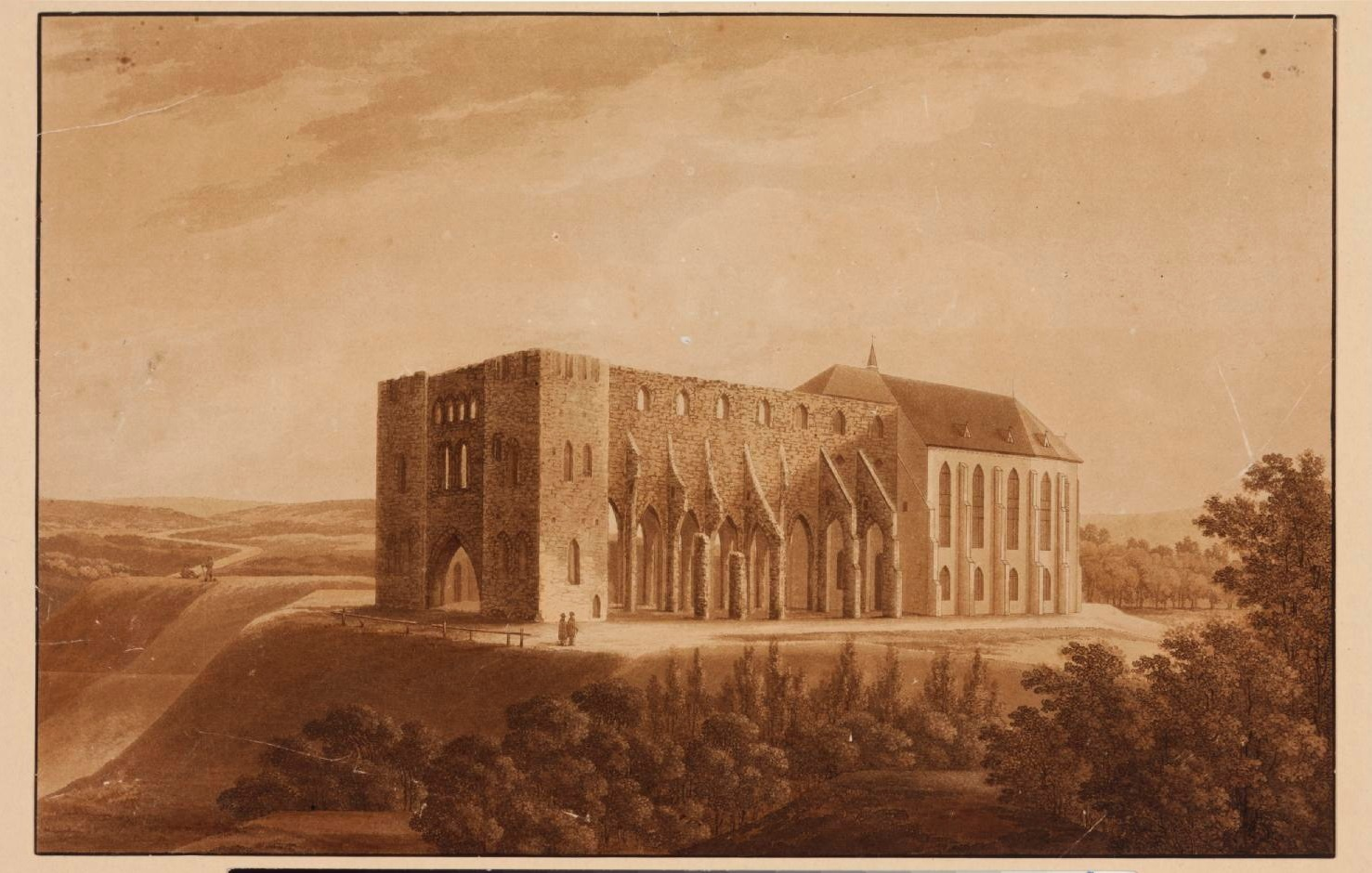
August Matthias Hagen (1794‒1878). Ruins on Toome Hill. Before 1825. Aquatint, paper.

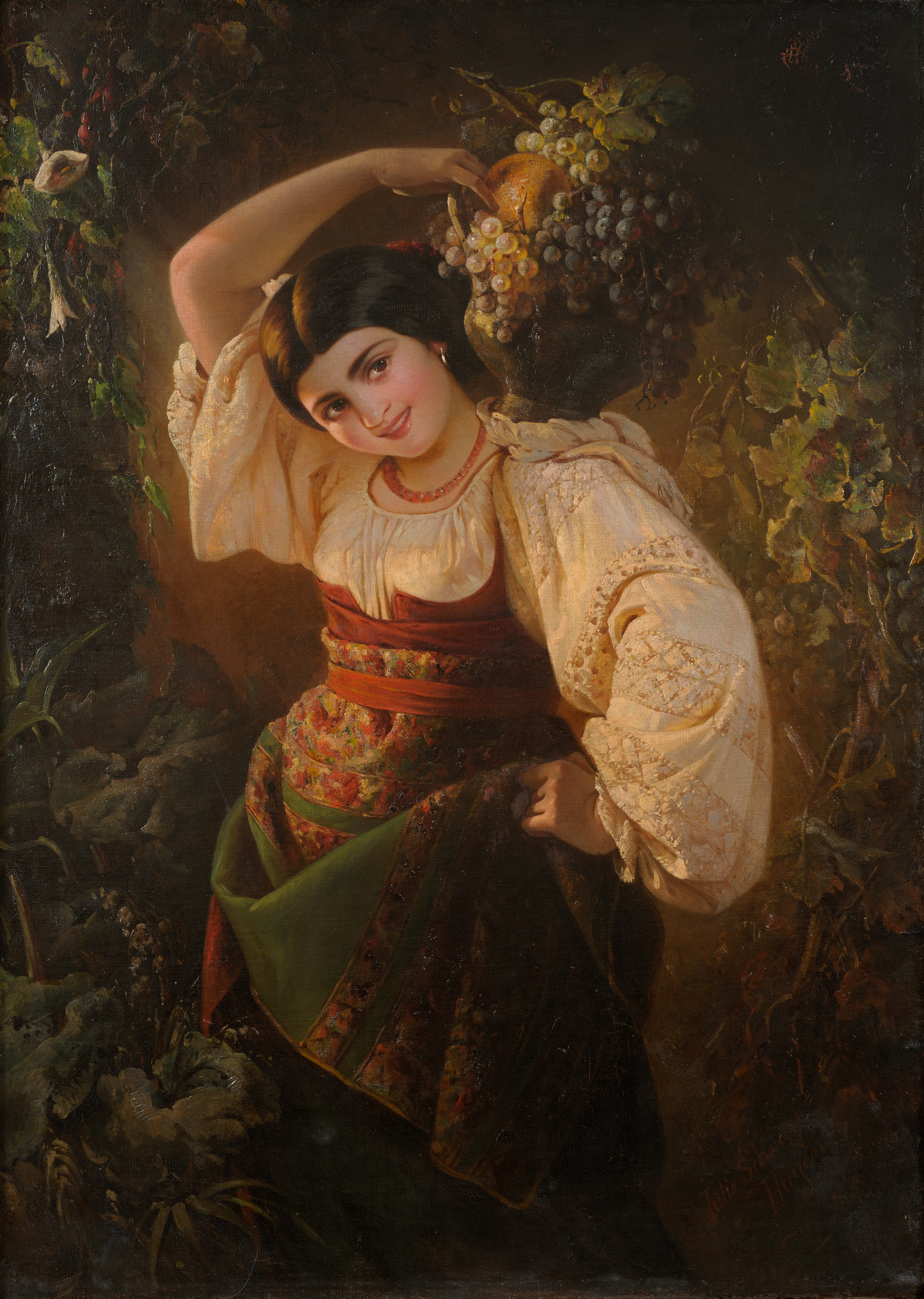
Julie Wilhelmine Hagen-Schwarz (1824‒1902). Italian Woman with a Vase. Ca 1850s. Canvas, oil

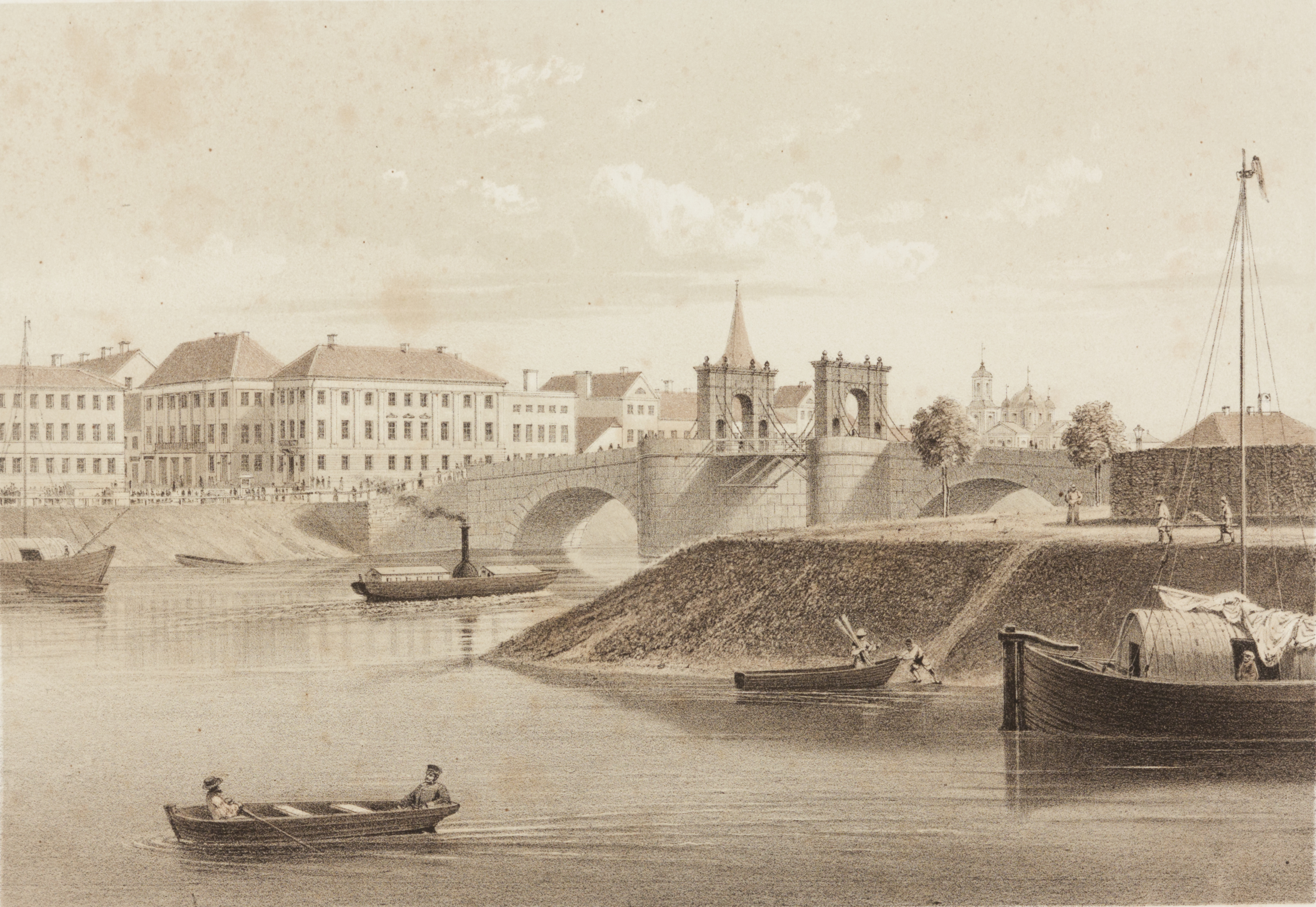
Louis Höflinger (1827‒c.1900). Stone Bridge (from Album von Dorpat und Umgebungen). Lithograph, paper. 1860.

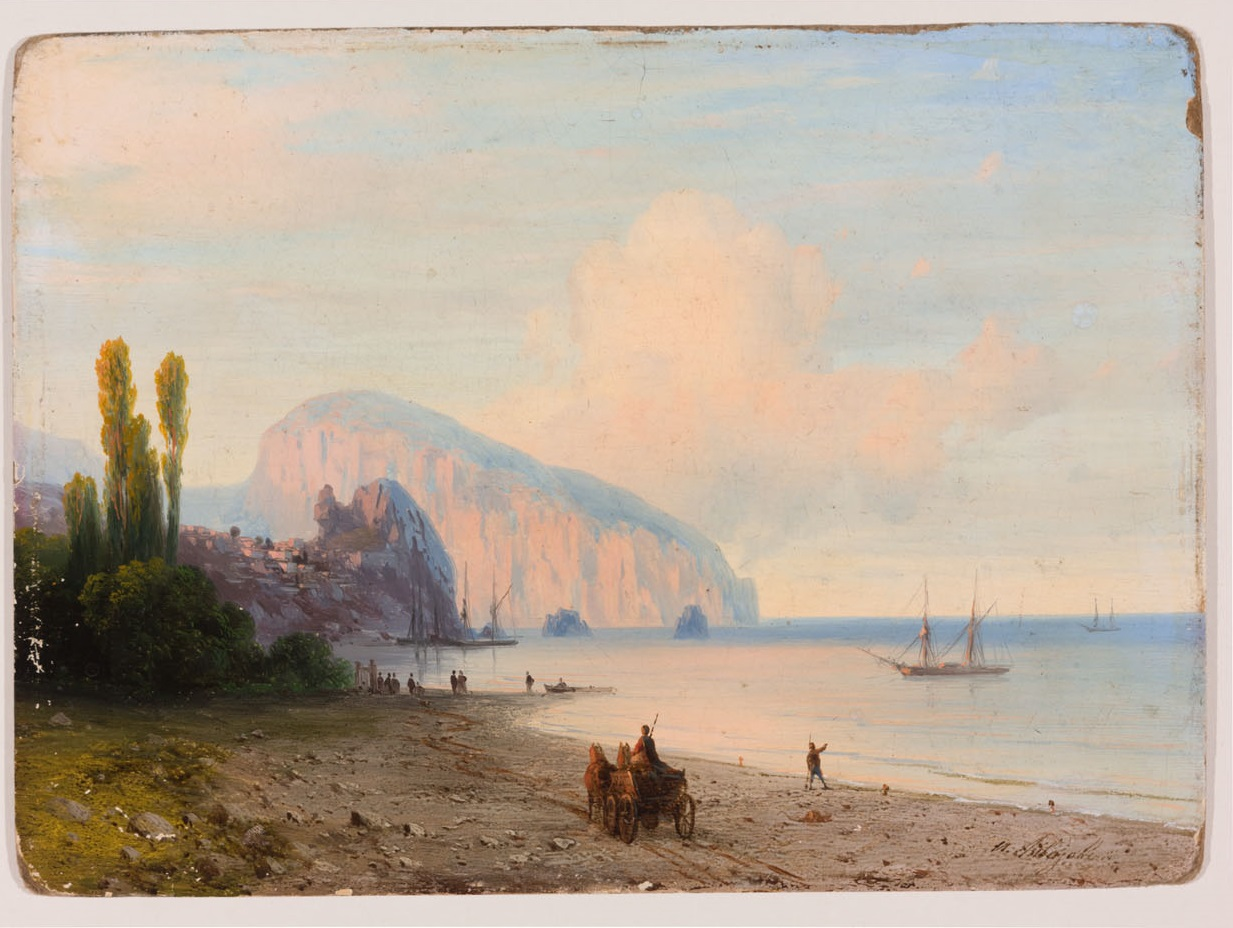
Ivan Aivazovsky (1818‒1900). Aiju-Dag. Cardboard, oil, 20,3 x 27,9.

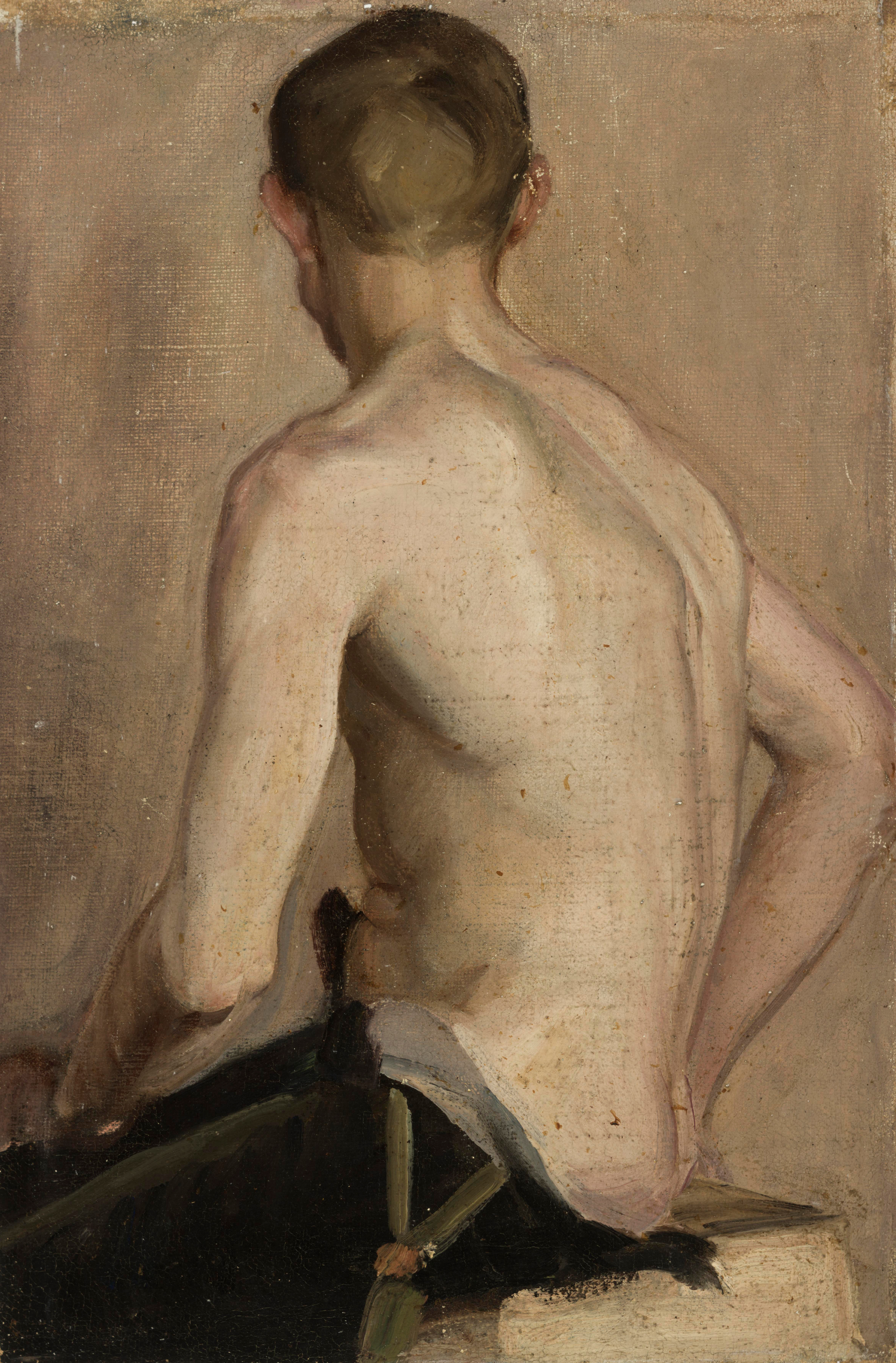
Nikolai Triik (1884‒1940). Seated Male Nude. Ca. 1905. Canvas, oil.

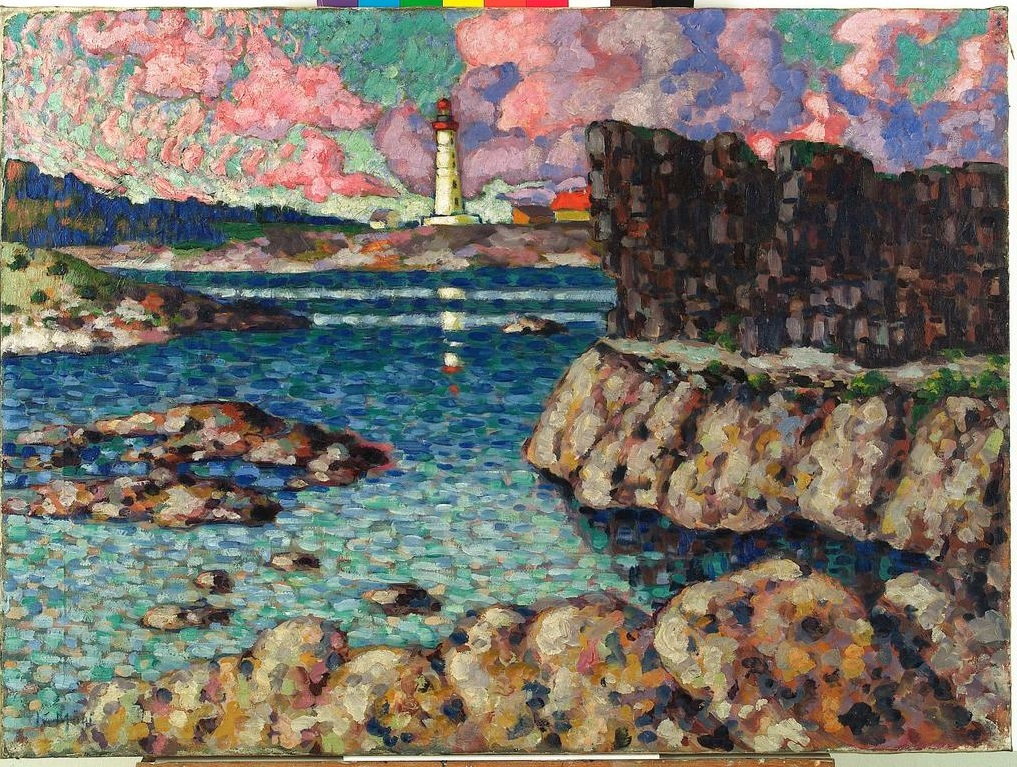
Konrad Mägi (1878–1925). Landscape of Vilsandi. 1913‒1914. Canvas, oil.

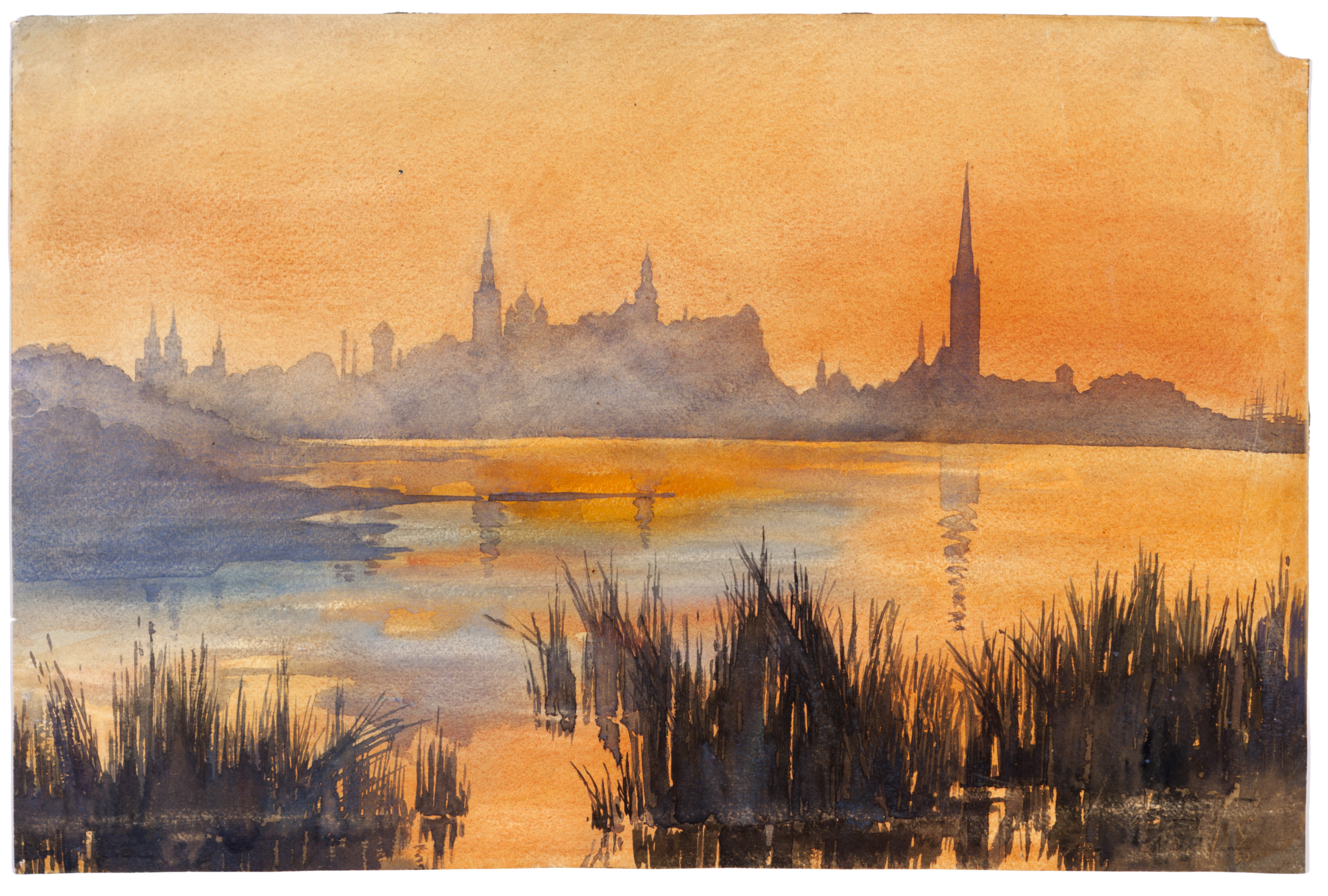
Lilly Walther (1866‒1946). View of Tallinn. 1913. Paper, watercolor.

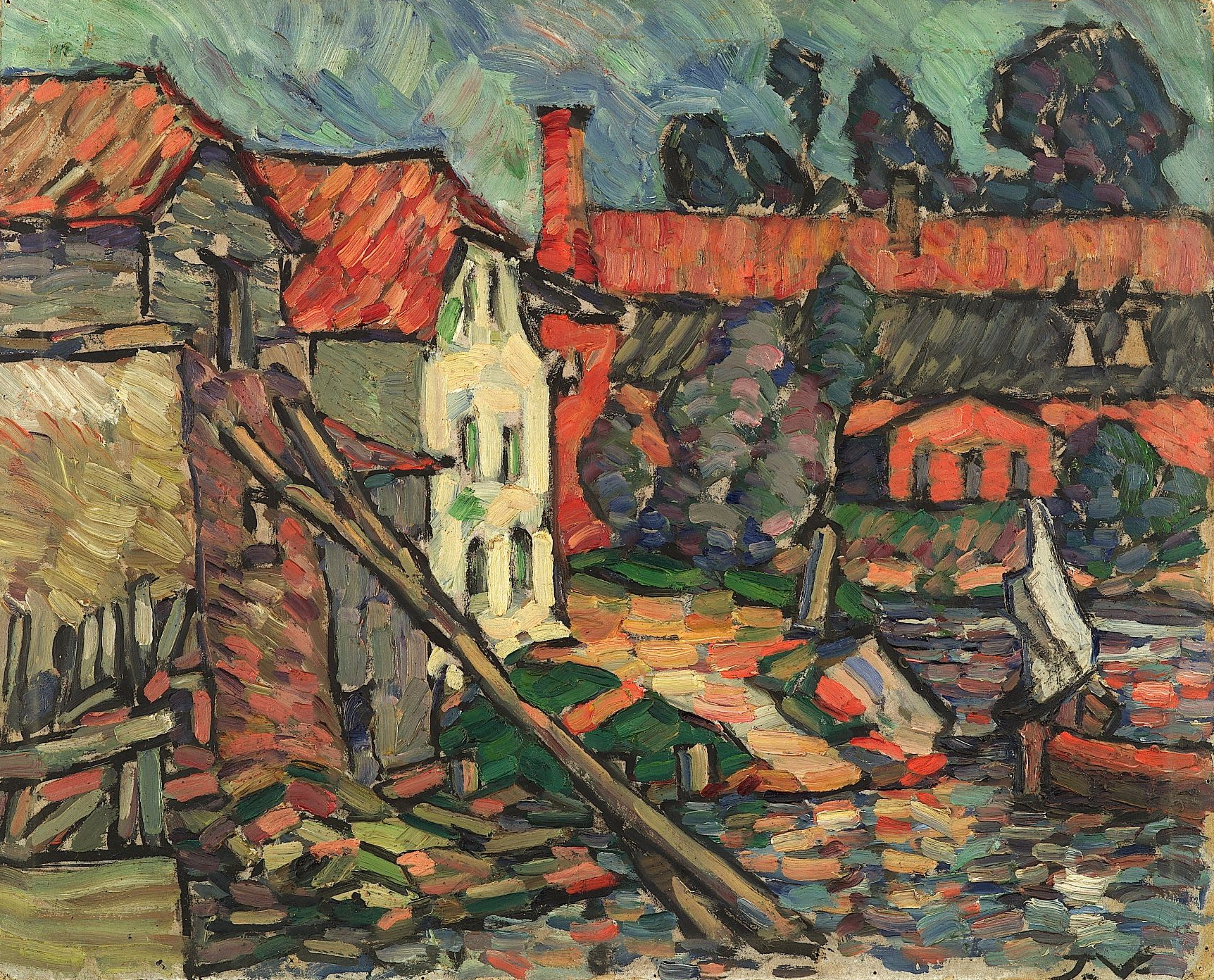
Jaan Vahtra (1882–1947). Räpina mill. 1913. Board, oil.

Aleksander Uurits (1888‒1918). Portrait of a Lady. 1917. Canvas, oil.

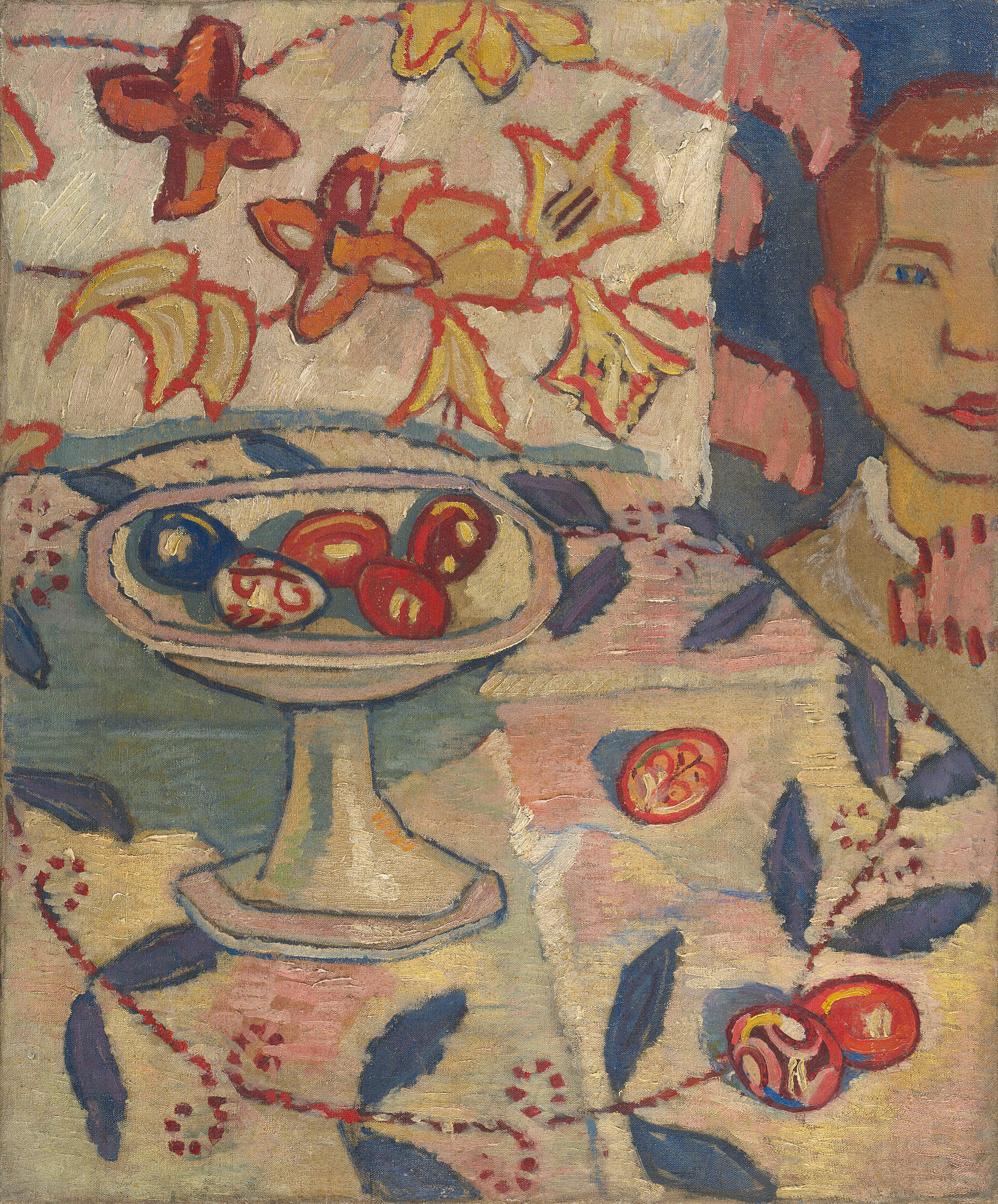
Villem Ormisson (1892–1941). Still Life with Colored Eggs. Ca. 1914‒1918. Canvas, oil.

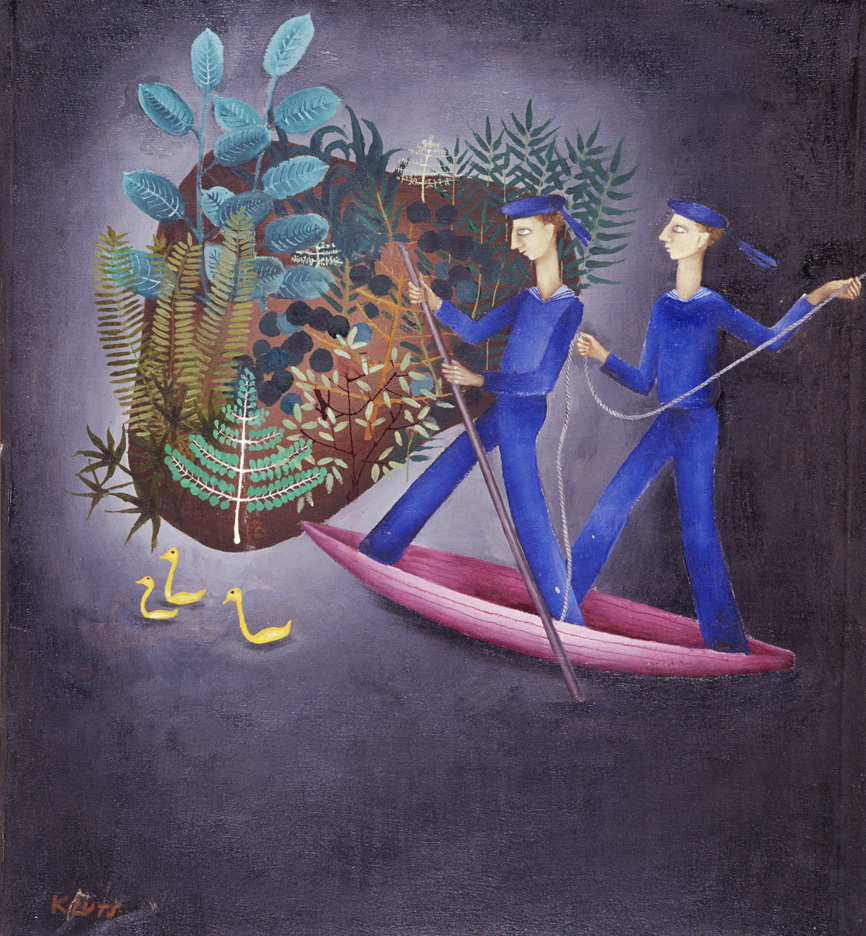
Karin Luts (1904–1993). Composition. Island of Happiness. 1927. Canvas, oil.

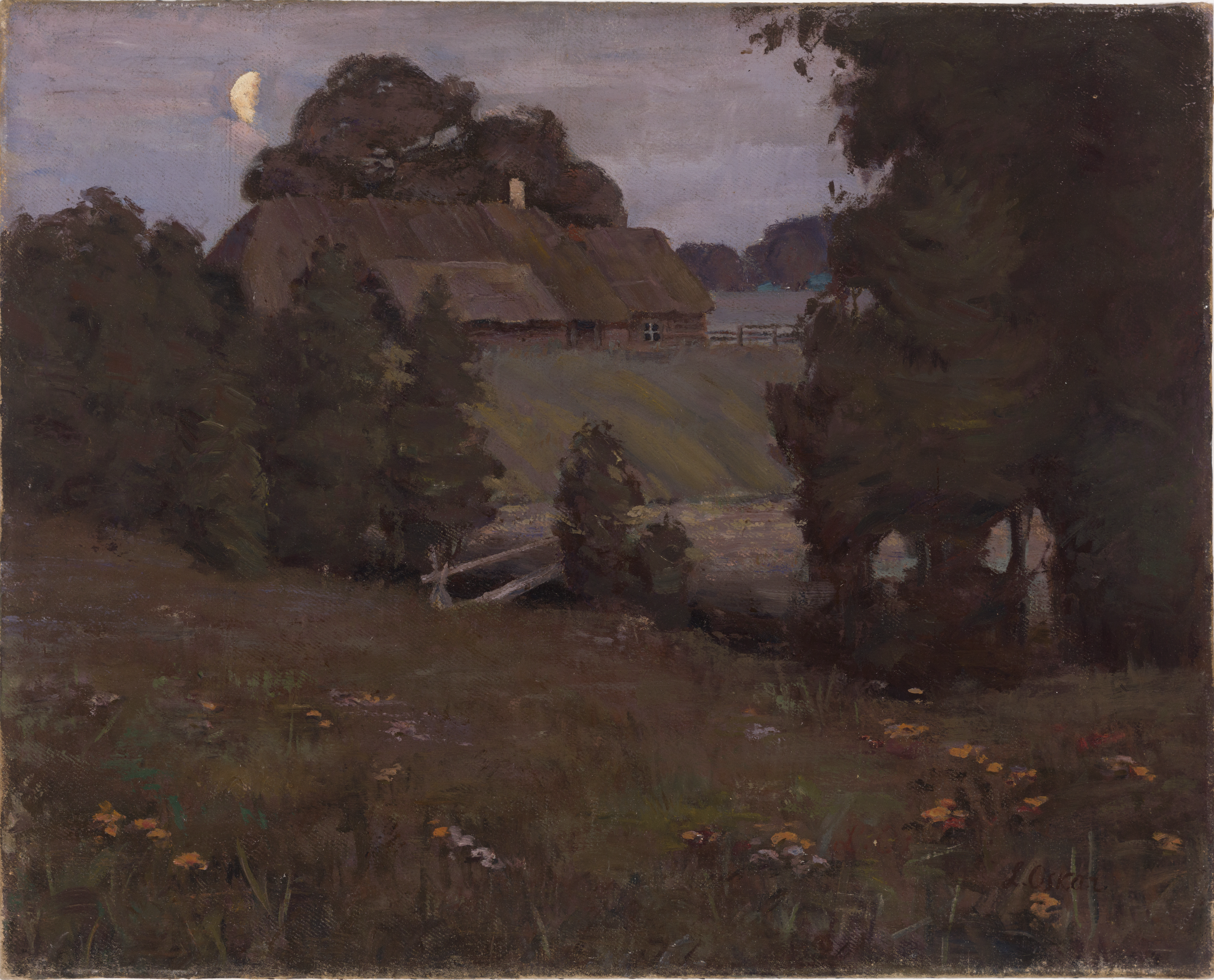
Ludvig Oskar (1874–1951). Landscape with Farmhouse and Moon. Ca. 1930s. Canvas, oil.

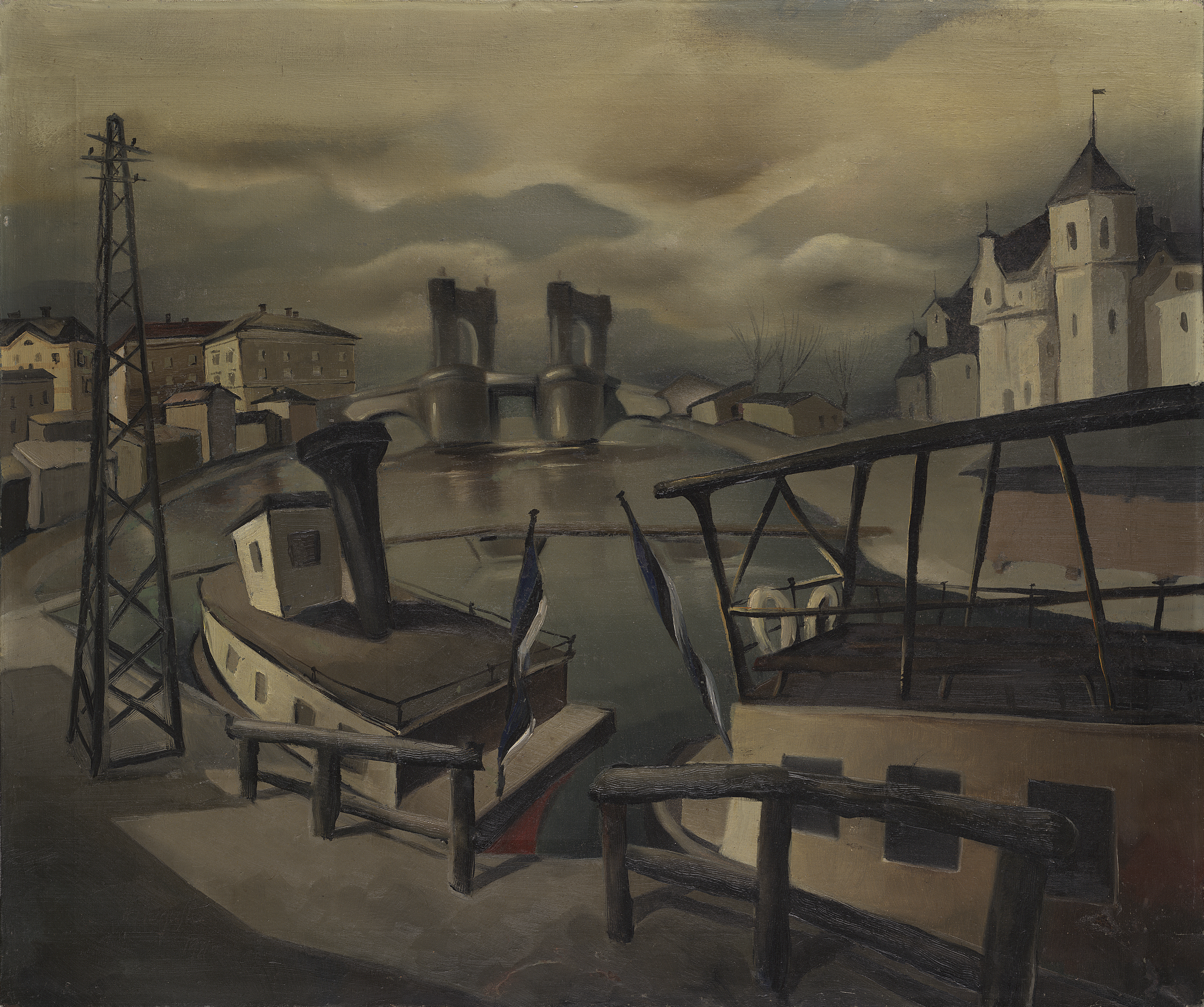
Hando Mugasto (1907–1937). Tartu Stone Bridge. 1931. Canvas, oil.

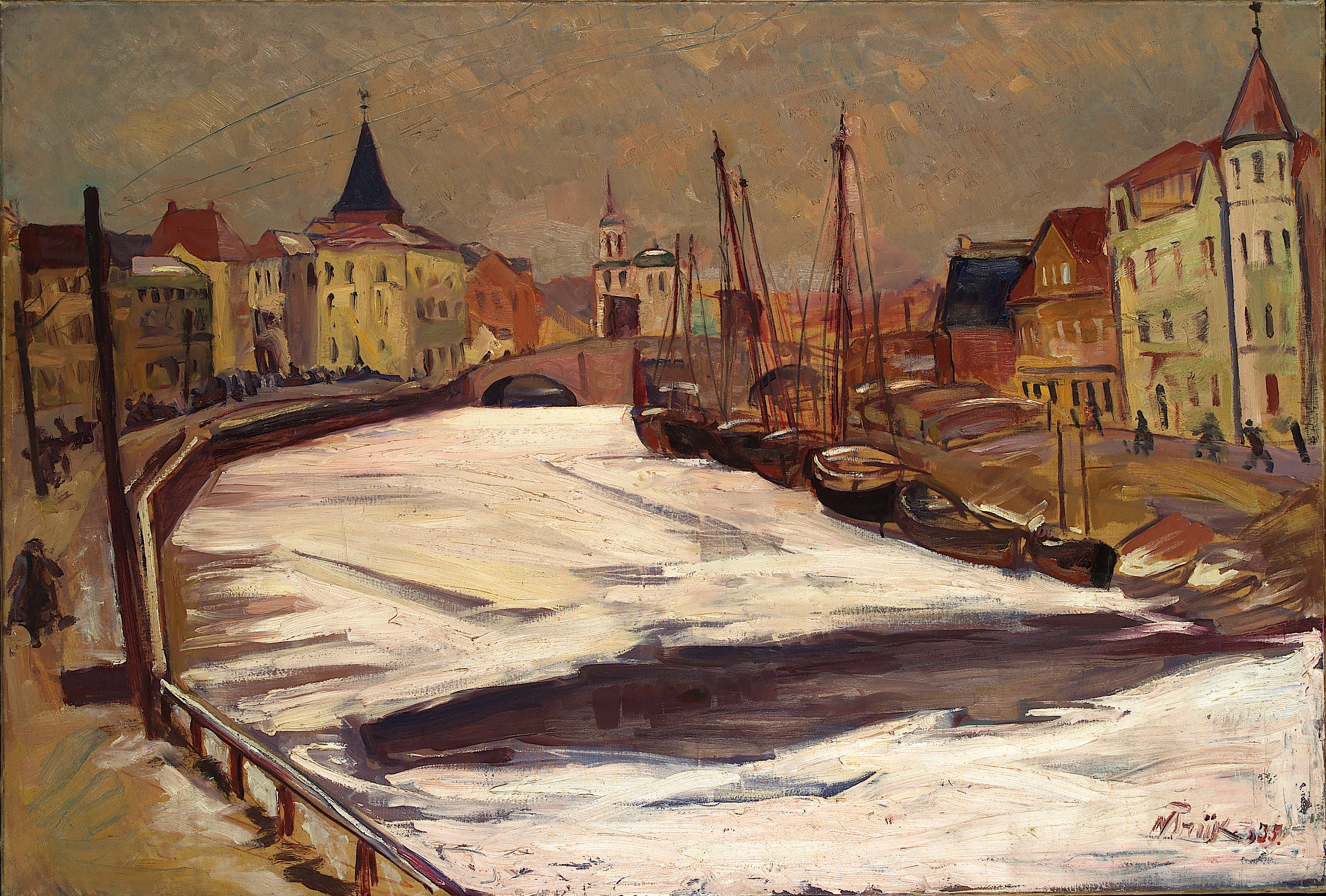
Nikolai Triik (1884‒1940). Winter in Tartu with Emajõgi. 1935. Canvas, oil.

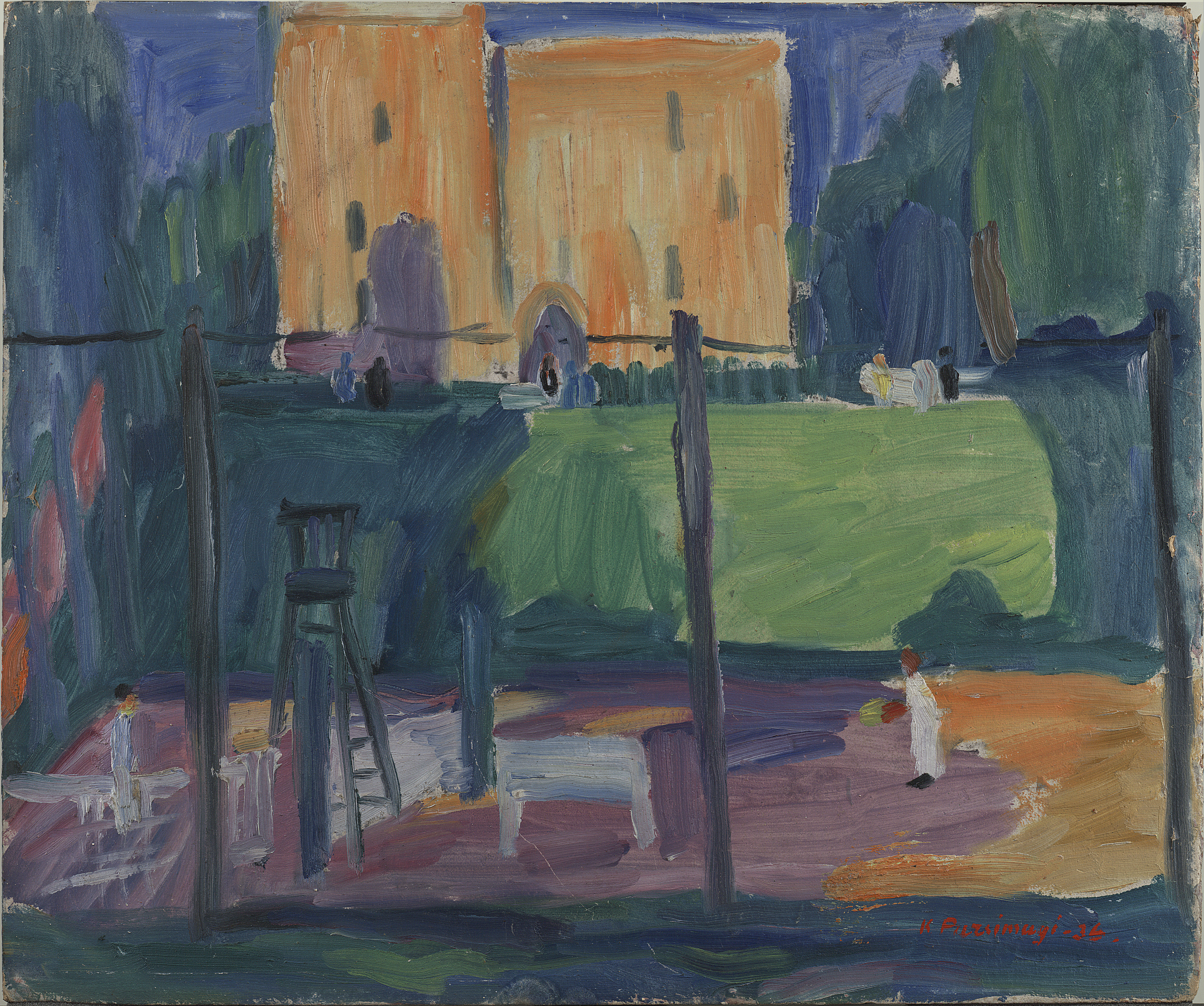
Karl Pärsimägi (1902–1942). Toomemäe Motif. 1936. Cardboard, oil.

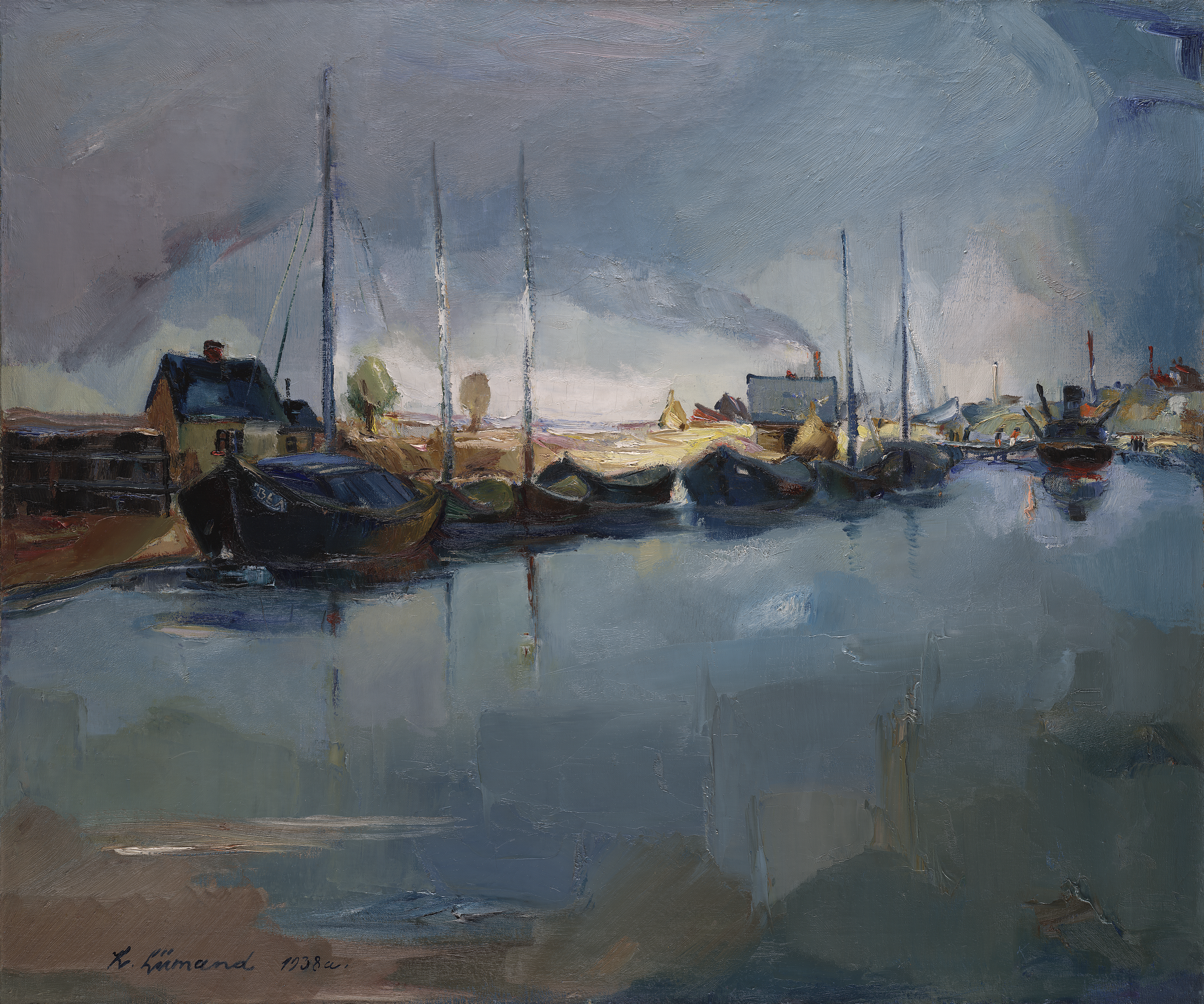
Kaarel Liimand (1906–1941). Riverboats on Emajõgi. 1938. Canvas, oil.

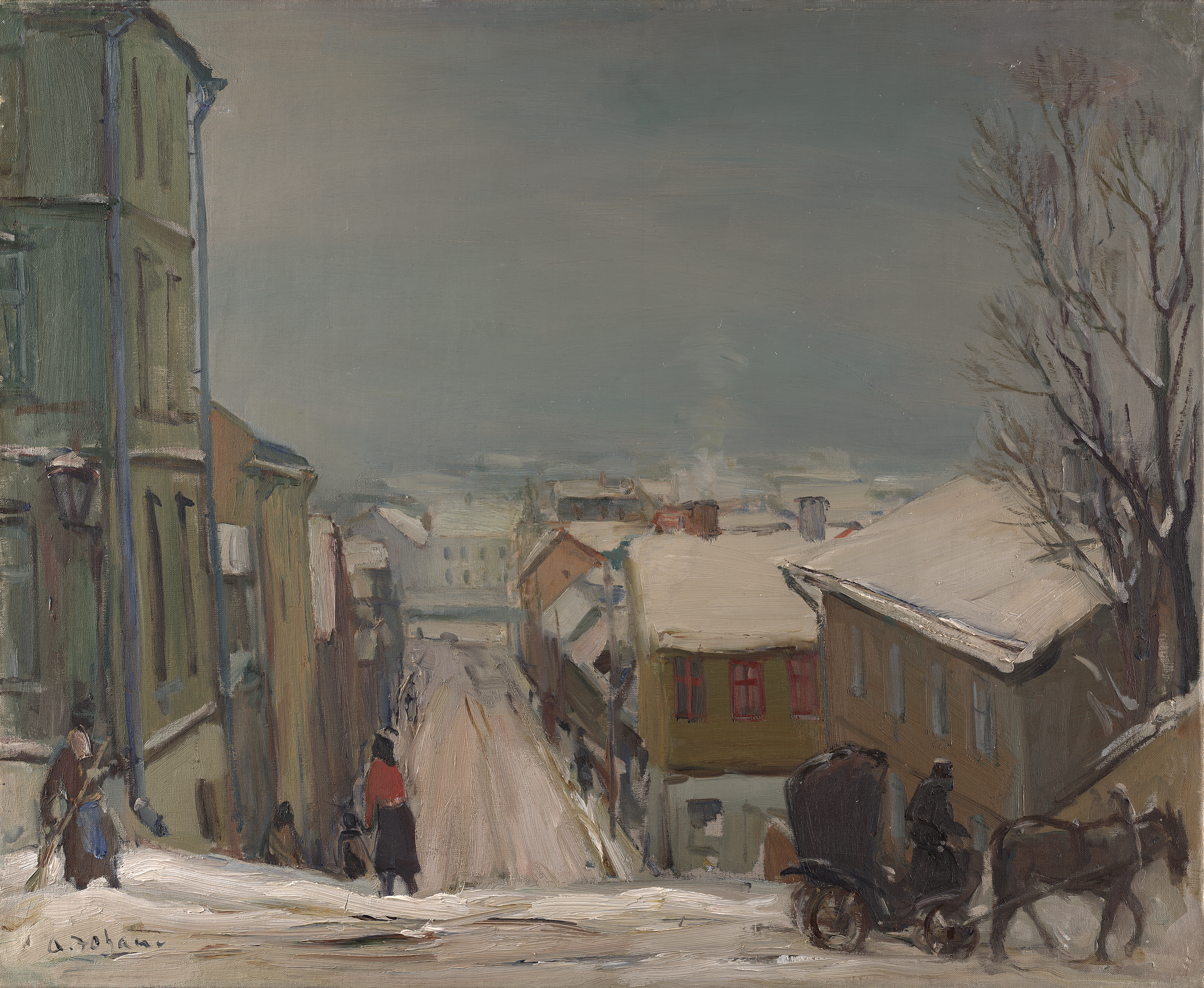
Andrus Johani (1906–1941). Winter Landscape in Tartu. 1940. Canvas, oil.

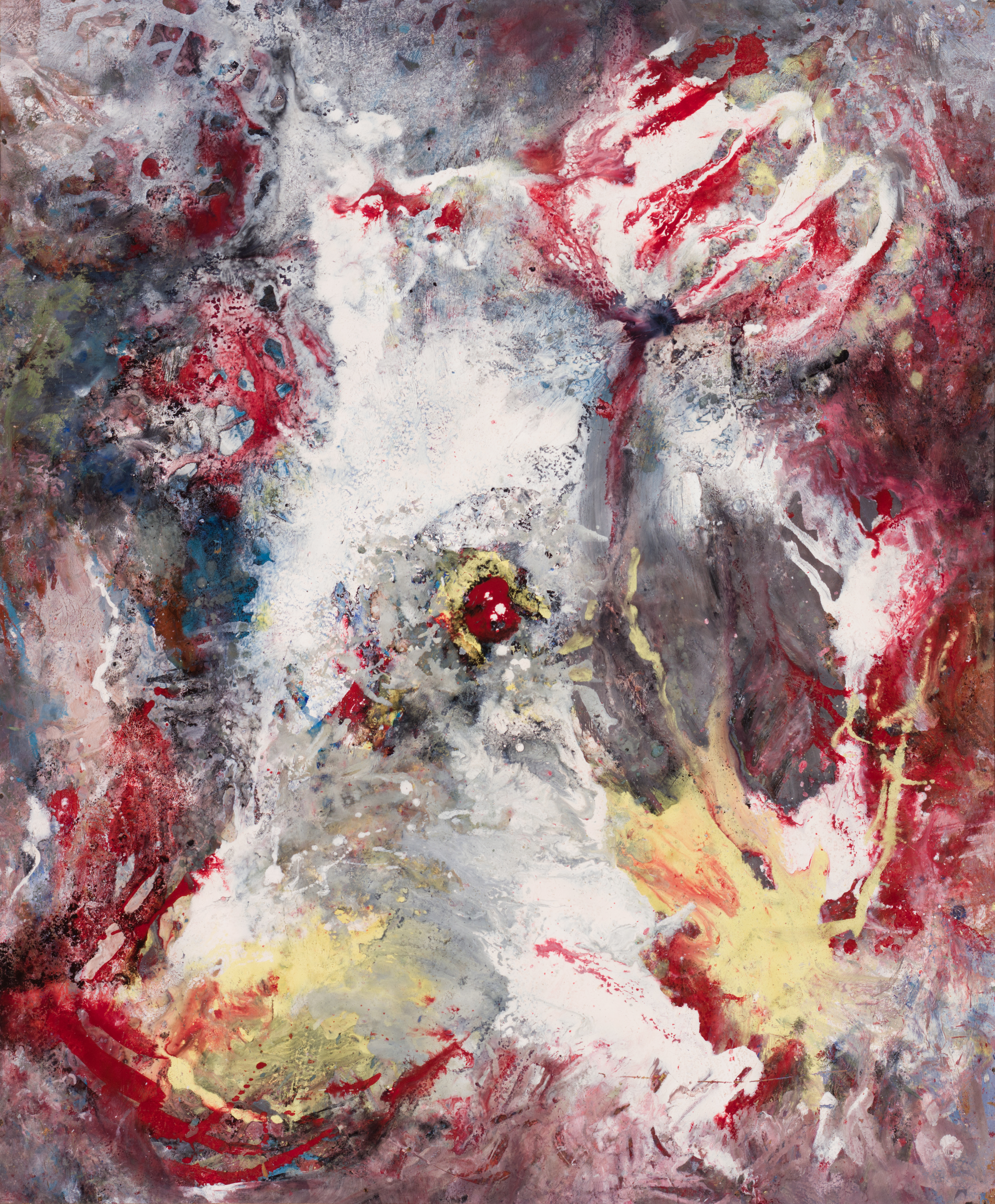
Lola Liivat (born 1928). Spring I. 1967. Cardboard, oil.

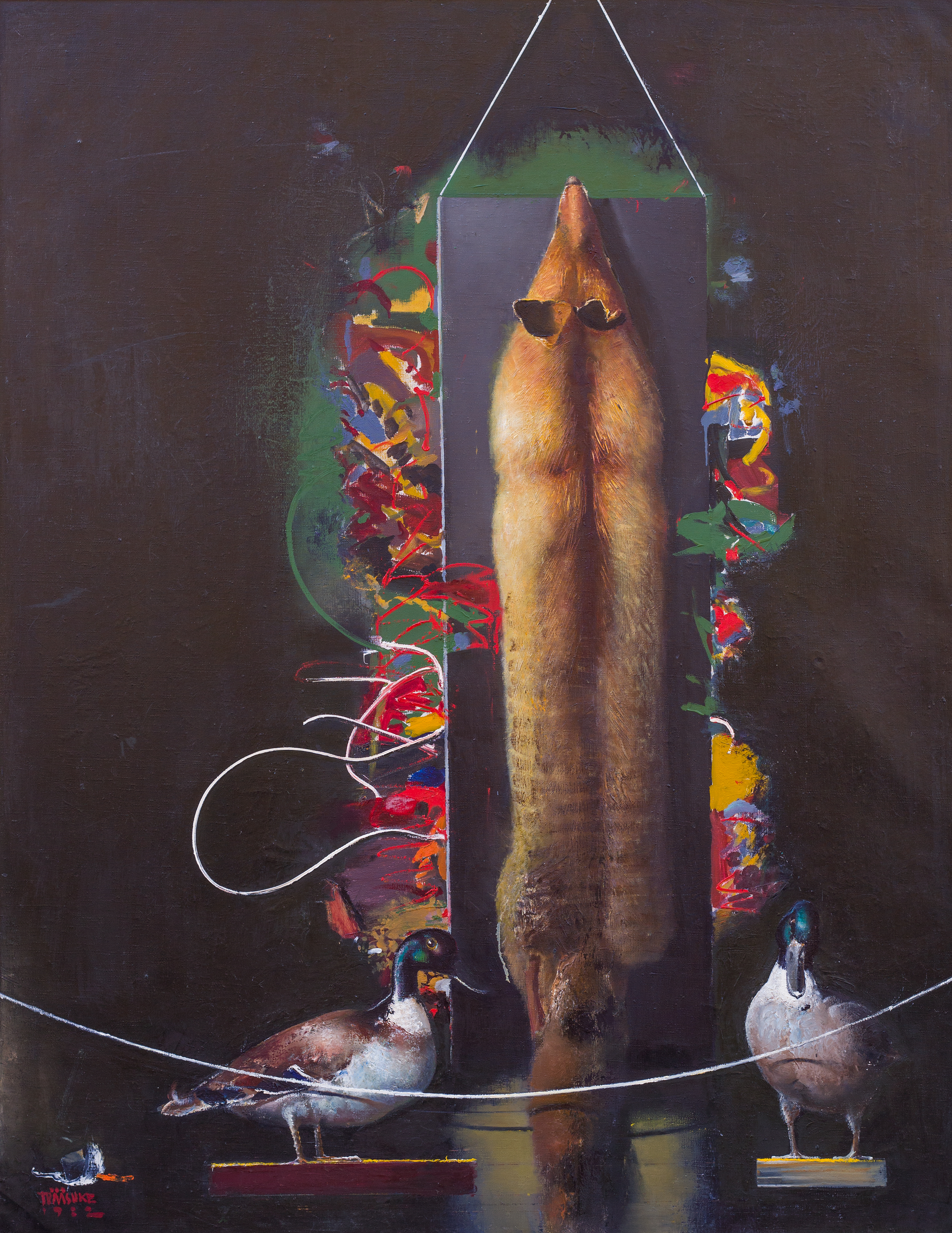
Tiit Pääsuke. (born 1941). Exposition. 1982. Canvas, oil.

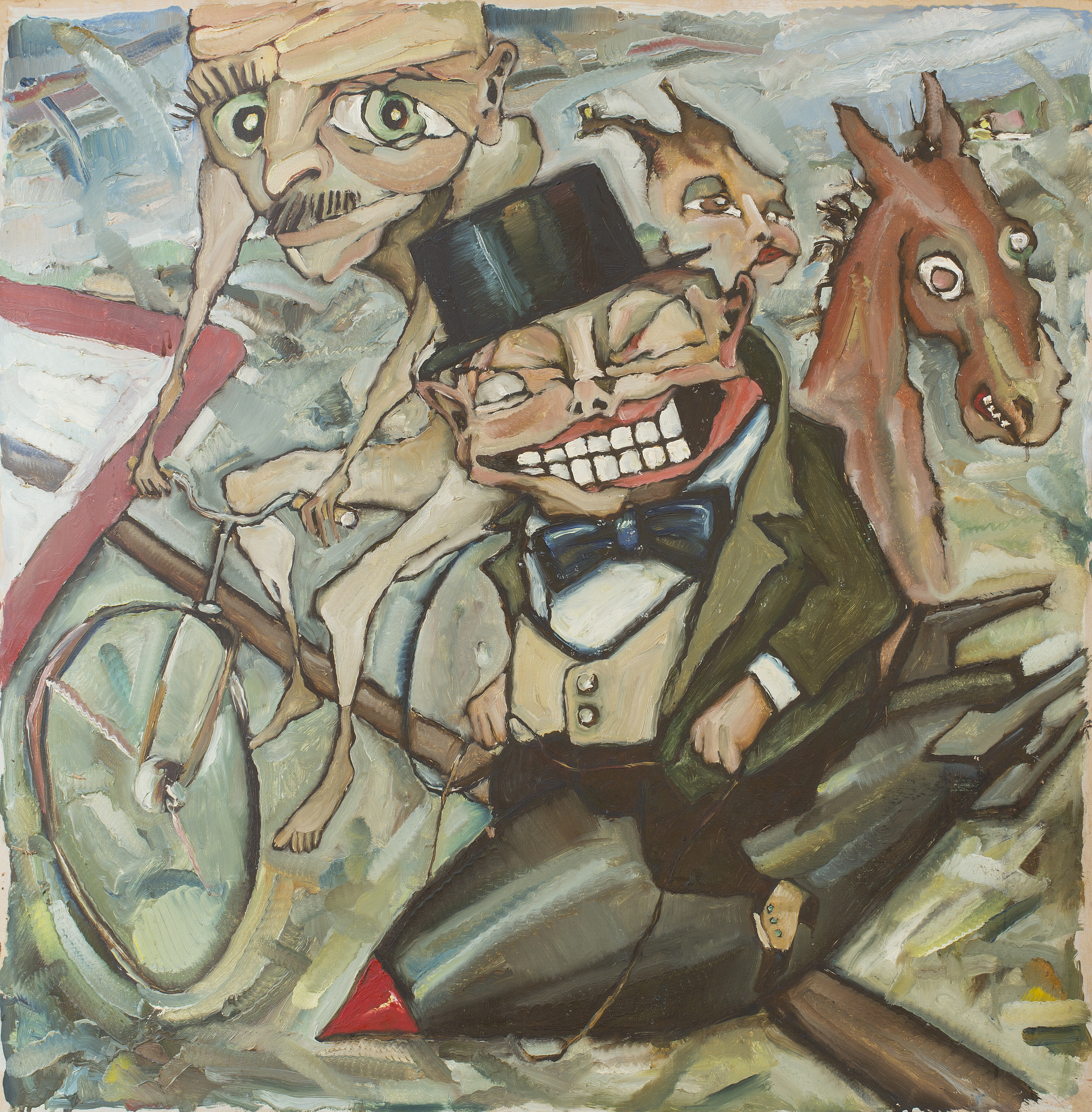
Peeter Allik (b. 1966). Political Economy. 1988. Canvas, oil.
