= Pärnu Central Library =

Library in Pärnu, Estonia

Coordinates: 58.3858°N 24.4946°E

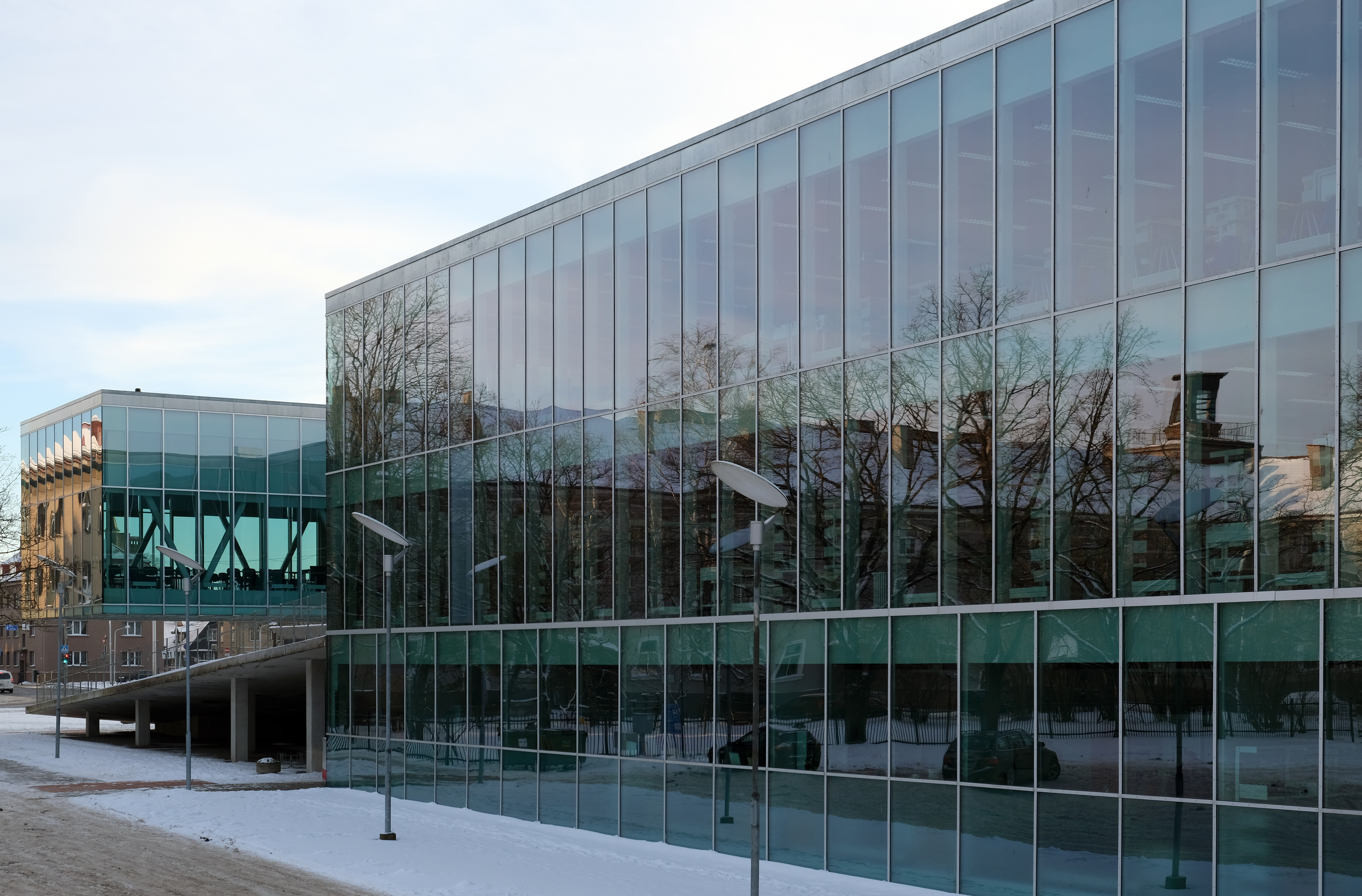
Pärnu Central Library

Pärnu Central Library (Estonian: Pärnu keskraamatukogu) is a library in Pärnu, Estonia.

The building was designed by the architectural bureau 3+1 Arhitektid. In 2008, the 3+1 Arhitektid was awarded by annual architectural prize of the Cultural Endowment of Estonia for designing the building.

The library was opened in 1909 as a library room. In 1920, the library got its own building.

== Directors ==
- 1920-1923 Mart Lekstein (Mart Lepaste)
- 1923-1945 Johannes Saar
- 1945-1954 Dagmar Bell
- 1954-1986 Ilme Kallasmaa
- 1986-2012 Saima-Õie Andla
- since 2012 Heinike Sinijärv.
