= Tallinn Central Library =

Library in Estonia

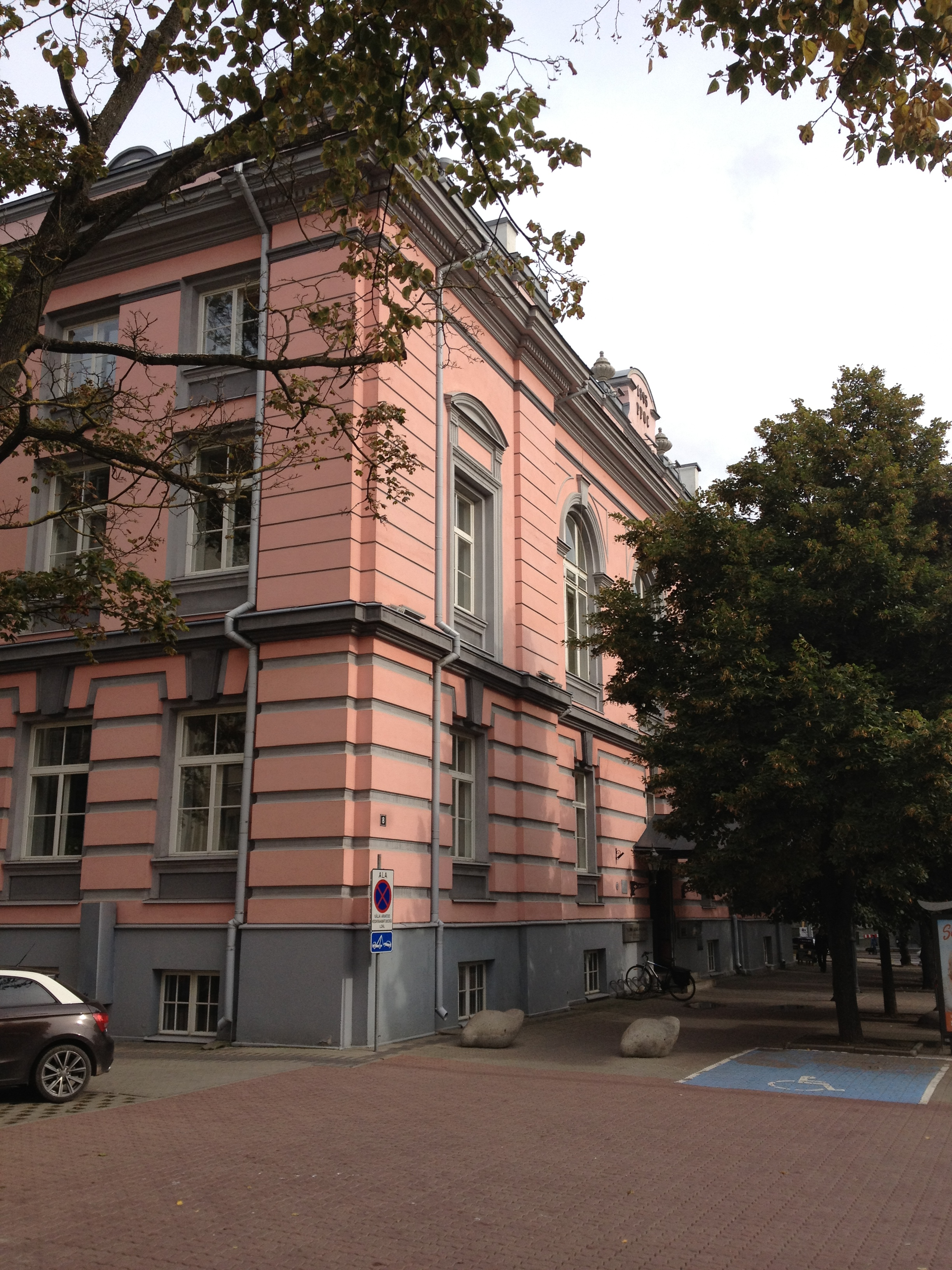
- Tallinn Central Library building
- 59.4332°N 24.7475°E
- Location: Tallinn, Estonia
- Type: Public library
- Established: October 14, 1907
- Reference to legal mandate: Public Library Act (12.11.1998)
- Branches: 17

Access and use
- Circulation: 1,695,132

Other information
- Website: Official website

Tallinn Central Library (Estonian: Tallinna Keskraamatukogu) is a library in Tallinn, the capital city of Estonia. The library was the first public library for a town in Estonia, and served as the nation's legal deposit library for ten years during its early existence. The library currently provides services to those who are unable to access a physical branch through a bookmobile, and provides access to works of modern Estonian literature via e-book throughout the world to anyone with internet access.

== History ==
It was established on 14 October 1907 as Tallinn Town Free Public Library, and was the first town library in Estonia. The library was led by Aleksander Sibul from 1921-1950, and he made it into a central library that had multiple branches and departments. Between 1938 and 1948 the library contained an active archival department that collected 40,000 units of archival materials and received the legal deposit copies for all of Estonia. The library maintained this archival material until 1951, at which time it was distributed to other libraries.

== Twenty-first century ==
In 2004 it was proposed that the library should have a bookmobile, and the library acquired one named Katarina Jee in 2008. Katarina Jee has the capacity to hold 3,800 volumes at one time and serves areas where branch libraries are absent or temporarily unavailable. The service provides books both in Russian and Estonian, with 70% of the materials being Estonian-language titles.

In 2012 the Tallinn Central Library created ELLU, an e-book lending program for works of modern Estonian literature. Tallinn Central Library is the only library in Estonia that provided copies of modern Estonian literature via e-book, and access to the ELLU system is available to anyone in the world, with registered users being reported from countries in Europe, North America, and Asia. In 2017 the library expanded their e-book offerings to allow English and Russian speaking patrons to access e-books, via OverDrive e-library. By now it also includes access to magazines. From 2020 library provides access to Naxos Music Library.
