= Helmut Piirimäe =

Estonian historian (1930–2017)

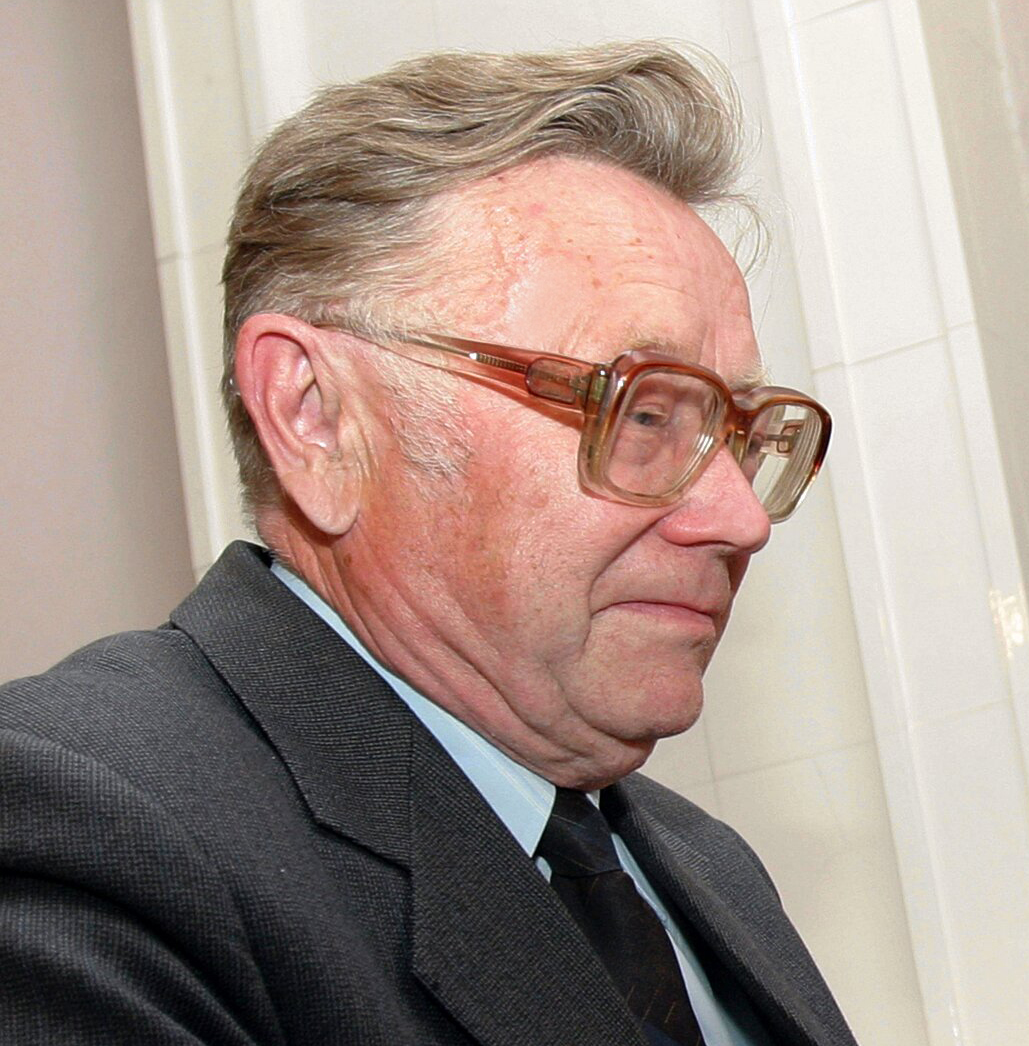
Helmut Piirimäe in 2004

Helmut Piirimäe (September 8, 1930 – 21 August 2017) was a prominent Estonian historian. He was professor emeritus of University of Tartu and an honorary doctor of University of Uppsala.

Piirimäe researched Estonian history under the Swedish Empire in the 17th century, and also the Enlightenment in the 18th century, especially the French Revolution.

Helmut Piirimäe was married to the art historian Krista Piirimäe. They had three sons and a daughter.
