= Katarina Jee =

Mobile library in Tallinn, Estonia

Katarina Jee Mobile Library
- Raamatukogubuss Katarina Jee
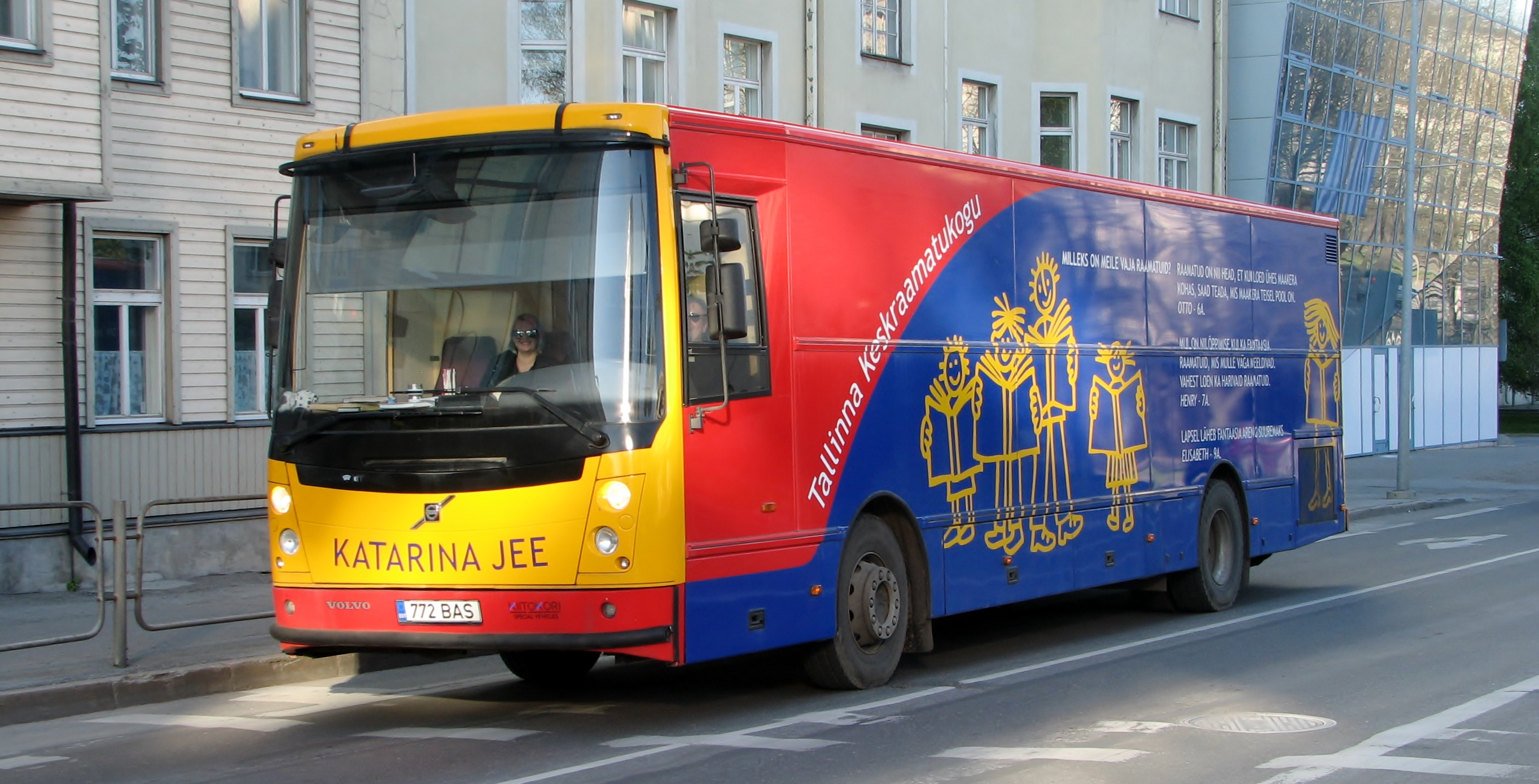
- Location: Tallinn, Estonia
- Type: Public, bookmobile library
- Established: 2008 (18 years ago)

Collection
- Size: 8000 items

Other information
- Website: www.keskraamatukogu.ee

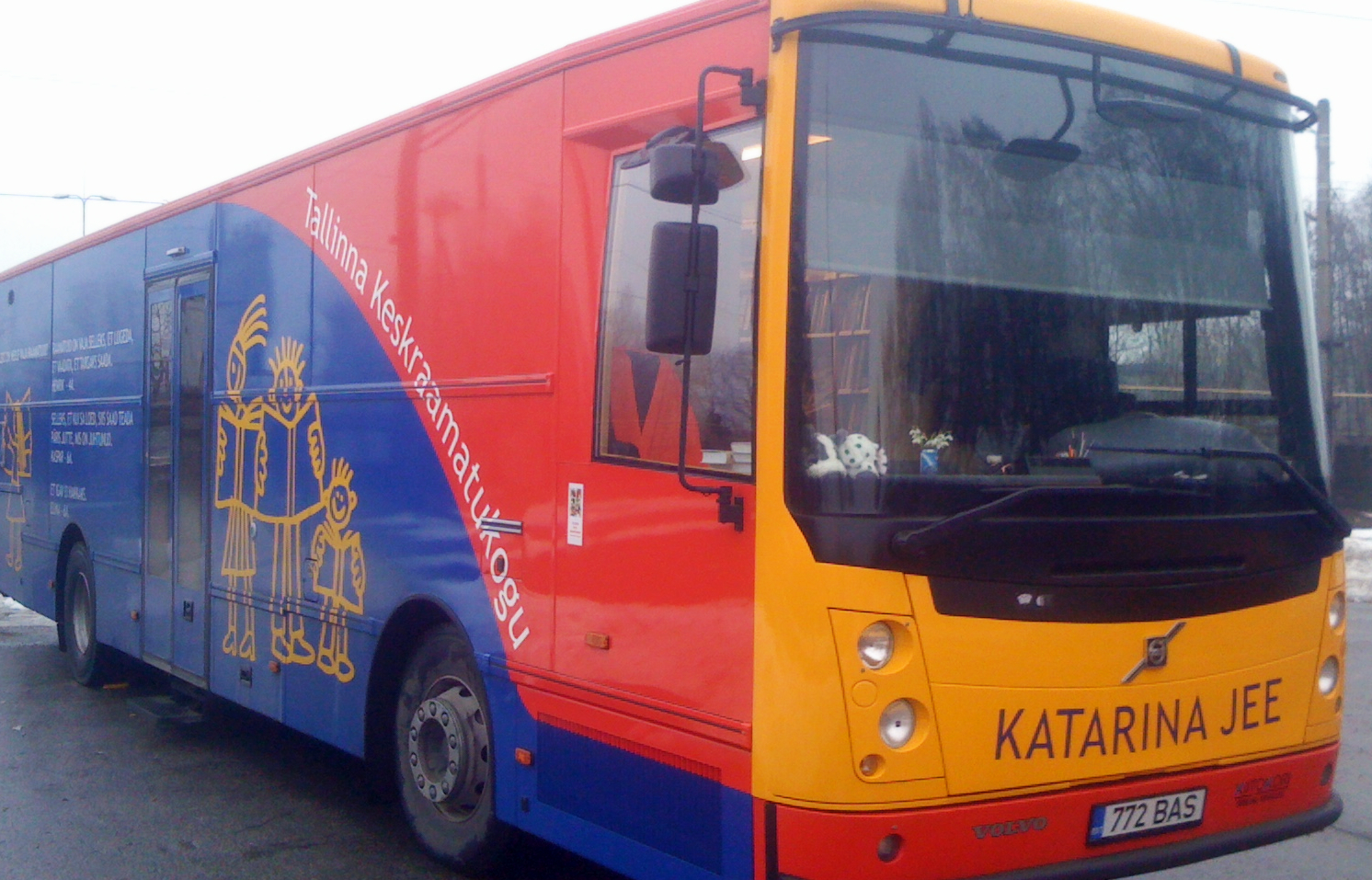
Katarina Jee Mobile Library

The Katarina Jee Mobile Library (in Estonian: Raamatukogubuss Katarina Jee) is a Tallinn Central Library bus or Bookmobile operating in Tallinn, Estonia, the first and currently only Bookmobile operating in Estonia. The bus name Katarina Jee refers to a character from the Estonian author August Gailit's novel Toomas Nipernaadi.

The library is a modified Volvo bus, customized in Finland by Kiitokori OY, which have been building such vehicles since 1965. The bus interior and exterior design is by the Tallinn Central Library artist Kertu Sillaste.

Katarina Jee Mobile Library operates from Monday to Thursday in Lasnamäe, Haabersti, Nõmme and Pirita at 26 half an hour scheduled stops. On Fridays the bus visits schools, kindergartens, youth and daycare centers and other public events.

The Katarina Jee Mobile Library carries 8000 items that can be found on the online catalogue ESTER, there is a selection of books and magazines in Estonian, Russian, English and audio books in Estonian. A valid Tallinn Central Library Card is required to borrow any materials from the bus, materials may be returned to the departments or to any branch of Tallinn Central Library.
