= Tartu Public Library =

Library in Estonia

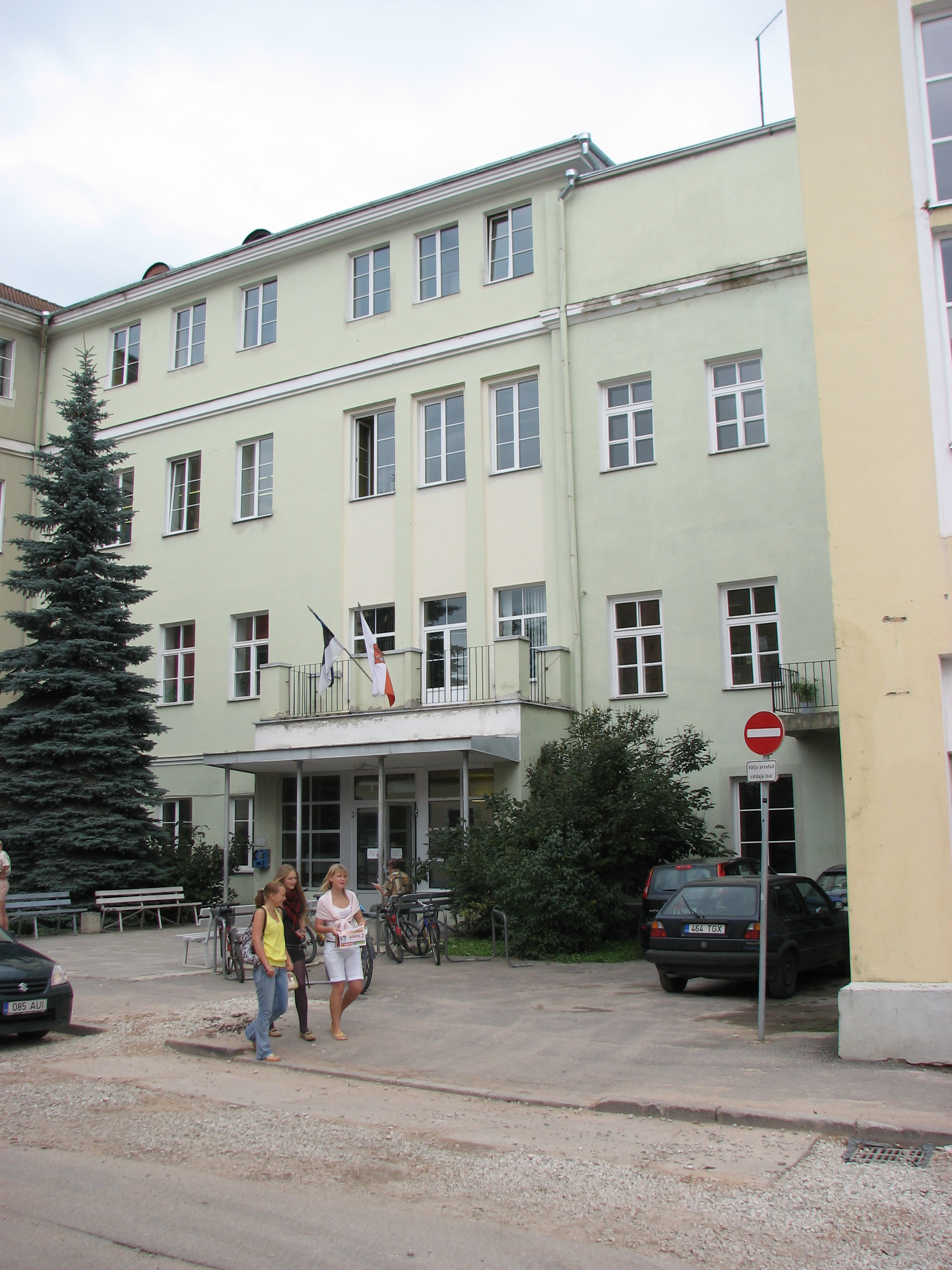
- Tartu Public Library (August 2008)
- 58°22′54″N 26°43′25″E
- Location: Tallinn, Estonia
- Type: Public library
- Established: 1913
- Reference to legal mandate: Public Library Act (12.11.1998)

Other information
- Website: www.luts.ee

Tartu Public Library (Estonian: Tartu Linnaraamatukogu) is a public library in Tartu, Estonia.

Its predecessor was the library which was established in 1913 by Tartu Rahvaraamatukogu Selts. The City Library was established in 1920. In 1928, this library was named into the Central City Library. In 1936, new rooms were finished in Kompanii Street (nowadays, the library is also located in Kompanii Street).

Between 1936 and 1937, the library has about 36,000 volumes.

Between 1952 and 1987, the library was named in honor of Nikolai Gogol (Estonian: N. V. Gogoli nimeline Tartu Linna Keskraamatukogu).

Directors:

- 1951–1975 Eljo Kaldalu
- 1975–1983 Elle Tarik
- 1983–2001 Tiit Jänese
- 2001–2020 Asko Tamme
- 2020 Piret Talur.
- 2021- Kristina Pai
