= Contemporary Art Museum of Estonia =

Museum in Tallinn, Estonia

- Eesti Kaasaegse Kunsti Muuseum (EKKM)
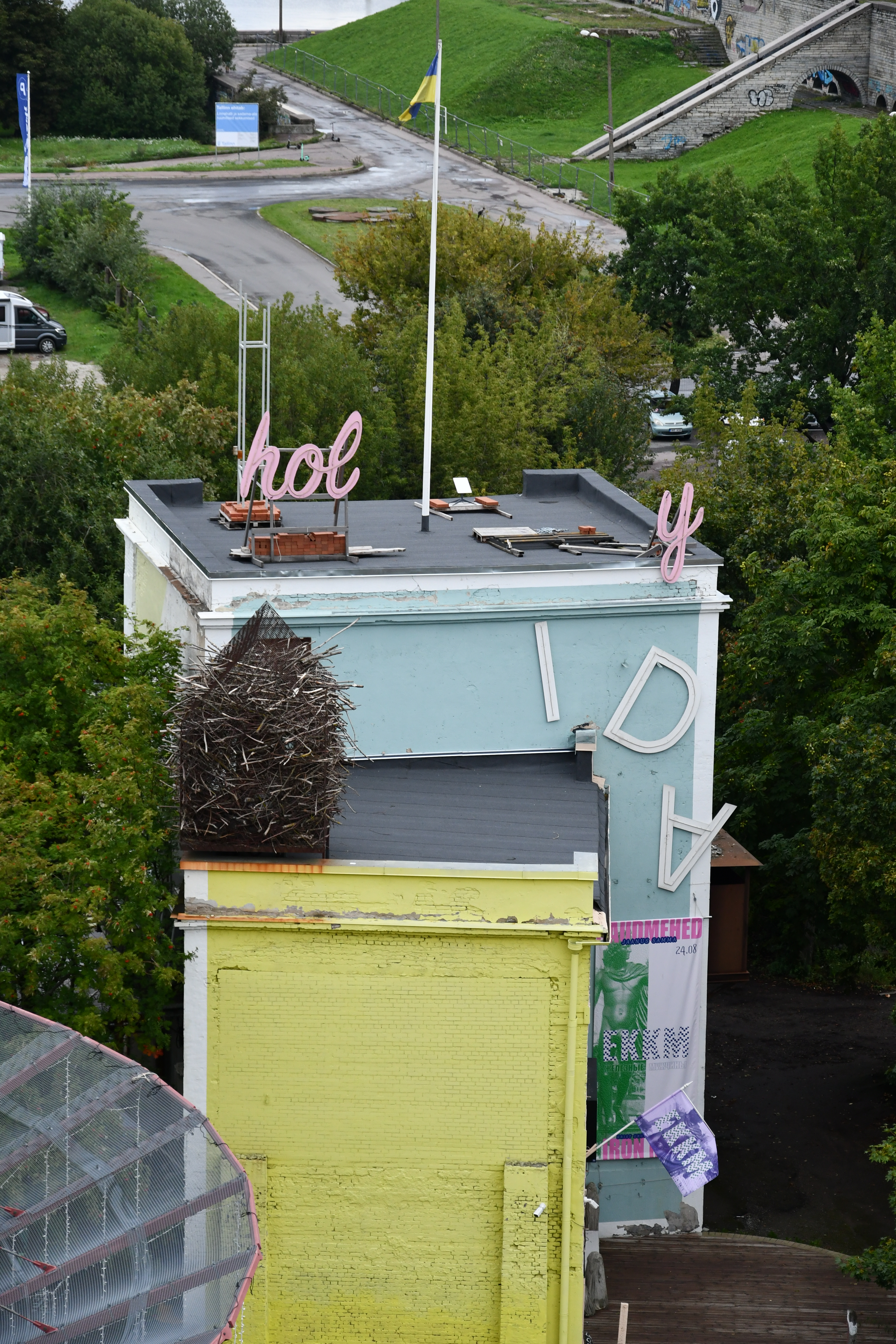
- Established: 2006
- Location: Rumbi 3, 10415 Tallinn, Estonia
- Type: Contemporary art
- Founders: Anders Härm, Elin Kard, Neeme Külm, Marco Laimre,
- Website: www.ekkm.ee

The Contemporary Art Museum of Estonia (Estonian: Eesti Kaasaegse Kunsti Muuseum, abbreviated EKKM) is a self-established, artist-run contemporary art museum in Tallinn, Estonia. EKKM was founded in 2006 by Anders Härm, Elin Kard, Neeme Külm and Marco Laimre. As an unconventional format of an institution, the organisation focuses on producing, exhibiting, collecting and initiating contemporary art. At the same time, they challenge and aim to alter the classical working methods of established art institutions.

== History ==
As a tool for self-establishment for a new generation of young artists in 2006, Anders Härm, Neeme Külm, Elin Kard and Marco Laimre squatted a part of the decommissioned ancillary building in Tallinn. Located next to the harbor and Linnahall, the building was mainly used as a place for production in the form of artist studio's. Until 2009 (the so-called ‘punk museum’ period), creation was the central use of the powerplant. The first ideas for the house were at that time drafted by Marco Laimre, Elin Kard and Neeme Külm. As a reaction on the new museum for Modern Art KUMU, EKKM decided to take up a role in showing contemporary art. From 2009 to 2016, EKKM undertook different steps, such as registering as a non-profit structure. At the same time, an agreement with the government was made for the use of the building. This allowed the organisation to obtain funding. From 2016 to 2020, the museum was led by Johannes Säre and Marten Esko. At this time, they dealt with the challenges in balancing between an recognized institution and a self-established artist-run-it-yourself experimental initiative. Since 2021, the team consists of Kadi Keskula as administrative manager, Johannes Säre as technical manager, Laura Toots as project manager / curator and Evelyn Raudsepp as creative producer.

== Program ==
EKKM has been producing exhibitions in a season that runs from April until December. Exhibitions go along with organized guided tours and an extensive audio guide. In 2011, the museum initiated and is since then the founder and host of the Köler Prize, which takes place yearly and is accompanied by an exhibition of the nominees. In 2021, EKKM opened the season with RESKRIPT (Maarin Mürk and Henri Hütt). After an invitation of the museum, the production platform turned the space into a chain of art storage spaces with the artist-run museum's collection. This happened in the framework of a research about a collection in a museum such as EKKM, restructuring it and developing new collections and suggestions for advanced, experimental collecting principles. The research was translated in a series of guided tours and a video.

The internal and external changes of EKKM in the past year shaped the exhibition "Letters from a foreign mind". Curated by Laura Toots, it revolves around values of our current society and topics such as scarcity, neglect and care. It wonders what is remembered, forgotten, and what finds its place into art history.

This was followed by the exhibition Excess and Refusal, curated by Keiu Krikmann. The exhibition deals with the notions of excess and refusal, which are approached as a contingent pair. Experienced in both artistic and lived practices, excess is often received through refusal and vice versa.

The beginning of autumn 2021, EKKM hosted the main exhibition of the sixth Tallinn Photomonth biennial. Curated by the Creative Association of Curators TOK (Anna Bitkina and Maria Veits), the network of exhibitions was centered around the concept of intensive places and showed work of 13 artists, Estonian as well as international.

The season of 2021 closed with the solo-show of Edith Karslon. Under the exhibition title "Return To Innocence", the three floors of the museum are transformed spaces filled with unexpected objects (terracotta portraits, a small Christ, orchids and birds, with music of Enya). The exhibition is curated by Eero Epner and includes artworks from the Art Museum of Estonia, the Estonian History Museum, Tartu City Museum and the archaeological research collection of the University of Tallinn.

== Building ==
EKKM is located in the former ancillary building of the city of Tallinn. The space includes three exhibition floors and the offices and workshop of the museum. Apart from that, it accommodates the bookshop of "Lugemik Publishing" and the café "Wrap 'N' Roll". In 2020, EKKM started a public garden next to the house, which permanently exhibits a selection of artworks from the collection.
