= Enno Ootsing =

Estonian artist

- Born: 18 April 1940 (age 86); Räpina, Estonia
- Education: Tartu Art School (1961); State Art Institute of the Estonian SSR (1966)
- Awards: Riga I Triennial of Miniature Prints award (1983)

Enno Ootsing (born 18 April 1940) is an Estonian artist and academic. He has worked as a freelance graphic artist and designer, book artist and illustrator. In 1980, he became a lecturer at the Estonian Academy of Arts, and from 1984 until 2005, he was a professor and head of the graphics department of the institute. Since 2007 he has been a professor emeritus at the institute.

== Early life and education ==
Enno Ootsing was born in Räpina. His father was a non-commissioned officer in the Estonian War of Independence and received a plot of land in Alamõisa for his participation in the war, where he built a home. Ootsing attended schools in Räpina, graduating from Räpina Secondary School in 1958. Afterwards, he enrolled at the Tartu Art School, graduating in 1961 with a degree in painting and art pedagogy. In 1966 he graduated from the State Art Institute of the Estonian SSR (now, the Estonian Academy of Arts) in Tallinn with a degree in graphic design.

== Career ==
=== Art ===
In 1964, Ootising was a cofounder of the influential art collective ANK '64, with other young artists who received art education at the State Art Institute of the Estonian SSR (ERKI), which included Tõnis Vint, Malle Leis, Jüri Arrak, Kristiina Kaasik, Tiiu Pallo-Vaik, Vello Tamm, Marju Mutsu, Tõnis Laanemaa, Anu Liivak, Sigrid Saarep, and Aili Vint. The group were strongly interested in youth culture, jazz, op art and pop art, but didn't share a predominant cohesive artistic style. Members of the group were not only active as artists, but also organized and attended lectures on foreign artists and their activities. Their activities aroused suspicion by Soviet authorities and the group were frequently monitored by the KGB. ANK' 64 disbanded in 1969 and is credited as playing an important part in renewing the contemporary art scene in Estonia in the 1960s.

Since the mid-1960s, Ootsing has had numerous group and solo exhibitions, both nationally and internationally. Although he has worked in a variety of mediums, he prefers to work in monotyping and automatic drawing. He is also known for his work in watercolor. His most recent solo exhibition, Juured ja võrsed. Album, dedicated one-hundred works of visual art to the 100th Anniversary of the Estonian Republic, with an emphasis on Võrumaa was held in Võru and Tartu in 2018.

He has worked extensively as a graphic artist and graphic designer and has become well known as a book designer and illustrator; beginning in the early 1970s, he has designed and illustrated books written by A. H. Tammsaare, Jaan Kaplinski, Eduard Vilde, Eno Raud, Mats Traat, Paul-Eerik Rummo, Viivi Luik, Arvo Valton, Friedrich Issak, William Golding, Arthur van Schendel, Alexander Blok, Ingmar Bergman, Vladislav Titov, and Rachel de Queiroz.

From 1965 until 1972 he worked as an artist and designer for the magazine Kultuur ja Elu. From 1972 until 1976, he was the executive secretary of the Estonian Artists' Union. From 1976 until 1980 he was a freelance artist.

=== Educator ===
In 1980, he became a lecturer at the State Art Institute of the Estonian SSR. In 1982 he was elected head of the graphics department of the institute. He was a professor at the institute until retiring in 2005 (renamed the Estonian Academy of Arts). Since 2007, he has been a professor emeritus with the academy.

== Awards and acknowledgements ==
- Meritorious Artist of the Estonian SSR (1983)
- Riga I Triennial of Miniature Prints award (1983)
