= Malle Leis =

Estonian artist

- Born: 7 July 1940; Viljandi, Estonia
- Died: 9 August 2017 (aged 77)
- Resting place: Forest Cemetery, Tallinn
- Known for: Painting
- Spouse: Villu Jõgeva
- Awards: Order of the White Star, IV Class (2001)

Malle Leis (7 July 1940 – 9 August 2017) was an Estonian painter and graphic artist. Her works mostly represent abstract forms in nature, including flowers, fruits, and vegetables. She developed a silk screen technique that became her trademark.

== Early life and education ==
Malle Leis was born on July 7, 1940, in the town Viljandi, Estonia, a country on the Baltic Sea across from Finland. Leis began her education at the Tartu Art School attending from 1958 to 1961 and attended the Estonian Academy of Arts (also called Art Institute of Tallinn, see Wiki for associated names in past) from 1961 to 1967. Leis graduated from the stage design department in 1967 and was able to be recognized as one of the original members of ANK '64.

In 1964, a group of young artists in Tallinn formed an organization called ANK '64. Original members of ANK' 64 included students of the art institute, Malle Leis, Tõnis Vint, Jüri Arrak, Kristiina Kaasik, Tõnis Laanemaa, Marju Mutsu, Enno Ootsing, Tiiu Pallo-Vaik, Vello Tamm, and Aili Vint. The small group aimed to hold exhibitions outside the official system, to change theoretical ideas, and to organize private seminars on modern art. Each of these goals were being neglected by the art institute, and ANK '64 worked to change that. The small group influenced many younger beginner artists. Many artists argued that ANK '64 played more of a role in artistic development than the institute would have. Over the years, ANK '64 offered various intense exhibitions, lectures, performances, and other activities to young students. With being involved in this group, Leis became very familiar with Western contemporary art. Leis preferred working in abstract in the early sixties, but eventually developed an interest in pop art towards the end of the decade.

== Artwork ==
=== Mediums ===
Leis typically worked with oil, watercolor, and serigraphs, establishing herself not only as a painter, but also as a printmaker.

=== Styles in the 1960s ===
Leis' was highly influenced when being part of ANK '64, and mostly worked with an abstraction in the beginning of her career, but quickly moved to pop art style by the end of the 1960s. One of her early works was Exchange, a piece using oil and watch parts on canvas, done in 1968. Leis combined a background of geometric forms with pop elements. The juxtaposition of geometry and pop show Leis' knowledge and influence from Western contemporary art. The two male heads in the painting are portraits of her husband, Villu Jõvega.

=== Styles in the 1970s and 1980s ===
Leis began to paint large and bright flowers and vegetables in the 1970s, occasionally adding in human figures or horses. Leis' 1972 painting Sunlight Triptych shows striking red poppies and yellow daffodils against a flat blue background. She was likely inspired by Andy Warhol's 1964 series, Flowers, but still has her own unique style by painting a more detailed flower. In Leis' 1977 painting The Longest Day, Leis stretches tulips across the black canvas and places a human head in the bottom corner. The flowers are larger than the head, creating a dominant presence. The colorful flowers form an idea of life and happiness, but the head in the corner has been reduced to an object, simply gazing into space with an emotionless stare. These styles continued into the early 1980s. Leis began working with watercolors and silk screening in this time as well. Leis' husband helped her to develop her silk screening process, in which she would use ten to twenty different colors in each print. Her screen printed works had oriental resemblances, possibly inspired by Japanese artist Ogata Kōrin. Leis' screen printing technique quickly became her trademarked style.

== Awards ==
=== Order of the White Star ===
Leis was awarded the Order of the White Star, IV Class in 2001. The Order of the White Star was instituted in 1936 to commemorate the fight of the Estonian people for freedom. The Order of the White Star is bestowed on Estonian citizens to give recognition for services rendered in state public service or local government and on foreigners for services rendered to the Estonian state.

== List of exhibitions and collections ==
=== Selected one-person exhibitions (1968-1989, 2014) ===
- 1968: Art Salon, Estonian Union of Artists, Tallinn, Estonia
- 1973: House of Artists, Estonian Union of Artists, Tartu, Estonia
- 1974: Theater Lydia Koidula, Parnu, Estonia
- 1975: Art Salon, Estonian Union of Artists, Tallinn, Estonia
- 1975: Gallery Arsenal Zapiecek, Ponsan, Poland
- 1975: Gallery Arsenal Zapiecek, Warsaw, Poland
- 1980: Museum of Art, Tallinn, Estonia
- 1981: Russian Images, ltd., Pittsburgh, Pennsylvania, US
- 1984: Draakon Gallery, Tallinn, Estonia
- 1984: Galerie im Zentrum, Luckenwalde, East Germany
- 1984: International Images, ltd., Sewickley, Pennsylvania, US
- 1988: Akademgorodok, Novosibirsk, Russia
- 1988: Audiovisual Gallery, Limerick, Ireland
- 1988: University of Tartu, Tartu, Estonia
- 1989: Harjupaviljonki, Heinola, Finland
- 1989: International Images, ltd., Sewickley, Pennsylvania, US - This exhibition held sixty of Leis' works, including oils, watercolors, and serigraphs. At the time, it was the most extensive collection of Leis' art ever shown in the United States.
- 2014-2015: Tartu Art Museum, Tartu, Estonia - This exhibition was open for about three months and featured an overview of Leis' artwork.

=== Selected group exhibitions (1970-1989) ===
- 1970: First Riga Watercolor Triennial, Riga, Latvia
- 1971: II Graphics Triennial, Tallinn, Estonia
- 1972: International Biennial of Graphic Art, Krakow, Poland
- 1972: Graphics of Estonia, Italy
- 1978: International Meeting of Fine Art Dealers, Washington, D.C., US
- 1978: Lazarus Assembly Centre, Ohio, US
- 1978: Pratt Institute Gallery, New York, US
- 1978: Pratt Manhattan Center, New York, US
- 1978: Russian Images, ltd., Sewickley, Pennsylvania, US
- 1979: Boston World Art Exhibition, Boston, Massachusetts, US
- 1979: Fourth Riga Watercolor Triennial, Tallinn, Estonia
- 1979: International Meeting of Fine Art Dealers, Washington, D.C., US
- 1979: St. Mary's College, St. Mary's City, Maryland, US
- 1980: Center Gallery, Lewisburg, Pennsylvania, US
- 1980: Georgia Southern College, Statesboro, Georgia, US
- 1980: V Graphics Triennial, Tallinn, Estonia
- 1980: International Art Exposition, New York, US
- 1980: Kilcawley Center Art Gallery, Youngstown, Ohio, US
- 1980: Western Carolina University, Cullouhee, US
- 1981: Augusta College, Augusta, Georgia, US
- 1981: Austin College, Sherman, Texas, US
- 1981: International Art Exposition, New York, US
- 1981: International Biennial of Graphic Art and Painting, West Germany
- 1981: University Museum, Oxford, Mississippi, US
- 1982: Association for the Advancement of Baltic Studies, St. Paul, Minnesota, US
- 1982: Center Gallery, Lewisburg, Pennsylvania, US
- 1982: Contemporary Russian Art Center of America, New York, US
- 1982: Fifth Riga Watercolor Triennial, Riga, Latvia
- 1982: Georgia Southwestern College, Americus, Georgia, US
- 1982: International Images, ltd., Sewickley, Pennsylvania, US
- 1982: Lutheran Brotherhood Gallery, Minneapolis, Minnesota, US
- 1982: McKissick Museum, Columbia, South Carolina, US
- 1982: Santa Fe Community College, Gainesville, Florida, US
- 1982: Northern Arizona University, Flagstaff, Arizona, US
- 1983: Hunt Institute for Botanical Documentation, Pittsburgh, Pennsylvania, US
- 1983: VI Graphics Triennial, Tallinn, Estonia, US
- 1983: Washington Cathedral, Washington, D.C., US
- 1984: The Arts Club of Washington, Washington, D.C., US
- 1984: Chicago International Art Exposition, Chicago, Illinois, US
- 1984: Glen Helene Association, Yellow Springs, Ohio, US
- 1984: Missoula Museum of Arts, Missoula, Montana, US
- 1984: The Paine Art Center, Oshkosh, Wisconsin, US
- 1984: Thames Science Center, New London, Connecticut, US
- 1984: Strybing Arboretum, San Francisco, California, US
- 1984-1985: Kunstverein für die Rheinlande und Westfalen und Städtische Kunsthalle, Düsseldorf, West Germany
- 1985: Grinnell College, Grinnell, Iowa, US
- 1985: Kunstverein Hannover, Hannover, West Germany
- 1985: Muckenthaler Cultural Center, Fullerton, California, US
- 1985: Rauma 85 Biennial, Rauma, Finland
- 1985: Santa Cruz City Museum, Santa Cruz, California, US
- 1985: Staatsgalerie Stuttgart, Stuttgart, West Germany
- 1985: Szepmuveszeti Museum, Budapest, Hungary
- 1985: University of Colorado Museum, Boulder, Colorado, US
- 1986: VII Graphics Triennial, Tallinn, Estonia
- 1986: Kieler Stadtmuseum, Kiel, West Germany
- 1988: Indiana University Art Museum, Bloomington, Indiana, US
- 1988: Sydney, Australia
- 1989: Cultural Center, Trento, Italy
- 1989: VII Graphics Triennial, Tallinn, Estonia
- 1989: Melbourne, Australia

=== Selected museum collections ===
- Cremona Foundation, Maryland, US
- Estonian Art Museum, Tallinn, Estonia
- Grinnell College, Grinnell, Iowa, US
- Hunt Institute for Botanical Documentation, Pittsburgh, Pennsylvania, US
- Library of Congress, Washington, D.C., US
- Museum of Art, Tartu, Estonia
- Museum of Modern Art, New York, US
- Museum Lodz, Lodz, Poland
- Museum Ludwig, Cologne, West Germany
- Museum Narodowe We Wroclawiu, Warsaw, Poland
- Pushkin Museum of Fine Arts, Moscow, Russia
- Szepmuveszeti Museum, Budapest, Hungary
- The Russian Museum, Leningrad, Russia
- The Tretyakov Gallery, Moscow, Russia
