= Vint (disambiguation) =

Vint is a Russian card game.

Vint may also refer to:

- Vint (given name), a masculine given name
- Vint (play), a 1985 short play
- Vint (surname), a surname
