= ANK '64 =

Estonian artist group

ANK '64 was an Estonian artist collective active in the years 1964 to 1969 in Tallinn.

The group included originally 10 artists: Jüri Arrak, Kristiina Kaasik, Tõnis Laanemaa, Malle Leis, Marju Mutsu, Enno Ootsing, Tiiu Pallo-Vaik, Vello Tamm, Aili Vint and Tõnis Vint. The group did not practice any specific style of art, but recognized as works of art anything related to modern youth culture such as pop-art. Members of the group were not only active as artists, but also organized and attended lectures on foreign artists and their activities. Members of the group were involved in the Leningrad and Moscow underground non-conformist art movement.

The first group exhibition was held in 1964 on the premises of the Estonian Theatre. A retrospective of their work 50 years after they first gathered was held in the Tallinn Art Hall from 6 November-15 December 2013. Many of the original artists were still active at the time and showed their recent work in addition to a historical overview.
