= Karlova, Tartu =

Neighbourhood of Tartu

Coordinates: 58°22′0.55″N 26°44′4.2″E

Karlova
- Neighbourhood of Tartu
- Drone video of Karlova in Tartu (September 2021)
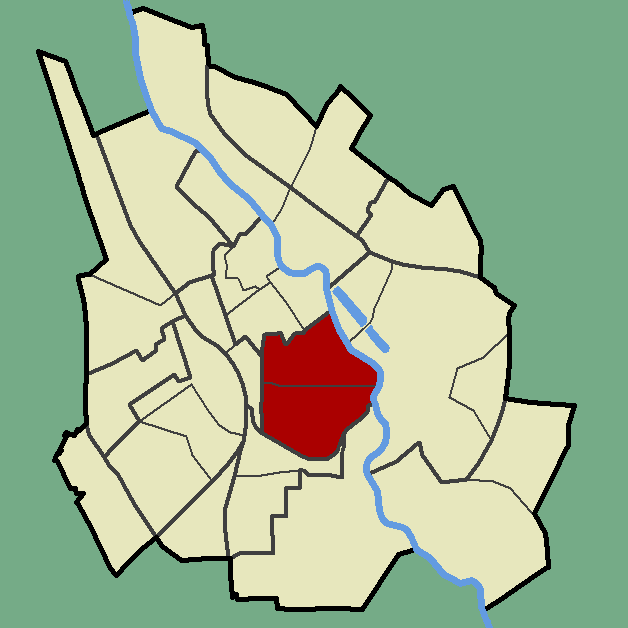
- Location of Karlova in Tartu.
- Country: Estonia
- County: Tartu County
- City: Tartu

Area
  - Total: 2.30 km^{2} (0.89 sq mi)

Population (31.12.2013)
  - Total: 8,856
  - Density: 3,850/km^{2} (9,970/sq mi)
- Website: www.karlova.ee

Karlova is a neighbourhood of Tartu, Estonia. It has a population of 8,856 (as of 31 December 2013) and an area of 2.30 km^{2} (0.89 mi^{2}).

== History ==
Excavations in the Karlova area have revealed traces of a Stone Age settlement. The Karlova-type stone ax is named after the district.

Before the urbanization, Karlova Manor was located in the area, the best-known owner of which in the 19th century was Thaddeus Bulgarin, a Russian writer of Polish origin, during which time the manor became the center of local Russian cultural life. Until the unification of Karlova with the city of Tartu in 1916, the building requirements of the city did not apply there, therefore numerous cheap wooden apartment buildings were built there and the location was given the derogatory nickname Pilpaküla. Karlov became the largest suburb of Tartu after unification. In the 1920s, the nickname Frommlinn was added after the architect of many buildings. Due to the wooden architecture from the beginning of the 20th century, a large part of Karlovy has been recognized as a building area of historical and cultural significance.

The area is relatively complete and still retains much of the historic buildings, as the area avoided the intensive conflict central Tartu experienced during the Tartu offensive.

== Location ==
The district is bordered by several large streets, as well as the Harbor Railway, and occupies a central area in Tartu, towards the south of the city center. The neighborhood is divided three distinct areas, Front Karlova, Rear Karlova, and All Karlova. Front-Karlova being located in the North-West, and All and Rear Karlova bordering each other in the southern area of the neighborhood. Each area has a distinctive architectural style. Front Karlova was the first area to be called such, with the other areas being merged later when the neighborhood joined the city of Tartu in 1916.

== Demographics ==
According to a census conducted in 2013 there were 8,856 people living in the neighborhood, with a roughly equal gender distribution of 4,853 women and 4,003 men. The population density of the district was 3850 in 2.3 km^{2}. 9.05% of Tartu residents lived in Karlova.

== Architecture ==
Most of the modern buildings of the district were completed in the early 1910s, some also in the 1920s. Karlova's buildings are characterized by a lively shape with numerous roof structures and slices and a unique Art Nouveau façade adapted to wooden architecture. The style is dominated by a distinctive inset window and door style. Karlova has very characteristic backyards with two-story sheds, unusual for the city.

On Päeva Street there is a group of wooden buildings built as cottages near the city in the second half of the 19th century. The villas on Pargi Street, and the top of Kalevi Street and a number of wooden houses with classicist design at the beginning of are considered to have significant cultural value. The villa at Kalevi 13, built in 1913 according to the design of architect V. Kessler, was an example of the later buildings of the same type in Tartu. The Church of St. Alexander of the Estonian Apostolic Orthodox Church in Tartu, which was built in 1914–1918, is located on Sõbra Street. Also noteworthy is the functionalist-style schoolhouse completed in 1939, now the building of the University of Tartu Teachers' Seminary.

== Educational institutions ==
Karlova has several schools, colleges and other educational institutions, with the Institute of Educational Sciences of the University of Tartu being located there. The neighborhood is most well known, however, for the arts and culture schools, including: Forselius School, Karlova School, Tartu Art College, Tartu Art School, Tartu I Music School, Helivõlu (a private music school) and Tartu Private School. The area is also home to two kindergartens.

== Community ==
Karlova is home to an active community, as well as the community group the Karlova Society. This organization has been responsible for organizing the annual community days since 2010.

== Notable residents ==
The neighborhood has been home to many artists and cultural figures notable in Estonia, including:

- Anna Haava; poet
- Hannes Kaljujärv, actor
- Elmar Kits, artist
- August Kitzberg, author
- Albert Kivikas, author and journalist
- Varmo Pirk, artist
- Lembit Saarts, artist
- Enriko Talvistu, art historian
- Heldur Viires, artist

== Gallery ==
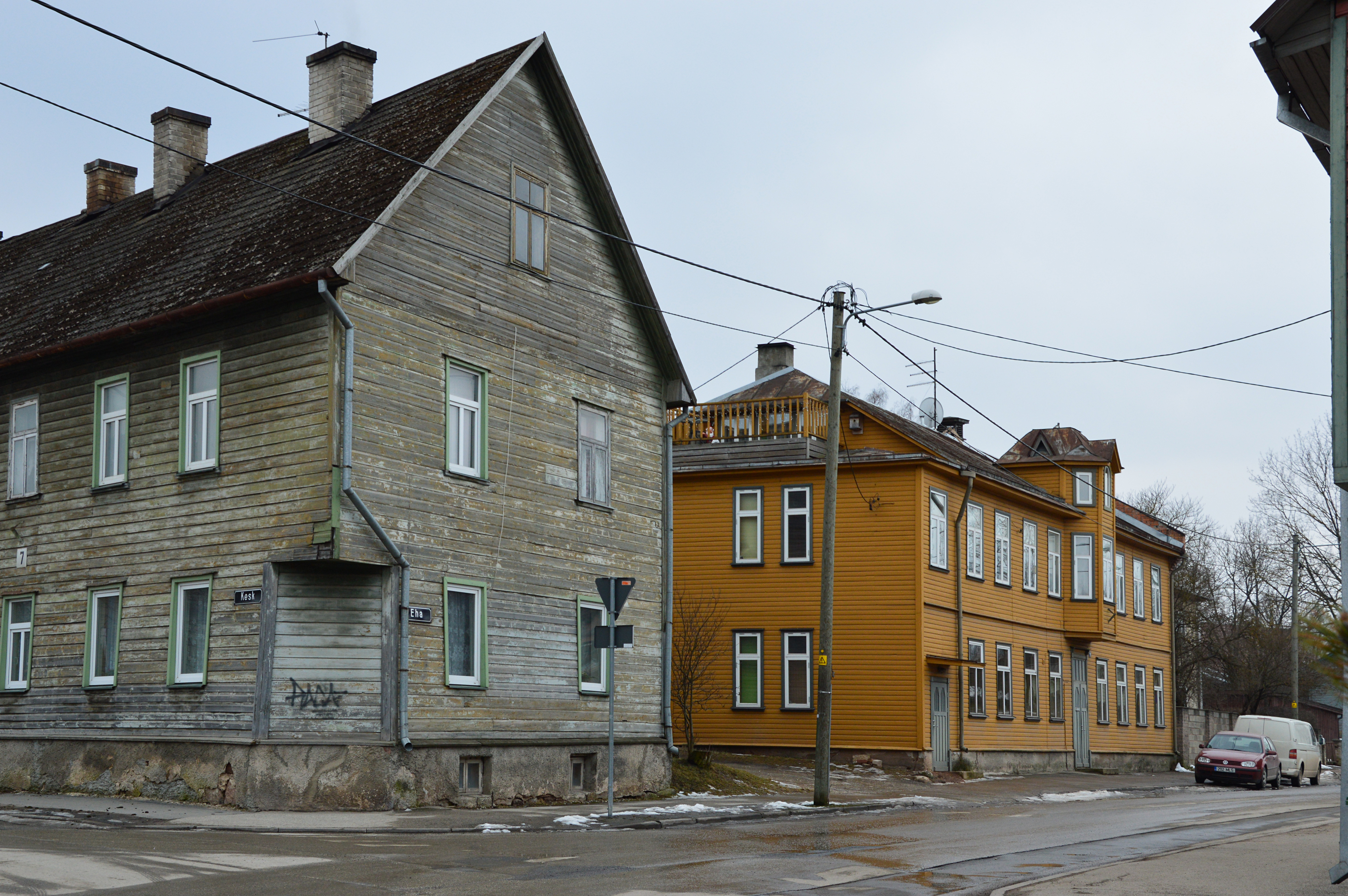

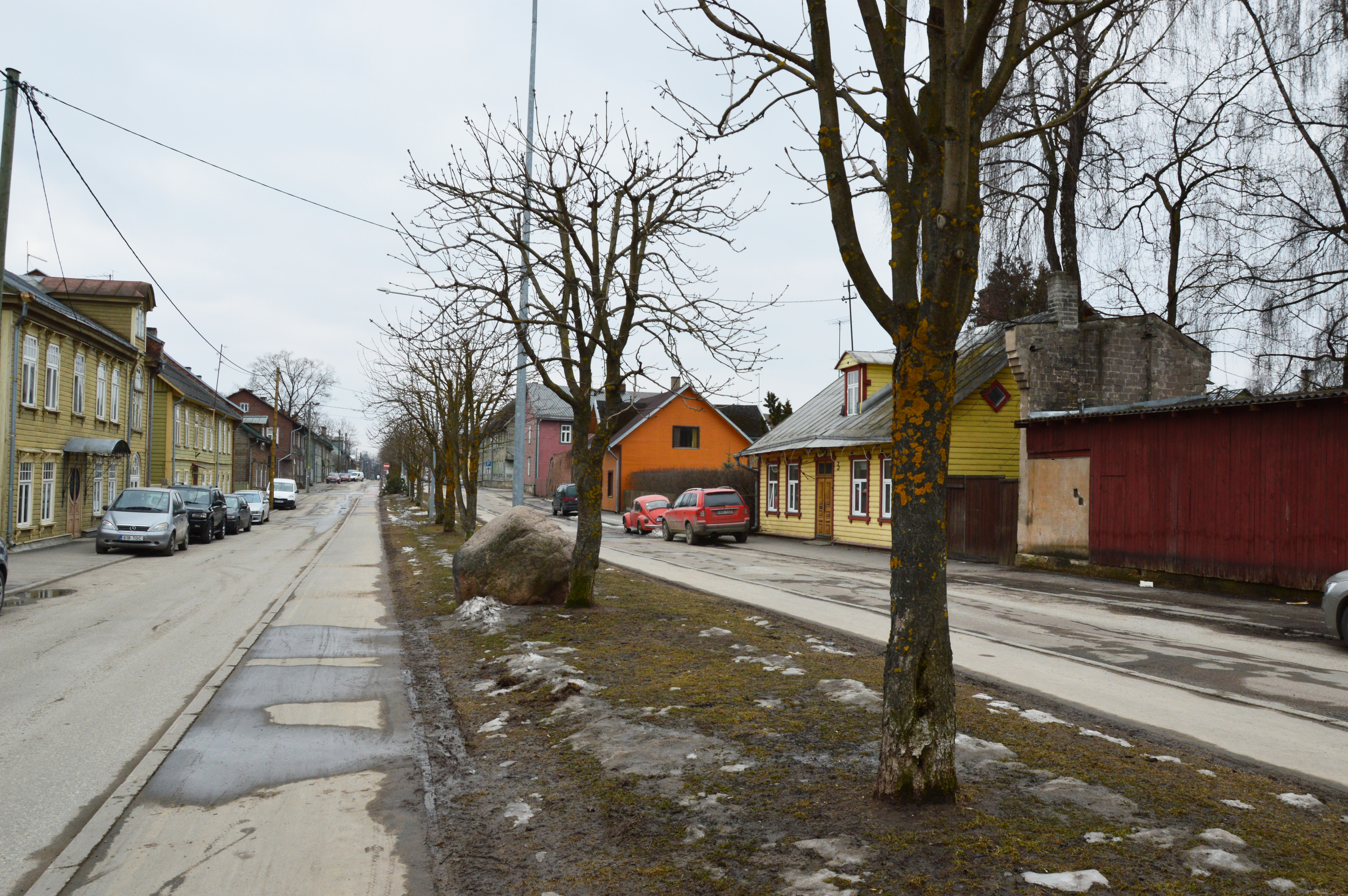

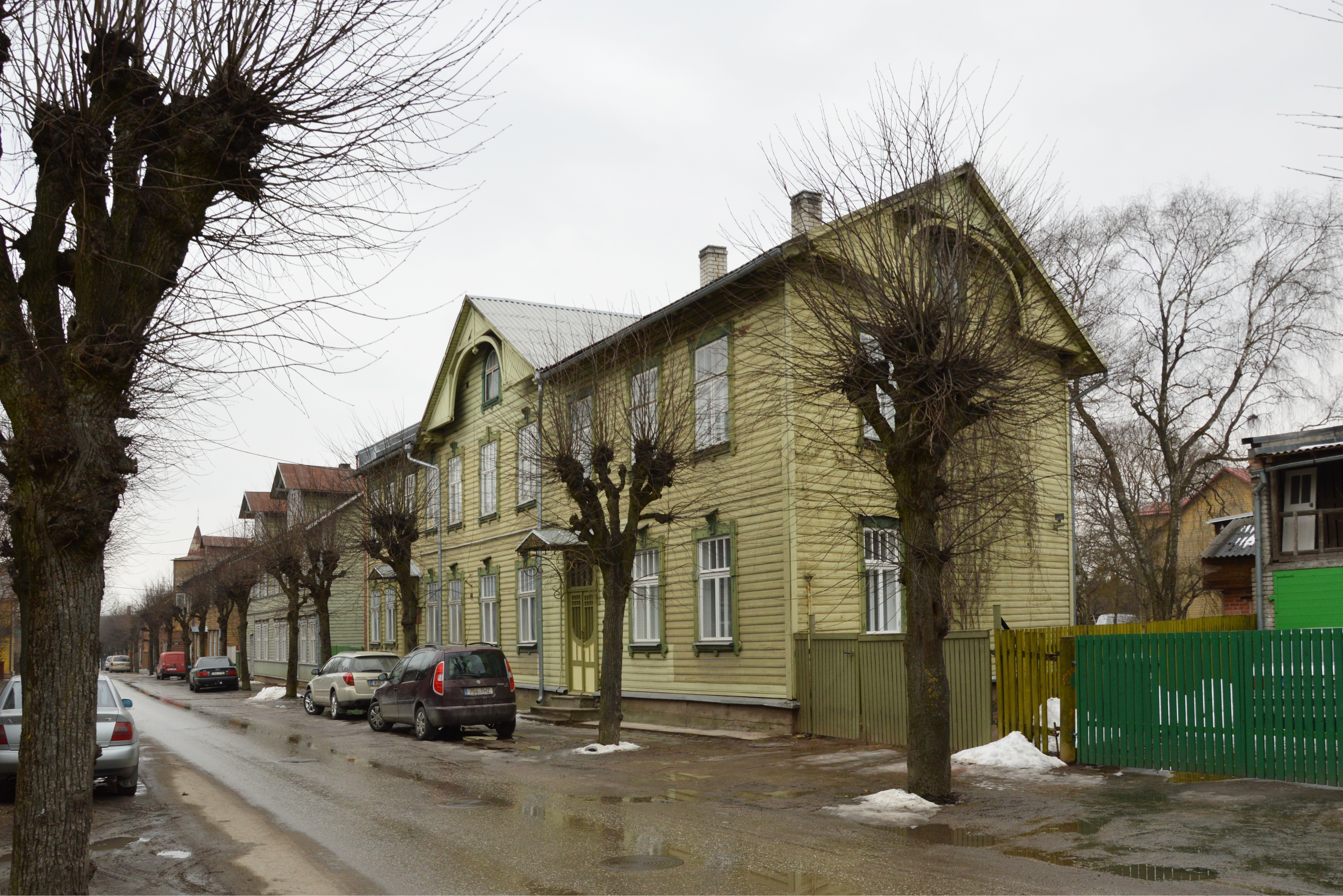

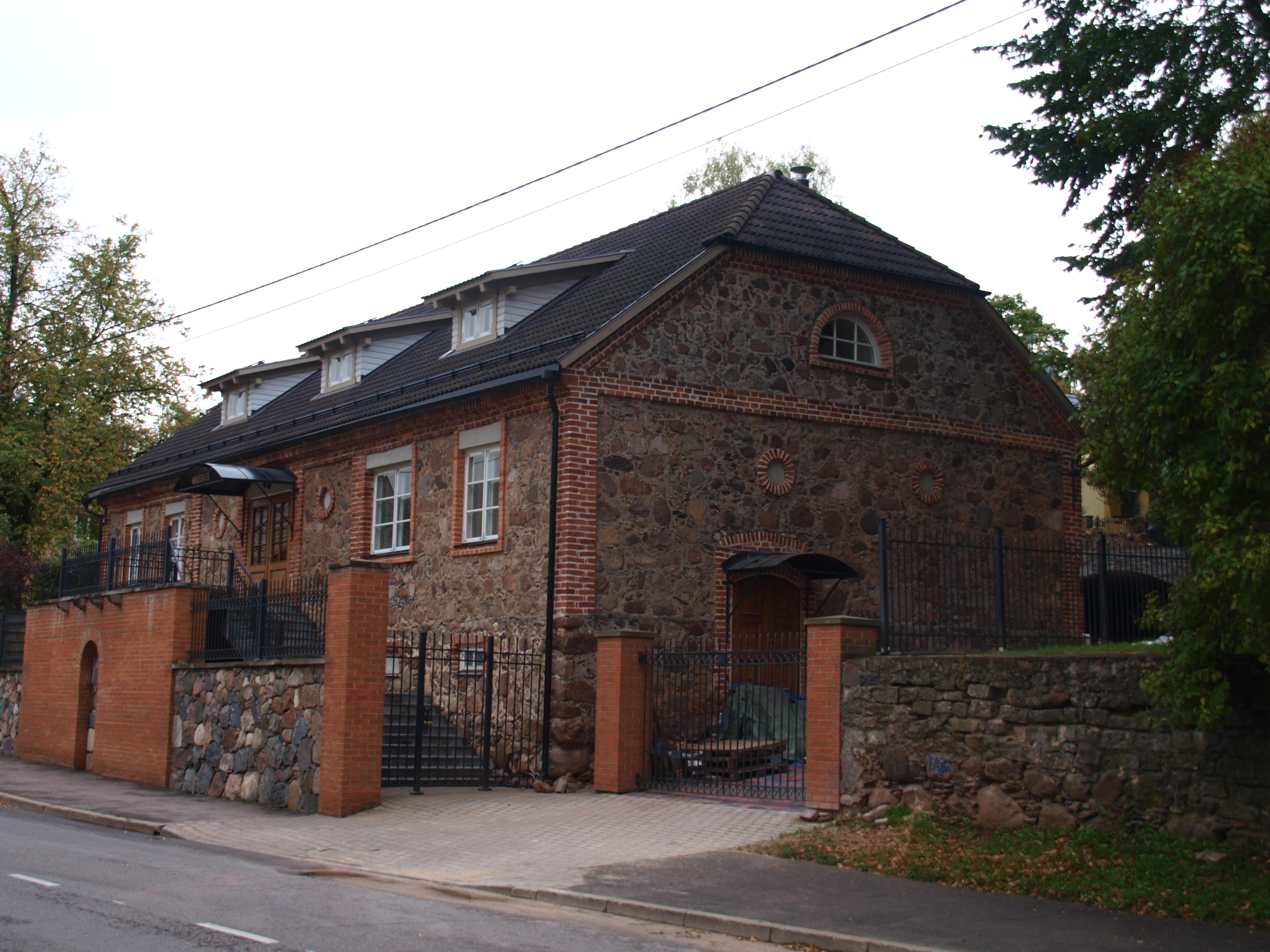

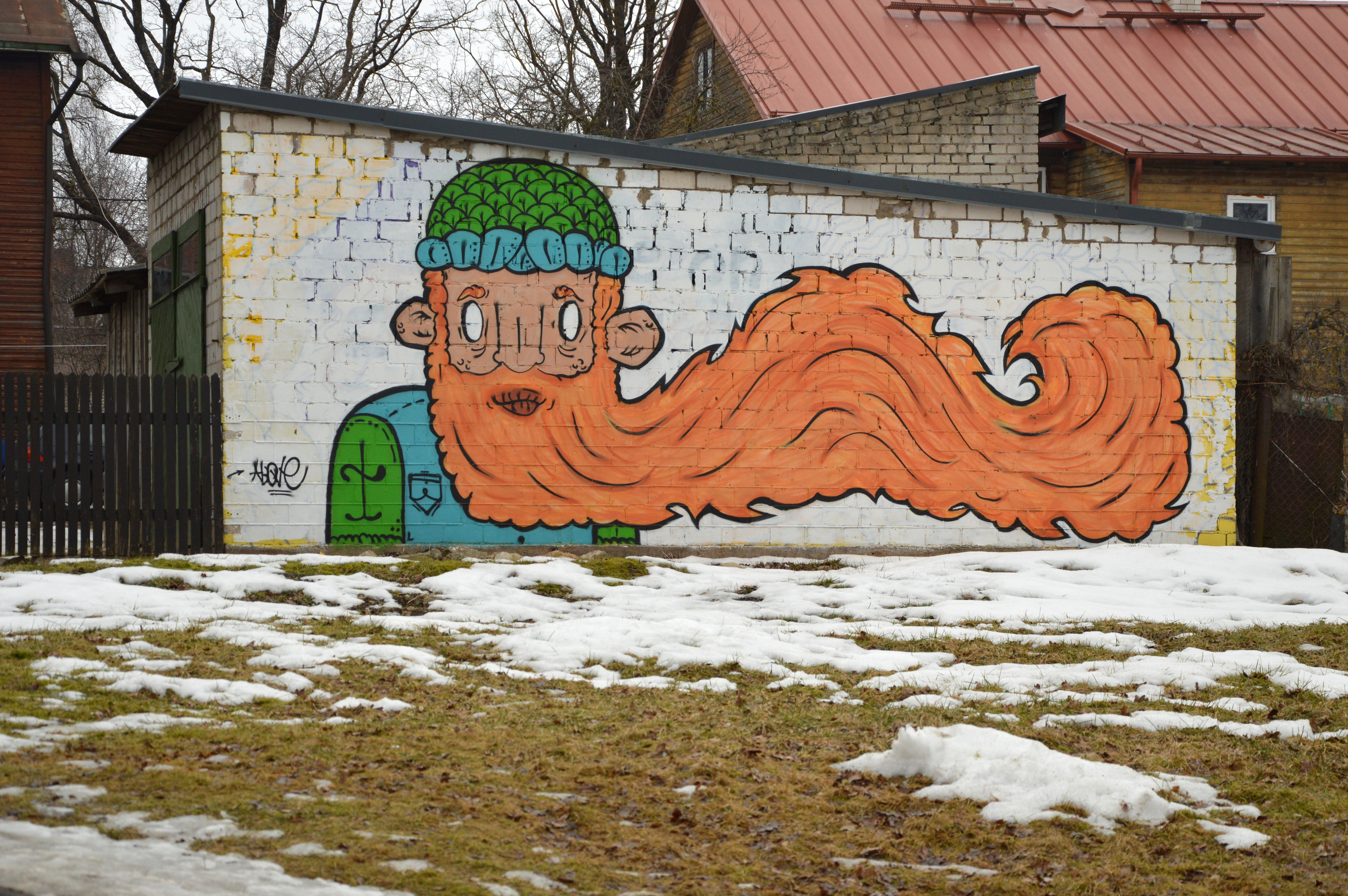

== See also ==
- Friendship Bridge, Tartu
- Karlova Manor
- Tartu Art College
- Tartu Art School
- Tartu Forselius School
- Tartu Karlova School
