= Vint (surname) =

Family name

Vint is a surname. Notable people with the surname include:

- Aili Vint (born 1941), Estonian graphic designer and painter
- Alan Vint (1944–2006), American character actor
- Colin Vint (born 1984), American soccer player
- James Vint (1881–1965), American Socialist
- Mare Vint (1942–2020), Estonian graphic artist
- Thomas Chalmers Vint (1894–1967), American landscape architect
- Tõnis Vint (1942–2019), Estonian artist
- Toomas Vint (born 1944), Estonian painter and writer
- William Vint (1768–1834), English congregationalist minister and dissenting academy tutor
