= Young Gardeners =

1968 painting by Malle Leis

- Noored aednikud (Estonian)
- (image viewable via museum record)
- Artist: Malle Leis
- Year: 1968
- Medium: Oil on canvas
- Dimensions: 100.0 cm × 100.3 cm (39.4 in × 39.5 in)
- Location: Tartu Art Museum, Tartu

Young Gardeners is an oil painting by Malle Leis in the Tartu Art Museum.

The painting shows a double self-portrait against a background of flowers and could be interpreted to mean two young gardeners lying down in a field of flowers of their own cultivation, as the title suggests. Its geometric forms with pop elements was probably originally intended to be a pendant of a similar work featuring a double portrait of her husband, painted in the same year.
