= Lõhmus =

Family name

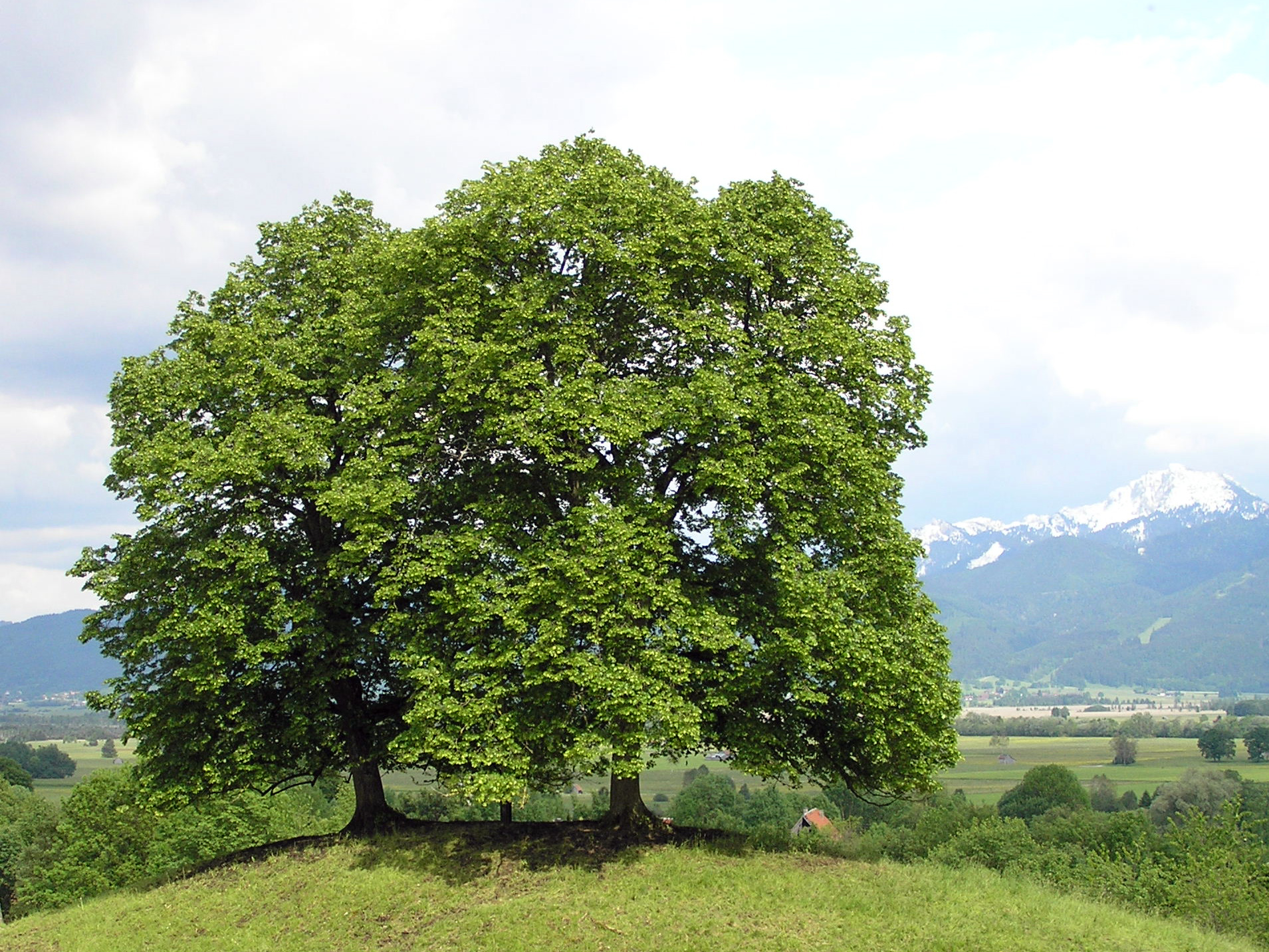

Origin
- Language: Estonian
- Meaning: Linden
- Region of origin: Estonia

Other names
- Variant form: Pärn

Lõhmus is a common surname in Estonia (meaning linden), and may refer to:

- Aivo Lõhmus (1950–2005), writer
- Ants-Enno Lõhmus (born 1936), Estonian politician
- Kaire Lõhmus (better known as Kaire Vilgats; born 1976), singer and actress
- Lembit Lõhmus (born 1947), graphic artist
- Sven Lõhmus (born 1972), composer, producer and lyricist
- Uno Lõhmus (1952–2024), jurist

== See also ==
- Pärn, more famous Estonian surname meaning Linden
