= Pallas University of Applied Sciences =

Vocational university in Tartu, Estonia

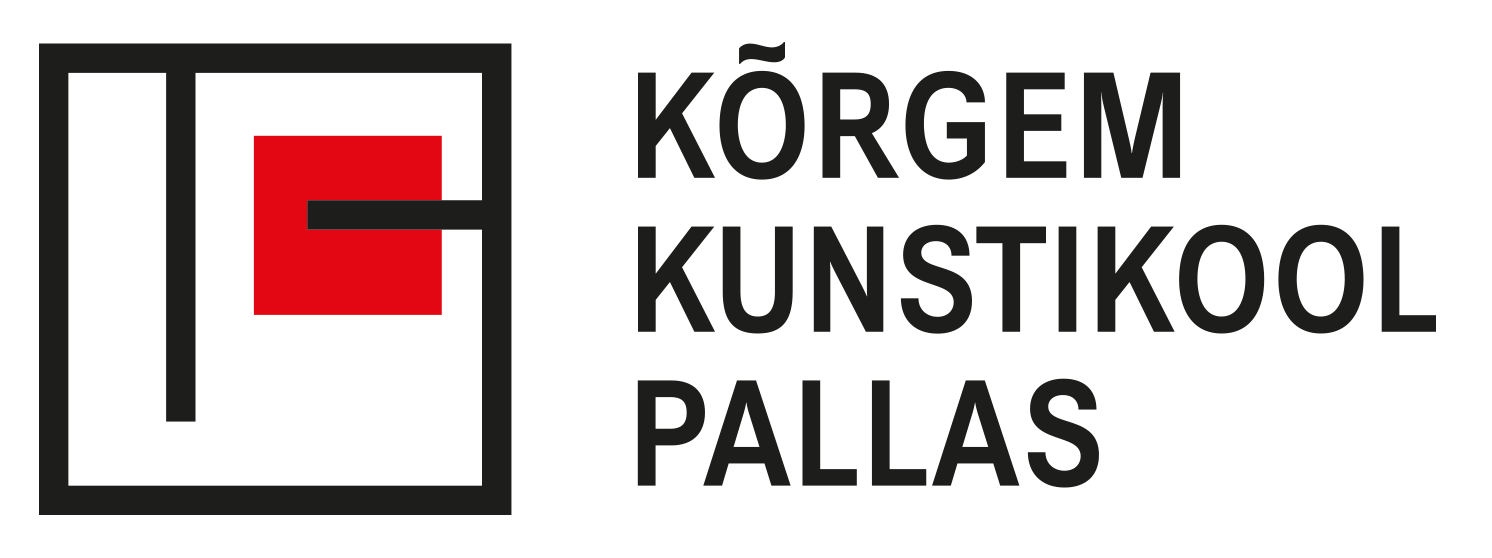
- Established: 1 August 2000; 26 years ago
- Director: Vallo Nuust
- Location: Tähe 38b, 50103 Tartu, Estonia, Tartu, Estonia; 58°22′09″N 26°43′48″E

Pallas University of Applied Sciences (Estonian: Kõrgem Kunstikool Pallas) is a university of applied sciences that provides art education in Tartu, Estonia. It provides studies in three focus areas (design, conservation/restoration and the arts), which are organised into eight curricula. Pallas was founded on 1 August 2000. The university is situated in Karlova. The rector is Piret Viirpalu.

== History ==
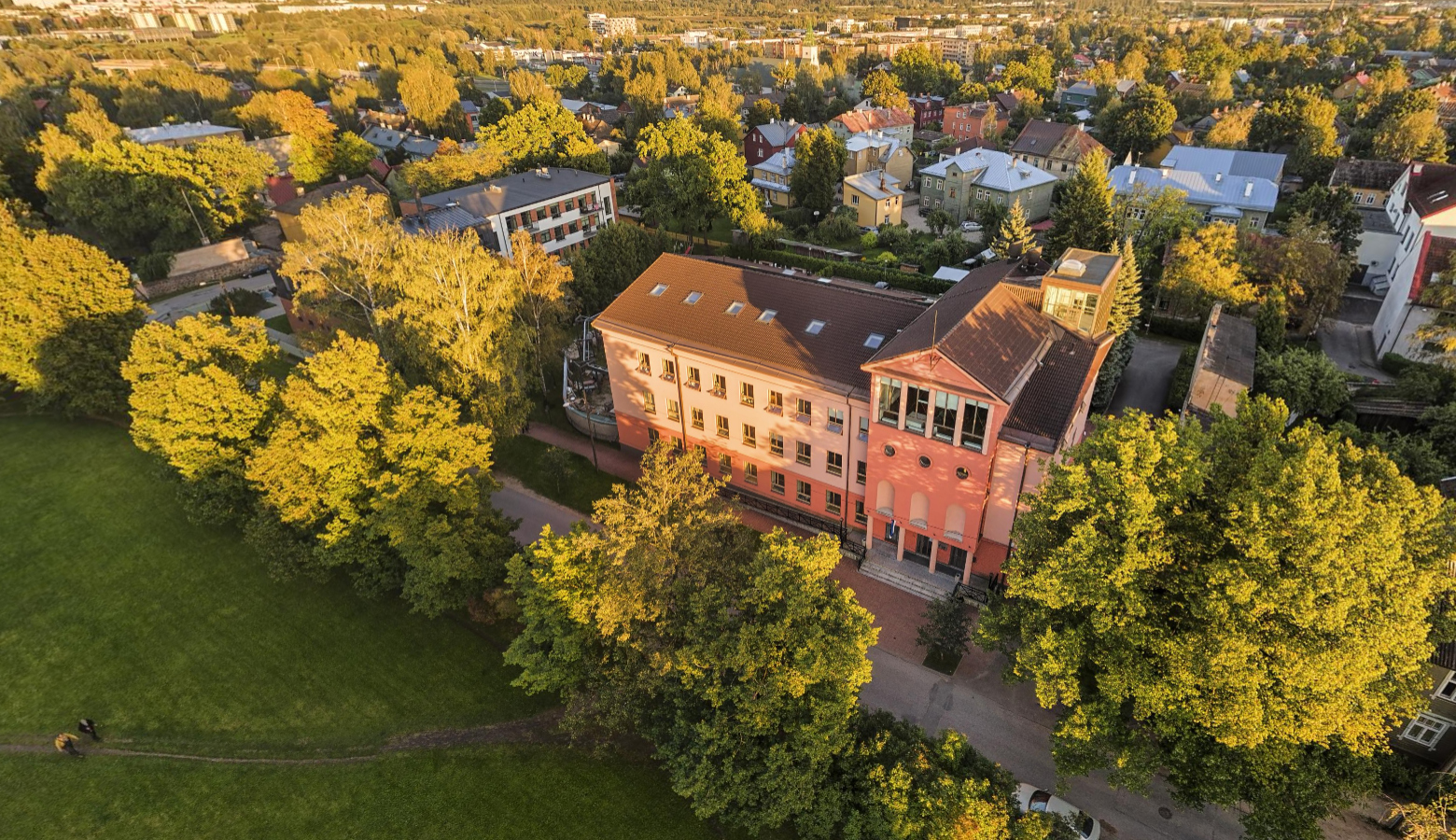
Pallas University of Applied Sciences

On grounds of precedence, Pallas is related to an educational institution of arts founded in Tartu in 1919. During the period from 1919 to 1960 Tartu Art College has existed as secondary and higher education institution under many names.

- 1919–1924 Art School of the Pallas Arts Association
- 1933–1940 Higher Art School Pallas
- 1940–1941 Public Higher Art School named after Konrad Mägi
- 1942–1943 Tartu Higher Courses of Fine Arts
- 1943–1944 Higher Art School Pallas
- 1944 Public Higher Art School named after Konrad Mägi
- 1944–1951 Estonian SSR Tartu State Art Institute
- 1951–1955 Tartu affiliate of the Estonian SSR Art Institute
- 1951–1960 Tartu School for Fine Arts
- 1960–2000 Tartu Art School
- 2000–2018 Tartu Art College (TAC)
- 2018– Pallas University of Applied Sciences (Pallas UAS)

== Administration ==
- Rectors: Krista Roosi (Acting Rector 2000-2001), Ants Juske (2001–2004), Vallo Nuust (2005-2022), Piret Viirpalu (2022-present).
- Vice Rector for Academic Affairs: Lennart-Jaak Mänd (2022-present).

== Departments ==
=== Department of Photography ===
In 1997 the Tartu Art School established a programme in Photography, which continued at the higher education level from 2000 at Tartu Art College. The architect of the initial curriculum and the director of the program was Vallo Kalamees. In 2000-2025, the Department of Photography was chaired by Peeter Linnap (born 1960).

=== Department of Conservation and Restoration ===
The Department admitted its first students in the 2024/2025 academic year. Its Conservation and Restoration curriculum brings together the previously separate competencies in the conservation and restoration of paintings, furniture, and paper, which were formerly taught in different departments. The head of the department is Kurmo Konsa.

=== Department of Painting ===
In 1997, Tartu Art School established a programme in Painting and Wall Paintings’ Restoration, which continued at the higher education level from 2000. The department was known as the Department of Paintings until 2019, when it was renamed the Department of Painting. From the 2024/2025 academic year, the curriculum of the department is called Painting (previously: Painting and Restoration). From 2000 to 2018, the Department of Painting was headed by Heli Tuksam (born 1956), from 2018 to 2021 by Kaspar Tamsalu (born 1988), and since 2021 by Margus Meinart.

=== Department of Media Design ===
In 1997 the Tartu Art School established the Department of Computer Graphics, headed by Are Tralla, with studies continuing at the higher education level from 2000. The curriculum of the department is divided into four major fields: print media, media design, interactive design and 3D design in a digital environment. From 2001 to 2007, the department was led by Raivo Kelomees. Since 2008, the department is led by Jaanus Eensalu (born 1964).

=== Department of Furniture ===
The history of the department goes back to 1955. At the higher education level, the curriculum of the Department of Furniture was called Furniture Design and Restoration. Since the 2024/2025 academic year, the curriculum has been called Interior Product Design. The department was headed by Jaak Roosi from 2000 to 2020, by Aivar Habakukk from 2020 to 2025, and by Kristina Allik since May 2025.

=== Department of Leather Design ===
The Leather Art programme was established in 1965 in the Tartu Art School. At the higher education level, the Department of Leather Design offered the curriculum Leather Design and Restoration. Since the 2024/2025 academic year, the curriculum has been called Leather Product Design and Technology. The department was headed by Professor Rutt Maantoa from 2000 to 2013, by Maila Käos from 2013 to 2019, by Professor Rene Haljasmäe from 2019 to 2024, and by Anni Vallsalu since 2025.

=== Department of Sculpture ===
Instruction in the Department of Sculpture is based on classical art education. The first head of the department was Mati Karmin. From 2011 to 2014 the department was chaired by Jaan Luik (born 1953). Since 2014 the department is led by Anne Rudanovski (born 1964).

=== Department of Textile ===
The curriculum of textile was formed in 1993, the founder and major developer of the department is the current head of the department, Professor Aet Ollisaar. The Department of Textile is a member of the international professional organization European Textile Networks and cooperates with the Estonian Association of Textile Artists as well as with the higher education institutions teaching specialty of textiles and fashion in Estonia or worldwide, and with the entrepreneurs in the field. Since 2000, the Department of Textile is chaired by Aet Ollisaar (born 1966).

== Gallery Pallas ==
Pallas University of Applied Sciences opened its art gallery in 2009 at Riia 11 in Tartu. Gallery Pallas is one of the largest exhibition spaces in Tartu and presents the work of Pallas students, faculty, and collaborators. The annual exhibition programme is based on an open call for proposals. In addition to exhibitions, the programme includes curatorial and gallery tours, workshops, lectures, and discussions. The gallery has three exhibition spaces: the ground-floor hall, basement rooms, and a second-floor project room. Exhibitions change at least once a month and visiting the gallery is free. Over the past five years, the gallery has received 136,299 visitors, averaging more than 27,000 visits per year.

== See also ==
- Estonian Academy of Art
- List of universities in Estonia
