= Ahti Seppet =

Estonian sculptor (born 1953)

- Born: September 27, 1953 (age 72); Tartu, then part of Estonian SSR, Soviet Union
- Occupation: Sculptor

Ahti Seppet (born September 27, 1953) is an Estonian sculptor.

Seppet was born in Tartu. He graduated from Tartu Art School in 1973. From 1979 to 1984, he worked as a teacher at Tartu Children's Art School. In 1984, he became the director of the Anton Starkopf Museum. He was a member of the group Para '89.

== Major exhibits ==
- Rooma Klubi (The Club of Rome)
- Mumifitseeritud suhe (The Mummified Relationship)
- Muuseum muuseumis I–III (Museum within a Museum I–III)
- Lenini lapsed (The Children of Lenin)
- Ehe kui väikevorm (A Jewel as a Small Form)
- Tõus ja mõõn (Ebb and Flow)

== Awards and recognitions ==
- 1992: Kristjan Raud Art Award
- 2000: Ado Vabbe Art Fellowship
- 2005: Anton Starkopf Fellowship
