= Pärn =

Family name

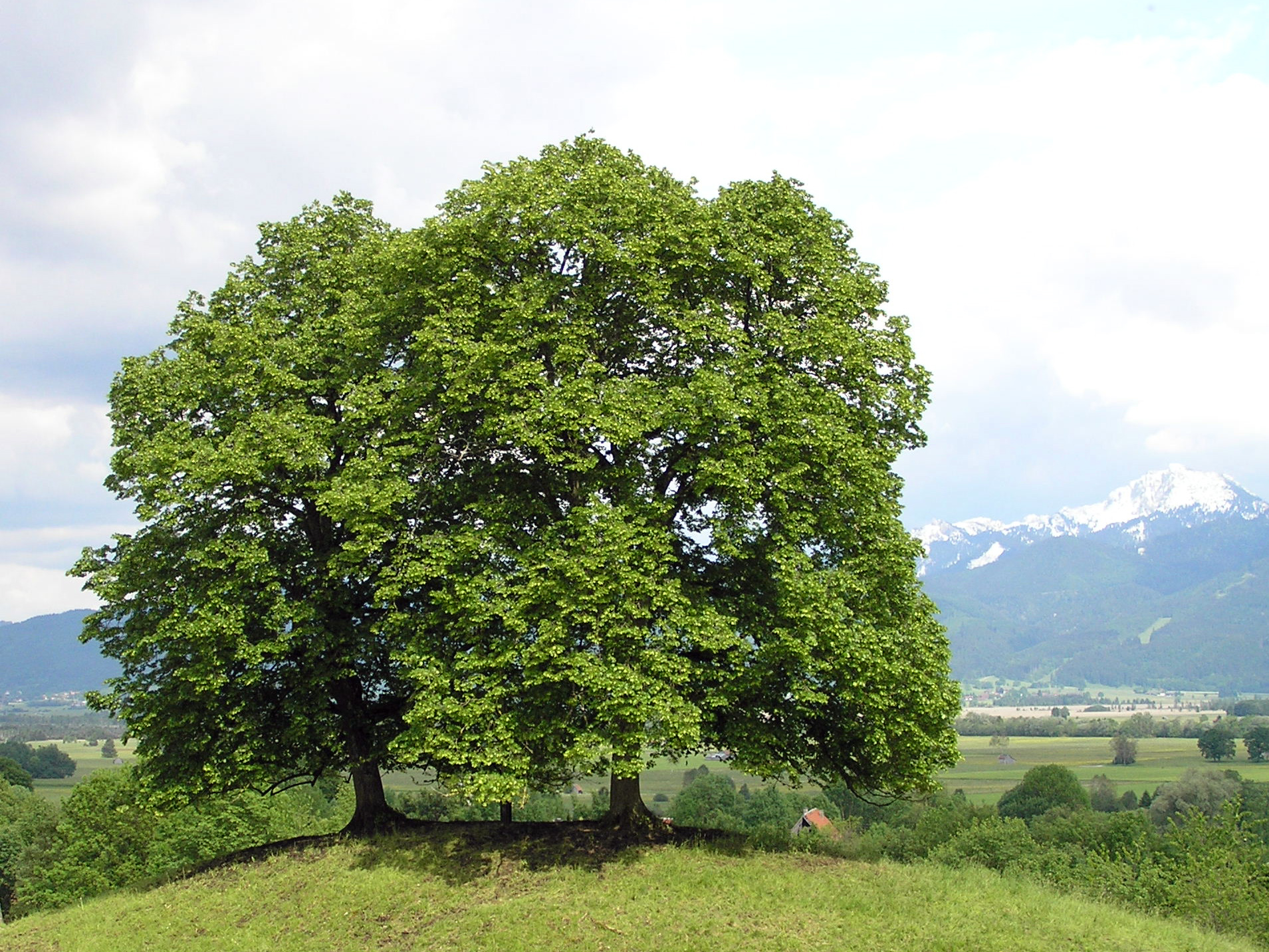

Origin
- Language: Estonian
- Meaning: Linden
- Region of origin: Estonia

Other names
- Variant form: Lõhmus

Pärn is a common surname in Estonia (meaning linden), and may refer to:

- Andre Pärn (born 1977), basketball player
- Endel Pärn (1914–1990), actor
- Harald Pärn (1912–1943), boxer (:et)
- Henn Pärn (born 1941), politician
- Illimar Pärn (born 1988), ski jumper
- Jakob Pärn (1843–1916), writer and pedagogue
- Katrin Pärn (born 1977), actress
- Lembit Pärn (1903–1974), Soviet military commander
- Malle Pärn (born 1945), actress
- Olga Pärn (born 1976), animator, film director and illustrator
- Priit Pärn (born 1946), cartoonist and animation director
- Sander Pärn (born 1992), rally driver
- Rasmus Pärn (born 2009), Viljandi Tulevik U-19 Captain

== See also ==
- Lõhmus, another Estonian surname meaning Linden
