= Anton Starkopf Fellowship =

Annual prize by the Cultural Endowment of Tartu

The Anton Starkopf Fellowship (Estonian: Anton Starkopfi stipendium) was a fellowship that was awarded by the Cultural Endowment of Tartu (Estonian: Tartu Kultuurkapital) and the city of Tartu from 2002 to 2014 to a sculptor or a sculpture project team whose work has significantly enriched the Estonian art world, giving priority to creative projects related to Tartu whenever possible. The fellowship was named after the Estonian sculptor Anton Starkopf (1889–1966).

== Recipients ==
- 2002: Stanislav Netšvolodov
- 2003: Mati Karmin
- 2004: Endel Taniloo
- 2005: Ahti Seppet
- 2006: Jaan Luik
- 2007: Heldur Viires
- 2008: Andrus Kasemaa
- 2009: Ekke Väli
- 2010: Tiiu Kirsipuu
- 2011: Jass Kaselaan
- 2012: Jevgeni Zolotko
- 2013: Jaak Soans
- 2014: Mare Mikoff
