= Jaan Luik =

Estonian sculptor (born 1953)

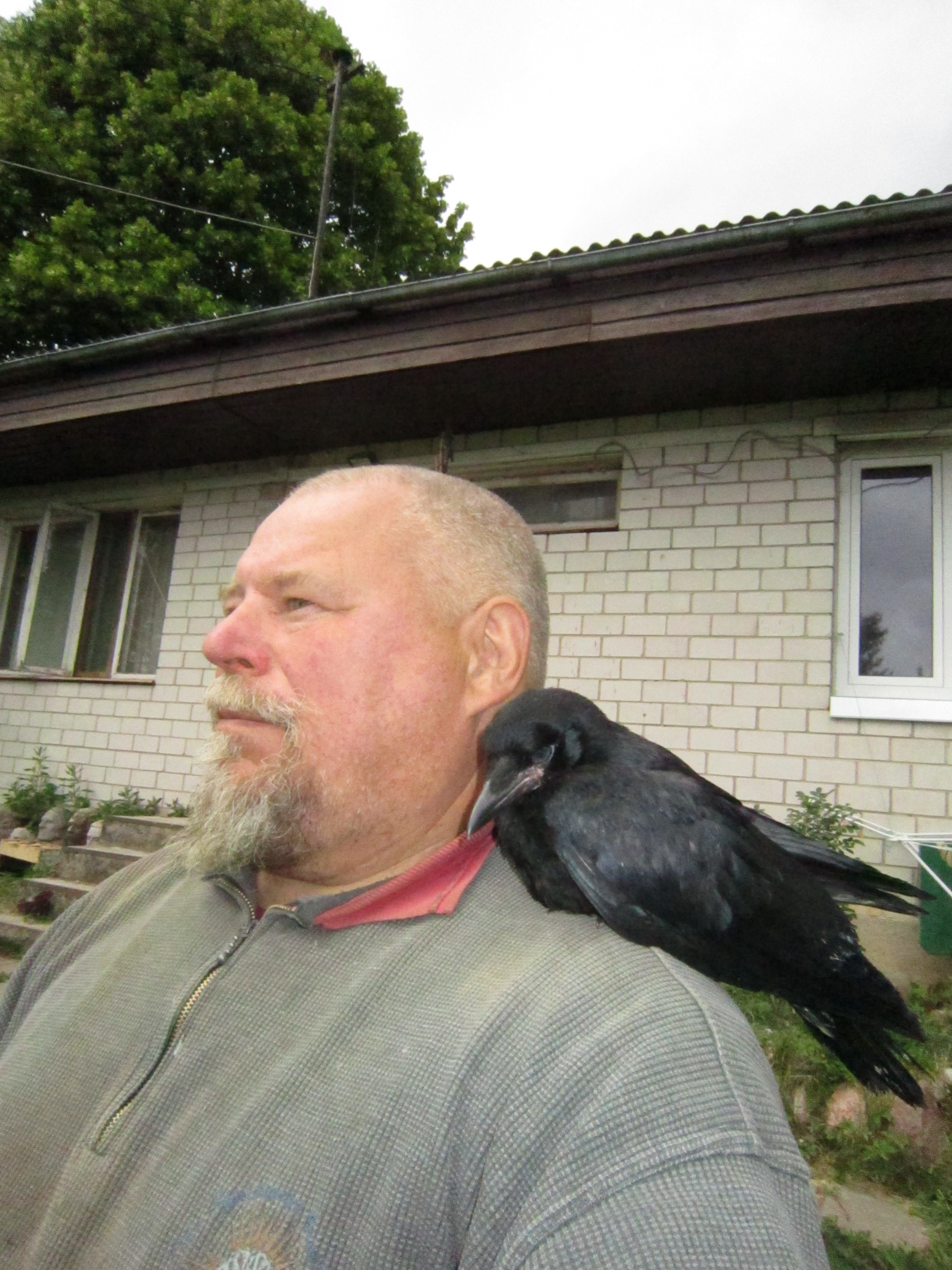
- Born: September 17, 1953 (age 73); Tallinn, then part of Estonian SSR, Soviet Union
- Occupation: Sculptor

Jaan Luik (born September 17, 1953) is an Estonian sculptor.

== Early life and education ==
Luik was born in Tallinn. From 1960 to 1972, he attended Tallinn School No. 24 (now Tallinn Art High School). From 1973 to 1979, he studied sculpture and teaching at the Tallinn State Applied Art Institute of the ESSR.

== Career ==
From 1979 to 2000, Luik taught sculpture, composition, and drawing at Tartu Art School. He was the chair of the Tartu Artists Union from 1995 to 1997. He has taught as a guest lecturer at Imatra Art School in Finland since 1995.

== Awards and recognitions ==
- 2006: Anton Starkopf Fellowship

== Works ==
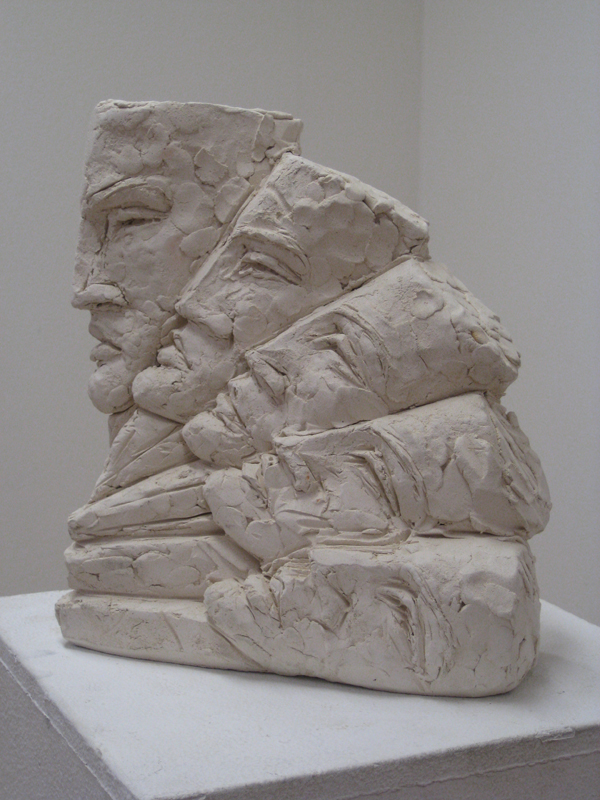
Lehvik II (Fan II)

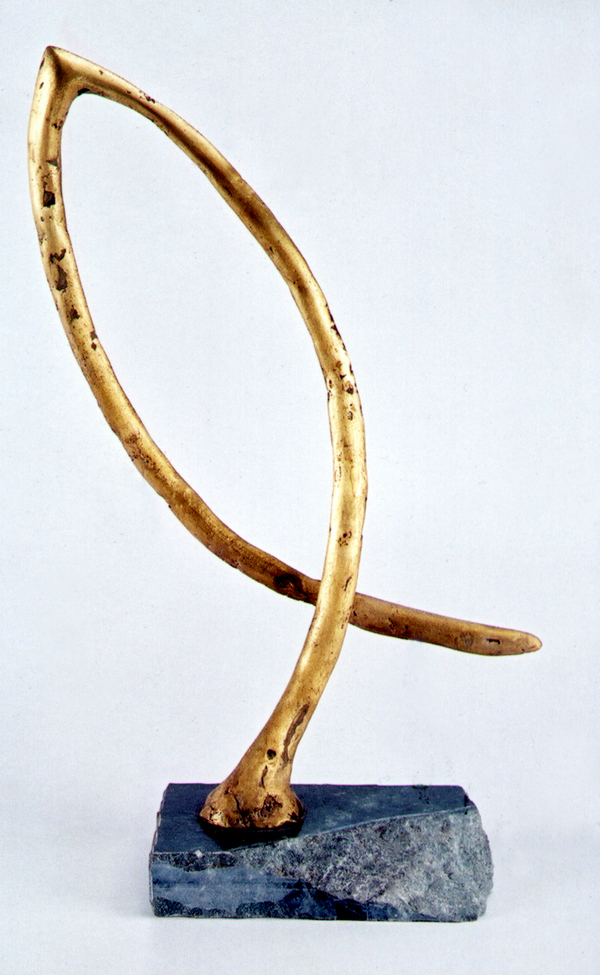
Ikthus III (Ichthys III)

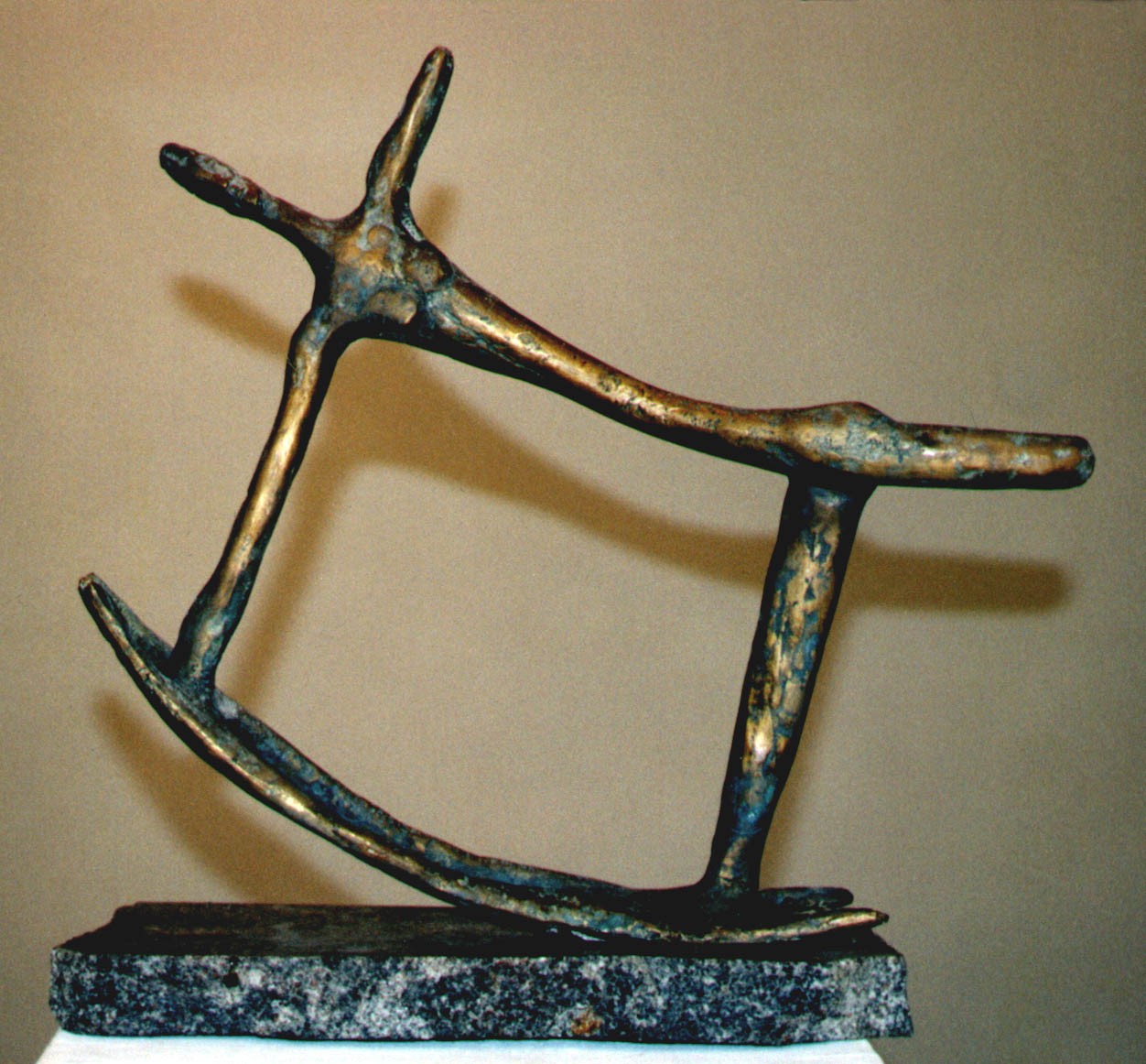
Kiikuja (Tasakaal) (Swing (Equilibrium))

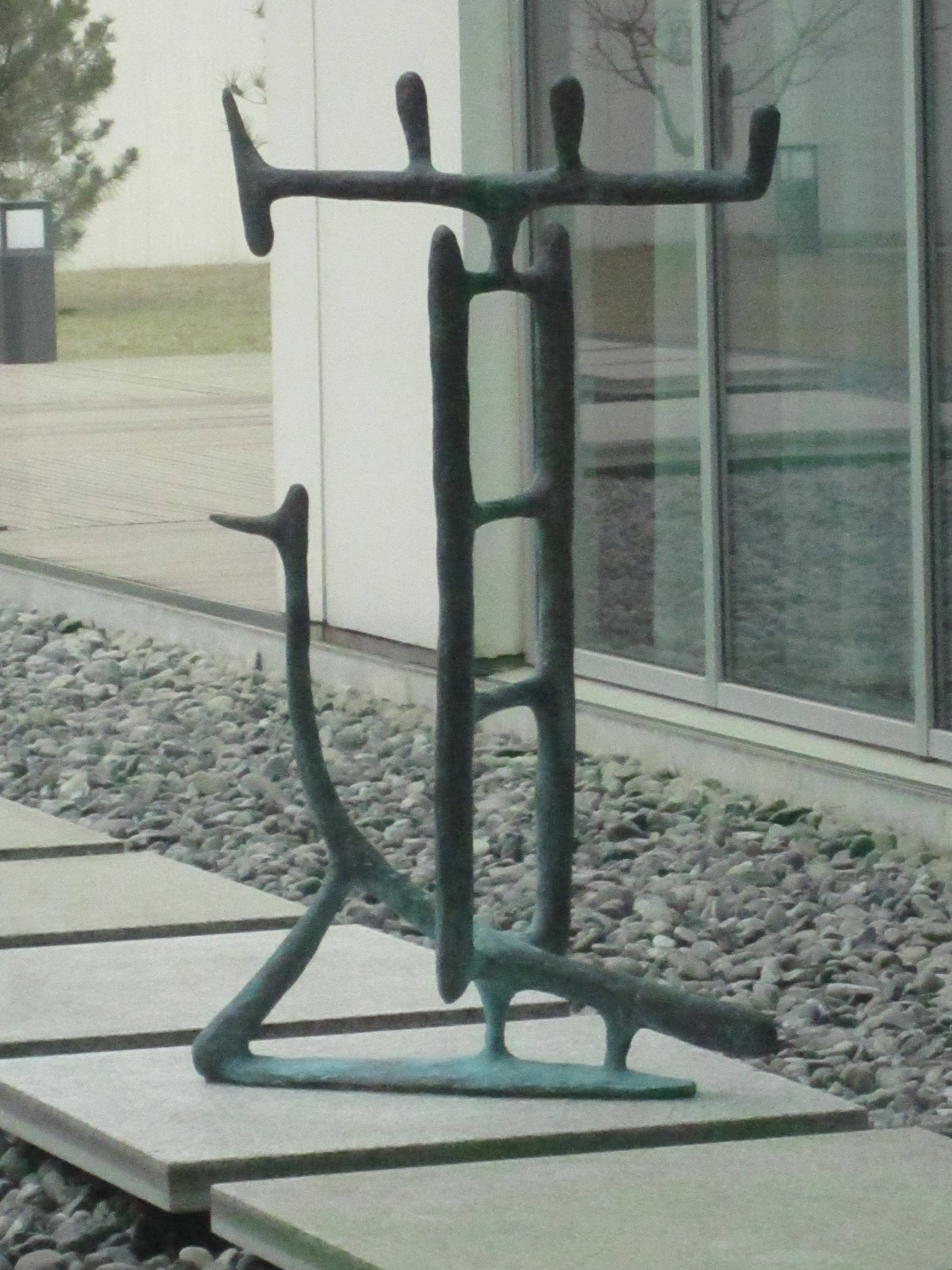
Kulg 16 (Course 16)

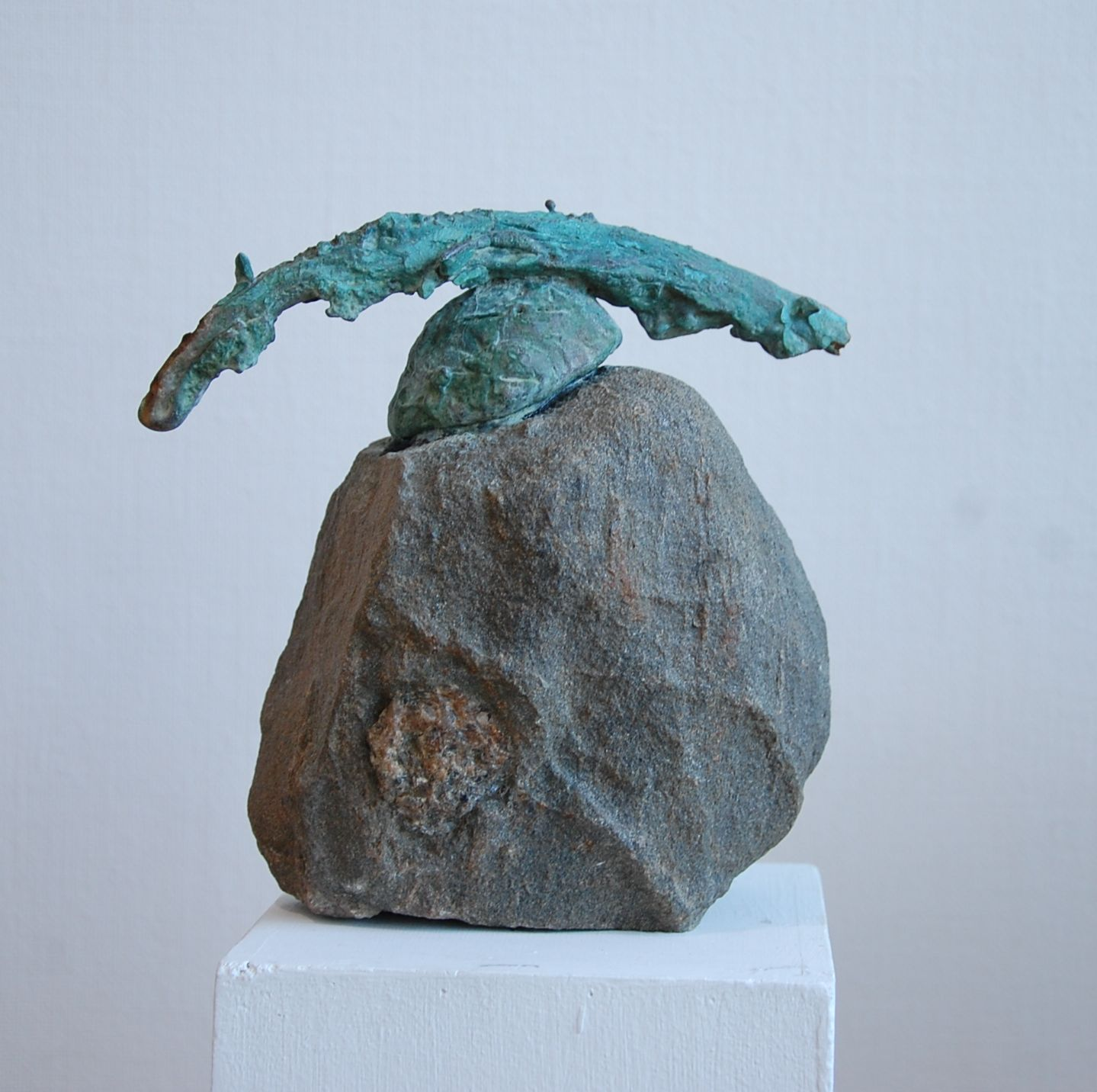
Muutumine 14 (Change 14)
