= Heldur Viires =

Estonian painter and book illustrator (1927–2021)

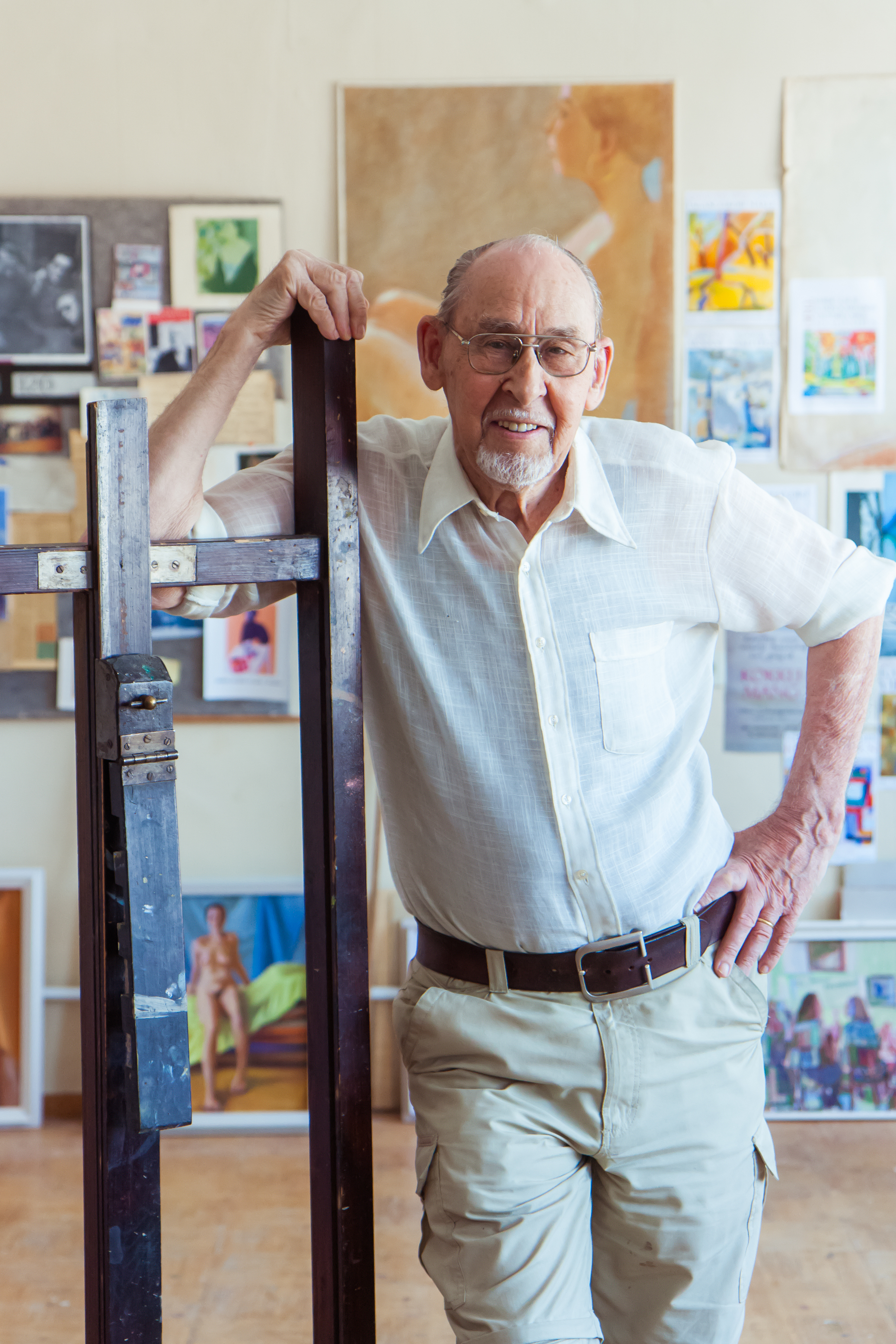
- Heldur Viires in 2014
- Born: June 23, 1927; Tallinn, Estonia
- Died: June 23, 2021 (aged 94)
- Occupations: Painter and book illustrator

Heldur-Jaan Viires (until 1935 Heldur-Jaan Veerbaum; June 23, 1927 – June 23, 2021) was an Estonian painter and book illustrator.

== Early life and education ==
Viires was born in Tallinn, the son of Jaan Viires (né Veerbaum, 1882–1951) and Eveline Viires (née Reino, 1889–1970). He graduated from Tallinn Secondary School No. 2 with a gold medal in 1945 and studied at the Tartu State Art Institute from 1945 to 1949. In 1949, he was studied at the I. E. Repin Institute of Painting, Sculpture, and Architecture in Leningrad as a scholarship holder. At the end of the same year, the artist returned to Tartu, where he was arrested in 1950 like his fellow students Esther Potisepa, Valdur Ohakas, Henn Roode, Lembit Saarts, and Ülo Sooster.

He was held at the Vorkuta Gulag until 1956. After returning, he entered the State Art Institute of the Estonian SSR, where he studied painting and graduated in 1959. His thesis project was the oil painting Kalurikolhoosis (Fishermen's Collective Farm).

== Career ==
After graduating, Viires started working as an artist, mainly dealing with book illustrations. He designed and illustrated both classic and science fiction works, poetry collections, and children's books. He created album covers for the company Melodiya. When the new publishing house Valgus was founded, he became involved in illustrating research works, which he continued until his retirement.

Viires belonged to the 1960 Art Group. He became a lecturer at the Tartu Art Association Studio (the Konrad Mägi Studio) in 1989, and its manager in 1998. In 2016, he turned over his teaching position to the alumni of the studio.

== Works ==
Viires started presenting at exhibitions in 1959. He had personal exhibitions in 1971 in Gothenburg, in 1978 in Stockholm, on New Year's Eve 1981/1982 at the Tartu Art Museum, in 1988 at the Adamson-Eric Museum in Tallinn, in 1994 at the Küü Gallery in Tartu (together with Kaja Kärner), and in 1996 at the Mikkeli Gallery in Tartu (with Kaja Kärner). In 1998, a selection of monotypes by Viires was exhibited at the Mikkeli Gallery. In 2007, Viires' monotypes were exhibited at the Tartu Art House.

Viires was a prolific nature draftsman, and he drew pictures of species for several maps and nature books:

- 1970: Eesti pomoloogia (Pomology of Estonia)
- 1971: Jaan Viidalepp. Liblikate määraja (Butterfly Identifier)
- 1980: Haide-Ene Rebassoo and Heldur Viires. Eesti taimharuldusi (Rare Estonian Plants)
- 1981: Haide-Ene Rebassoo and Heldur Viires. Kaitskem kauneid taimi! (Let's Protect Beautiful Plants!)
- 1982: Punane Raamat (The Red Book)
- 1984: Neeme Mikelsaar. Eesti NSV kalad (Fish of the Estonian SSR)
- 1984: Eerik Kumari. Eesti lindude välimääraja (Estonian Bird Field Identifier), 4th edition,

== Memberships ==
- 1964: Member of the Estonian Artists' Association
- 1989: Member of the Pallas art association

== Awards and recognitions ==
- 2000: Tartu County Expert Group Cultural Award from the Cultural Endowment of Estonia
- 2001: Order of the White Star, Fifth Class
- 2007: Anton Starkopf Fellowship
- 2009: Honorary member of Pallas art association
- 2019: Honorary Citizen of the City of Tartu and Knight of the Grand Star of Tartu
