= Mare Mikoff =

Estonian sculptor (born 1941)

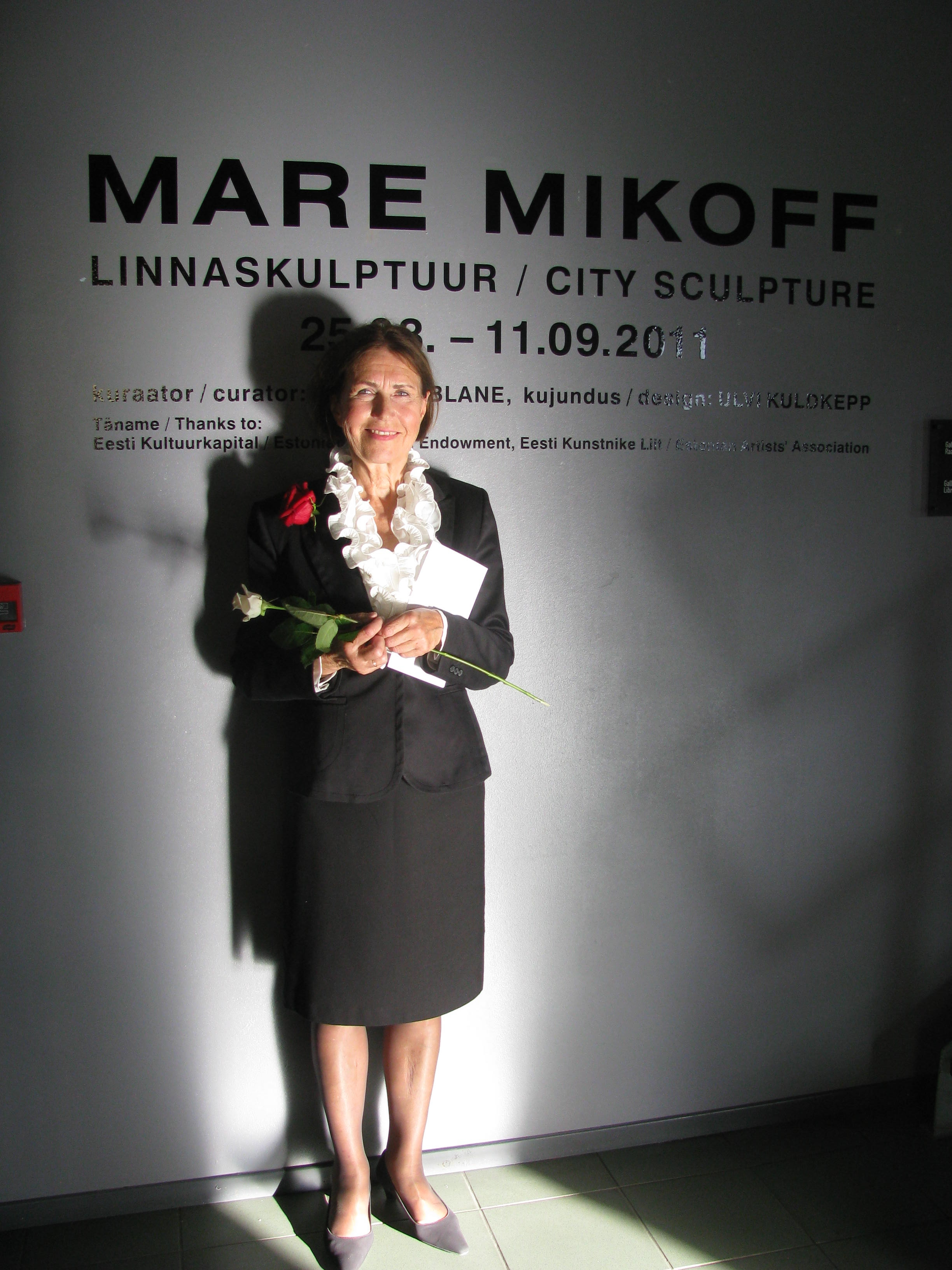
Mare Mikoff at the opening of her exhibition "Urban Sculptures" at the Museum of Architecture (2011)

Mare Mikoff (born 20 August 1941, in Tallinn) is an Estonian sculptor, best known for her sculptures of Jüri Vilms and Paul Keres in Pärnu, of Karl Menning at the Vanemuine in Tartu, and public sculptures in Nõmme and at the Viru Keskus. Influenced by hyperrealism and pop art, her work has been exhibited at the Museum of Estonian Architecture.

== Awards ==
- 1984: Kristjan Raud Art Award
- 2011: Order of the White Star
- 2014: Anton Starkopf Fellowship
