= Lembit Lõhmus =

Estonian printmaker

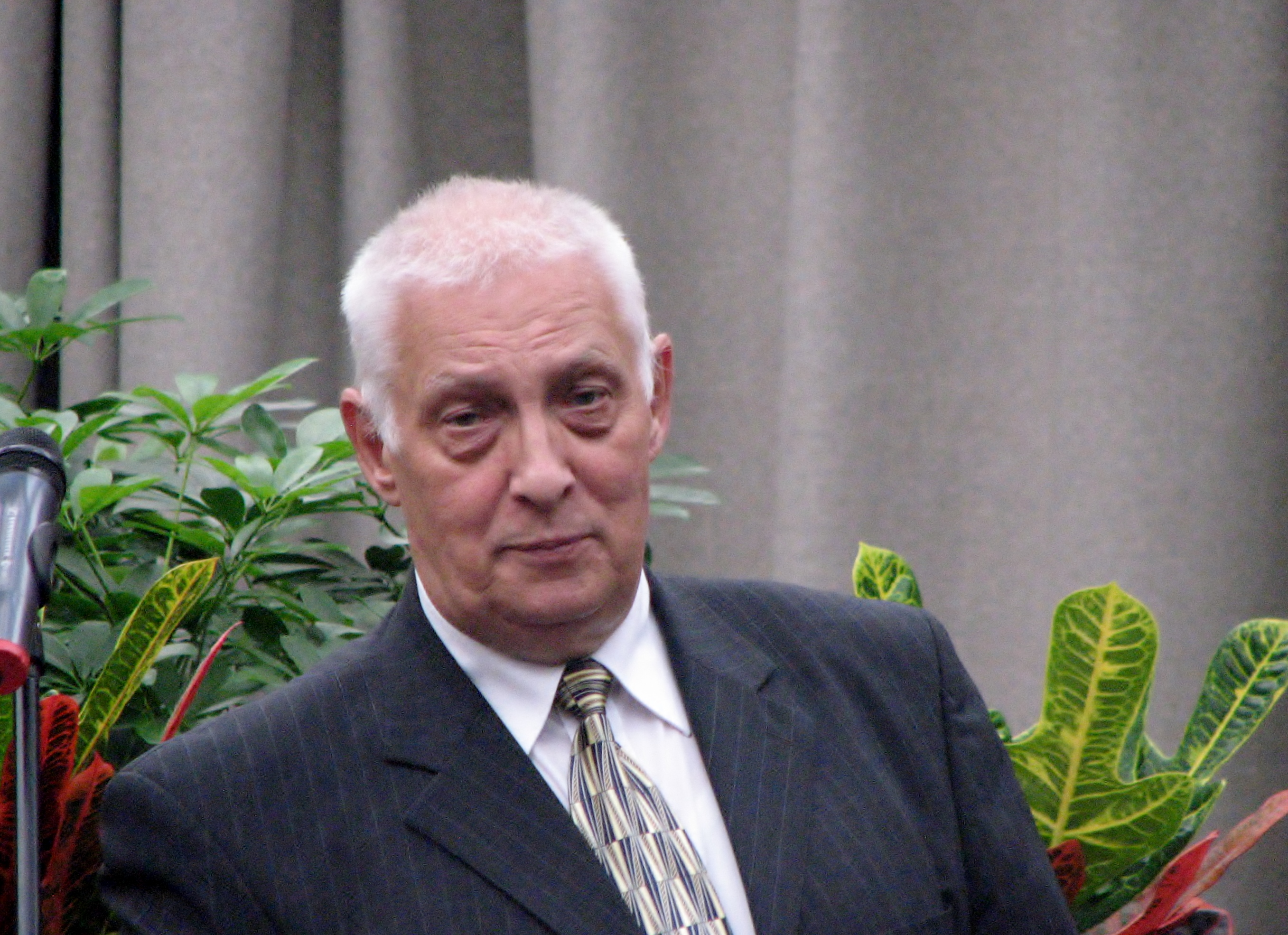
- Born: 25 September 1947 (age 78); Mustla, then part of Estonian SSR, Soviet Union
- Education: Tartu Art School
- Known for: Printmaking

Lembit Lõhmus (born 25 September 1947) is an Estonian printmaker.

He born in Mustla, Viljandi County. In 1969, he began studies at the Tartu Art School and graduated cum laude from the State Art Institute of the Estonian SSR in 1975. From 1975 to 1977 he worked at the Art Museum of Estonia as the head of the Department of Applied Arts. From 1977 until 1988, he worked as an interior designer. 1989-1992 he was the president of Tallinn Bookplate Club. From 1989 until 2003, he was a freelance printmaker. From 2003 until 2010, he worked at Eesti Postmark and designed over two hundred postage stamps for six countries. He has created over five hundred ex libris and small prints in wood, copper and steel engravings.

He is the designer of the reverse design of the Estonian euro coins.
