= Tartu Karlova School =

Elementary School in Tartu, Estonia

- Tartu Karlova Kool

Location
- Salme 1a Lina 2 Tartu, Tartu County, 50103; Estonia
- Coordinates: 58°22′17″N 26°44′2″E

Information
- School type: State-funded secondary school
- Religious affiliation: Secular
- Founded: 1875
- Founder: Pauline Jürgens
- Status: Open
- Director: Krista Andreson
- Head teacher: Karmen Põder and Merle Ööpik
- Staff: Deputy director in the field of music Annelii Traks
- Grades: 0–12
- Average class size: 24 pupils
- Language: Estonian
- Houses: 2
- Newspaper: Postipoiss
- Alumni: Aadu Must; Andres Dvinjaninov; Rauno Elp
- Website: Official website

Tartu Karlova School (Estonian: Tartu Karlova Kool; abbreviated as TKK) is a secondary school in Tartu, Estonia. The school was founded in 1875 by Pauline Jürgens.

== History ==
Tartu Karlova Kool is one of the oldest schools in Tartu. Its roots go back as far as 1875 when Pauline Jürgens II founded her own private school. The name and the address have changed during that time. Today's building at Lina 2 street was finished in 1925 and was known as the "Tartu City 7th Primary School".

In 1967 the new part of the school was built and with new specialised music and history classes. Since then the school has been a highschool. On 1 September 1995, the name of the school was changed to the "Tartu Karlova Gymnasium".

In 2014, it became Tartu Karlova Kool.
