= Vint (play) =

Vint is a short play by David Mamet, adapted from a short story by Anton Chekhov. The play was commissioned by The Acting Company and, along with six other commissioned plays, presented in 1986 as Orchards.

== Background and productions ==
The Acting Company commissioned playwrights to write stage versions of short stories by Anton Chekhov . Vint was written by Mamet as a result, adapted from the short story Vint and translated by Avrahm Yarmolinsky. The seven plays that were written for this commission were presented under the umbrella title Orchards at the Lucille Lortel Theatre, running from April 22, 1986, to May 4, 1986, and were directed by Robert Falls and Michael Kahn.

Vint was produced at the Lincoln Center Festival of Chekhov Shorts on March 23–24, 1996.

== Plot overview ==
Vint is a "virtual cameo" about "bureaucrats who lighten their day by playing a game of cards (vint) using the personal files in their care." An official hears his wife's name and "takes the sort of action one might least expect."

== Analysis ==
In reviewing the published play, Harvey Pitcher wrote that Mamet was the "most faithful to Chekhov..... Chekhov himself was the first to realize that many of his early stories, consisting largely of dialogue, could be easily transferred to the stage. Mamet made the same discovery. Resisting the temptation to improve on Chekhov, he has produced an attractively straightforward version of the comic story 'Vint,' in which a group of civil servants give an original twist to a popular card game."
