= Tartu Art House =

Building and art gallery in Tartu, Estonia

Coordinates: 58.37538°N 26.72065°E

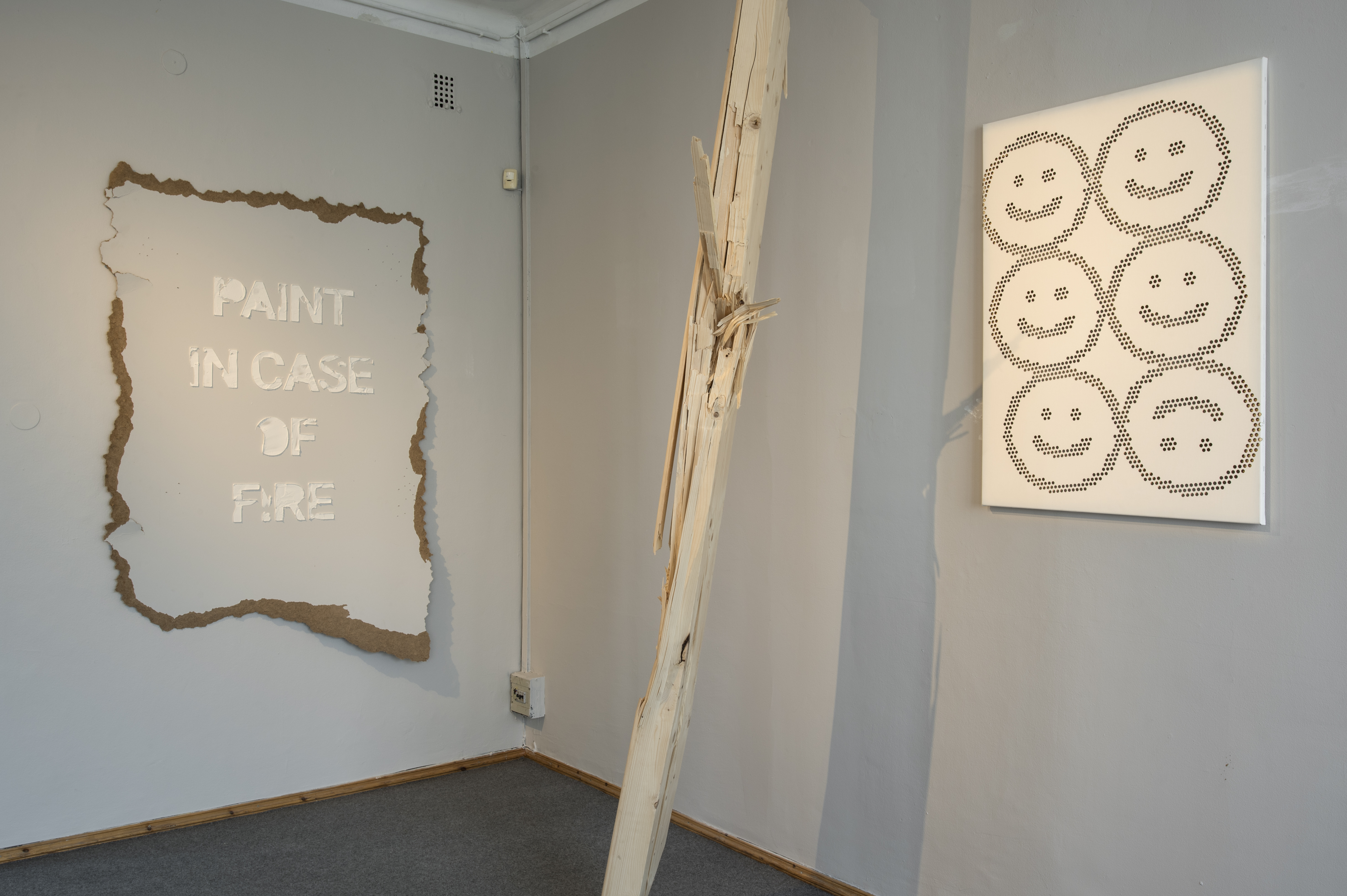
Mihkel Ilusa exhibition

Tartu Art House (Estonian: Tartu Kunstimaja) is a building and art gallery in Tartu, Estonia. The house is managed by Tartu Artists' Union. Every year about 30 exhibitions take place.

As of about 2020, the house has three galleries: Big Gallery (172 m^{2}), Small Gallery (57 m^{2}) and Monumental Gallery (57 m^{2}).

The building was erected in 1959.
