= Vladislav Titov =

Soviet writer

Vladislav Andreevich Titov
- Vladislav Titov
- Born: November 7, 1934; Voronezh Oblast, Russian SFSR, Soviet Union
- Died: May 1, 1987 (aged 52); Soviet Union
- Occupations: Novelist, miner
- Writing career
- Notable awards: Shevchenko National Prize

Vladislav Andreevich Titov (Russian: Владислав Андреевич Титов; November 7, 1934 – May 1, 1987) was a Soviet socialist realist writer. At the age of 26 he lost both arms in a coal mine accident. He became a novelist, writing with a pen held by his teeth, and produced several novels, the most famous being Defying death (Russian: «Всем смертям назло»).

== Life and accident ==
Titov was born into a wheat farmer's family in Voronezh Oblast. After serving in the Soviet Army, he completed a course at the College of Mines in Voroshilovgrad and started working at one of the new coal mines of Donets Basin.

In 1960 he became involved in a serious accident. A loaded coal carriage derailed, hit a high-voltage cable, and short-circuited it. The resulting fire ran along the cable to the power transformer and would have caused an explosion, burying alive the entire shift of miners. Hoping to save his co-workers, Titov rushed to the transformer and managed to shut it down, but by doing so he exposed himself to high voltage. Doctors saved his life and an injured leg, but both his arms had to be amputated up to the shoulders.

After a long recovery period, Titov became a writer, scribbling on paper with a pen held by his teeth.

== Writing career ==
Titov's first novel, Defying Death, is autobiographical in nature and focuses on the mental problems a healthy young man develops after a serious accident. Physical pain, an inability to find employment, and the sense of being a burden to people put him on the verge of suicide. He manages not only to recover his mental balance but also begins to help others cope with their psychological problems.

Defying Death was published in 1967 in the literary periodical Youth rather than as a separate book. This was a common practice at the time in the Soviet Union, especially for new writers. The novel quickly became popular. During the years following its publication, Titov received about 50,000 letters from disabled people asking for advice. The novel was included in the list of essential literature for secondary education and translated into 28 languages.

Titov wrote the novels Feather Grass Growth in Steppe (Russian: Ковыль - трава степная, 1971), Partition (Russian: Раздел, 1973), and Drift Miners (Russian: Проходчики, 1982), in addition to a number of short stories. His last completed novel was Old Park's Dreams (Russian: Мечты старого парка), which was published by his wife after his death at the age of 53. He left an uncompleted novel entitled Rye (Russian: Рожь).
