= Vint (given name) =

Vint is a masculine given name. Notable people with the name include:

- Vint Cerf (born 1943), American computer scientist
- Vint Harper, a fictional character
