= Tartu Art School =

Art school in Tartu, Estonia

- Tartu Kunstikool
- Former names: Tartu Visual Art School
- Type: Upper secondary vocational school
- Established: 1951; 75 years ago
- Affiliations: ArtECult
- Director: Kadi Kreis
- Students: 120 (2012)
- Location: Tartu, Estonia; 58°22′52″N 26°43′13″E
- Website: Official website

Tartu Art School (Estonian: Tartu Kunstikool) is an upper secondary vocational art school in the city of Tartu, Estonia. TAS provides study programs for aspiring decorator-stylists (interior designers), print media designer-desktop publishers, 3D-modellers and illustrators.

== History ==
The history of Tartu Art School is closely linked to the Tartu National Art Institute and therefore to the influential Pallas art school which was renamed the Konrad Mägi Higher State School of Art in the early Soviet era. In 1944 the school adopted the name National Art Institute of Tartu.

In the 1940s the institutions that provided higher art education in Estonia were in both Tallinn and Tartu. However, at the end of the decade the Soviet Council of Ministers ruled that the National Art Institute of Tartu be united with the National Art Institute of Tallinn, concentrating all the higher education in art in the capital. The only function that the former National Art Institute of Tartu performed at the time was preparing future students set for the institute in Tallinn and training aspiring art teachers.

Tartu Visual Art School opened its doors on July 1, 1951 which is also considered the official birthday of Tartu Art School (the name was officially changed in 1960). In its first year of existence only courses in art pedagogy were taught with sculpting, decorating and fashion design disciplines being added to the curriculum during the next few years. The next couple of decades were a time of stable growth for TAS. During the 90's the school moved to its own building on Tähe street. TAS relocated again in early 2010 and is currently situated on Eha street (Eha 41) in the district of Karlova in Tartu.

== Organization ==
Students who enroll at Tartu Art School can choose one of four disciplines: interior design (decorator-stylists), print media design-desktop publishing, illustration and 3D-modelling. In addition to basic art studies (drawing, painting, graphics, sculpting, composition, typography, chromatics etc.), TAS study programs include animation and photography. Depending on the field of study, students need to have graduated from a primary school or a secondary school. A youth contest which has been held for nearly 6 years gives a few aspiring TAS students a chance to enroll at the school without having to take the entrance exams. Students graduate after 3.5 years. The academic year begins in September and is divided into two semesters. Additionally, TAS has individual study programs for adults. About 50 teachers work at TAS and the current headmistress is Kadi Kreis (since August 2000).

== Traditions ==
- A travelling trophy – the Golden Pencil - is awarded to the artist who has shown exceptional skill in drawing every semester. The panel who determines the recipient consists of the resident art teachers. The prize was first conceived by a drawing teacher at TAS, Udo Vool. The prize was first issued during the fall semester of 2010.
- The 24-hour comics event was launched in 2003 and lasted until 2009. The patron of the event was a TAS art teacher Peeter Krosmann, however, the idea originated from the American cartoonist Scott McCloud. The purpose of the event was to draw a page of a graphic novel in an hour with the ultimate goal of creating 24 pages of material.

== Notable alumni ==
Many influential artists on the Estonian and international art scene have graduated from Tartu Art School including:

- Ellinor Aiki
- Kalli Kalde
- Kaarel Kurismaa
- Lembit Lõhmus
- Leonhard Merzin
- Enno Ootsing
- Tiit Pääsuke
- Ahti Seppet
- Agaate Veeber
- Kuno Veeber

== Connection to Tartu Art College ==
Tartu Art College was founded on the 1st of August 2000. It provides undergraduate level art education and is closely linked to Tartu Art School as a large percentage of the TAS graduates continue their studies at the college. The two biggest art schools in Tartu are situated right next to each other and also share a portion of the faculty and the facilities.
