= Jüri Arrak =

Estonian artist (1936–2022)

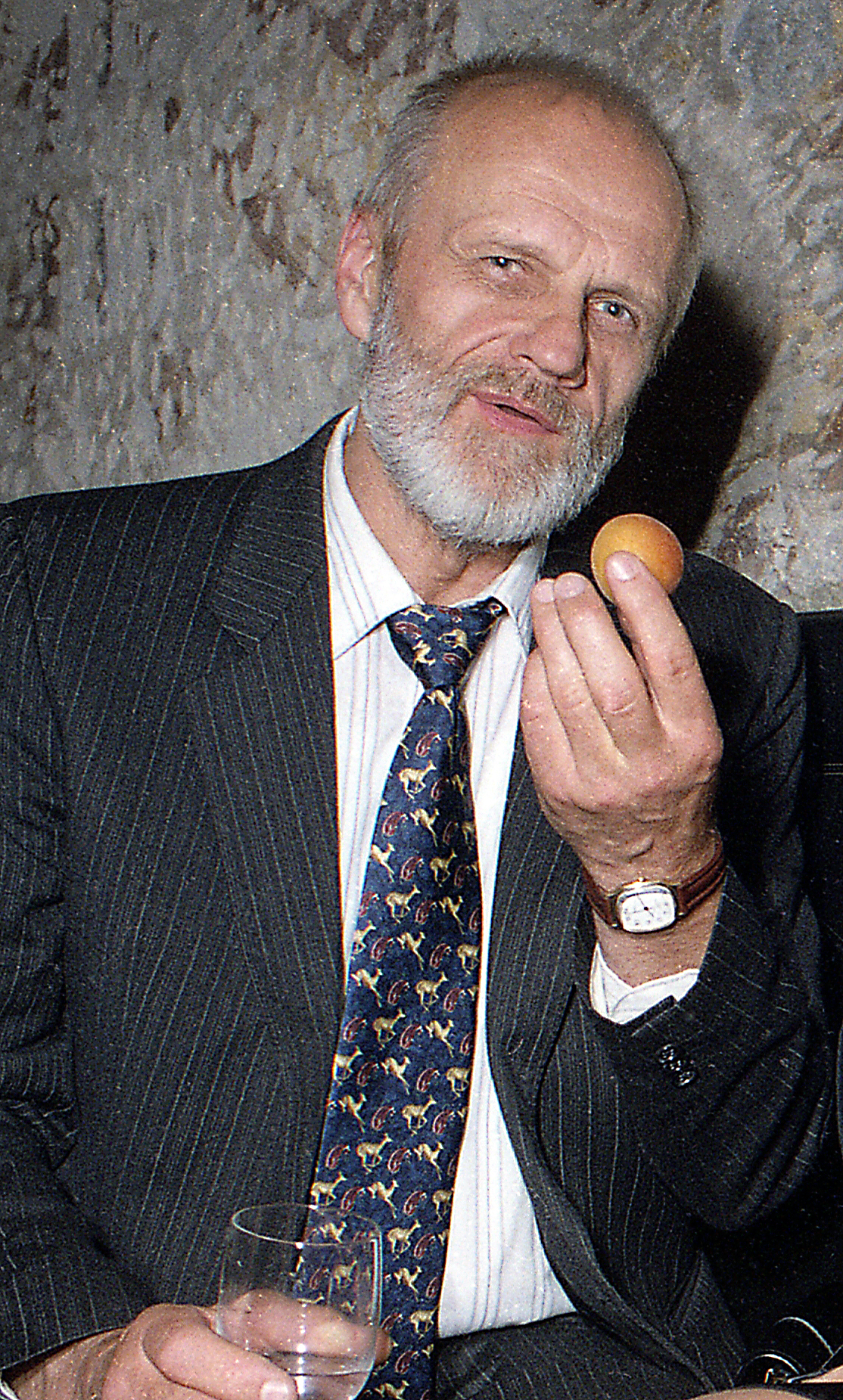
Arrak in 1996

Jüri Arrak (24 October 1936 – 16 October 2022) was an Estonian painter, whose works with distinguished and recognizable style have won acclaim around the world.

Arrak was born in Tallinn on 24 October 1936, and graduated from the Estonian State Art Institute. He was a member of the Estonian Artists' Association and a member of the European Academy of Sciences and Arts.

Arrak's works are represented in Estonian Museum of Art, Tallinn, Estonia; Museum of Modern Art, New York; New Orleans Museum of Art, US; Tretyakov Gallery, Moscow, Russia, and the Ludwig Art Museum, Cologne, Germany.

Arrak died on 16 October 2022, at age 85.

== Awards ==
Arrak was awarded the II Class of Order of the White Star by the President of Estonia in 2000.
