= Aili Vint =

Estonian graphic designer and painter (born 1941)

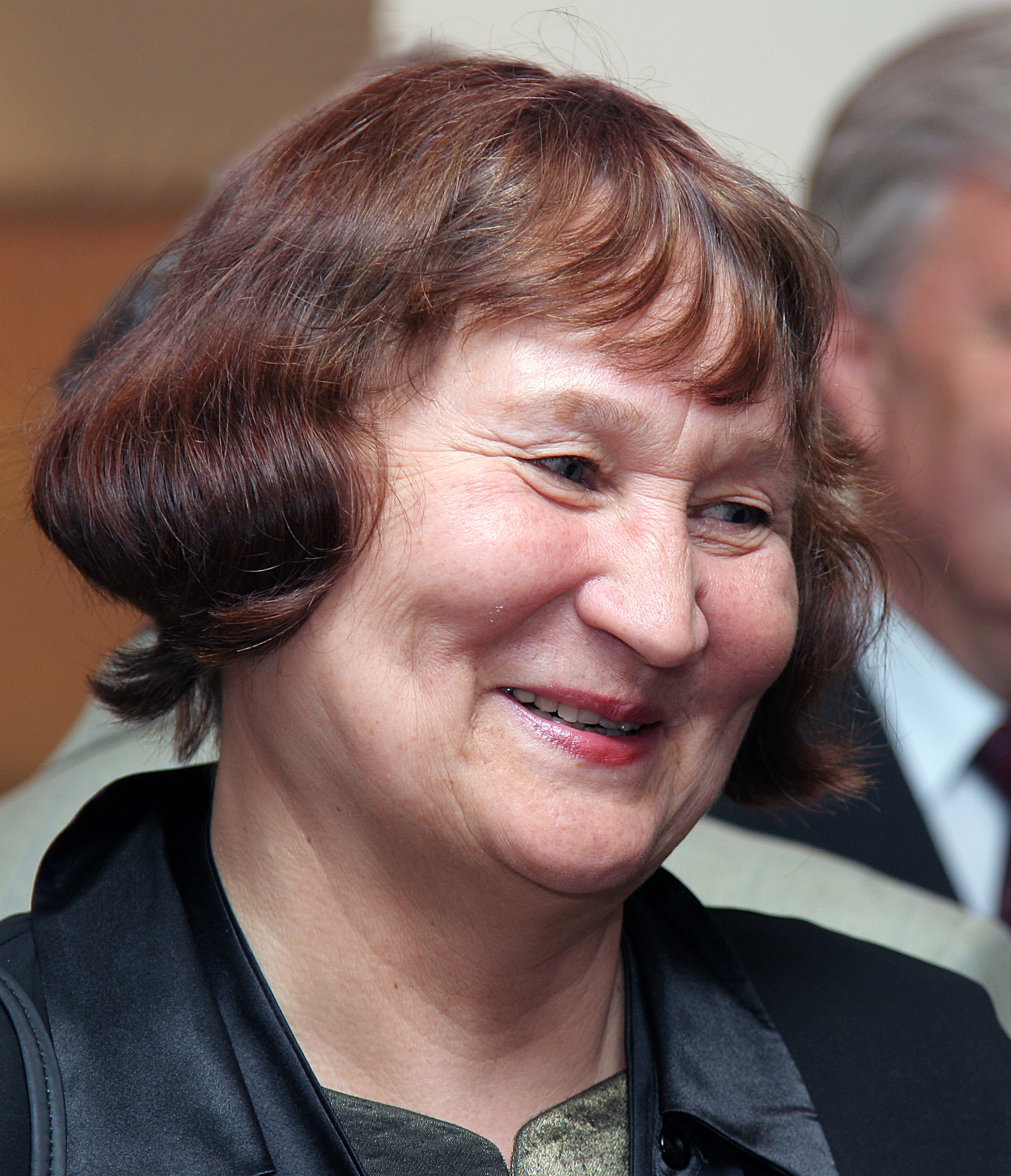
Aili Vint

Aili Vint (born 25 April 1941) is an Estonian graphic designer and painter.

In 1967, she graduated from Estonian State Art Institute.

1964–1970, she was a member of ANK '64. Since 1970, she is a freelance artist.

== Awards ==
- 1994: Konrad Mägi prize
- 1994: City of Pärnu prize
- 2002: Order of the White Star, IV class
- 2015: Kristjan Raud prize
