= Tõnis Vint =

Estonian graphic artist (1942–2019)

Tõnis Vint (22 April 1942 – 22 June 2019) was an Estonian graphic artist, considered by some to have been one of the most important artists of the 1960s to 1980s in Estonia.

== Biography ==
Vint was born in Tallinn. His exhibition in the city's art museum, KUMU, continued to September 9, 2012. Alongside it, KUMU published a book, Tõnis Vint and his aesthetic universe.

Vint was influenced by the art of China and Japan, by psychoanalysis, and by comparative analysis of ornaments from different cultures. Vint's frequent use of bold lines and sharp contrast has drawn comparisons to the work of Aubrey Beardsley.

== Literature ==
- Tõnis Vint and His Aesthetic Universe. KUMU, 2012. ISBN 978-9949-485-09-3
