= Ihaste =

Neighbourhood of Tartu, Estonia

Coordinates: 58°21′10″N 26°47′2″E

- Neighbourhood of Tartu
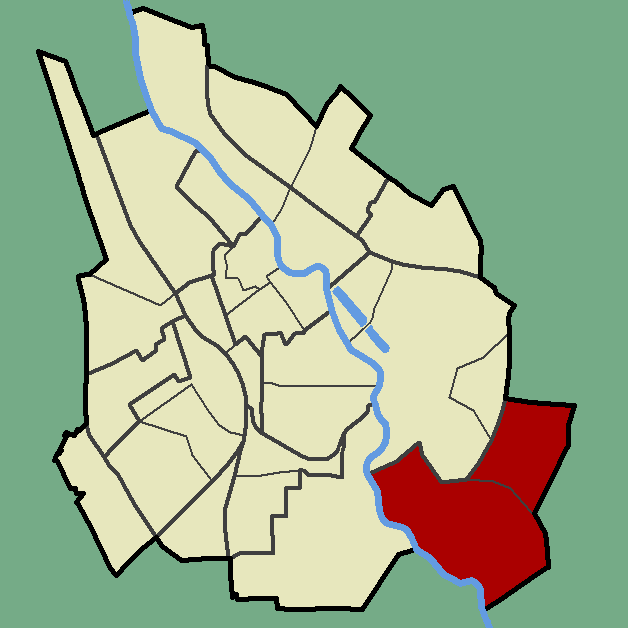
- Location of Ihaste in Tartu.
- Country: Estonia
- County: Tartu County
- City: Tartu

Area
  - Total: 4.24 km^{2} (1.64 sq mi)

Population (31.12.2013)
  - Total: 2,497
  - Density: 589/km^{2} (1,530/sq mi)

Ihaste is the suburban neighbourhood of Tartu. It is located about 4 km southeast of the centre of the town, south of Annelinn, on the left bank of Emajõgi River. Ihaste has a population of 2,497 (as of 31 December 2013) and an area of 4.24 km^{2} (1.64 mi^{2}).

== See also ==
- Anne Nature Reserve
