= Mart Lepp =

Estonian art collector (born 1947)

- Born: December 28, 1947 (age 78); Tallinn, then part of Estonian SSR, Soviet Union
- Occupation: Art collector

Mart Lepp (born December 28, 1947) is an Estonian art collector and the owner of the largest art collection in Estonia. His art collection includes nearly 25,000 works. Much of his art collection was assembled through inexpensive purchases or for free, as gifts from artists or their relatives.

== Early life ==
Mart Lepp was born in Tallinn in 1947. He graduated from Tallinn Evening High School No. 10 (now Tallinn Adult High School) in 1969.

== Collection ==
His art collection, which initially included 300 works—mainly etchings by Western European and Russian painters of the 19th century, as well as paintings, sculptures, and graphics by Estonian artists (August Weizenberg, Kristjan Raud, Eduard Wiiralt, Paul Burman, Aleksander Vardi, and Ferdi Sannamees)—was founded by his mother Selma Lepp (1911–1977). Lepp started collecting graphics in 1961, and in 1972 he started focusing on Estonian painting. The collection also includes watercolors, drawings, and sketches. He has held a series of exhibitions of his collection and published folder series, catalogs, and bibliophile publications. Lepp has also written books on botany.

Very large collections have developed for the most important artists in the overall collection. There are over a thousand works by individual artists. Large collections by several individual artists in Lepp's collection include the works of Aleksander Vardi, Jüri Arrak, Valdur Ohakas, Olav Maran, Olga Terri, Vive Tolli, Peeter Mudist, Richard Kaljo, Felix Randel, Johannes Uiga, Johannes Saal, Elmar Kits, and Eduard Ole.
