= Villem Ormisson =

Estonian painter (1892–1941)

- Born: Wilhelm Aleksander Ormisson; July 28, 1892; Perst, Viljandi County, Governorate of Livonia, Russian Empire
- Died: April 5, 1941 (aged 48); Tartu, Estonia
- Education: Riga City Art School
- Occupations: Painter, teacher

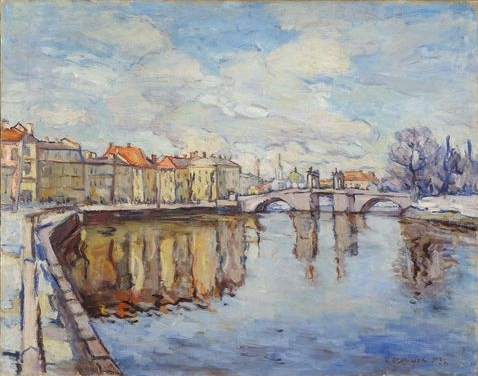
Villem Ormisson, Tartu vaade (View of Tartu, oil, 1937)

Villem Ormisson (born Wilhelm Aleksander Ormisson; July 28, 1892 – April 5, 1941) was an Estonian painter and art teacher.

== Early life and education ==
Villem Ormisson was born in Pärsti in Viljandi County, at that time part of the Governorate of Livonia in the Russian Empire, the son of Andres Ormisson (1856–1918) and Anna Ormisson (née Piir, 1863–1945). Ormisson studied at Heine High School in Viljandi and Hugo Treffner High School in Tartu, and then from 1910 to 1914 at the Riga City Art School. At the Riga City Art School, he studied drawing under Jānis Tilbergs and painting under Vilhelms Purvītis, both of whom were pupils of the Saint Petersburg Academy of Arts. From Purvītis, the preeminent Baltic landscape painter of his time, he mastered the skill of depicting the flickering of air and water, which remained unsurpassed in Estonian art during his lifetime. In 1922, he studied art for two months in Berlin and Dresden.

== Career ==
Ormisson first exhibited his works in Estonia in February 1914 at the Fourth Estonian Art Exhibition organized by Young Estonia at the Vanemuine theater in Tartu.

Starting in the fall of 1914, he worked as an art teacher at several schools in Viljandi (for the longest period, eight years, at the girls' high school of the Estonian Education Society in Viljandi), and then in 1926 he became a drawing and painting teacher at the Pallas Art School in Tartu. From 1929 to 1940, he was also the school's assistant principal. As an assistant principal, his duties included everything related to the students' lives, and he resolved disputes that arose with fairness. As an instructor for the painting class, Ormisson was considerate; he never painted over the students' works or forced them to do as he wanted, nor did he particularly like to theorize about art. When evaluating works, he avoided emotional evaluations; he did not offer direct criticism, but he was also short on praise. Most of the top artists that entered Estonian art in the 1930s received their initial painting lessons from Ormisson.

In 1920, Ormisson joined the Pallas art association, and he participated in its exhibitions from then on. He was the chairman of the association from 1927 to 1928, assistant chairman from 1928 to 1930, and again chairman from 1930 to 1931 and from 1935 to 1936.

Shocked by the development of events during the Second World War, Villem Ormisson committed suicide in 1941. The Soviet authorities quickly realized his "dangerousness": exhibitions by the artist, who had already died by then, were among the first to be banned at the Tartu Art Museum in 1948.

Contemporaries remembered Ormisson as a very kind-hearted, quiet, even reclusive person that opened up only in the company of close friends. Because of his calm and balanced mind, he was often called the "justice of the peace" and the "arbiter of disputes." Painting, playing chess at Café Werner, and fishing were the three great passions of his life. Villem Ormisson's final resting place is in the Old Cemetery in Viljandi.

== Works ==
Ormisson mainly created landscape paintings and still lifes, and to a lesser extent portraits. In his early works, the influences of Impressionism (primarily Matisse and Cézanne) and the work of Konrad Mägi can be noticed; after visiting Germany in 1922, Expressionist features appeared in his work, the color darkened, and a greenish-blue tone became predominant. In the 1930s, Ormisson painted more Impressionistic landscapes, in which winter views of Tartu, full of peace and endlessly falling snow, hold a special place. From time to time, he deliberately imitated the techniques of some great masters; Leila Anupõld called this "playing with the masters." The peak achievement of Ormisson's late work is the 3 × 5 meter panel Pühajärv (Holy Lake) in the Vanemuine theater, completed in 1939.

- 1914: Lilled aknal (Flowers on a Window)
- 1915: Kirju vaip, Mustlane (Colorful Carpet, Gypsy)
- 1919: Maastik majadega (Landscape with Houses)
- 1920: Natüürmort ümmargusel laual (Still Life on a Round Table)
- 1924–1926: Mehe portree, Karl Ormisson (Portrait of a Man, Karl Ormisson)
- 1927: Linnavaade (City View)
- 1927: Õunad vaibal (Apples on a Carpet)
- 1929: Elva maastik (Elva Landscape)
- 1929: Talvine Tartu maastik (Tartu Winter Landscape)
- 1930: Tartu maastik (Tartu Landscape)
- 1934: Varemed (Ruins)
- 1937: Jõemaastik (River Landscape)
- 1937: Tartu vaade (View of Tartu)
- 1938: Kevadine Taevaskoda (Heavenly House of Spring)
- 1938–1939: Maastik (Landscape)
- 1939: Pühajärv (Holy Lake, panel)
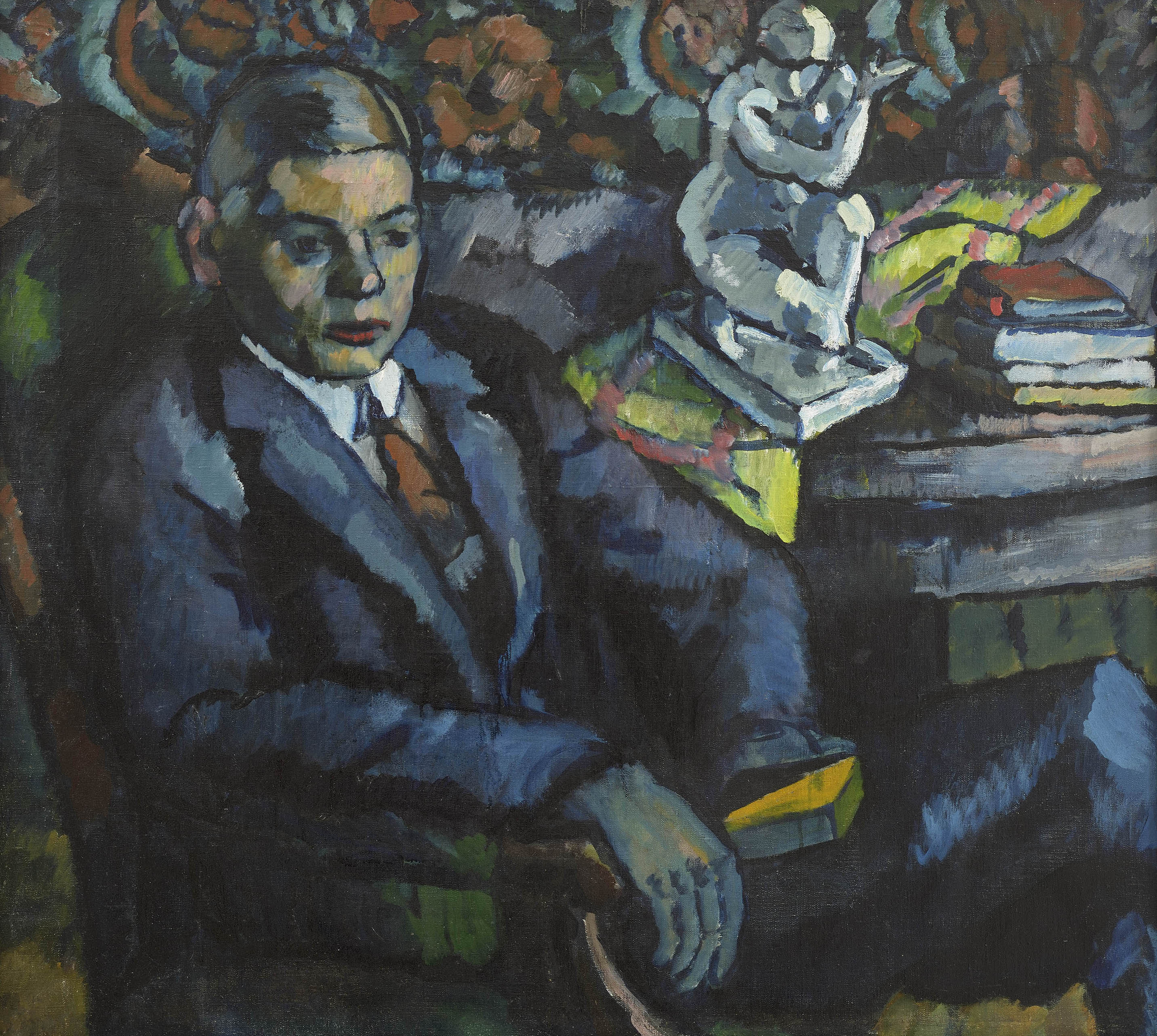
Mehe portree, Karl Ormisson (Portrait of a Man, Karl Ormisson, 1924–1926)

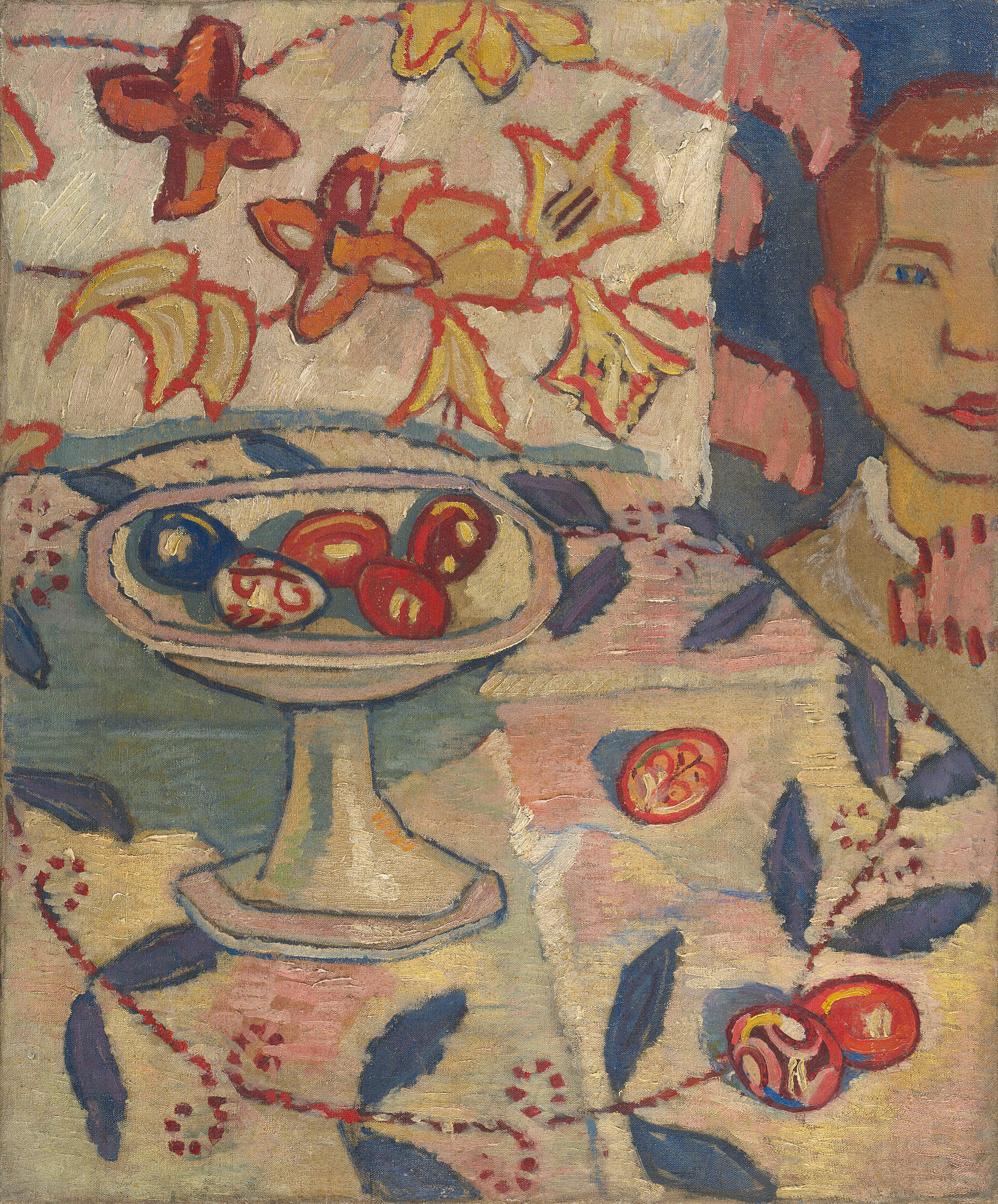
Natüürmort värvitud munadega (Still Life with Colored Eggs, 1914–1918)

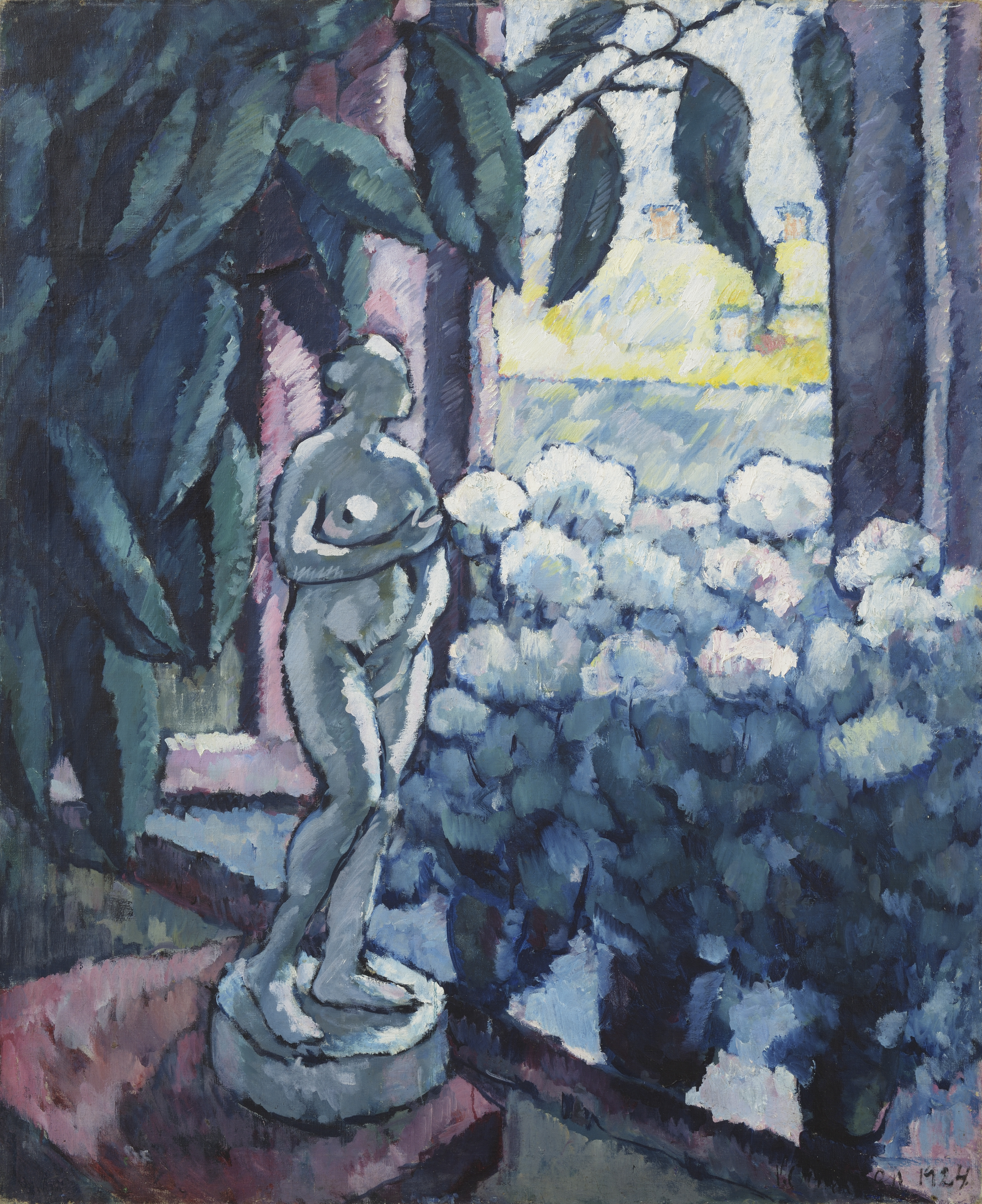
Natüürmort lilledega aknal (Still Life with Flowers on a Window, 1924)

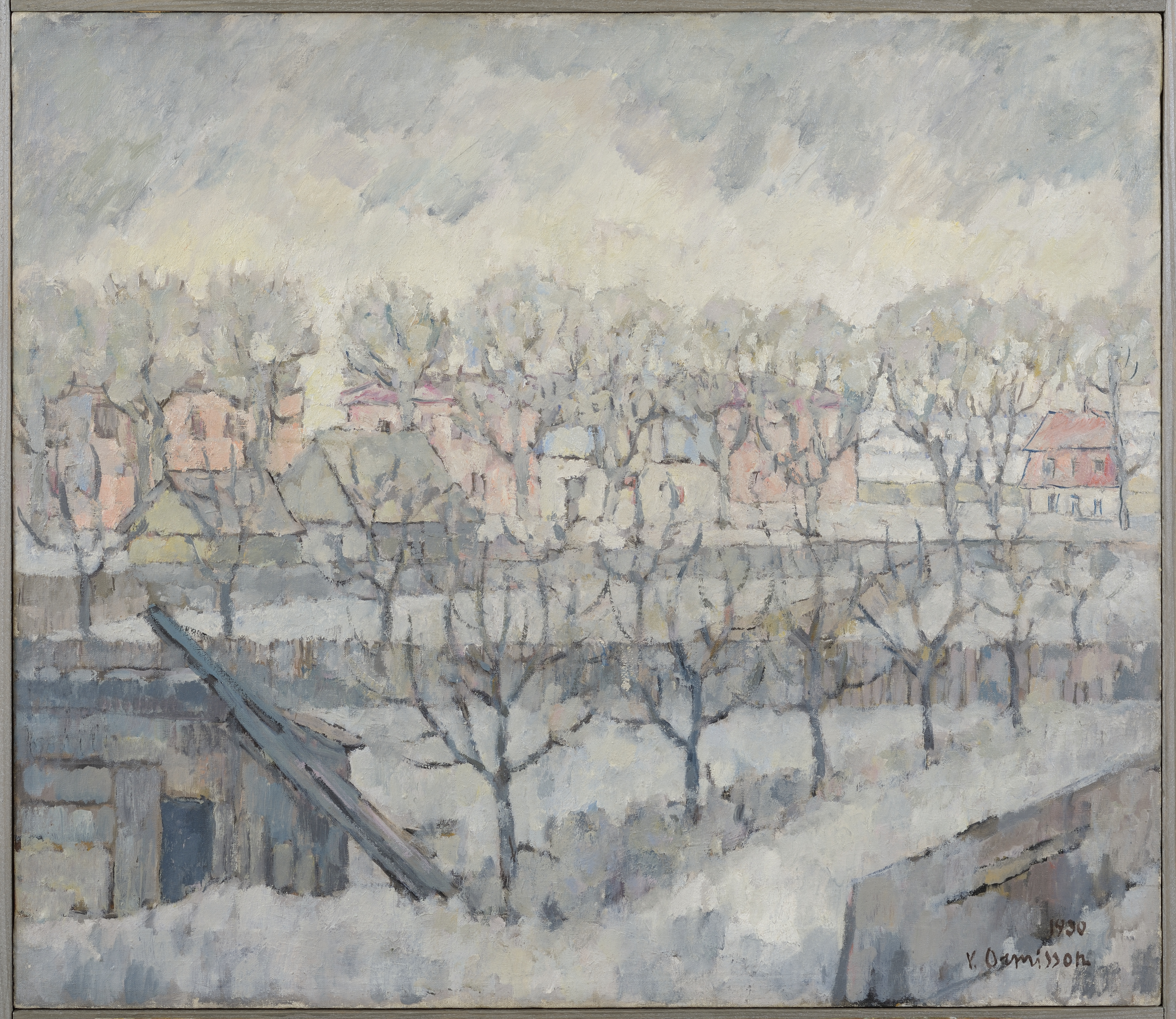
Tartu maastik (Tartu Landscape, 1930)

== Exhibitions ==
- 1914: First appearance in Estonia at the Fourth Estonian Art Exhibition organized by Young Estonia at the Vanemuine theater, Tartu
- 1919: overview exhibition of Estonian art in Tallinn
- 1920 onward: Pallas art association exhibitions (Tartus, Viljandi, etc.)
- 1926: Exhibition of the Central Association of Estonian Visual Artists
- 1929: Exhibition of Estonian art in Paris, Kiel, and Lübeck
- 1930, 1931, 1938: Fine Arts Endowment Government Exhibitions
- 1931: in Helsinki
- 1935: in Moscow
- 1937: in Kaunas and Riga
- 1939: in Rome, Budapest, Warsaw, and Krakow
- 1948: Villem Ormisson memorial exhibition at the Tartu National Art Museum (soon taken down as "formalist art" unsuitable for the new society)
- 1964: Exhibition at the Tartu National Art Museum
- 1992: Villem Ormisson's 100th birthday representative exhibition at the Viljandi Art Hall
- 1992: Villem Ormisson's 100th birthday exhibition at the Tartu Art Museum
- 2002: To celebrate the 110th anniversary of Villem Ormisson's birth, two smaller exhibitions—one at the Viljandi Museum and the other at the Kilpkonna Gallery in Viljandi—and the largest exhibition so far at the Ugala theater building

== Legacy ==
- The year 2002 was declared Ormisson Year in Viljandi, which was celebrated with various events: planting a linden at the artist's birthplace at the former Rehtla farm in the village of Oksa; two smaller exhibitions (one at the Viljandi Museum and the other at Viljandi's Kilpkonna Gallery) and one large exhibition of Ormisson's work at the Ugala theater building; and an art conference at the Ugala theater building.
- A street in the Ihaste district of Tartu is named in honor of Villem Ormisson.
- In 2018, the Park Hotel was opened in Viljandi, and its Ormisson Cafe was named to commemorate the artist.
