= LEPP =

LEPP may refer to:

- Pamplona Airport in Pamplona, Spain, ICAO airport code LEPP
- Laboratory for Elementary-Particle Physics at Cornell University
- Lepp, an Estonian surname
