= Annelinn =

Neighbourhood of Tartu, Estonia

- Neighbourhood
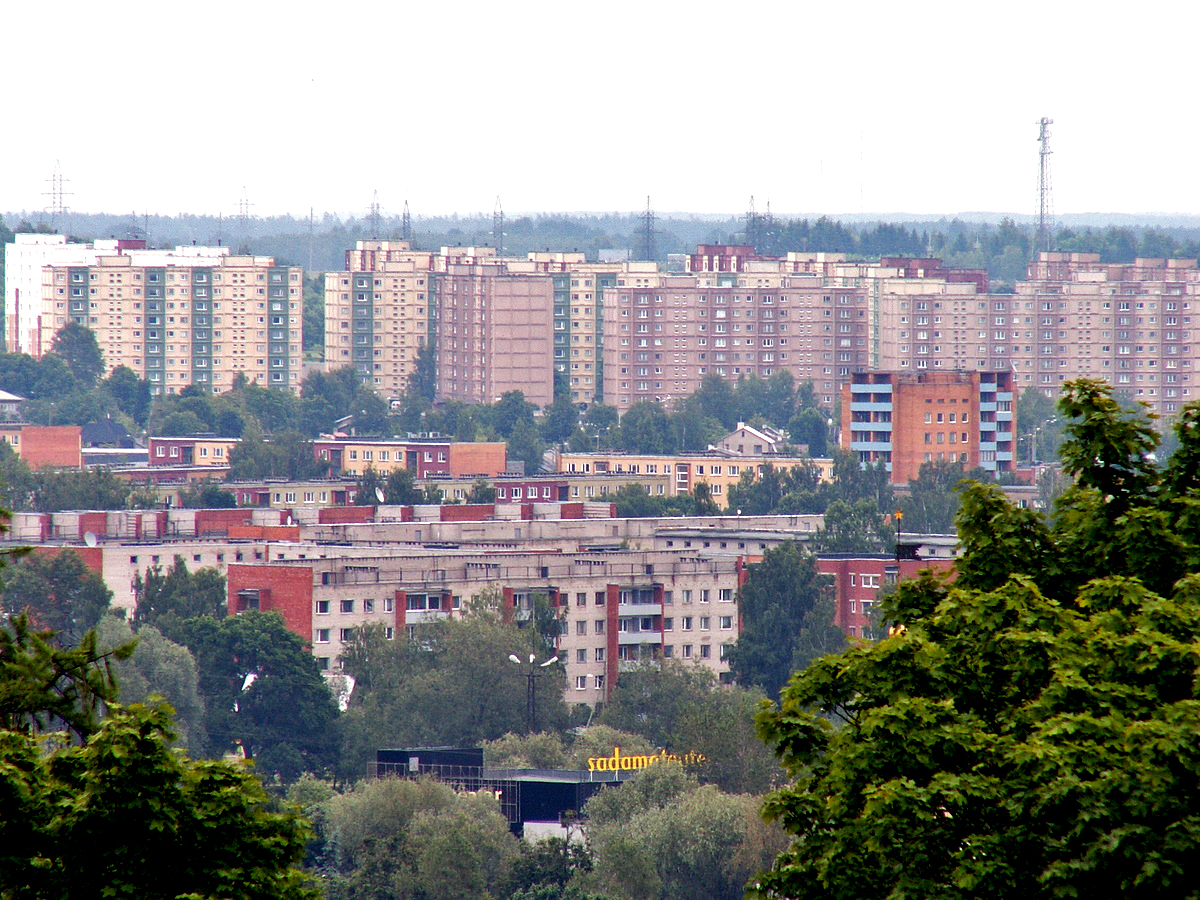
- Apartment blocks of Annelinn seen from the cathedral.

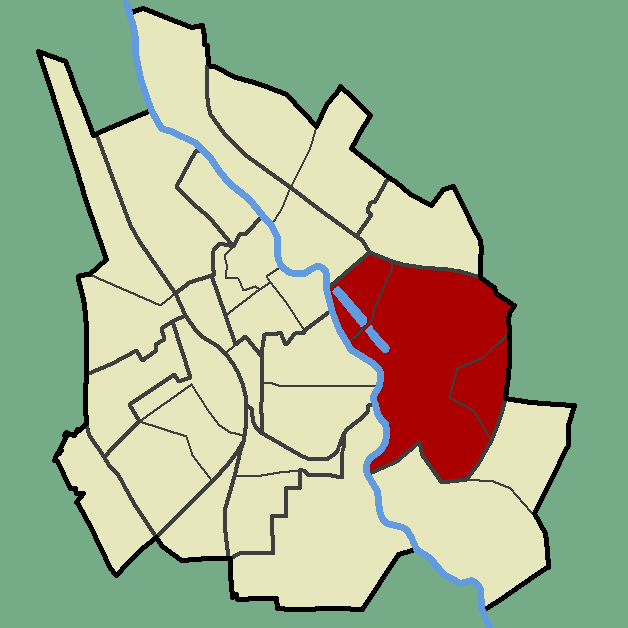
- Location of Annelinn in Tartu.
- Country: Estonia
- County: Tartu County
- City: Tartu

Area
  - Total: 5.40 km^{2} (2.08 sq mi)

Population (31.12.2013)
  - Total: 26,755
  - Density: 4,950/km^{2} (12,800/sq mi)

Drone video of Annelinn in Tartu, Estonia 2021

Annelinn (Estonian for "Anne's Town") is a neighbourhood of Tartu, Estonia, located on the left bank of Emajõgi River. It has a population of 27,755 (as of 31 December 2013), or 27.34% of the whole city's population. With an area of 5.40 km^{2} (2.08 mi^{2}), it is also the largest. Annelinn mainly consists of 5- and 9-story Soviet apartment buildings. The project was made between 1969 and 1973 by Mart Port and Malle Meelak from "Eesti Projekt". It was originally planned to consist of four microdistricts but only two were finished. Annelinn is planned with the shape of amphitheater with ascending relief, and an imaginary centre located on the watermeadow of the Emajõgi River.

== Schools ==
- Tartu Jaak Petersoni Gymnasium
- Tartu Descartes Lyceum
- Tartu Kivilinna School
- Tartu Hansa School
- Tartu Vene Lyceum

== Gallery ==
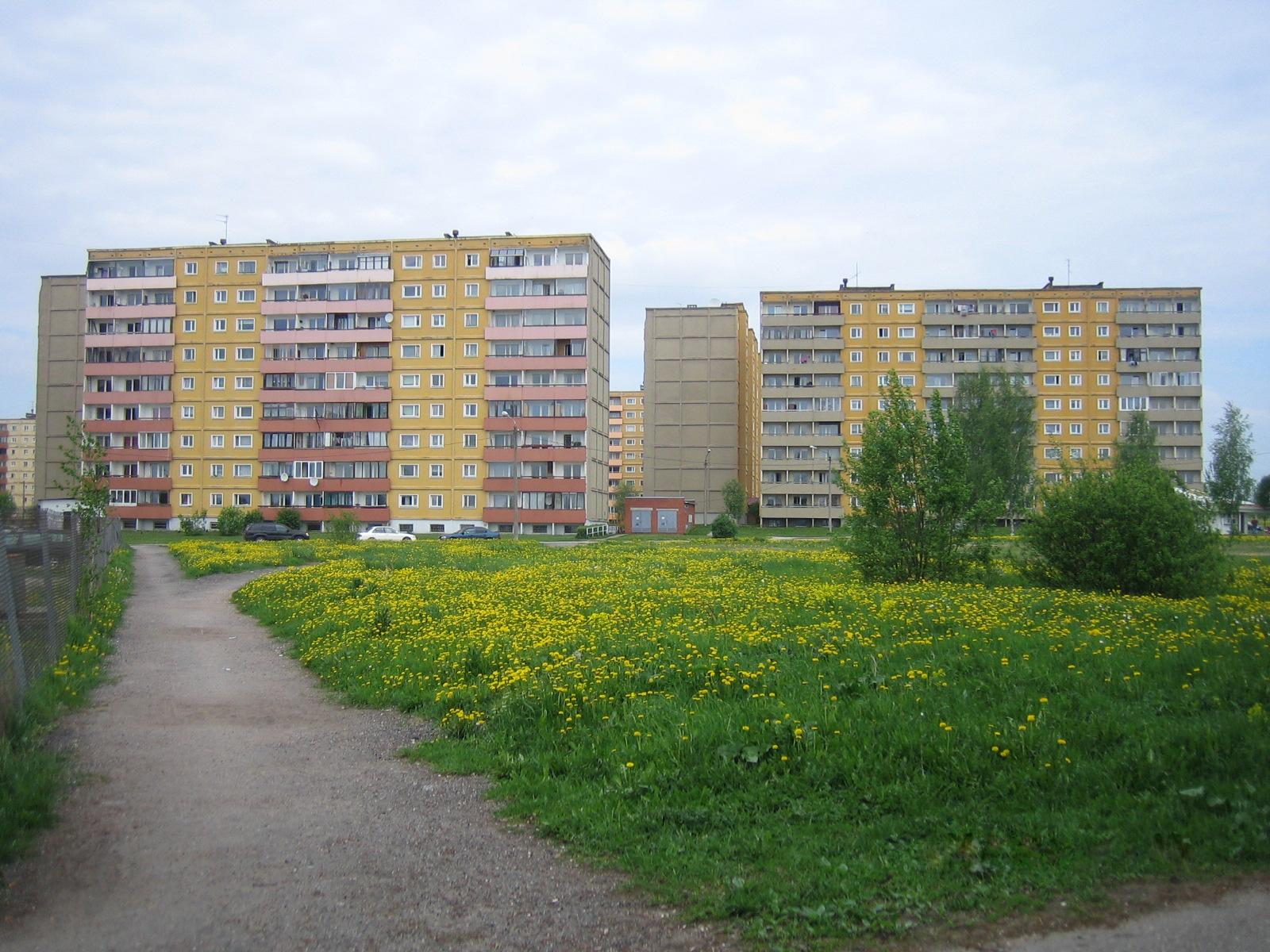

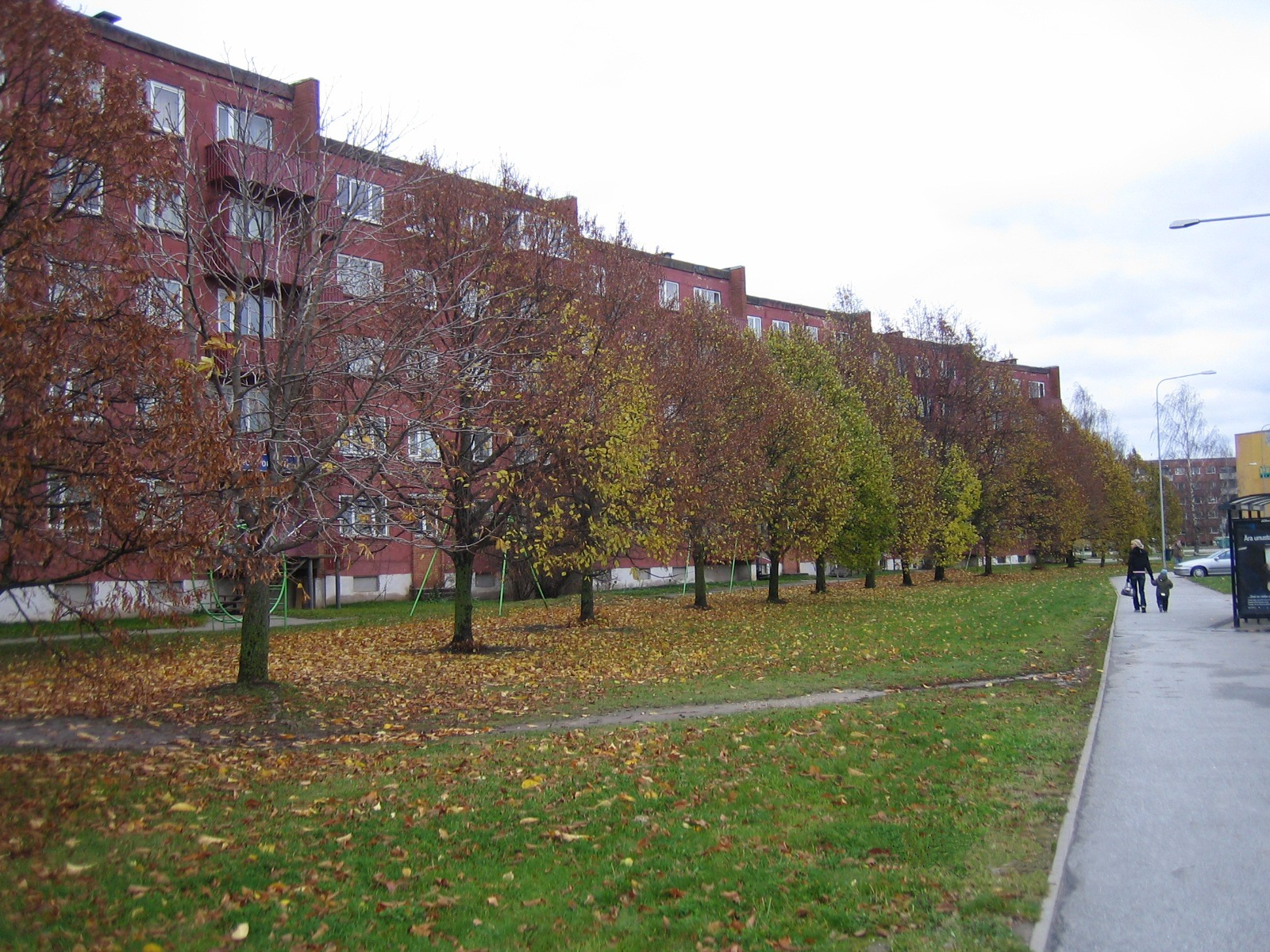

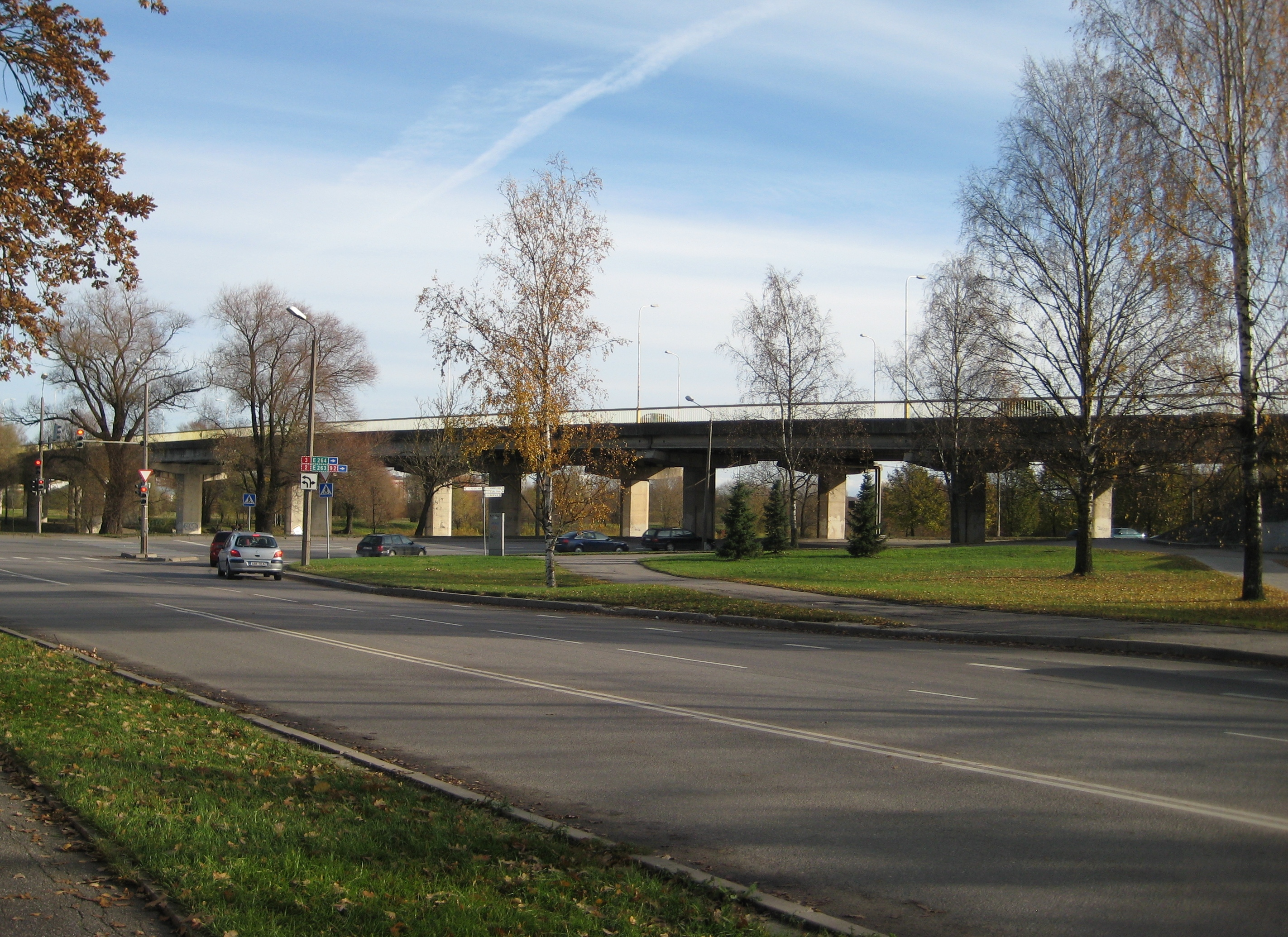
The Friendship Bridge (Sõpruse sild) connects Annelinn to Karlova over Emajõgi and Anne Canal.

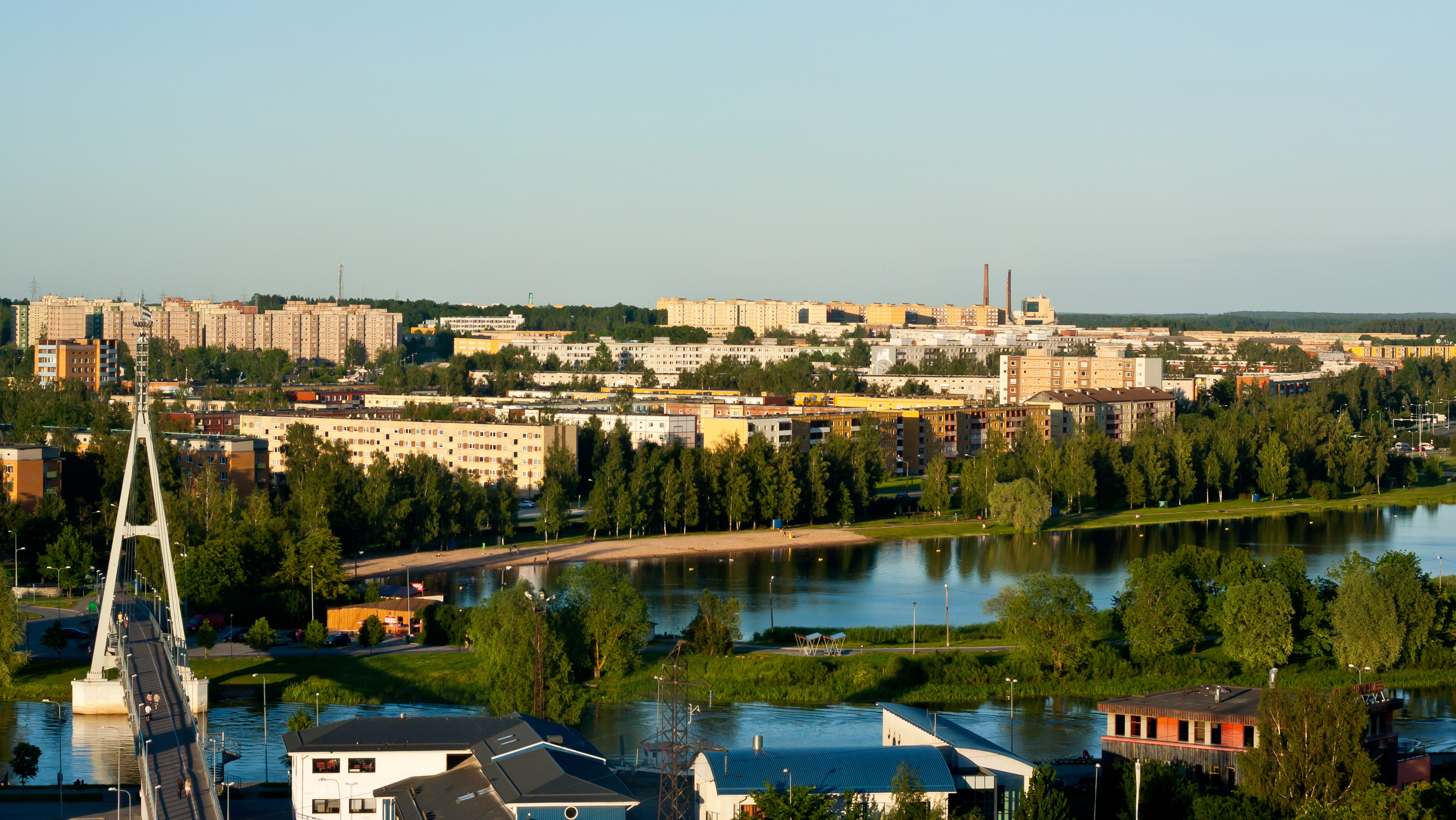
View from city center

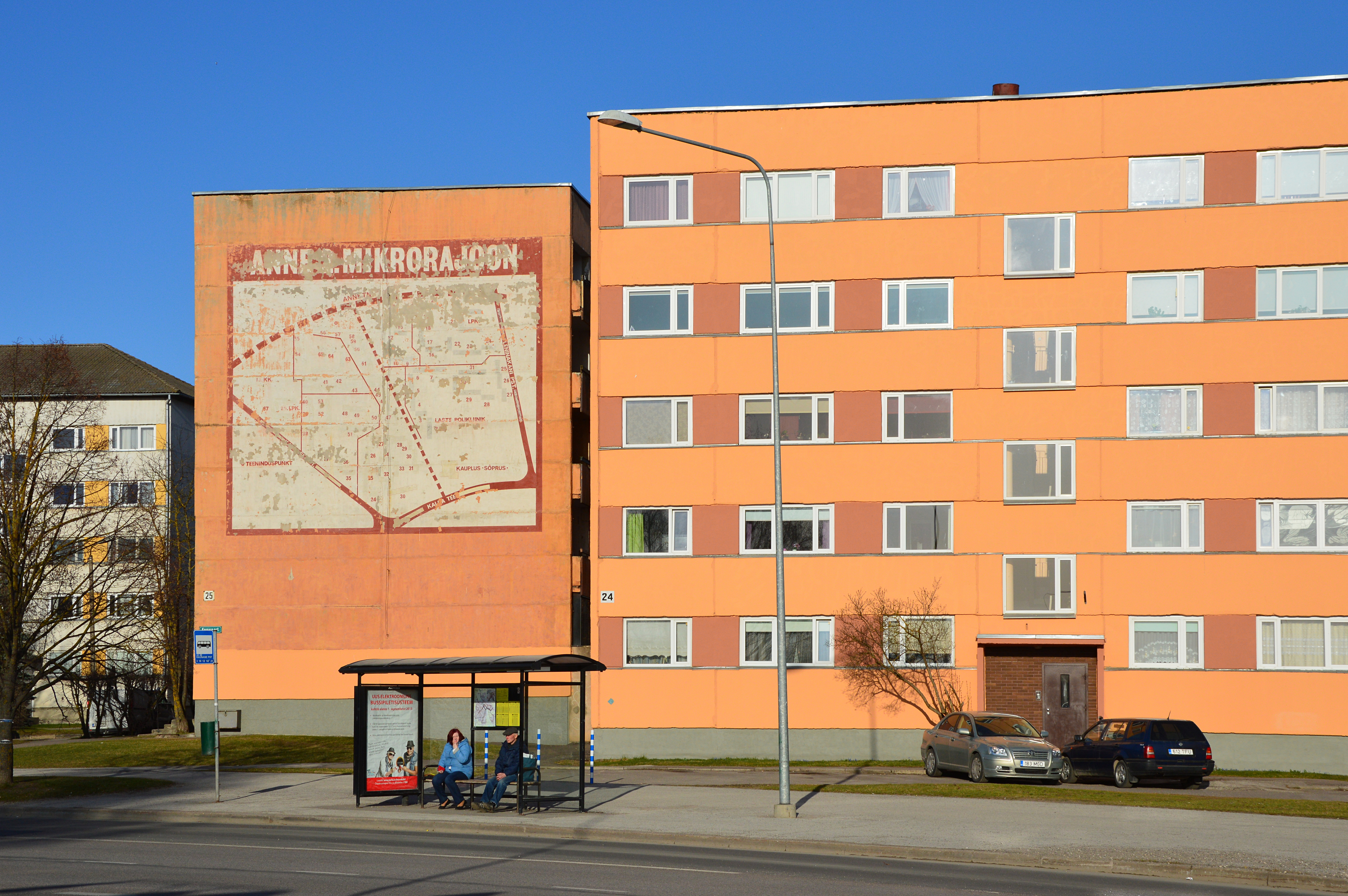

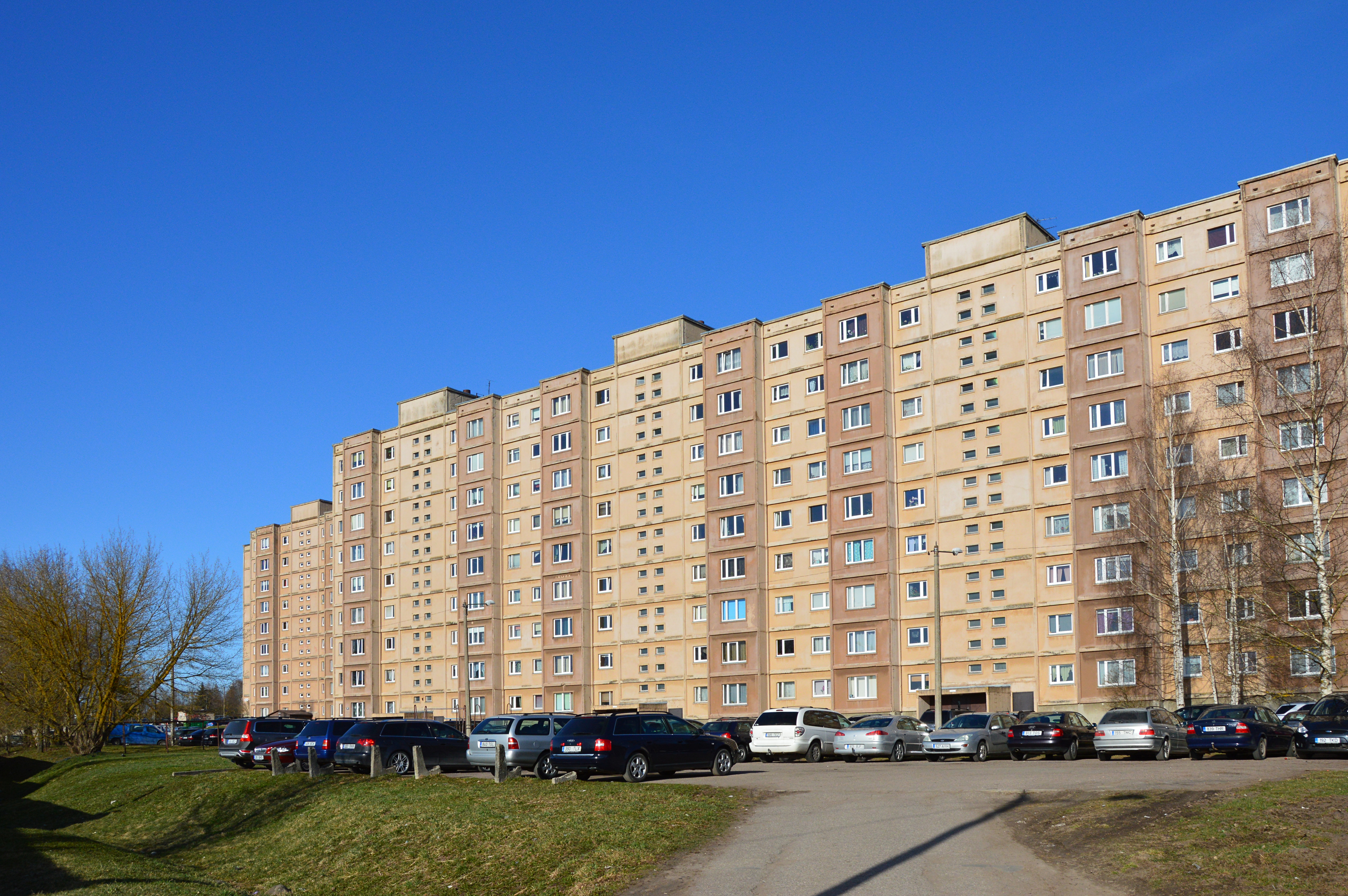

== See also ==
- Anne Canal
- Friendship Bridge, Tartu
- Anne Nature Reserve
