= Karl Burman =

Estonian architect and painter (1882–1965)

- Born: 17 May [O.S. 5 May] 1882; Sumy, Kharkov Governorate, Russian Empire
- Died: 10 May 1965; Tallinn, then part of Estonian SSR, Soviet Union
- Occupations: Architect, painter

Karl Burman sen. (17 May [O.S. 5 May] 1882 – 10 May 1965) was an Estonian architect and painter.

Burman was born in Sumy, Russian Empire. His younger brother was artist Paul Burman. In 1900 he attended the Stroganov Art School in Moscow, and then between 1901 and 1902 he attended the Stieglitz Art School in St. Petersburg (now Saint Petersburg Art and Industry Academy). Then he studied architecture at the St. Petersburg Academy of Arts throughout 1902–1909. He died in Tallinn, Estonia.

Romantik Burman was an exhibition celebrating his work at the Museum of Estonian Architecture from 19 June to 7 September 2003.

== Gallery ==
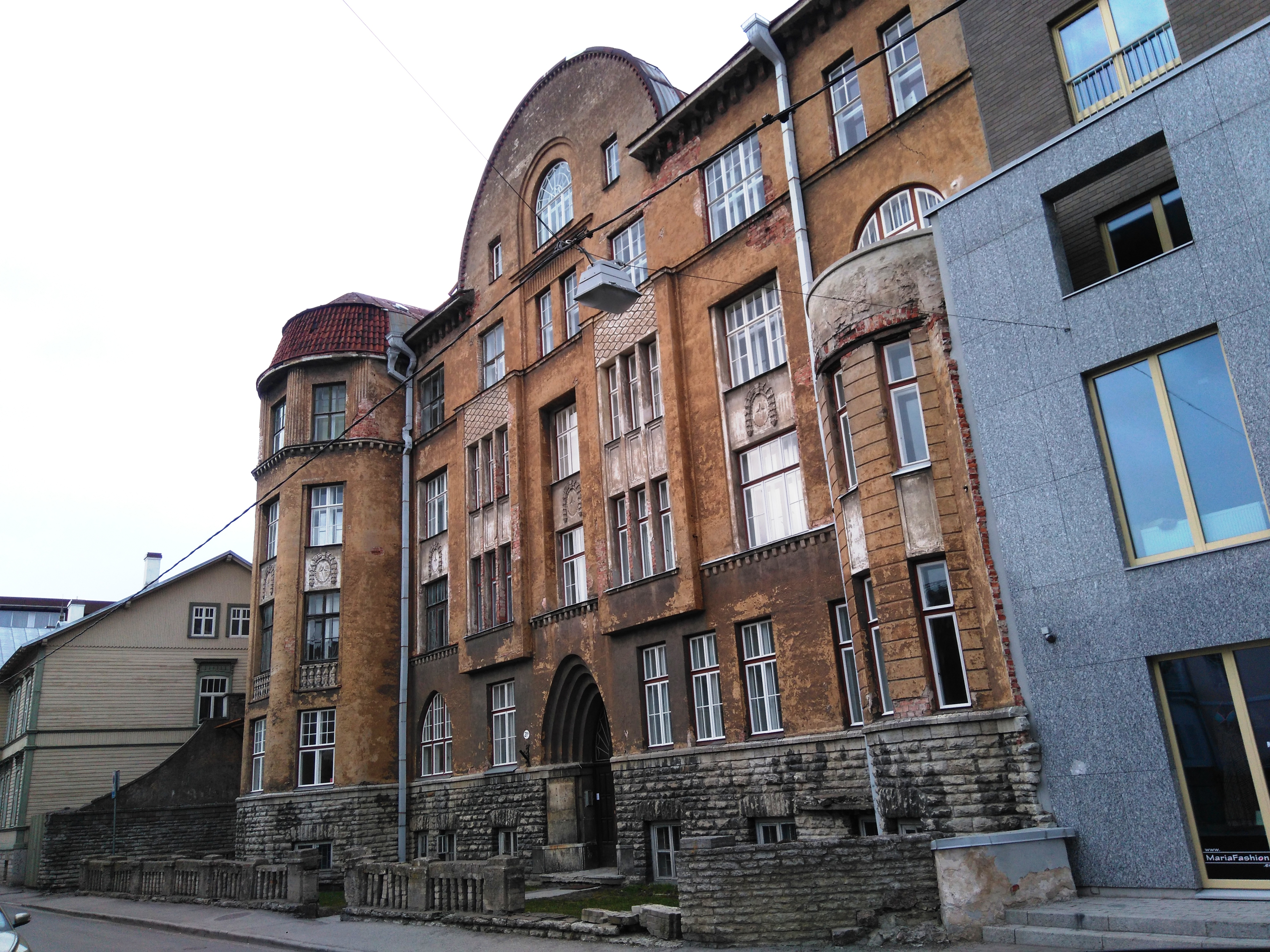
Tatar 21b

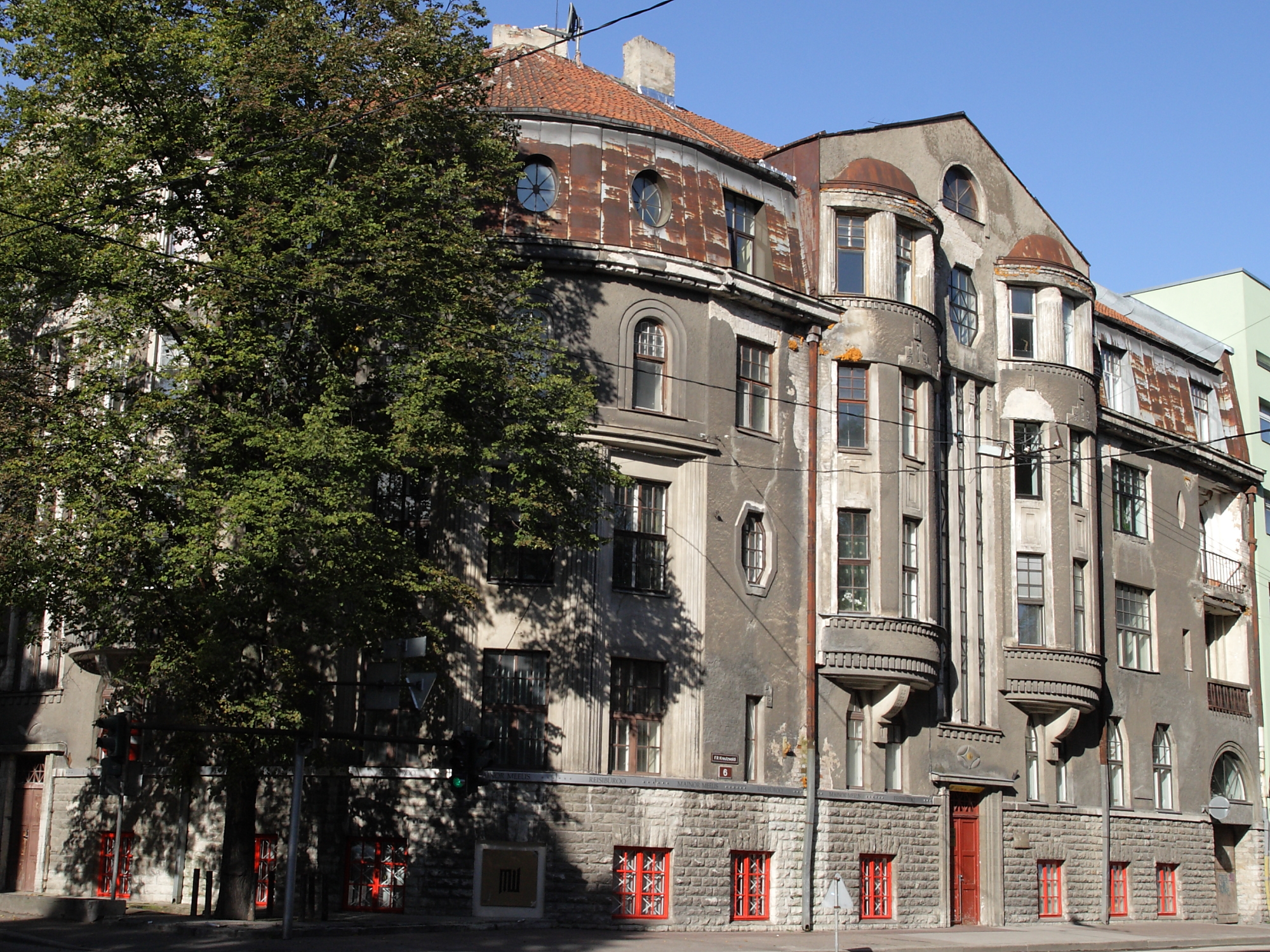
Rau 39 // FR Kreutzwaldi 6

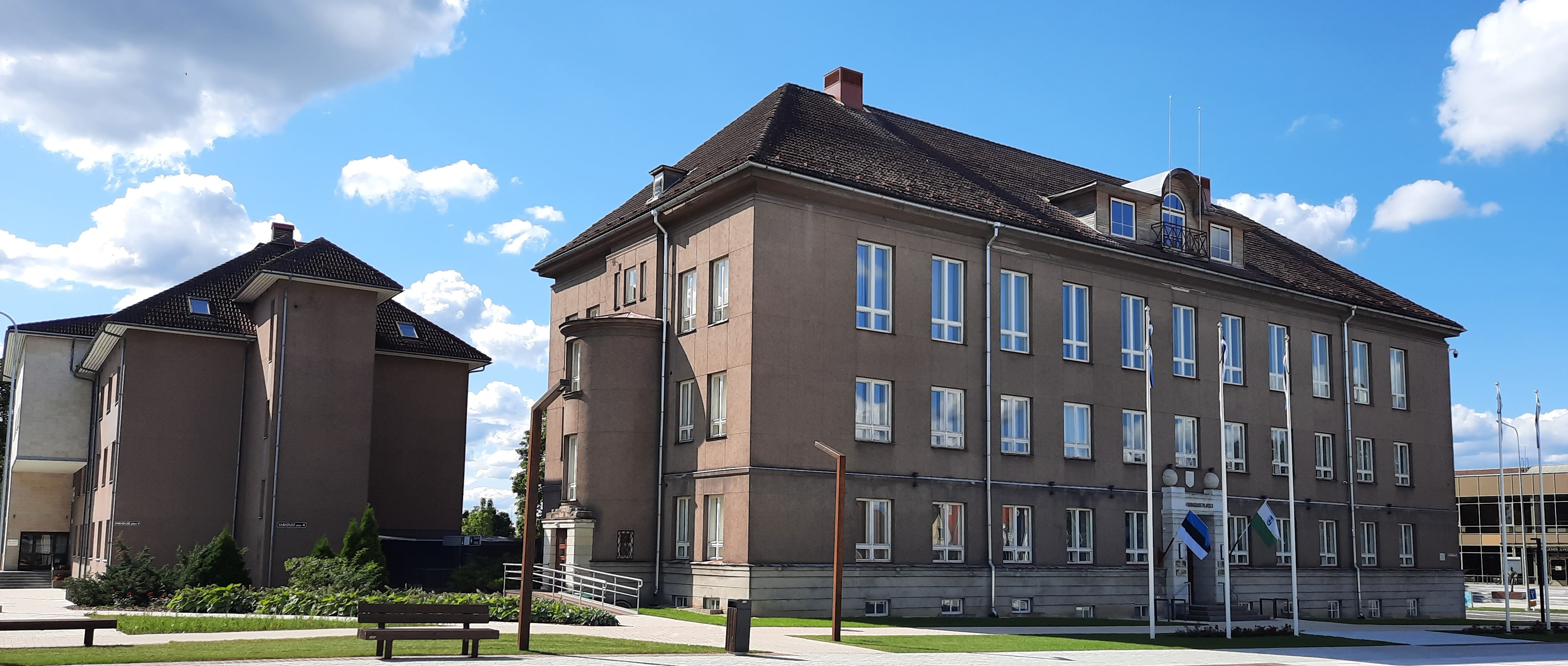
Viljandi branch of the Bank of Estonia

Munga 18, the original branch building of the Bank of Estonia in Tartu
