= Paul Burman =

Estonian painter (1888–1934)

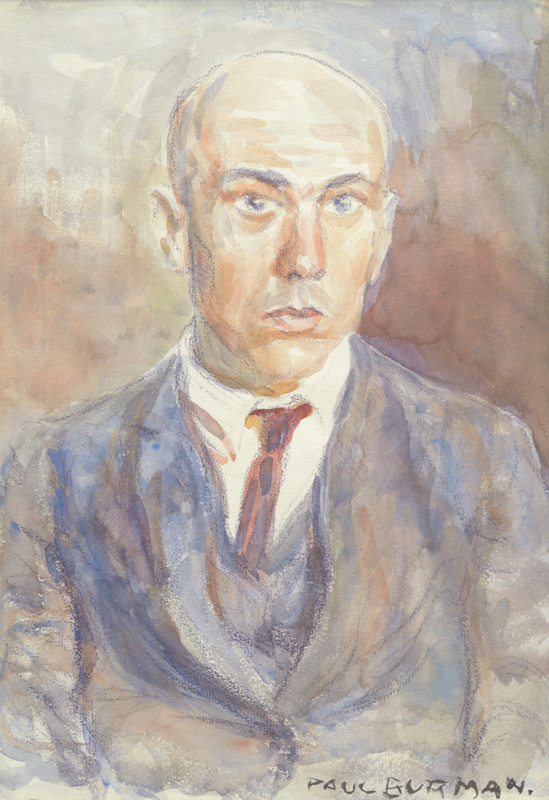
Paul Burman, self-portrait

Paul Burman (28 February 1888 in Kamianets-Podilskyi – 3 June 1934 in Tallinn) was an Estonian painter and graphic artist of Baltic German descent. He was the elder brother of architect and painter Karl Burman.

== Biography ==
Burman moved to Estonia with his family in 1892. The family had roots in the country. He studied at Peetri Reaalkool (now, Tallinna Reaalkool) in Tallinn. Between 1905 and 1906, he studied at Ants Laikmaa's studio school. From 1907 until 1908, he was an external student (Estonian: vabakuulaja) at the Imperial Academy of Arts in St. Petersburg. He studied at the Stroganov School of Art in Moscow from 1908 to 1909 and with Latvian painter Vilhelms Purvītis in 1911 at the Art Academy of Latvia.

In 1912, he stayed for a short time at the Académie Russe in Paris, and lived for about a year surrounded by the Estonian artist colony in Paris with Jaan Koort, Nikolai Triik and Aleksander Tassa. In 1914, he lived for a while in the Crimea and in Germany and returned to Estonia in 1915.

He is considered as the first Estonian animalier. Burman made many paintings of horses. In the initial period of his work, he mainly painted and drew animal and nature pictures, landscapes and still lifes. He also created some portraits, drawings, etchings, woodcuts and illustrated children's books (Koduloomad and Metsloomad, 1912).

His depictions of the city, flowers and landscapes are picturesque, bright in color and varied. He has been considered one of the first impressionists in Estonia. Later creation was more restless, the works expressive. Many of his works were destroyed in a fire during World War II, but many of them survived in various private collections.

== Gallery ==
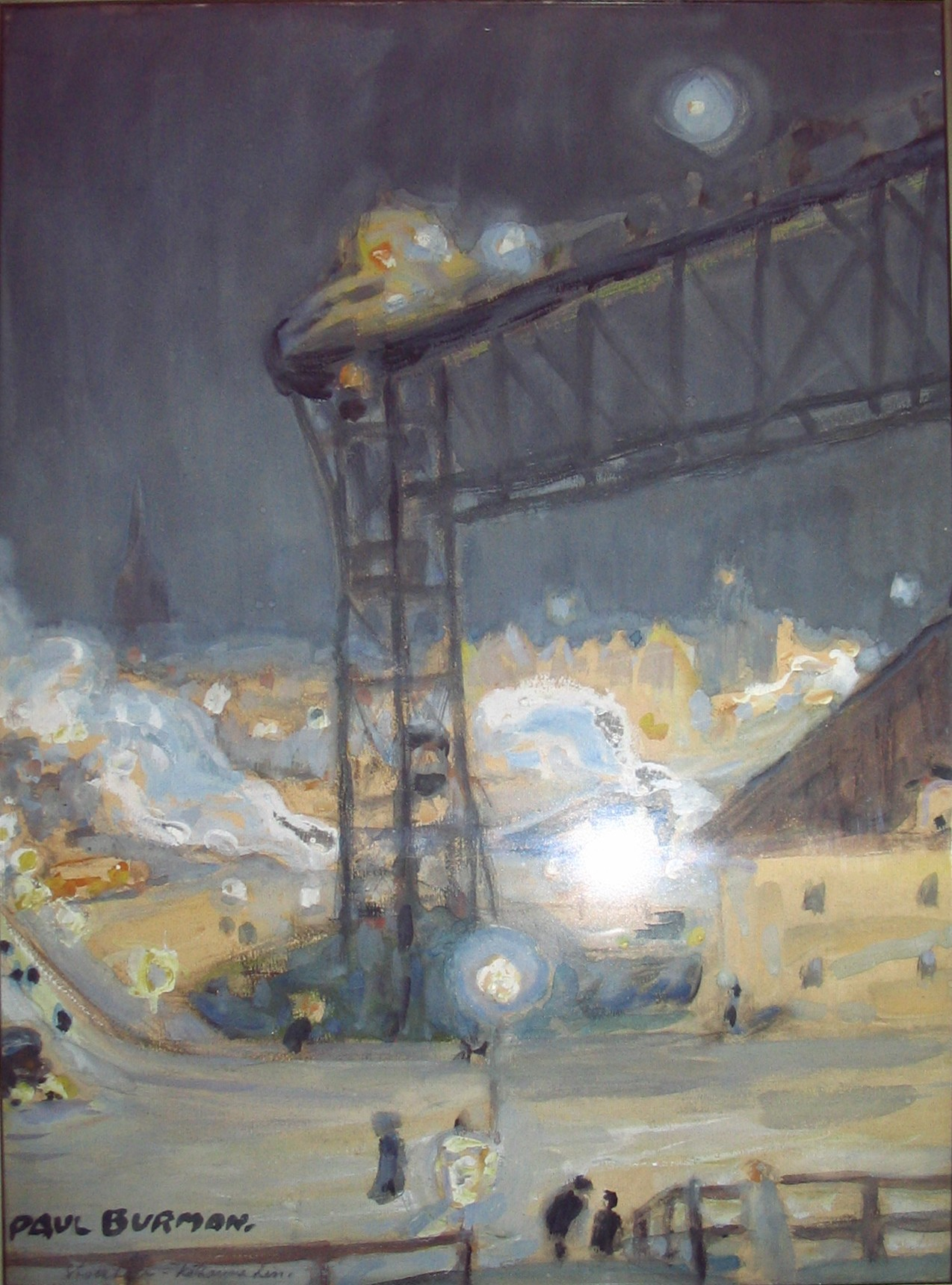
Katarina Elevator

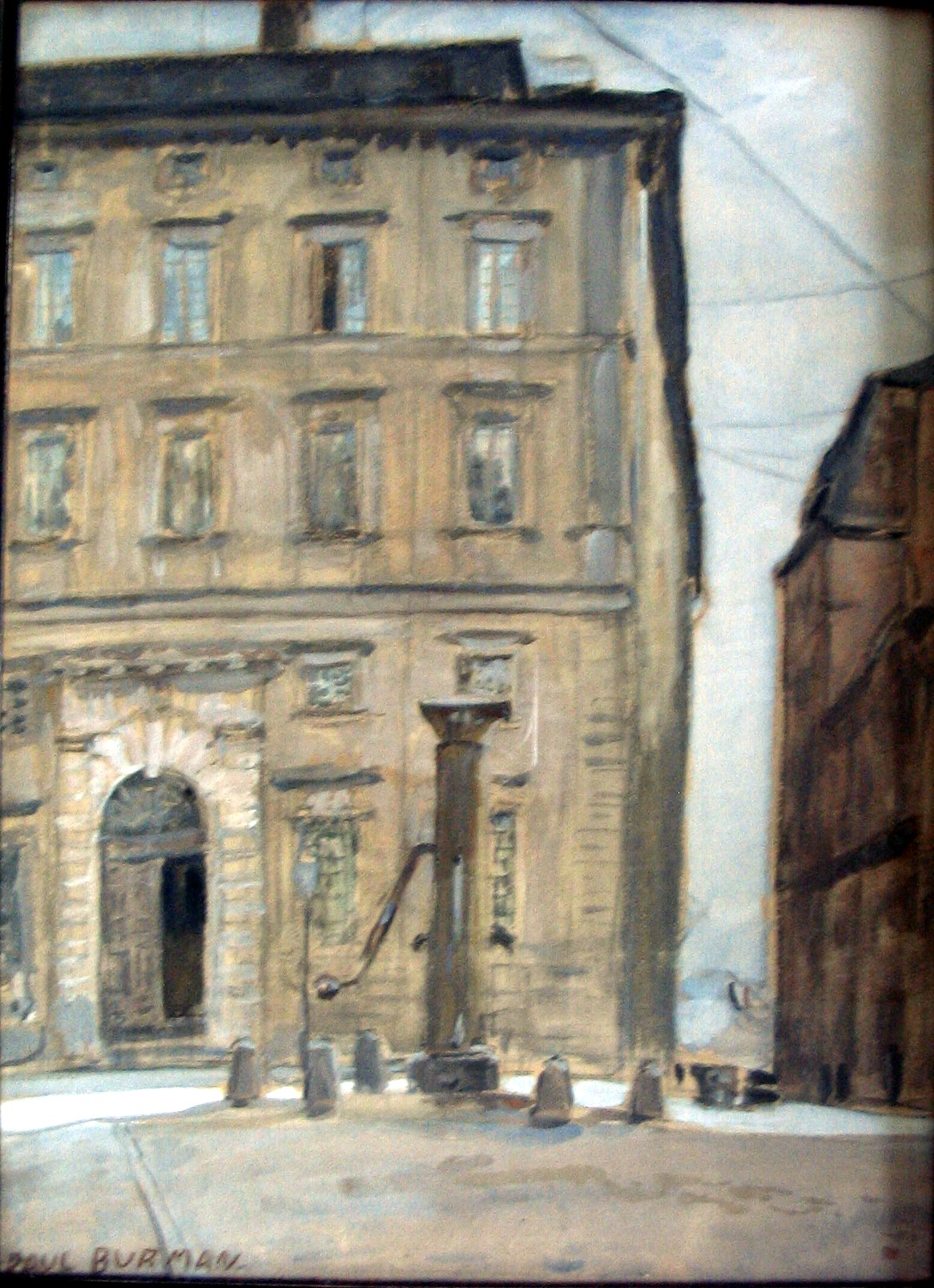
Stockholm

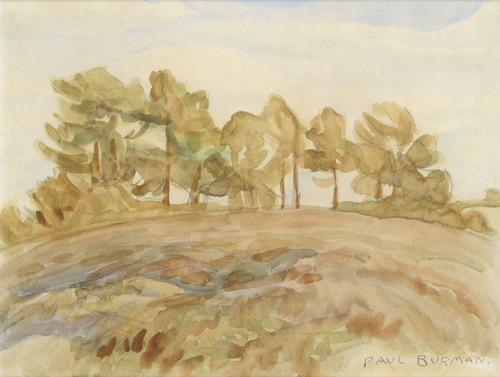
Motif of Stroomi beach

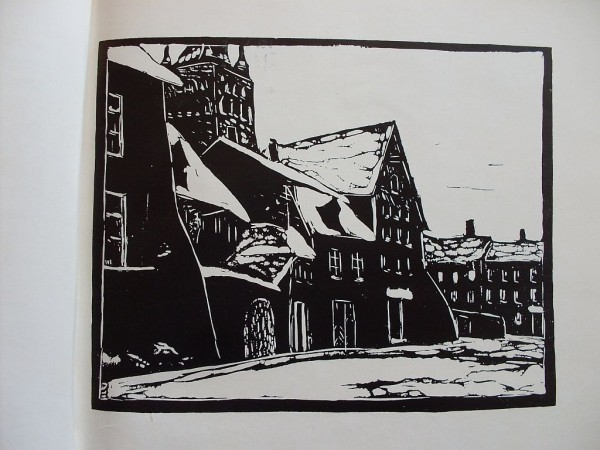
Tolli Street

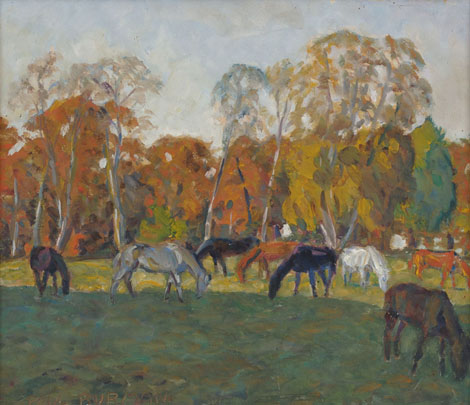
Landscape with horses

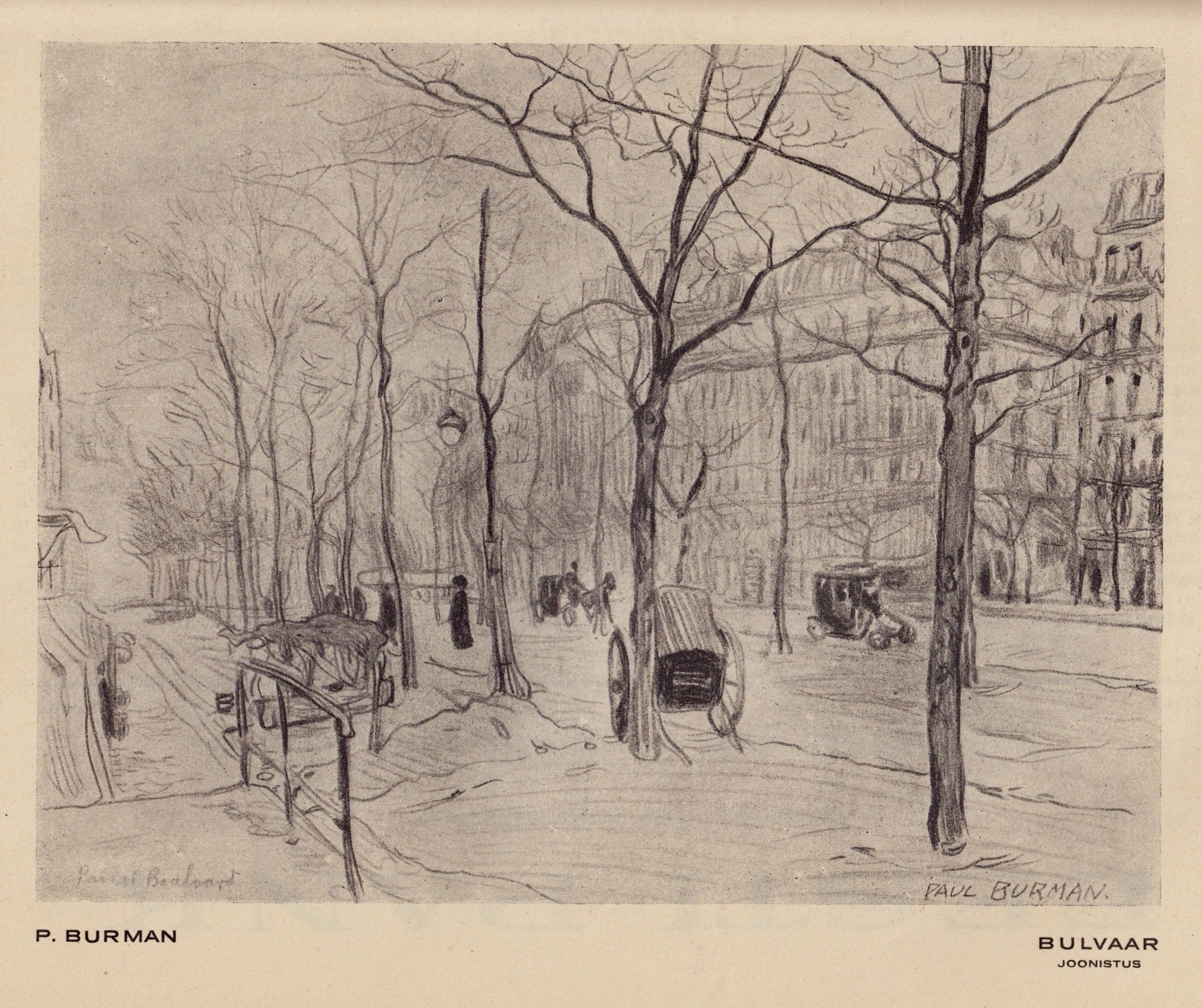
Boulevard

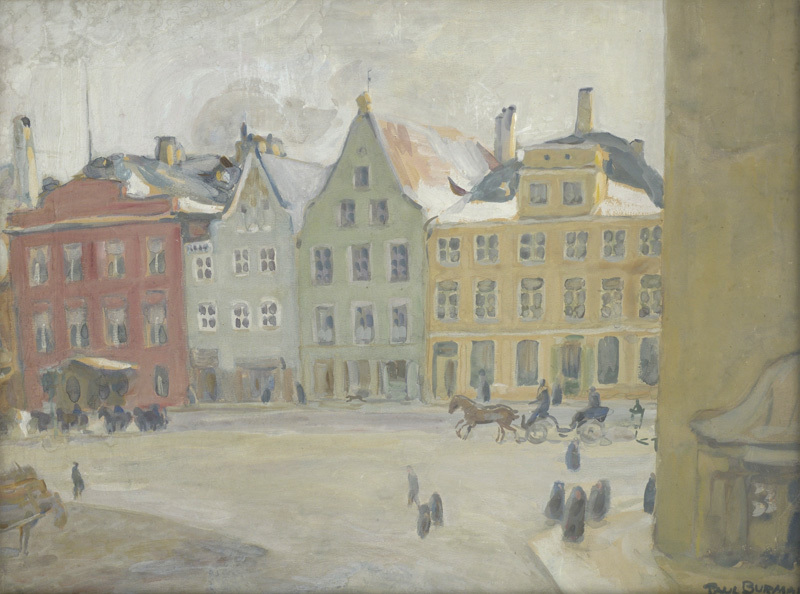
Raekoja plats

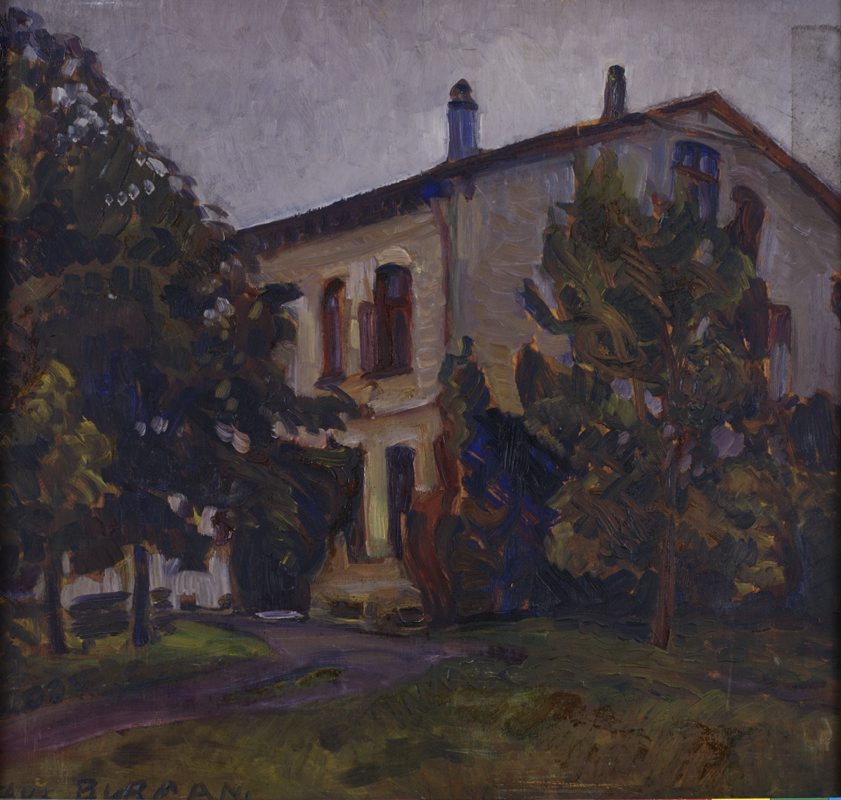
Landscape with a House
