= Pallas (society) =

Estonian art organization

Pallas is an Estonian art association, which was established in 1918 in Tartu. The association was re-established in 1988 in Tartu.

In 1919, the society established the Pallas Art School.

Notable members before 1940:

- Ants Laikmaa
- Konrad Mägi
- Villem Ormisson
- Kristjan Raud
- Marie Reisik
- Eduard Rüga
- Aleksander Tassa
- Nikolai Triik
- Ado Vabbe
- Aleksander Vardi
