= Lepp =

Family name

Origin
- Language: Estonian
- Meaning: Alder
- Region of origin: Estonia

Other names
- Variant form: Alder

Lepp is a surname, very common in Estonia (meaning alder), and may refer to:

- Bil Lepp, American storyteller
- Ignace Lepp (1908–1966), Estonian-French writer and priest
- Jaan Lepp (1895–1941), Estonian veteran of War of Independence
- James Lepp (born 1983), Canadian golfer
- Kadri Lepp (born 1979), Estonian actress and children's writer
- Mart Lepp (born 1947), Estonian art collector
- Marta Lepp (1883–1940), Estonian writer
- Peeter Lepp (born 1943), Estonian politician
