= Aleksander Vardi =

Estonian painter

Aleksander Vardi (until 1940 Aleksander Bergman; 4 September 1901 Tartu – 18 June 1983 Tartu) was an Estonian painter.

In 1919, Vardi enrolled at the Pallas Art School, studying under the instruction of Konrad Mägi and Ado Vabbe, graduating in 1925. After graduation, he studied in Paris from 1925 until 1929. After returning to Estonia, he worked as a freelance artist in Tartu for several years and in 1932 began working as an artist as the decorator of the Endla Theatre in Pärnu. In 1934, he left that position to become a lecturer at the Pallas Art School. In 1947, Vardi was awarded the title of professor. From 1950 until 1957, he held a position as an artist at the Vanemuine Theatre in Tartu.

In 1925, he became a member of the Pallas art association.

== Awards ==
- Meritorious Artist of the Estonian SSR
