= Anne Canal =

Artificial lake in Tartu, Estonia

- Anne kanal (Estonian)
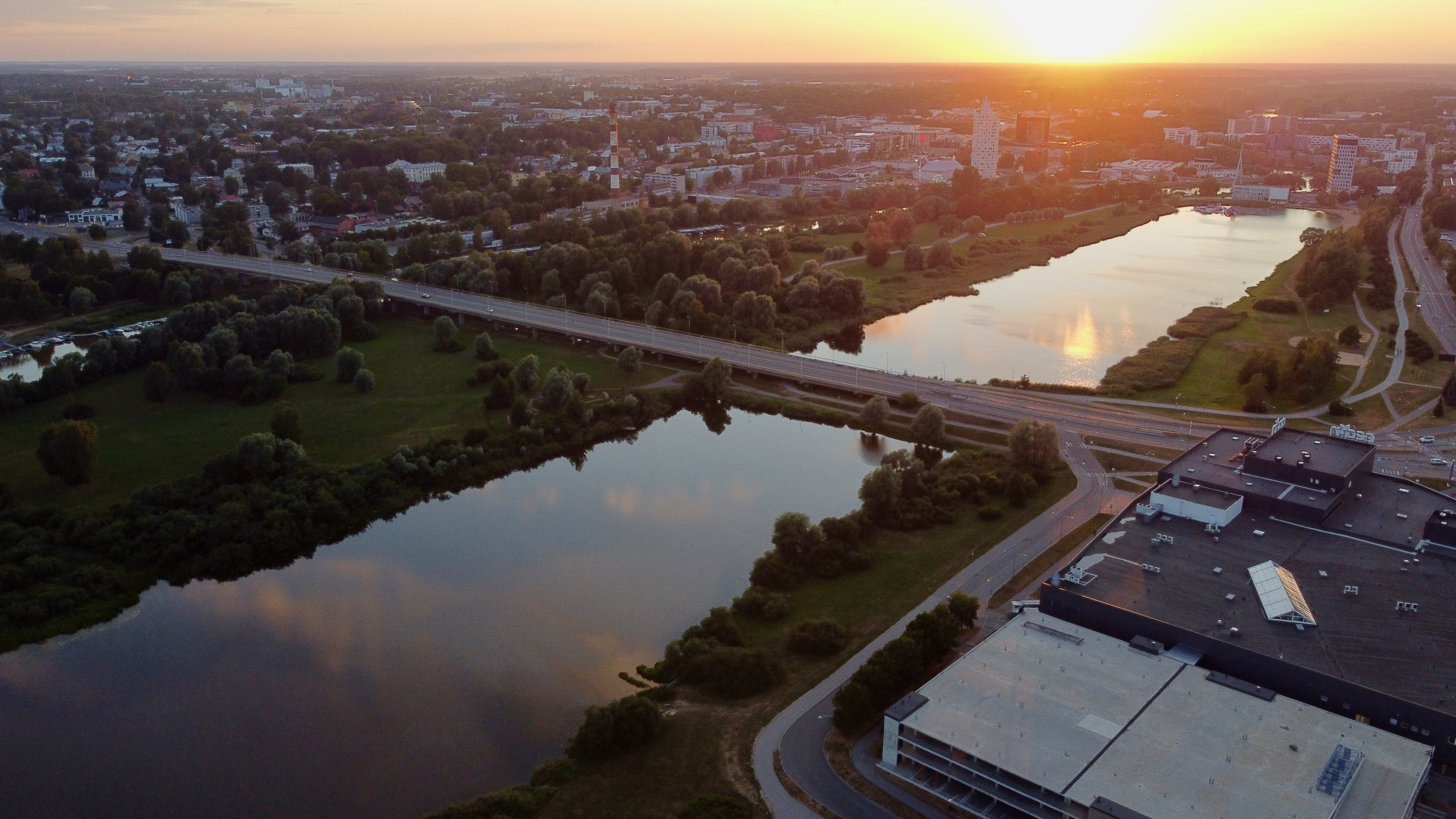

- Location within Estonia
- Location: Tartu, Estonia
- Coordinates: 58.3753°N 26.7428°E
- Basin countries: Estonia
- Max. length: 700 meters (2,300 ft)
- Surface area: 9.4 hectares (23 acres)
- Shore length^{1}: 1,650 meters (5,410 ft)
- Surface elevation: 32.0 meters (105.0 ft)
- ^{1} Shore length is not a well-defined measure.

The Anne Canal (Estonian: Anne kanal) is an artificial lake in Estonia. It is located in the city of Tartu in Tartu County.

== Physical description ==
The lake has an area of 9.4 hectares (23 acres). It is 700 meters (2,300 ft) long, and its shoreline measures 1,650 meters (5,410 ft).
