= Aleksander Tassa =

Estonian author, painter and writer

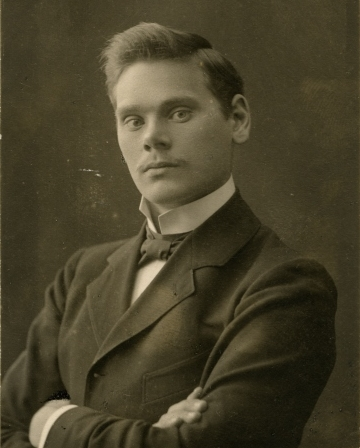
Aleksander Tassa in 1903

Aleksander Tassa (5 July 1882 Tartu – 23 March 1955 Tallinn) was an Estonian writer and art personnel.

He was one of the founder of Pallas Art School and society Pallas. 1918–1922 he was the director of society Pallas. 1931–1940 he was the director of Estonian National Museum's art and cultural history department.

He died in 1955 and he is buried at Rahumäe Cemetery.
