= Anne Nature Reserve =

Protected area in Estonia

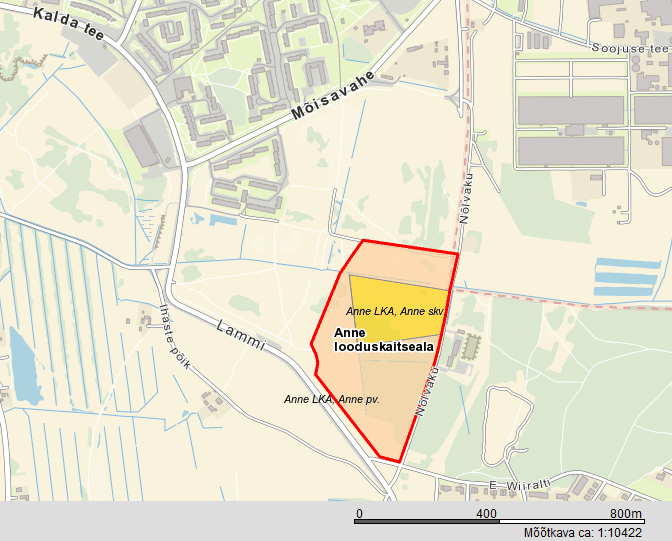
- Map of Anne Nature Reserve

- Location within Estonia
- Location: Estonia
- Nearest city: Tartu
- Coordinates: 58°21′49″N 26°46′43″E
- Area: 16 ha (40 acres)

Anne Nature Reserve is a nature reserve situated in the city of Tartu, Estonia. It is the smallest nature reserve in Estonia.
