= List of Estonian painters =

This is a list of notable painters from, or associated with, Estonia.

== A ==
- Priidu Aavik (1905–1991)
- Adamson-Eric (1902–1968)
- Ellinor Aiki (1893–1969)
- Arnold Akberg (1894–1984)
- Efraim Allsalu (1929–2006)
- Toomas Altnurme (born 1973)
- Jüri Arrak (1936–2022)

== D ==
- Eugen Dücker (1841–1916)

== G ==
- Eduard von Gebhardt (1838–1925)

== H ==
- August Matthias Hagen (1794–1878)
- Julie Wilhelmine Hagen-Schwarz (1824–1902)
- Eduard Hau (1807–1888)
- Alfred Hirv (1880–1918)
- Oskar Hoffmann (1851–1912)

== J ==
- Alisa Jakobi (born 1981)
- Andrus Johani (1906–1941)
- Aleksander Jurich (1880–1945)

== K ==
- Kalli Kalde (born 1967)
- Oskar Kallis (1892–1918)
- Elmar Kits (1913–1972)
- Liis Koger (born 1989)
- Johann Köler (1826–1899)
- Jaan Koort (1883–1935)
- Kaarel Kurismaa (born 1939)

== L ==
- Ants Laikmaa (1866–1942)
- Malle Leis (1940–2017)
- Kaarel Liimand (1906–1941)
- Karin Luts (1904–1993)

== M ==
- Konrad Mägi (1878–1925)
- Olav Maran (born 1933)
- Lydia Mei (1896–1965)
- Natalie Mei (1900–1975)
- Peeter Mudist (1942–2013)
- Juhan Muks (1899–1983)
- Aleksander Mülber (1897–1931)

== N ==
- Navitrolla (born 1970)
- Carl Timoleon von Neff (1804–1877)
- Alexander Nelke (1894–1974)
- Mall Nukke (born 1964)

== O ==
- Evald Okas (1915–2011)
- Eduard Ole (1898–1995)
- Enno Ootsing (born 1940)
- Ludvig Oskar (1874–1951)

== P ==
- Tiit Pääsuke (born 1941)
- Karl Pärsimägi (1902–1942)
- Voldemar Päts (1878–1958)
- August Georg Wilhelm Pezold (1794–1859)
- Enn Põldroos (1933–2025)
- Aleksander Promet (1879–1938)
- Aapo Pukk (born 1962)

== R ==
- Kristjan Raud (1865–1943)
- Paul Raud (1865–1930)

== S ==
- Martin Saar (born 1980)
- Richard Sagrits (1910–1968)
- Mart Sander (born 1967)
- Erik Schmidt (1925–2014)
- Karl August Senff (1770–1838)
- Michael Sittow (1469–1525)
- Ülo Sooster (1924–1970)
- Eugen Sterpu (born 1963)
- Viive Sterpu (1953–2012)
- Olev Subbi (1930–2013)

== T ==
- Aleksander Tassa (1882–1955)
- Nikolai Triik (1884–1940)
- Balder Tomasberg (1897–1919)
- Välko Tuul (1894–1918)

== U ==
- Helge Uuetoa (1936–2008)
- Aleksander Uurits (1888–1918)

== V ==
- Ado Vabbe (1892–1961)
- Kuno Veeber (1898–1929)
- Ülo Vilimaa (1941–2021)
- Toomas Vint (born 1944)
- Johannes Võerahansu (1902–1980)

== W ==
- Gottlieb Welté (c.1745–1792)
- Eduard Wiiralt (1898–1954)

== See also ==
- List of Estonians
