= Viive =

Female given name

- Gender: Female
- Language: Estonian
- Name day: 2 June

Origin
- Meaning: "delay"
- Region of origin: Estonia

Other names
- Related names: Veevi, Viiva, Viivi, Viivia, Viivika, Vivian

Viive is an Estonian feminine given name, occasionally a diminutive of Vivian or Viivika.

As of 1 January 2021, 989 women in Estonian bear the name Viive, making it the 190th most popular female name in the country. Viive is most common in the 75-79 age group, where 36.82 per 10,000 inhabitants bear the name. The name is most commonly found Põlva County, where there 18.99 per 10,000 inhabitants of the county bear the name.

Individuals bearing the name Viive include:

- Viive Aamisepp (1936–2023), actress
- Viive Ernesaks (1931–2023), pianist, concertmaster, music educator, and author
- Viive Noor (born 1955), illustrator and curator
- Viive Rosenberg (born 1943), agricultural scientist and politician
- Viive Sterpu (1953–2012), artist
