= Lists of painters =

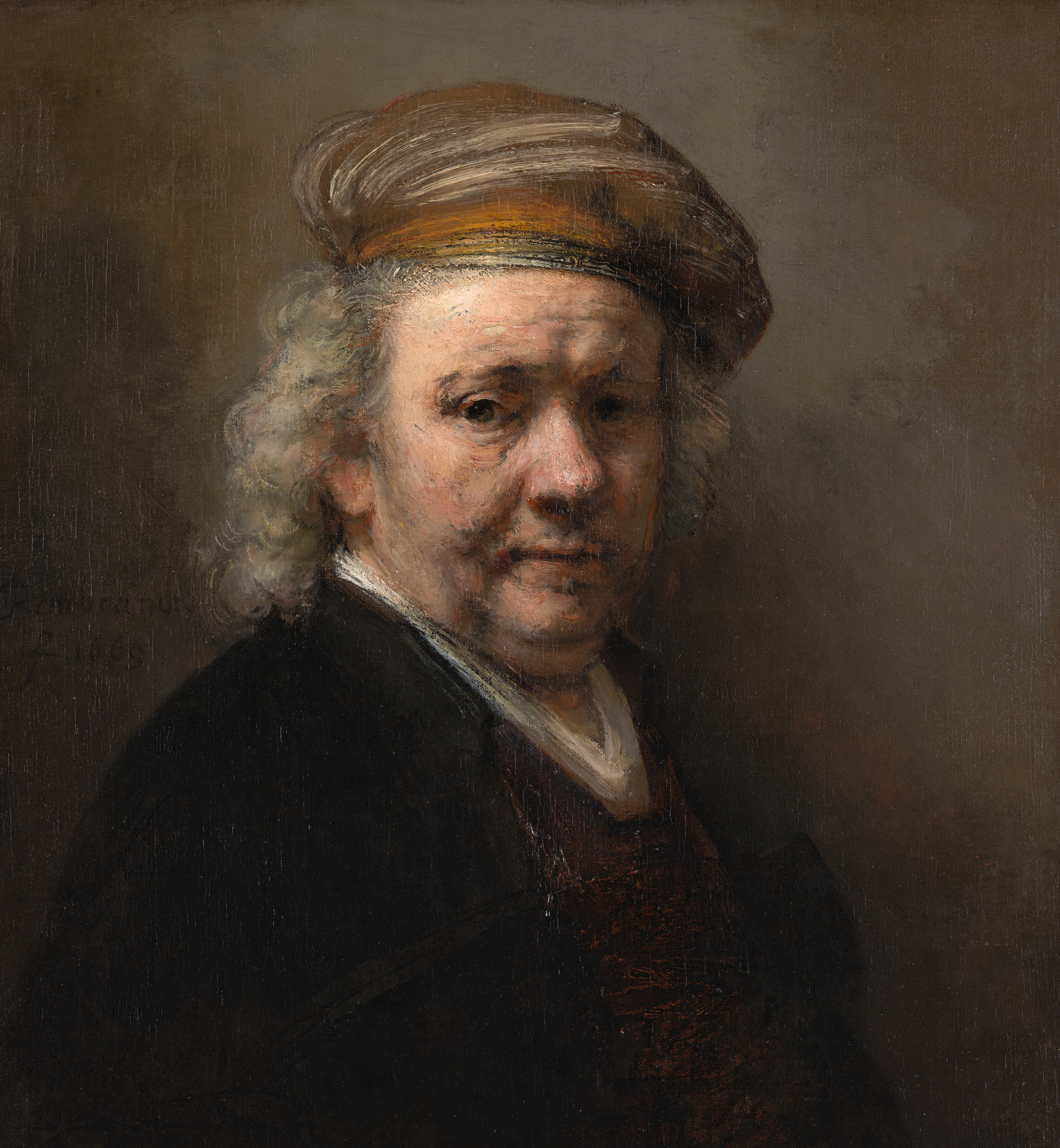
Rembrandt

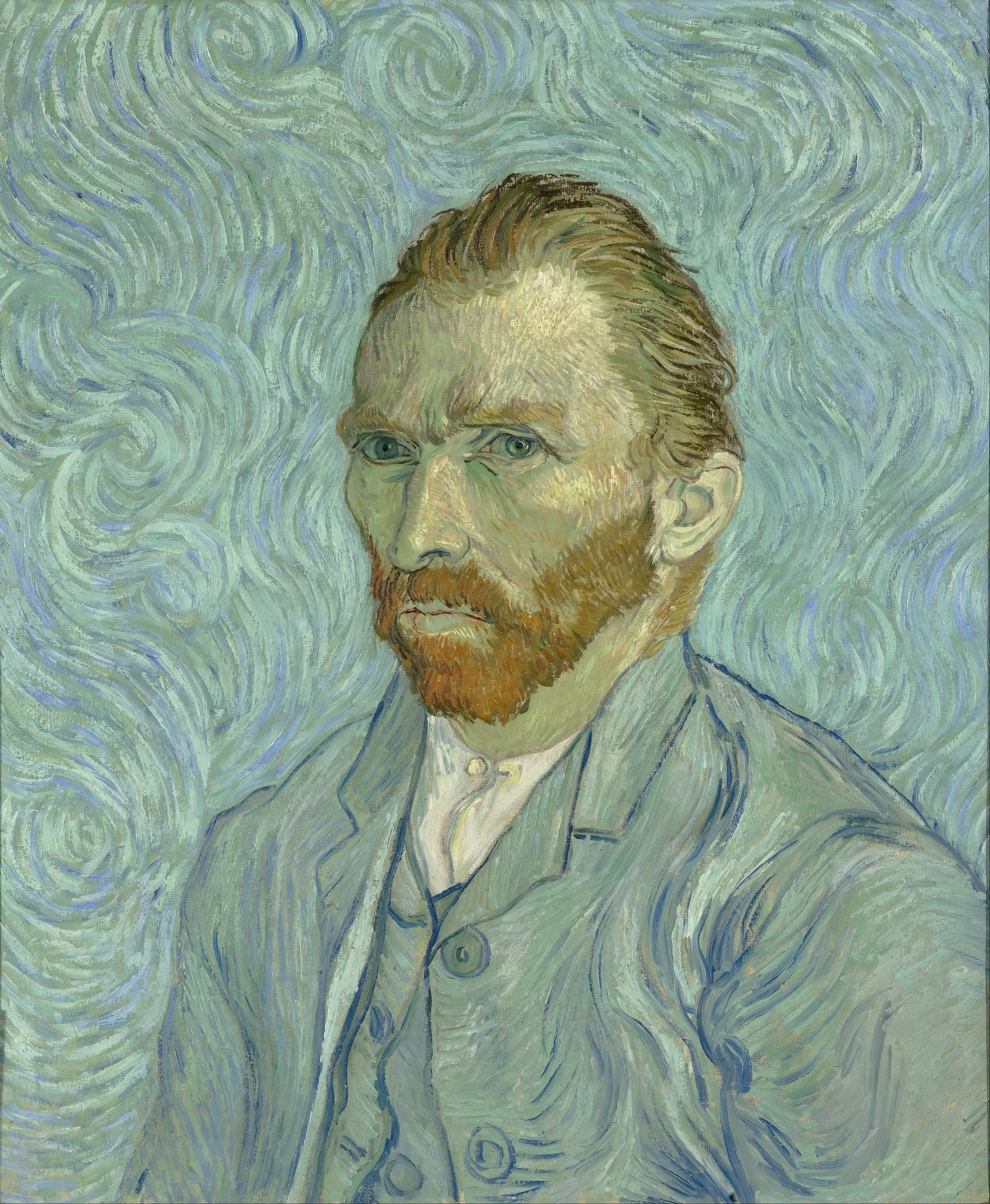
Vincent van Gogh

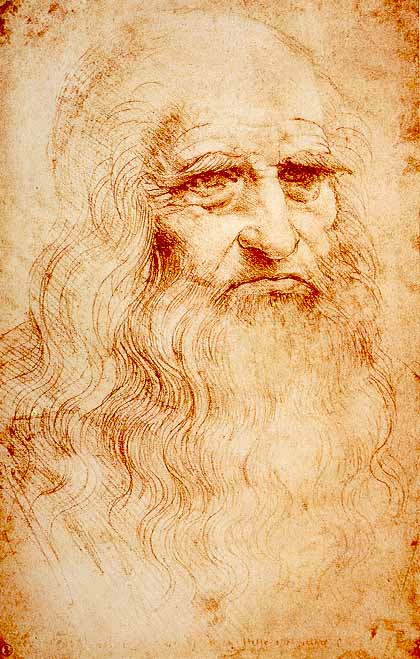
Leonardo da Vinci

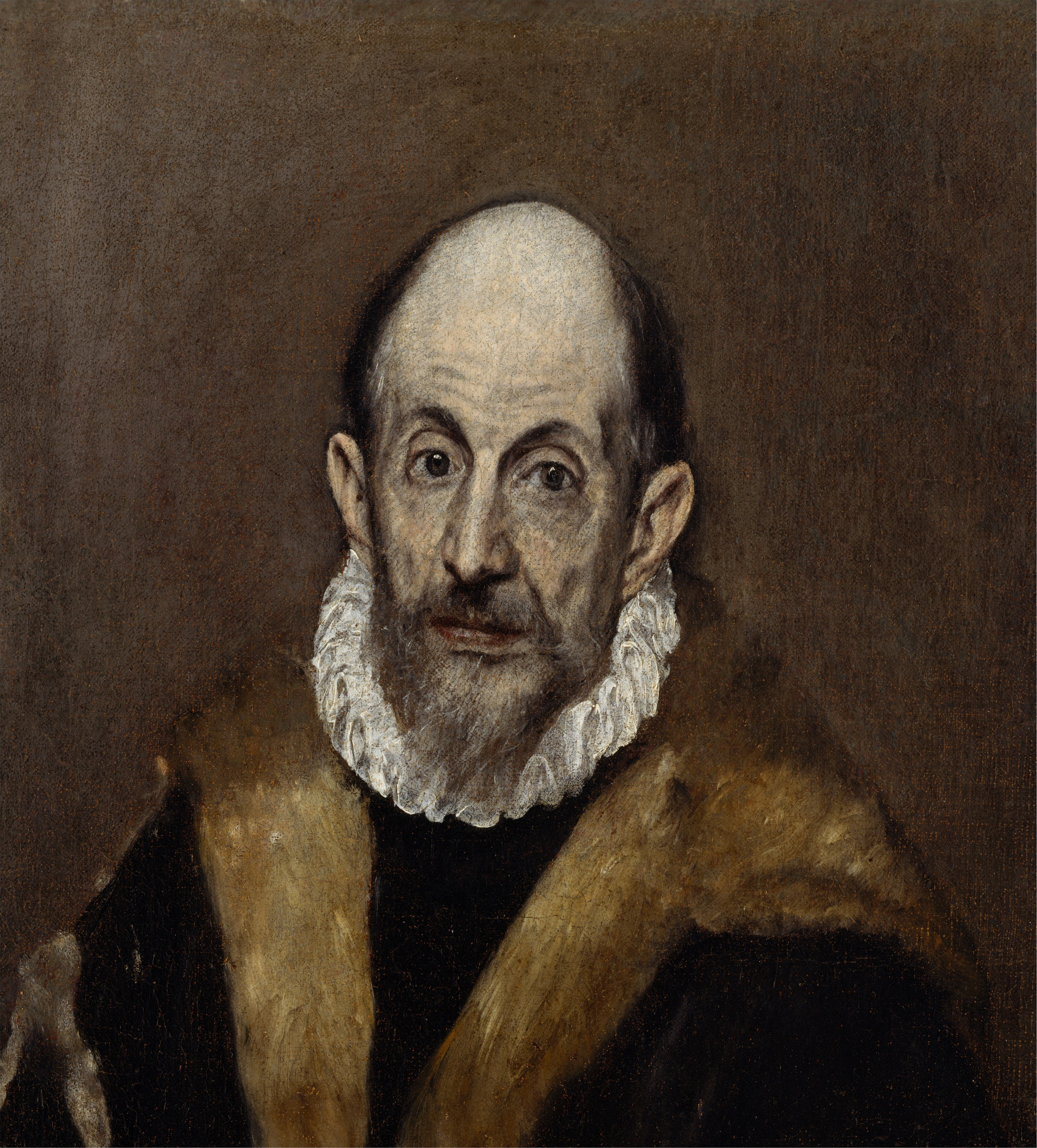
El Greco self portrait

Lists of painters cover painters and are organized by name, nationality, gender, location, school and collection.

== General ==
- List of painters by name
- Lists of painters by nationality
- Women Painters of the World, 1905 book

== By location ==
- List of African-American visual artists
- List of Early Netherlandish painters
- English female artists
- List of Greek vase painters
- List of artists who painted Hawaii and its people
- List of Maine painters
- List of Milanese painters
- List of Russian landscape painters
- List of painters and architects of Venice
- List of painters of Saint Petersburg Union of Artists

== By school ==
- List of Académie des Beaux-Arts members: Painting
- List of Nihonga painters
- List of Yōga painters
- List of Hudson River School artists
- List of Mannerist painters
- List of Carlo Maratta pupils and assistants
- Old Master
- List of Rembrandt pupils

== By collection ==
- Catalog of paintings in the Louvre Museum
- Catalogue of paintings in the National Gallery, London
- List of painters in the Art Institute of Chicago
- List of painters in the Frans Hals Museum
- List of painters in the Los Angeles County Museum of Art
- List of painters in the National Gallery of Art
- List of painters in the Pinakothek
- List of painters in the Rijksmuseum
- List of artists in the Web Gallery of Art (A–K)
- List of artists in the Web Gallery of Art (L-Z)
- Musée d'Orsay

== By nationality ==
=== Americas ===
- American painters (before 1900)
- American painters (1900–present)
- Brazilian painters
- Canadian painters
- Cuban painters
- Dominican painters
- Ecuadorian painters

=== Asia ===
- Armenian painters
- Azerbaijani painters
- Bangladeshi painters
- Chinese painters
- Filipino painters
- Georgian painters
- Indian painters
- Indonesian painters
- Iranian painters
- Israeli painters
- Japanese painters
  - Nihonga painters
- Kazakhstani painters
- Korean painters
- Lebanese painters
- Palestinian painters
- Turkish painters

=== Europe ===
- Albanian painters
- Armenian painters
- Austrian painters
- Azerbaijani painters
- Belgian painters
- Belarusian painters
- Bosnian painters
- British painters
- Bulgarian painters
- Croatian painters
- Cypriot painters
- Czech painters
- Danish painters
- Dutch painters
- Estonian painters
- Finnish painters
- Flemish painters
- French painters
- German painters
- Georgian painters
- Greek painters
- Hungarian painters
- Icelandic painters
- Irish painters
- Italian painters
- Latvian painters
- Lithuanian painters
- Luxembourgish painters
- Norwegian painters
- Polish painters
- Portuguese painters
- Romanian painters
- Russian painters
  - 19th-century Russian painters
  - 20th-century Russian painters
  - Painters of Saint Petersburg Union of Artists
  - Russian landscape painters
- Serbian painters
- Slovak painters
- Spanish painters
- Swedish painters
- Turkish painters
- Ukrainian painters

=== Other ===
- Australian painters
- Egyptian painters
