= Raul Pizarro =

Mexican artist (born 1975)

- Born: November 11, 1975 (age 50); Mexicali, Mexico
- Occupation: Visual artist
- Notable work: Greatest Acceptance (2018), Daedalus (2009)
- Website: raulpizarro.com

Raul Pizarro (born November 11, 1975) is a queer, disabled, latinx visual artist, known for his Day of the Dead series, as well as his paintings about his queerness and his disability.

== Background ==
Pizarro was born in 1975 in Mexicali, Mexico, and moved to Southern California.

Pizarro was diagnosed with muscular dystrophy, and since he was unable to continue making large canvas paintings, his paintings were smaller. In 2016, engineers from the Northrop Grumman FabLab at the Redondo Beach Space Park created a remote-controlled easel allowing him access to paint any size canvas.

That same year, Pizarro received funding for a van to support his wheelchair through the "Raul Pizarro's Wheelchair Van" GoFundMe on gofundme.com, set up by Holly Vredenburg.

== Notable art ==
Pizarro's paintings focus on the artists' intersectional identities as a disabled, queer, Latinx person raised evangelical. His visual work explores relationship between religion, disability and queerness.

In 2012, Pizarro worked with Self Help Graphics to create Sharia, a limited-edition serigraph inspired by works of art pertaining to Islamic Law.

In 2014, Pizarro was the subject of the Emmy Award–nominated documentary Raul Pizarro: Fuerza Incansable, produced by Univision.

Pizarro's Songs for a Deaf God series is a collection of oil-on-canvas paintings focused on identity and the intersection of gender identity, mental illness, and disability, namely in a religious context.

Pizarro's Feral Allegories series, a collection of oil paintings, were inspired for Pizarro's relationship with his nephew. The paintings helped him develop a special connection to his nephew, communicating through images of bears and pandas.

In 2022, Pizarro worked on the Tiangius Project, creating a series centered around the experience of immigrants.

== See also ==
- List of American artists
- List of Mexican artists
- List of painters
- List of people from California
