= Adam Emory Albright =

American painter

- Born: August 15, 1862; Monroe, Wisconsin, U.S.
- Died: September 13, 1957 (aged 95); Warrenville, Illinois, U.S.
- Known for: Painting, Landscape art
- Spouse: Clara Wilson
- Children: 3, including Ivan

Adam Emory Albright (August 15, 1862 – September 13, 1957) was a painter of figures in landscapes. He was born in Monroe, Wisconsin and spent his working life in Warrenville and the Chicago area.

== Early years ==
Albright studied at the Chicago Academy of Fine Arts (later the Art Institute of Chicago) and under Thomas Eakins, but also in Europe during the nineteenth century. Albright began as a landscape painter but moved to strongly foregrounding individuals in most of his paintings. A particular interest for his paintings was children. He painted in oils, using almost pastel tones and visible brush-strokes, creating realistic paintings that approached Impressionism in style. Themes portrayed by the man called the James Whitcomb Riley of the brush include country children at quiet play, at rest, and walking. Many country scenes were from the town of Warrenville and then-rural areas of what is now Chicago.

In the early part of the twentieth century, Albright was an established Chicago-area artist, commanding $1,500 for a canvas and often serving on the jury for the annual Chicago and vicinity exhibition at the Chicago Art Institute.

== Later life ==
Albright later married Clara Wilson Albright, and they had three sons, including twins Malvin, who became a sculptor, and Ivan, who became the most prominent Chicago artist of the time. Ivan was commissioned by MGM to create the portrait from the film, The Picture of Dorian Gray. Malvin also submitted a painting that was not used for the film.

In 1924, Albright acquired a vacant church building on Second Street in Warrenville. He and his two sons operated the Albright Gallery of Painting and Sculpture. In 1981, the building was acquired by the city and after extensive renovations, it was converted into the Albright Studio museum by the Warrenville Historical Society.

As an elderly man, Albright decided to sell his paintings on monthly installments to be paid as long as he lived, so that he would have an insured retirement income. Many people thought they would get his paintings at a very low price since he was already an old man, but his longevity served him well. He died at age 95 at his home in Warrenville.

== Bibliography ==
- My Land. My Country. My Home. Albany, N.Y. C. F. Williams & son, 1915.
- For Art’s Sake. Warrenville, Ill. Priv. printed, 1953.
- Albright Studio museum. Warrenville, Illinois. Retrieved 3/13/2012
