= List of Belarusian painters =

This is a list of Belarusian painters.

- Meer Akselrod
- Peter Blume
- Vitold Byalynitsky-Birulya
- Marc Chagall
- Jonas Damelis
- Mai Dantsig
- Anatoli Lvovich Kaplan
- Michel Kikoine
- Irina Kotova
- Pinchus Kremegne
- Dmitry Kustanovich
- Yehuda Pen
- Alexandr Rodin
- Alfred Isidore Romer
- Mikhail Savicki
- William S. Schwartz
- Yauhen Shatokhin
- Nikodim Silivanovich
- Joseph Solman
- Chaïm Soutine
- Sergey Zaryanko
