= List of painters by name =

The following lists of painters by name includes about 3,400 painters from all ages and parts of the world.

== See also ==
- Lists of painters
- Lists of painters by nationality
- List of modern artists
- List of contemporary artists
- List of 20th-century women artists
- List of 21st-century women artists
- List of sculptors
- List of architects
- List of graphic designers
- List of illustrators
