= List of painters from Kazakhstan =

This is a list of notable painters from, or associated with, Kazakhstan.

== B ==
- Dilka Bear (born 1977)

== D ==
- Agimsaly Duzelkhanov (born 1951)

== G ==
- Aisha Galimbaeva (1917-2008)

== K ==
- Sergey Kalmykov (1891-1967)
- Abilkhan Kasteev (1904-1973)
