= Eugen Sterpu =

Estonian-Moldovan painter

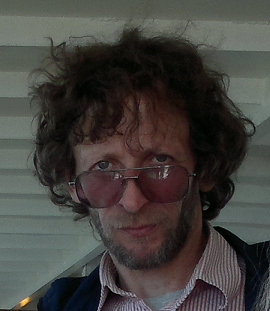
- Eugen Sterpu, Estonian painter and sculptor
- Born: 10 June 1963; Dămăşcani, Moldavian SSR
- Known for: Painting, Sculpture

Eugen Sterpu (nickname Gicu; born June 10, 1963, is a Moldovan painter, as was his Estonian wife Viive Sterpu. Sterpu lives and works in Tallinn, Estonia.

== Education ==
Sterpu studied in Arts High School Moldavia from 1975 to 1981 and in State Art Institute of the Estonian SSR from 1981 to 1989. The latter was renamed Eesti Kunstiakadeemia (Estonian Academy of Arts) in 1989. In Estonia he specialized in sculpture. From 1994 to 1995 Sterpu taught at the Moldovan Arts High School in Chişinău.

== Exhibitions ==
Sterpu has had individual and joint exhibitions in Moldova, Romania, Denmark, Estonia, Finland, Sweden and Russia. In April 2012 he held a joint art exhibition with his wife in Turku, Finland.

== Technique ==
Sterpu invented a way of working with pastel colors. He draws on sandpaper and uses linseed oil. The resulting colours are clear and strong. The right coloured passe-partout helps bring out the pure tones and contrast of the colours. Education in sculpture deepened his knowledge about architecture, which is his favourite subject in his works. Most of his works are three-dimensional because of his technique.

In 2004 Estonian Television made a documentary Viive and Eugen Sterpu for the programme series Subjektiiv. Viive Sterpu died in 2012.

== Memberships ==
Viive Sterpu is a member of the Estonian Artists' Association.
