= William S. Schwartz =

Belarusian-born American artist

William Samuel Schwartz (February 23, 1896 – February 10, 1977) was an American artist who lived and worked in Chicago.

== Biography ==
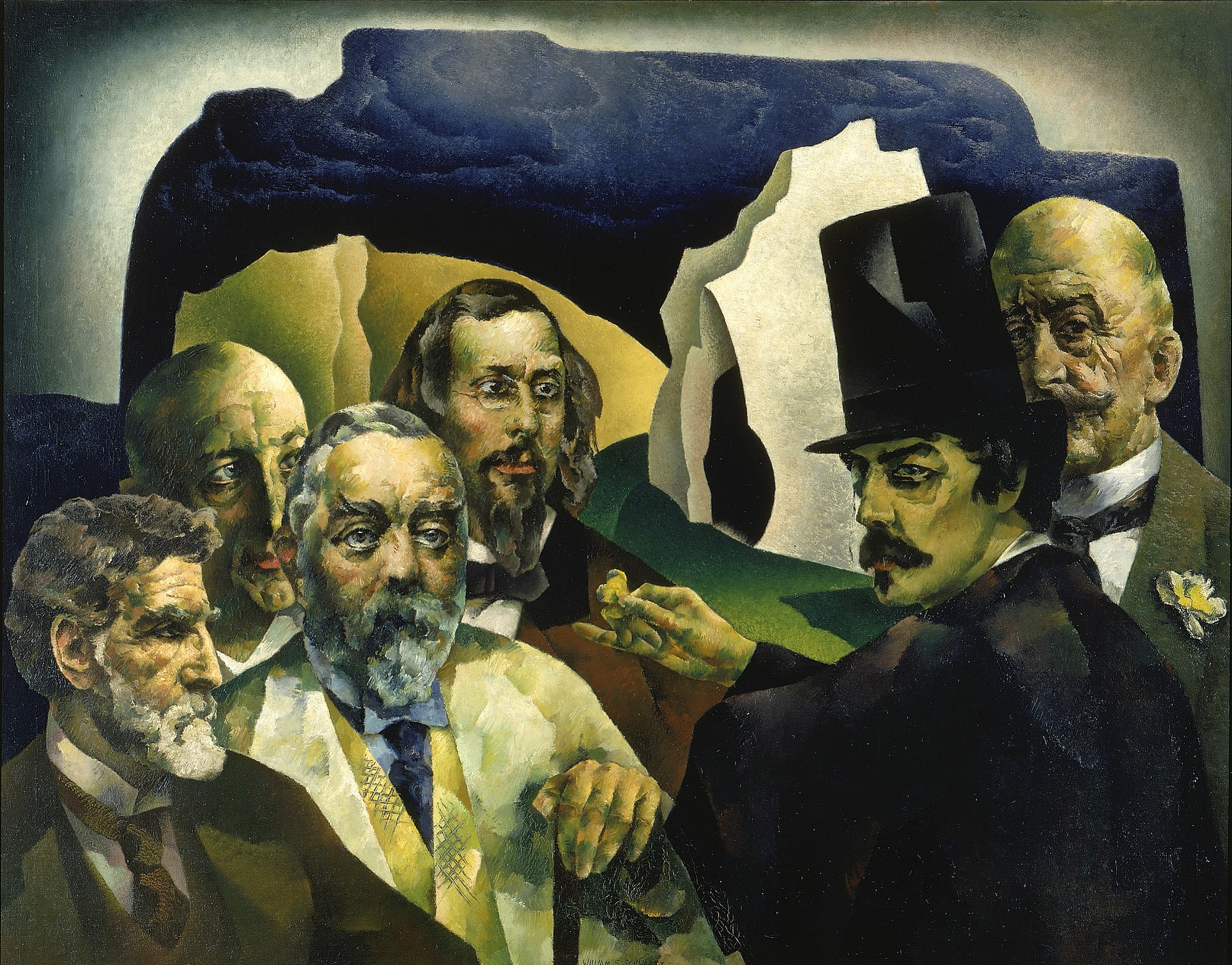
Americana (No. 2), a 1934 painting by Schwartz for the Public Works of Art Project

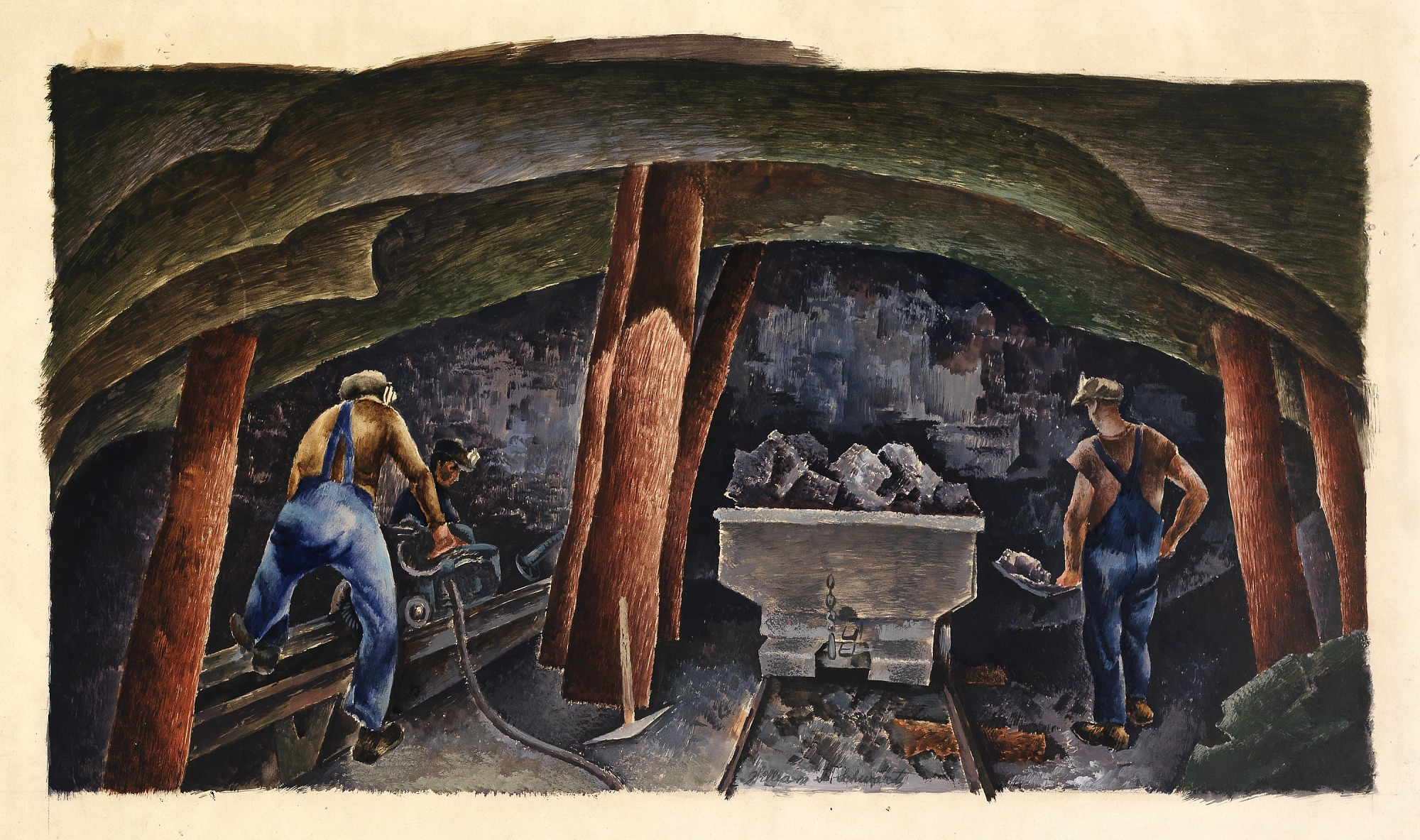
Study for Mining in Illinois (1937), Schwartz's mural for the post office in Eldorado, Illinois

Schwartz was born in Smorgon in Belarus (then in the Russian Empire) to Samuel Schwartz and Tauba Reznikoff. At the age of thirteen, he moved to the nearby city of Vilna to attend art school. Four years later, he emigrated to the United States and eventually enrolled in the School of the Art Institute of Chicago. After graduating, he put his art career on hold to concentrate on a budding career as an opera singer. When Schwartz returned to painting, he distinguished himself with dreamy, symbolist works and abstractions that tended to bewilder viewers. He also scandalized conservative audiences with numerous lithographs of nude women. During the Great Depression, Schwartz became an artist on the Federal Art Project payroll. Working under the supervision of Increase Robinson in Chicago, he painted Regionalist works showing the countryside and small-town American life. It was not until the early 1940s that Schwartz returned to painting the esoteric imagery for which he had become known. Greatly influenced by European surrealism, Schwartz painted strange biomorphic forms and apocalyptic scenes in many of his works.

He became a well-known figure in Chicago, mostly due to his memorable handlebar mustache and eccentric persona. He was also one of a group of prominent Chicago artists—including Ivan Albright, Malvin Albright, and Aaron Bohrod—that hung out at Riccardo's Restaurant and Gallery during the 1940s and 1950s. In his final years, Schwartz returned exclusively to painting abstracts; these paintings are considered among his best work. Schwartz began suffering from Alzheimer's disease around 1970 and died in Chicago on February 10, 1977.

The Art Institute of Chicago and the Joslyn Art Museum in Omaha have several of Schwartz's works in their permanent collections.
