= Olav Maran =

Estonian artist

Olav Maran (born 20 October 1933 in Tartu) is an Estonian artist.

== Life ==
Maran was a second child of Elfriide Maran, who later become a sculptor, and a police constable Alfred Maran. In the year 1938 Elfriide Maran moved to Tallinn with her two children, there Olav Maran started a Secondary School at Tallinna 10. keskkool, where he graduated from in 1953. After that he began his studies at the Estonian Academy of Arts of the Estonian Soviet Socialist Republic. Maran studied together with Peeter Ulas, Herald Eelma, Heldur Laretei and Silvia Liiberg, who later become his wife. In 1959 Maran received a master's degree in graphic arts. From 1959 to 1965, he worked as designer and caricaturist for the journal Pikker.

His mother was the sculptor Elfriide Maran, and his wife the graphic artist Silvia Liiberg.

== Career ==
Maran started to participate in exhibitions in year 1959. He has mainly done paintings, and very few graphic works e.g. a ply wood cut („The Street“, 1960).(3) In the beginning of his career Maran was very interested in modern art movements. He executed his first abstract paintings between 1957–59, the first surrealistic work „Prospect“ was painted in 1959. He was then inspired by Herbert Read’s book „Modern Art“, that had been published before World War II and an article by Ilmar Laaban in the journal „Estonian Youth“. He received some information about western culture also through the art magazines of socialist countries. In the 1960s Maran experimented with different modern styles, wanting to introduce the experiences of modern art into Estonian art. His main medium was oil painting, but he also used gouache, tempera, pastel and collage. Being one of the leading avant-garde artist, Maran gave lectures and published articles about modern art.

At that time, Maran exhibited in public exhibitions mainly with simplified-form townscapes and still life paintings. His motifs have been taken from the less representative areas, especially these from the beginning of 1960s, when he lived close to Paper Mill and painted the factory itself and the surrounding neighborhood. These “Severe Style” paintings express the characteristics of that time period: the gloominess and bleakness, propensity to avoid capturing the beautiful and idyllic (“Autumn Sun” 1961, “Winter Townscape” 1962). From the time Olav Maran lived in Lilleküla, he executed „Moon over Roofs “ 1966, „Over the Fence 1970“. Maran continued painting townscapes also in the later periods of his artistic career, as an example: „Winter Suburb Motif “ 1981, „Dull Winter Day“

In his portraits, artist concentrates mainly on form and colour, not as much on the psychology of man.

In 1968, Olav Maran experienced a religious turn, that changed his understanding of the world and artistic values. From that period he has mainly depicted realistic landscapes, flowers - amaryllises, lilies, peonies and still lifes in the style of old old masters. In these paintings he shows his regard towards the nature and ordinary objects, giving them inner harmony and deeper-ethical meaning. Olav Maran’s masterful painting technique makes the objects seem real in everyday environment. In his few portraits, "Graphic Artist Sylvia Liiberg" 1981, is probably the most notable. In his ascetic nature paintings, artist is realizing his philosophical aspiration to show the great through small and complexed through ordinary. These simple compositions convey the overall notion of truth. These simple compositions convey the overall notion of truth.
