= Dilka Bear =

Kazakh artist (born 1977)

Dilyara Nassyrova
- Born: 1977 (age 48–49); Almaty, Kazakhstan
- Other names: Dilka Bear
- Occupations: Artist, painter, illustrator, comics

Dilyara Nassyrova, better known as Dilka Bear (born 1977 in Almaty, Kazakhstan), is a Kazakh artist, illustrator and painter.

== Biography ==
Dilka Bear studied Architecture at the Almaty University of Arts, in Kazakhstan. After working as an illustrator and graphic designer for companies such as Cosmopolitan Kazakhstan, Grey Central Asia, Saatchi & Saatchi Kazakhstan, she focused on painting. In 2005 she moved to Trieste, where she currently lives.

Her work has been shown in galleries in Rome, Amsterdam, Los Angeles, and Melbourne.

== Influences and style ==
Dilka Bear has been influenced by artists such as Bruegel and Bosch, the Italian Renaissance, and contemporary artists including Marion Peck and Ray Caesar, as well as by Grimms' Fairy Tales. She mainly paints with acrylics on table and “creates beautiful […] illustrations of young girls and their expressions that mirror the worlds around them”.

Her “dreamy” works – to use her own words – are often categorized as belonging to the Pop surrealism visual art movement.

== Exhibitions ==
=== Group exhibitions ===
- 1997 “Butterflies”, Tribuna Art Gallery, Almaty, Kazakhstan
- 1998 “Break 21”, International Festival of Young Artists, Ljubljana, Slovenia
- 1999 “Break 21”, International Festival of Young Artists, Ljubljana, Slovenia
- 1999 “The Line of Beauty”, Art Manege ’99 - Moscow, Russia
- 2000 “Africa”, Soros Centre of Contemporary Art, Almaty, Kazakhstan
- 2001 The Cover of Daily Routine - Stuttgarter Kunstverein, Stuttgart, Germany
- 2009 “Kokeshi: from Folk to Art Toy”, Japanese American National Museum, Los Angeles, United States
- 2011 “Italian Pop Surrealism”, Mondo Bizzarro, Rome
- 2012 “Run Away Circus”, Auguste Clown Gallery, Melbourne, Australia
- 2012 “Vanishing Point”, Auguste Clown Gallery, Melbourne, Australia
- 2013 “Draw”, Auguste Clown Gallery, Melbourne, Australia
- 2013 “Blue Hour”, Auguste Clown Gallery, Melbourne, Australia
- 2013 “Into the Wild”, Strychnin Gallery, Berlin, Germany
- 2013 “All Stars”, 10 Years Anniversary Exhibition, Strychnin Gallery, Berlin, Germany
- 2013 “Kingdom of Broken Dreams: Dilka Bear & Paolo Petrangeli”, Flower Pepper Gallery, Pasadena, USA

=== Solo exhibitions ===
- 2012 “Wild Escape”, Mondo Bizzarro, Rome
- 2013 “Sleepwalker’s Dreams”, Auguste Clown Gallery, Melbourne, Australia
- 2014 “Forgotten Memories”, Auguste Clown Gallery, Melbourne, Australia

== Bibliography ==
- vv.aa., Italian Pop Surrealism, Rome: Mondo Bizzarro, 2012
- Dilka Bear, Modena: Logos edizioni, 2013
- Dilka Bear, Su Anasi, Logos edizioni, 2015
