= Viive Noor =

Estonian illustrator and curator (born 1955)

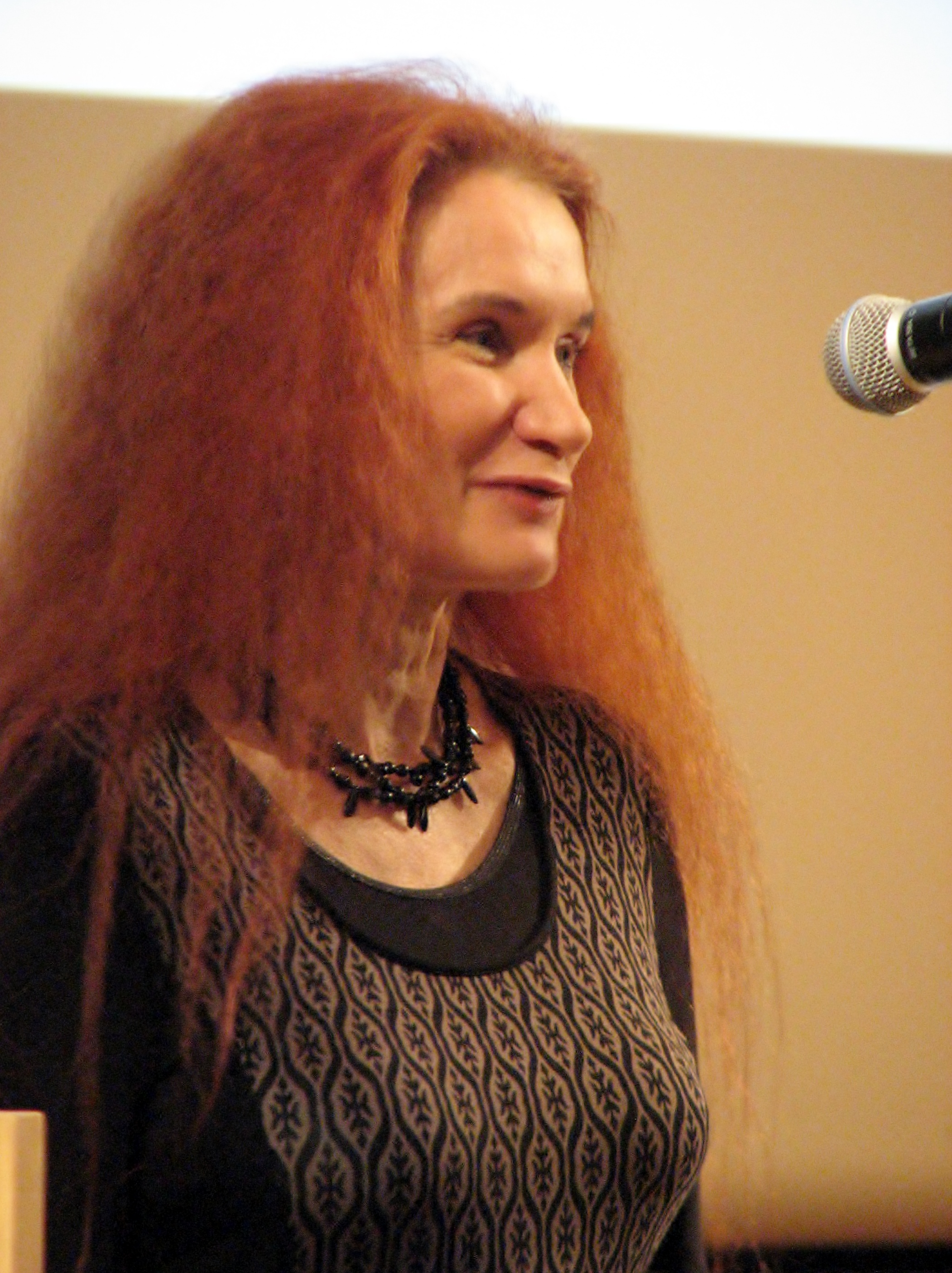
Viive Noor in 2010

Viive Noor (born 7 October 1955) is an Estonian illustrator and curator.

In 1981, she graduated from State Art Institute of the Estonian SSR in fashion design and graphic art.

She is the founder and organizer of Tallinn Illustrations Triennial "The Power of Pictures" (2003, 2006, 2009, 2013, 2017).

She is working as a curator at the Estonian Children's Literature Centre.

She is a member of several organizations, including Estonian Artists' Association, Estonian Graphic Designers' Association.
