= Aleksander Jurich =

Estonian photographer and painter

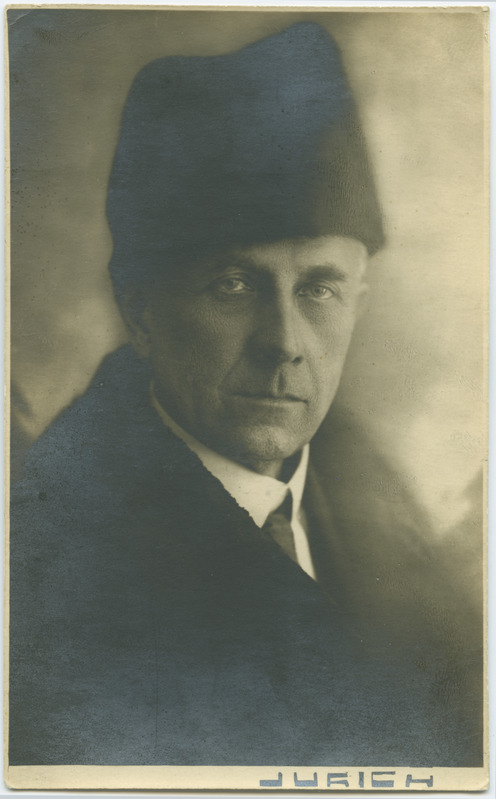
Aleksander Jurich, 1924

Aleksander August Jurich was an Estonian photographer and artist.

His work was exhibited in Tallinn in 1927.
