= Toomas Altnurme =

Estonian artist sculptor

Toomas Altnurme (born 21 January 1973) is an Estonian sculptor painter. He is known for his large-scale, abstract sculptures that often incorporate elements of nature and the environment. His work is characterized by a sense of movement and fluidity, as well as a strong connection to the natural world. Altnurme's work often incorporates natural materials such as stone and wood. He has also created sculptures that incorporate elements of light and sound, to create an immersive and interactive experience for viewers. His sculptures can be found in various locations across Estonia, such as parks, squares, and in front of buildings.

In addition to his sculptures, Altnurme has also created a number of smaller works, such as drawings, prints, and sculptures in various sizes. He has also held numerous solo and group exhibitions in Estonia and other countries.

== Biography ==
In 1991–1996, he graduated from Tallinn University, and studied painting at the Rajamangala University of Technology, and sculpture in 1999–2001, at the University of Seoul did finish Masters of Fine Arts in Hongik University Graduate School. He has appeared in exhibitions in Europe, Asia, South America and the USA.

He is a member of the Estonian Sculptors Union, Painter Union. He has worked in every area of painting installations, sculpture and mixed media, digital art. Did participate in 50 sculpture symposiums around the world and has sculptures in public spaces and parks in USA Sumter South Carolina, Brazil Brusque, Chille Carretas Park, Russia Penza, Taiwan Shimen, Denmark Hojer, England Exmoor park, France Hautecour, Italy Temu, Germany Bavaria, Finland Pello, Latvia Bikeser, Lithuania Panevezys. He is a member of Estonian Artist Association, AIESM, the Brooklyn Art Project.

He created a Ning network "Peace, Love, No War". Member of: Estonian Artist's Association Estonian Painters Association Estonian Sculptors Union Seoul A-Link Artist Group South Korea International Association for Monumental Sculpture Events Artists in Nature International Network Freelance artist, sculptor, photographer, designer. ART. Languages: Estonian. Finnish. English. Korean. Russian. Spanish Education: 1999–2001 Korean Government Scholarship. Hongik University Graduate School, Faculty of Fine Arts; Painting. Hongik University Scholarship. South Korea, Seoul – Graduated with M.F.A. 08/2001 1998–1999 Korean Government Scholarship. Seoul National University, Faculty of Fine Arts; Seoul, South Korea. Research; Sculpture, mixed media, installation. 1997 Korean Government Scholarship. Kyonghee University. Faculty of Languages; Korean language. 1991–1997 Tallinn Pedagogical University, Faculty of Fine Arts; Tallinn, Estonia. – Graduated with B.F.A. 06/1997 1994–1995 UNESCO Scholarship. Rajamangala University, Faculty of Fine arts; Bangkok, Thailand. – Painting; Faculty of Fine Arts. – Cultural exchange and international relations. 1996 Cultural Exchange Program: "Up with People"; USA. – Organized drama workshops and performances. Since 2014 he is teaching fine art and design in the United Arab Emirates University, Al Ain, UAE.
