= Viive Sterpu =

Estonian painter

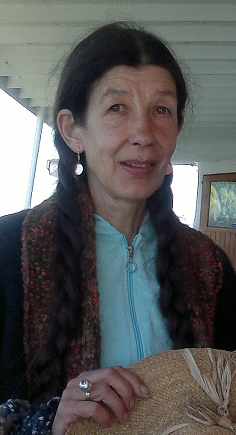
- Viive Sterpu, Estonian painter
- Born: 10 December 1953; Tallinn, then part of Estonian SSR, Soviet Union
- Died: 5 December 2012 (aged 58)
- Known for: Painting

Viive Sterpu (née Sirkel, December 10, 1953 – December 5, 2012) was an Estonian artist married to fellow artist Eugen Sterpu.

== Biography ==
Sterpu drew mostly with pastel colours on sandpaper. She also experimented with graphic art and glass works. Sterpu found her motifs mostly from everyday life. She loved animals and nature and portrayed them in her art. Sterpu signed her art with the name '"Viive"'. Before her marriage she used name "Sirkel" as a signature. In 2004 Eesti Televisioon made a documentary Viive and Eugen Sterpu for the programme series “Subjektiiv”. Sterpu was a member of Estonian Artists' Association.

Sterpu had individual and joint exhibitions in Estonia, Finland and Italy. In April 2012 she had a joint art exhibition with his husband in Turku, Finland. Giacomo Puccini's music gave her the inspiration to draw a series of 12 pictures called "The Puccinian Heroines". She donated this series of 14 heroines (Anna, Tigrana, Manon, Mimi/Musetta, Tosca, Cio-Cio-San, Minnie, Magda, Giorgetta, Suor Angeliga, Lauretta, Liú/Turandot) to the Villa Museo Giacomo Puccini (Torre del Lago Puccini in Italy) in April 2007. The donation was received by Signora Simonetta Puccini, Giacomo Puccini's granddaughter. The subjects of the Puccinian heroines has been used by travel agency Kaleva Travel in Finland for its own year stamps. By 2012 nine stamps had been published and there were to come.
