= Tartu =

Second most populous city in Estonia

- City
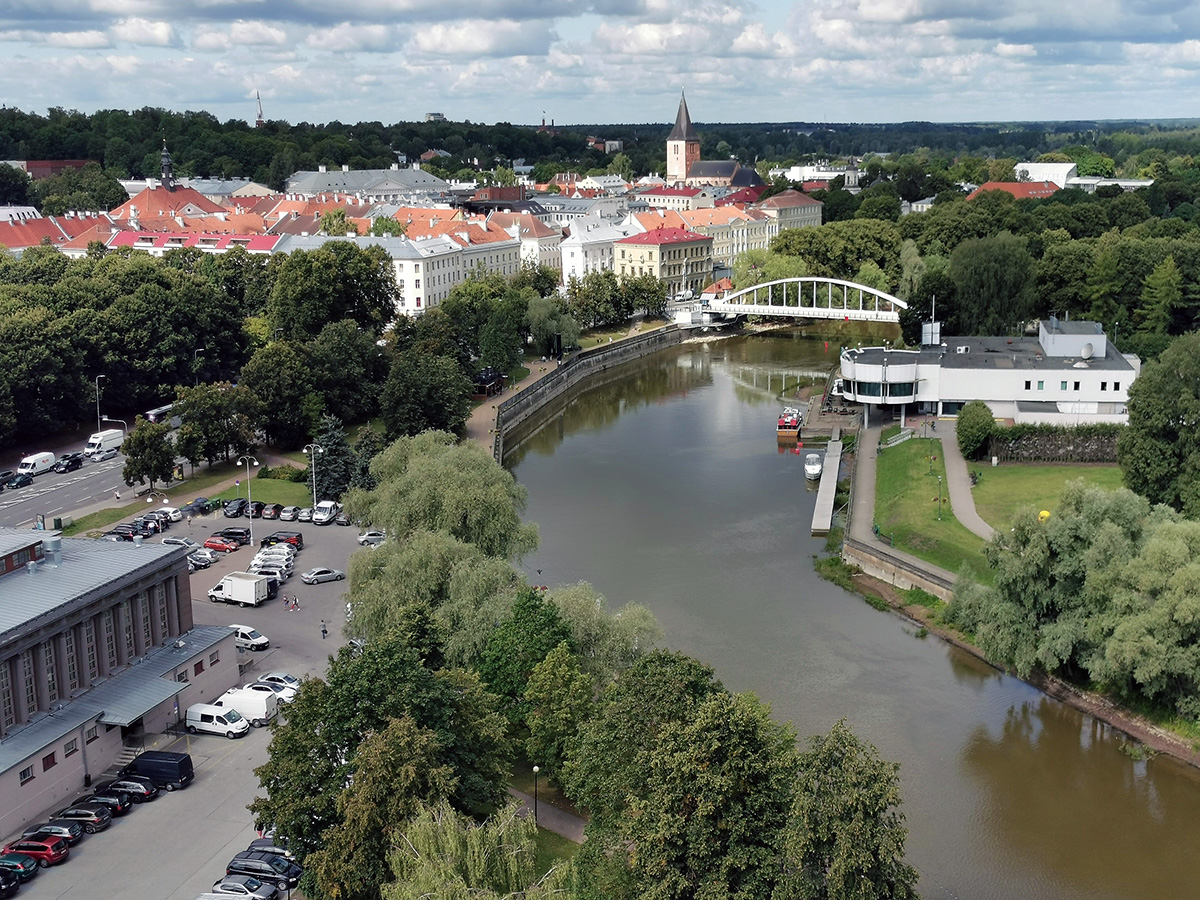
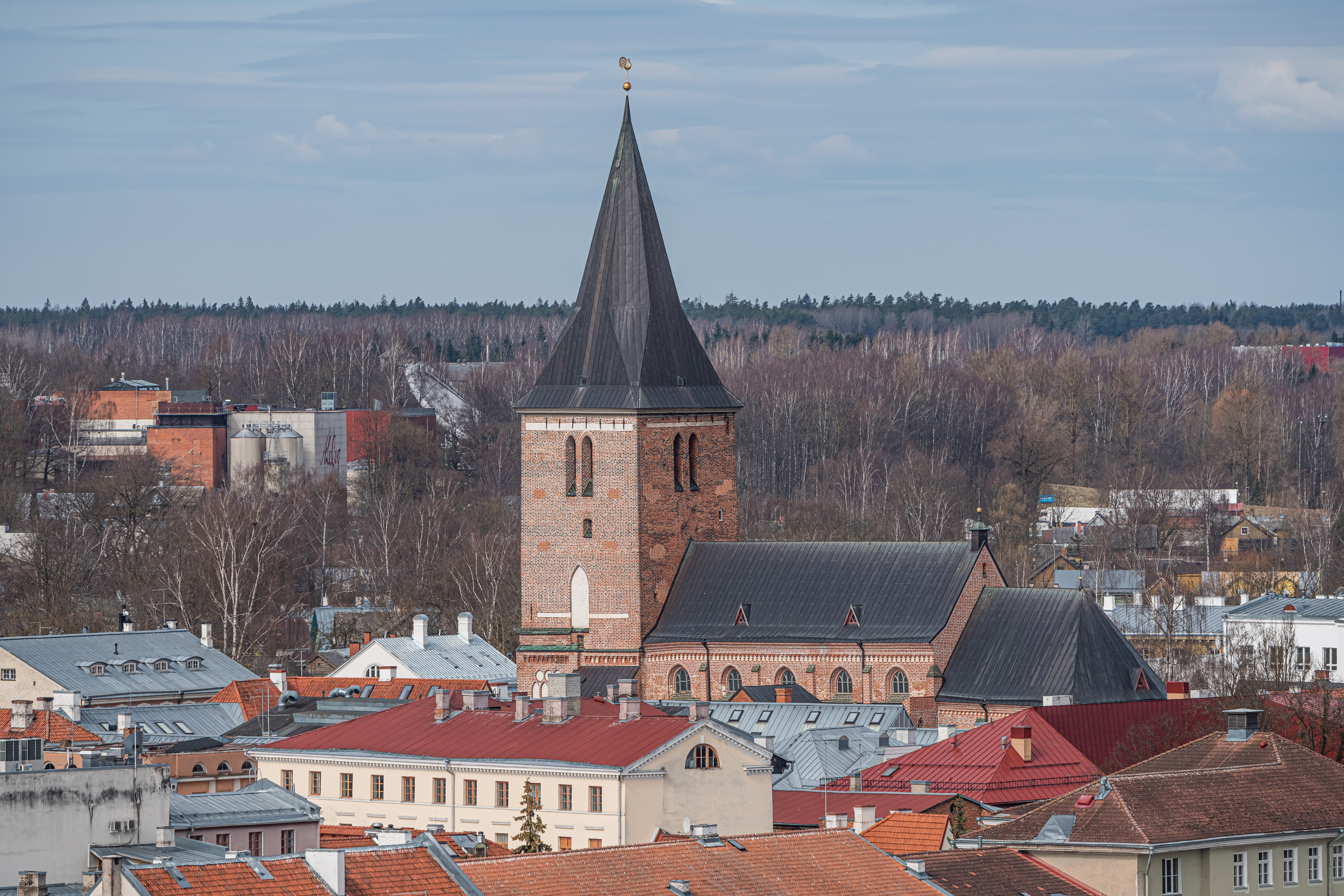
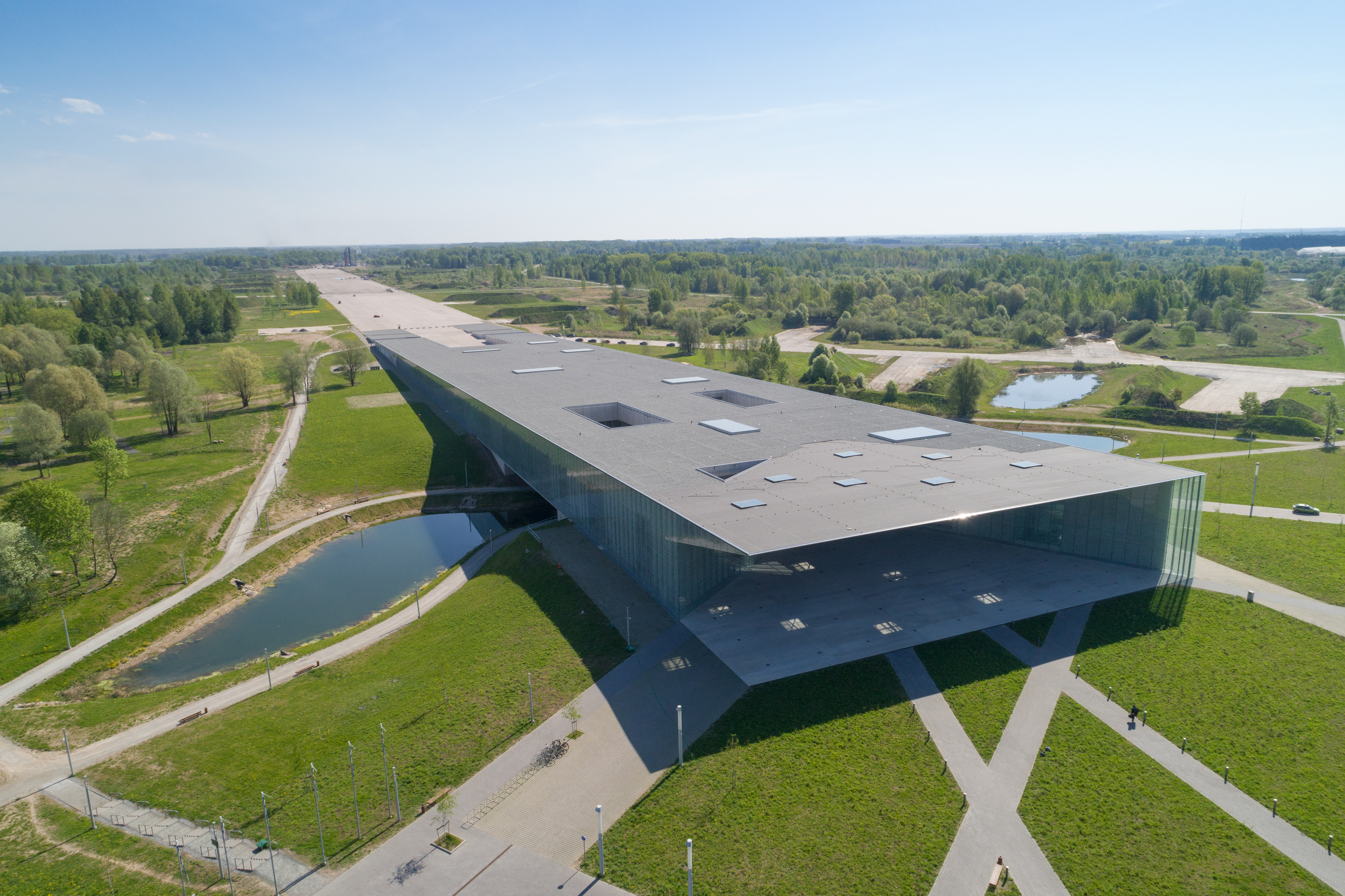
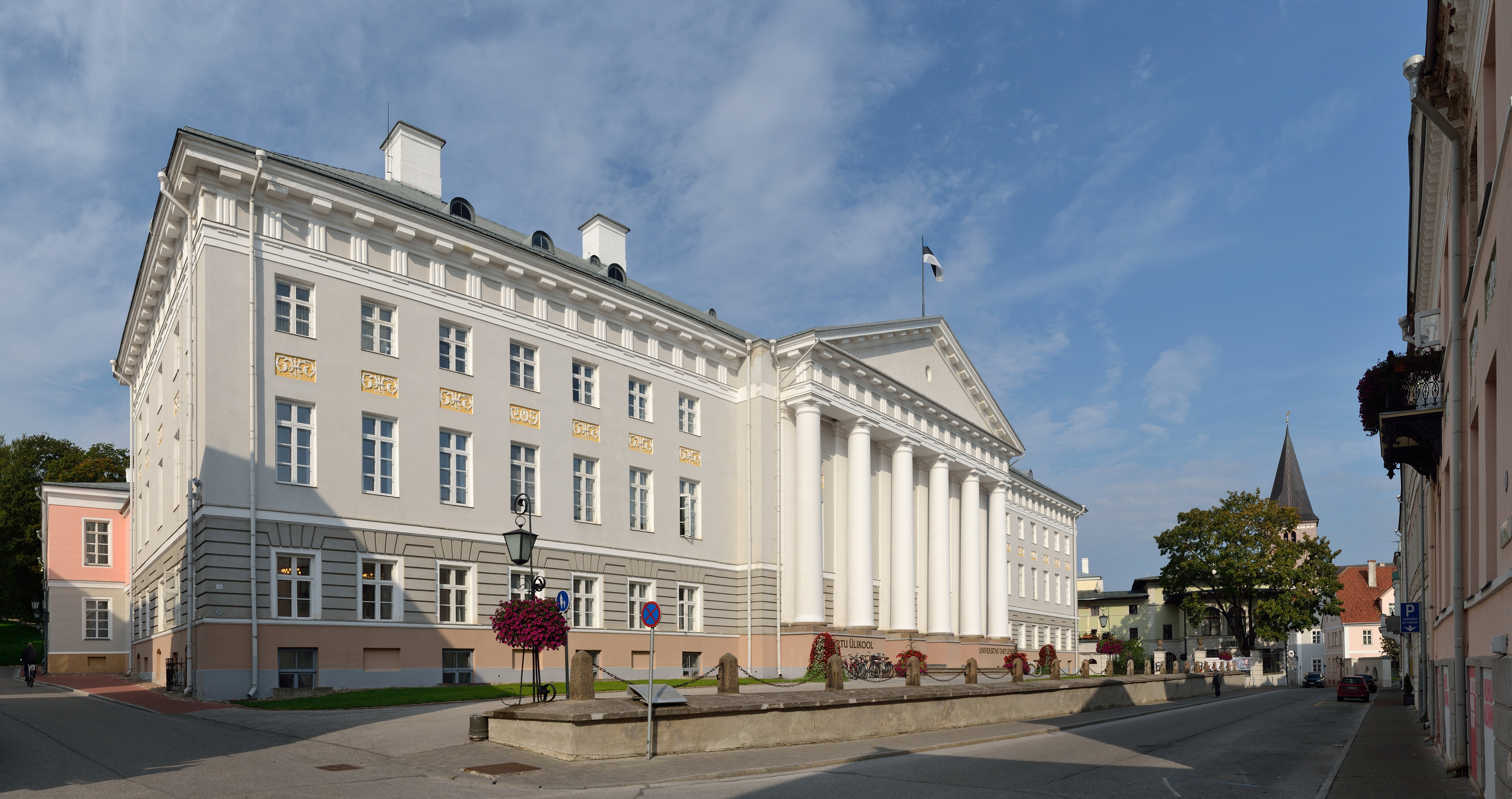
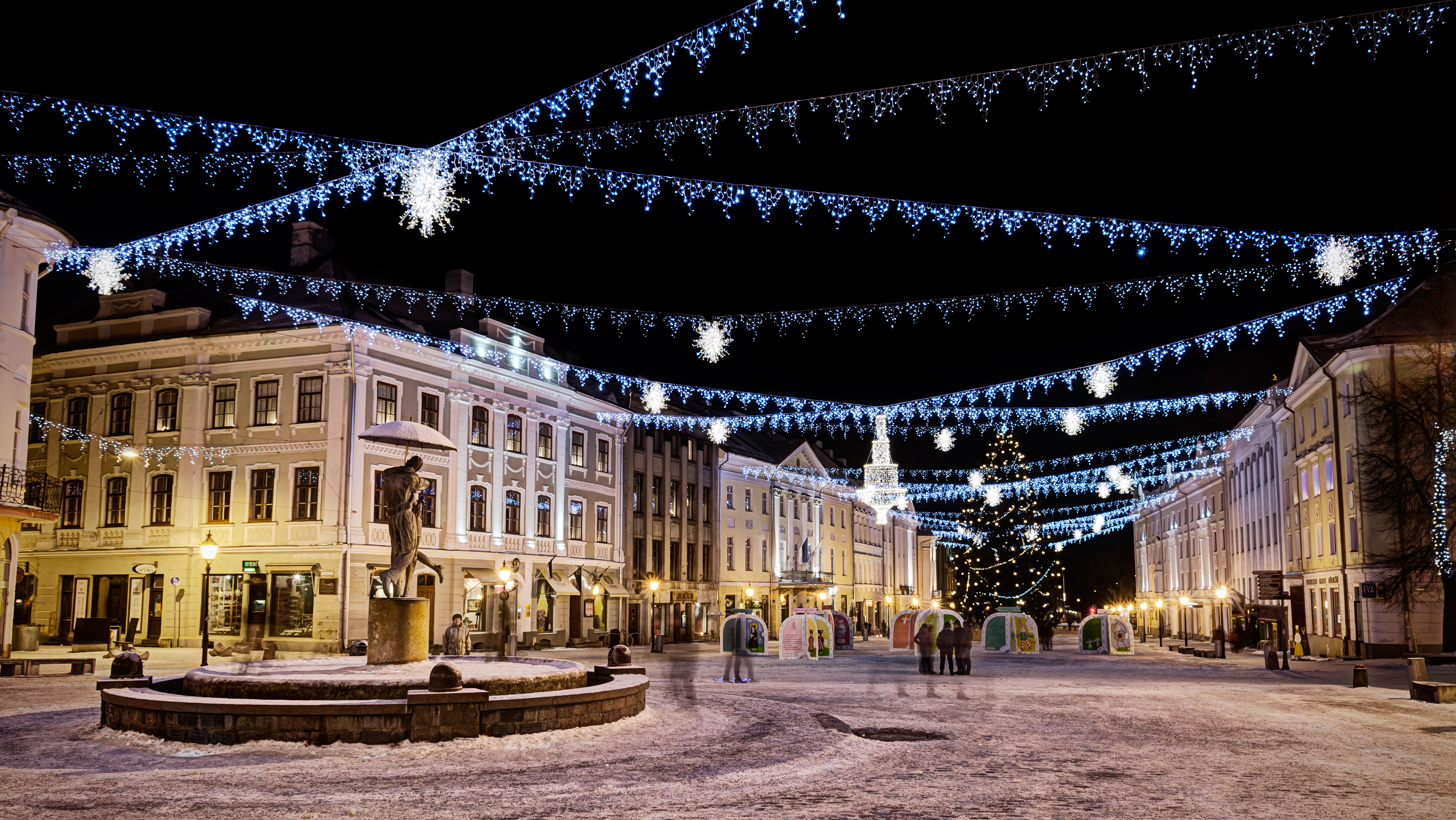
- View of Tartu and the Emajõgi River St. John's Church Estonian National Museum University of Tartu Town Hall Square
- Nickname: Capital of Southern Estonia
- Motto: Heade mõtete linn ("City of good ideas.")
- Interactive map of Tartu
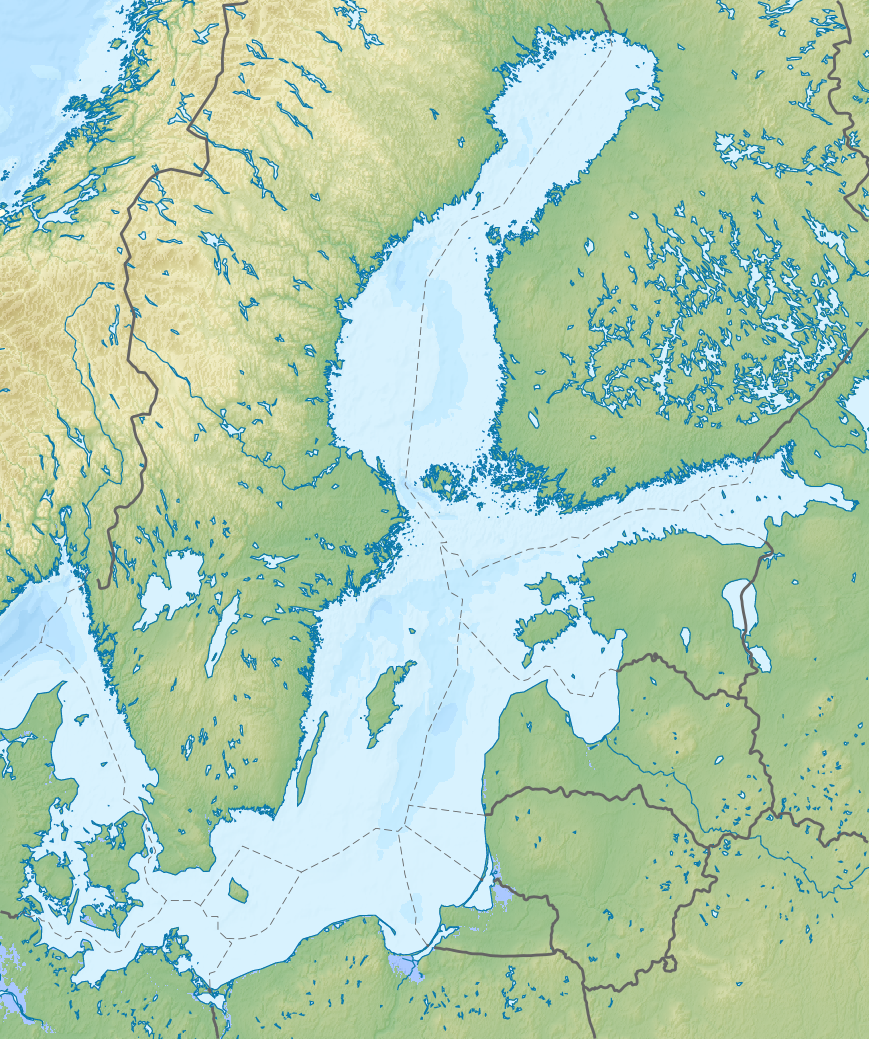
- Location within Europe Location within Baltic Sea region Location within Estonia
- Coordinates: 58°22′48″N 26°43′21″E
- Country: Estonia
- County: Tartu
- Municipality: Tartu
- First settled: 5th century AD
- First mentioned: c. 1030
- City rights: before 1262

Area
  - City: 38.80 km^{2} (14.98 sq mi)
  - Land: 37.9 km^{2} (14.6 sq mi)
  - Water: 1.3 km^{2} (0.50 sq mi) 3.39%
- Elevation: 57.2 m (188 ft)
- Highest elevation: 79 m (259 ft)

Population (2025)
  - City: 97,304
  - Rank: 2nd
  - Density: 2,570/km^{2} (6,650/sq mi)
  - Metro: 164,460
- Demonym: tartlane (Estonian)

GDP
  - Total: €3.247 billion (2023)
  - Per capita: €32,183 (2023)

Ethnicity
  - Estonians: 80.3%
  - Russians: 13.4%
  - other: 5.3%
- Time zone: UTC+02:00 (EET)
  - Summer (DST): UTC+03:00 (EEST)
- Postal code: 50050 to 51111
- Website: City of Tartu

Tartu (Note: /ˈtɑːrtu/ TAR-too, Estonian pronunciation: [ˈtɑrtˑu], South Estonian: Tarto, historically in German and Swedish: Dorpat) is the second-largest city in Estonia, after the capital, Tallinn. Tartu has a population of 97,304 (as of 2025), and is the seventh most-populous city in the Baltics. It is around 186 kilometres (116 miles) southeast of Tallinn and 245 kilometres (152 miles) northeast of Riga, Latvia. Tartu lies on the Emajõgi river, which connects the two largest lakes in Estonia, Lake Võrtsjärv and Lake Peipus. From the 13th century until the end of the 19th century, Tartu was known in most of the world by variants of its historical name Dorpat.

Aerial view of Toomemägi, Tartu cathedral and Tartu downtown

Tartu, the largest urban centre of southern Estonia, is often considered the "intellectual capital city" of the country, especially as it is home to the nation's oldest and most renowned university, the University of Tartu (founded in 1632). Tartu also houses the Supreme Court of Estonia, the Ministry of Education and Research, the Estonian National Museum, and the oldest Estonian-language theatre, Vanemuine. It is also the birthplace of the Estonian Song Festivals.

Tartu was designated as the European Capital of Culture in 2024.

== Names and etymology ==
It is thought that the name derives from the word for aurochs, tarvas. Since Estonia became an independent country in 1918, the Estonian-language Tartu (Estonian pronunciation: [ˈtɑrtˑu]), alternative South Estonian spelling: Tarto) has been the only name in official use but throughout its history there have also been various names for it in other languages. Most of them derive ultimately from the earliest attested form, the Estonian Tarbatu. In German, Swedish and Polish the town has been known, and up until the 20th century was sometimes referred to, as Dorpat, a variant of Tarbatu. Between 1893 and 1919, in Russian the city was known as Юрьев (Yur′yev, after Yuri, the baptismal name of grand prince Yaroslav I the Wise) and as Дерпт (Derpt, from the Low German variant of Dorpat). Similarly the city has been known as Tērbata in Latvian, and Finnish speakers use the toponym Tartto. Tartu lies on the Emajõgi River, whose name literally means 'mother river' in Estonian. In Latvian, the name of Emajõgi river is Mētra. Therefore, Tartu's historical unofficial name in Latvian is Mētraine. Historically, Tartu was the main center for Latvian academic education, which is the reason why the name of the city used to be Latvianized. In German, the Emajõgi River was called the Embach, which is why in German the city was also referred to as 'Embachstadt'.

== History ==
Historical affiliations
- Ugandi County pre-1030
- Kievan Rus' circa 1030–1061?
- Ugandi County 1061?–1220
- Livonian Brothers of the Sword 1220–1223
- Ugandi County 1223–1224
- Bishopric of Dorpat 1224–1558
- Tsardom of Russia 1558–1582
- Duchy of Livonia (Poland–Lithuania) 1582–1600
- Kingdom of Sweden 1600–1603
- Polish–Lithuanian Commonwealth 1603–1625
- Kingdom of Sweden 1625–1656
- Tsardom of Russia 1656–1661
- Kingdom of Sweden 1661–1704
- Tsardom of Russia (Muscovy) 1704–1721
- Russian Empire 1721–1917
- Russian Republic 1917
- Russian Soviet Republic 1917–1918
- Republic of Estonia 1918
- (German Empire) German occupation 1918
- Republic of Estonia 1918
- Commune of the Working People of Estonia 1918–1919
- Republic of Estonia 1919–1940
- Soviet Union 1940–1941
- (Nazi Germany) German occupation 1941–1944
- Soviet Union 1944–1990
- Republic of Estonia (in transition) 1990–1991
- Republic of Estonia 1991–onwards

=== Beginnings ===
Archaeological evidence of the first permanent settlement on the site of modern Tartu dates to as early as the 5th century AD. By the 7th century, local inhabitants had built a wooden fortification on the east side of Toome Hill (Toomemägi). Over the next centuries the settlement grew, and around 9th–10th centuries became an inland trading center.

The first documented records of the area were made by later mediaeval chroniclers who described the events of early-11th-century Kievan Rus'. According to the Primary Chronicle (PVL) and Sofia First Chronicle (SPL), Yaroslav the Wise, Grand Prince of Kiev, invaded the region of Tartu in c. 1030, and after defeating the Chud', built his own fort there, and named it Yuryev. Tartu may have remained under Kievan Rus' control until 1061, when, according to the SPL, the Yuryev fort was burned down by Sosols (probably Oeselians, Sackalians, or another Estonian tribe). Soon afterwards the fort was rebuilt by locals. In the 12th century, local Ungannians on one side and troops from the neighbouring Novgorod Republic on the other side repeatedly raided each other. In those campaigns, the invaders were reportedly able to capture Tartu in 1133 or 1134, and in the winter of 1191–1192, however these temporary captures are not known to have brought any lasting territorial changes.

=== Medieval bishopric ===
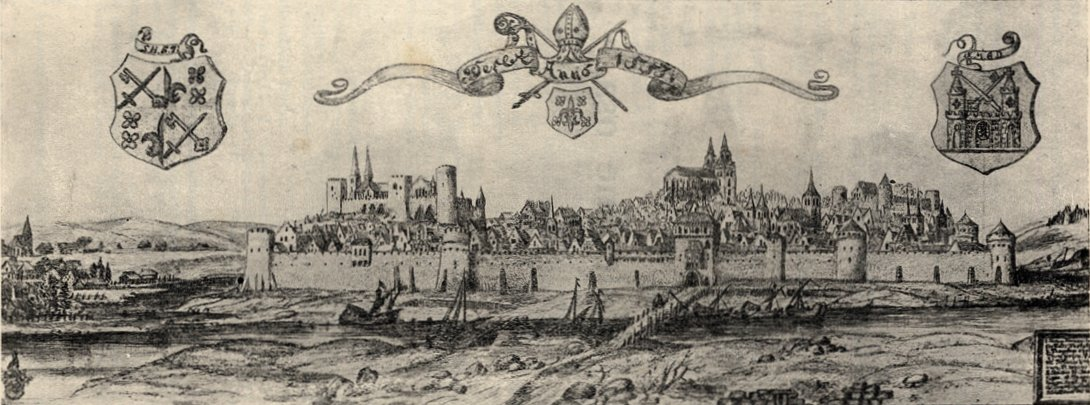
The city of Tartu in 1533

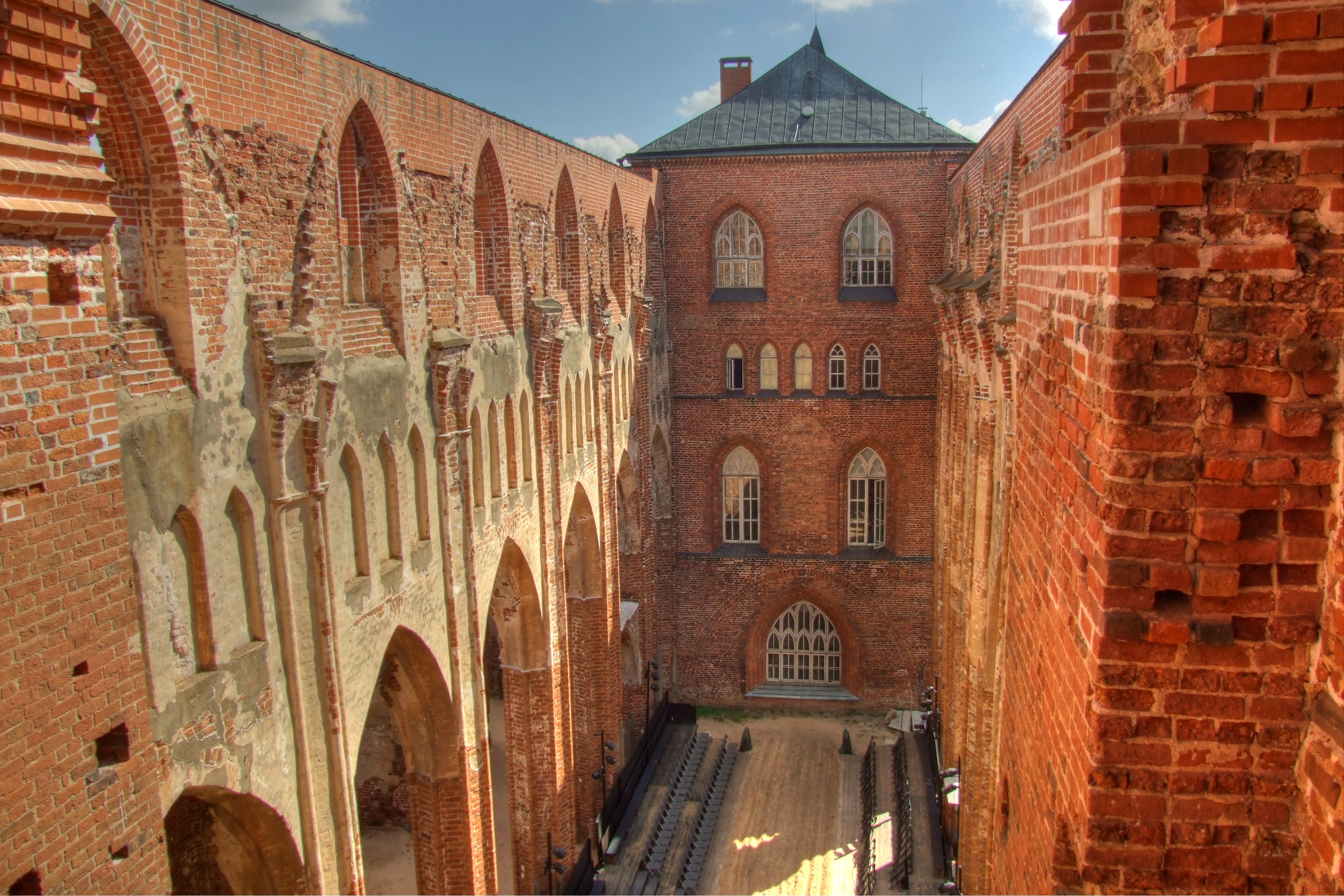
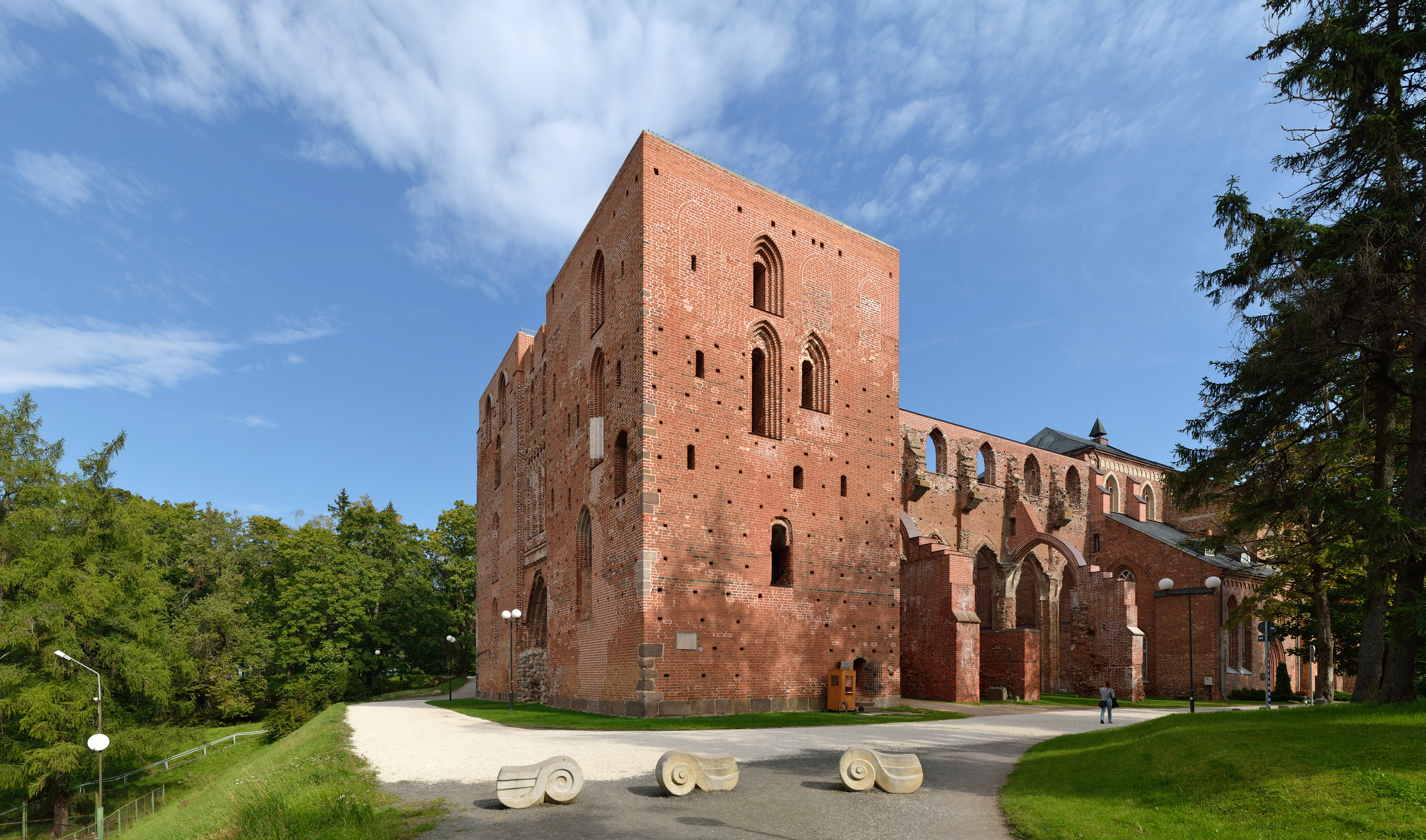
Tartu Cathedral ruins

During the period of Northern Crusades in the beginning of the 13th century the fort of Tarbatu (or Tharbata) was captured by the crusading Teutonic knights — also known as the Brothers of the Sword — and recaptured by Estonians on several occasions. In 1224, after the princes of Novgorod and Pskov had sent additional troops led by prince Vyachko of Kukenois to aid the Estonian defenders of the fort, it was besieged and conquered for one last time by the Teutonic crusaders. Subsequently, known as Dorpat (Latin: Tarbatum), Tartu became a commercial centre of considerable importance during the later Middle Ages and the capital of the semi-independent Bishopric of Dorpat.

In 1262 the army of prince Dmitri of Pereslavl launched an assault on Dorpat, capturing and destroying the town. His troops did not manage to capture the bishop's fortress on Toome Hill. The event was recorded both in subsequent German and Old East Slavic chronicles, which also provided the first record of a settlement of German merchants and artisans which had arisen alongside the bishop's fortress.

In medieval times, after the Livonian Order was subsumed into the Teutonic Knights in 1236, the town became an important trading city. In the 1280s Dorpat joined the Hanseatic League.

=== Polish-Lithuanian and Swedish rule ===
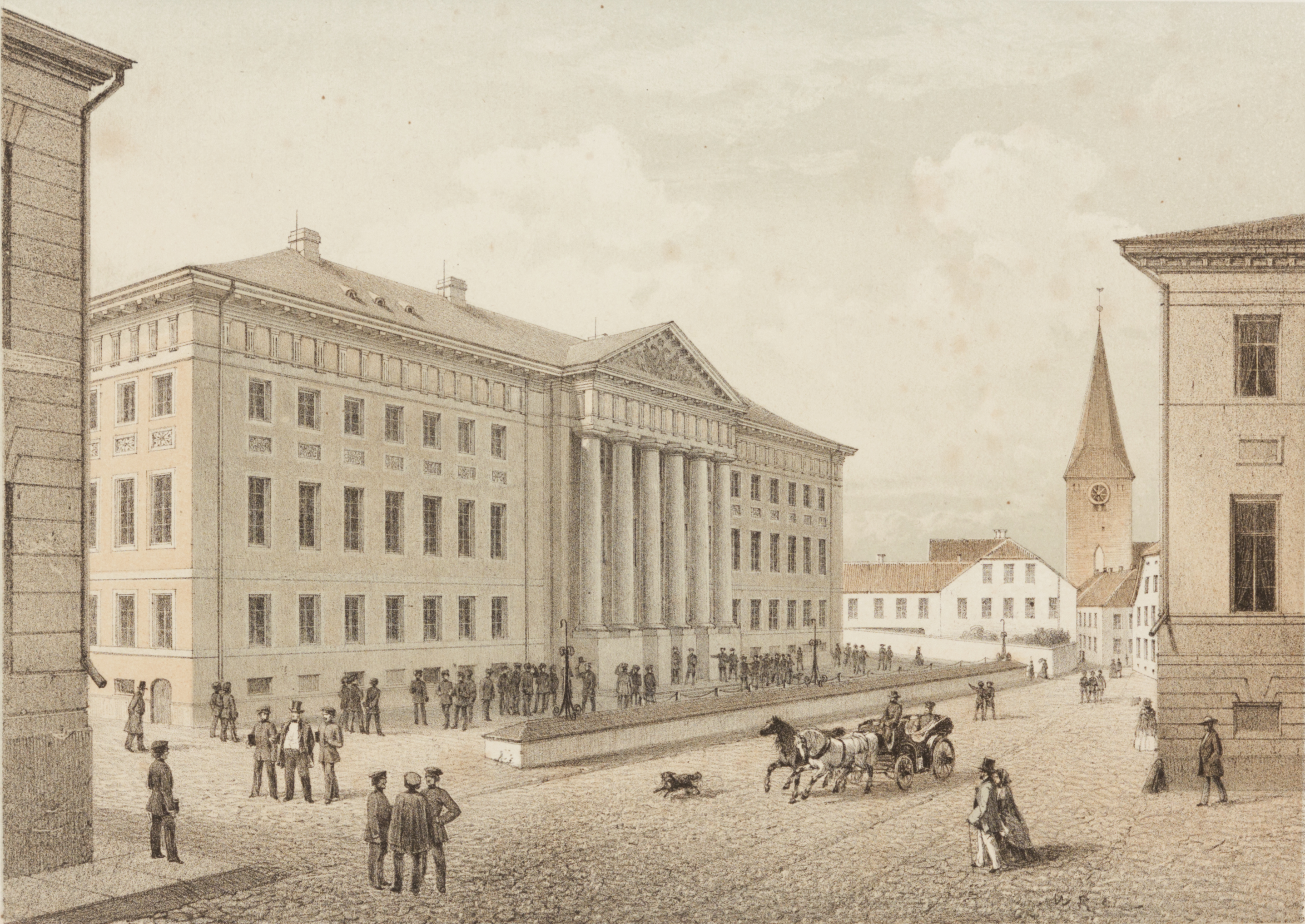
University of Tartu main building in 1860

In 1558, tsar Ivan the Terrible invaded Tartu beginning the Livonian War. Forces under the command of Pyotr Shuiski encircled the town and began the heavy bombardment. In light of this and without any prospect of external help the town surrendered. The local bishop was imprisoned in Moscow, which effectively ended the period of local self-government. Ivan Mikhailovich Viskovatyi, a leading diplomat and archivist of diplomatic records during Ivan the Terrible's reign, argued that Tartu's "founding" by Ancient Rus' justified Russia's contemporary territorial claims to the region. In the effect of the Truce of Jam Zapolski of 1582, the city along with southern regions of Livonian Confederation became part of the Polish–Lithuanian Commonwealth. In 1598 it became the capital of the Dorpat Voivodeship of the Duchy of Livonia. A Jesuit grammar school "Gymnasium Dorpatense" was established in 1583. In addition, a translators' seminary was organized in Tartu and the city received its red and white flag from the Polish king Stephen Báthory.

The activities of both the grammar school and the seminary were stopped by the Polish–Swedish War. Already in late 1600 the forces of Charles IX of Sweden besieged the city defended by three banners of reiters and the city's burghers. Despite repeated assaults, the Swedes could not enter the city. Finally in 1601 Capt. Hermann Wrangel switched sides, assaulted the castellan and opened the gates for the Swedish forces. The town was retaken by Polish–Lithuanian Commonwealth on 13 April 1603 following a brief siege led by hetman Jan Karol Chodkiewicz; roughly 1000 Swedish soldiers surrendered and were escorted to Tallinn.

In the effect of yet another Polish-Swedish War, in 1625 Tartu was once again captured by Sweden, this time for good. In the effect of the 1629 Truce of Altmark the city became part of the Dominions of Sweden, which led to the foundation of the University of Tartu in 1632 by king Gustavus Adolphus of Sweden.

=== Imperial Russia ===
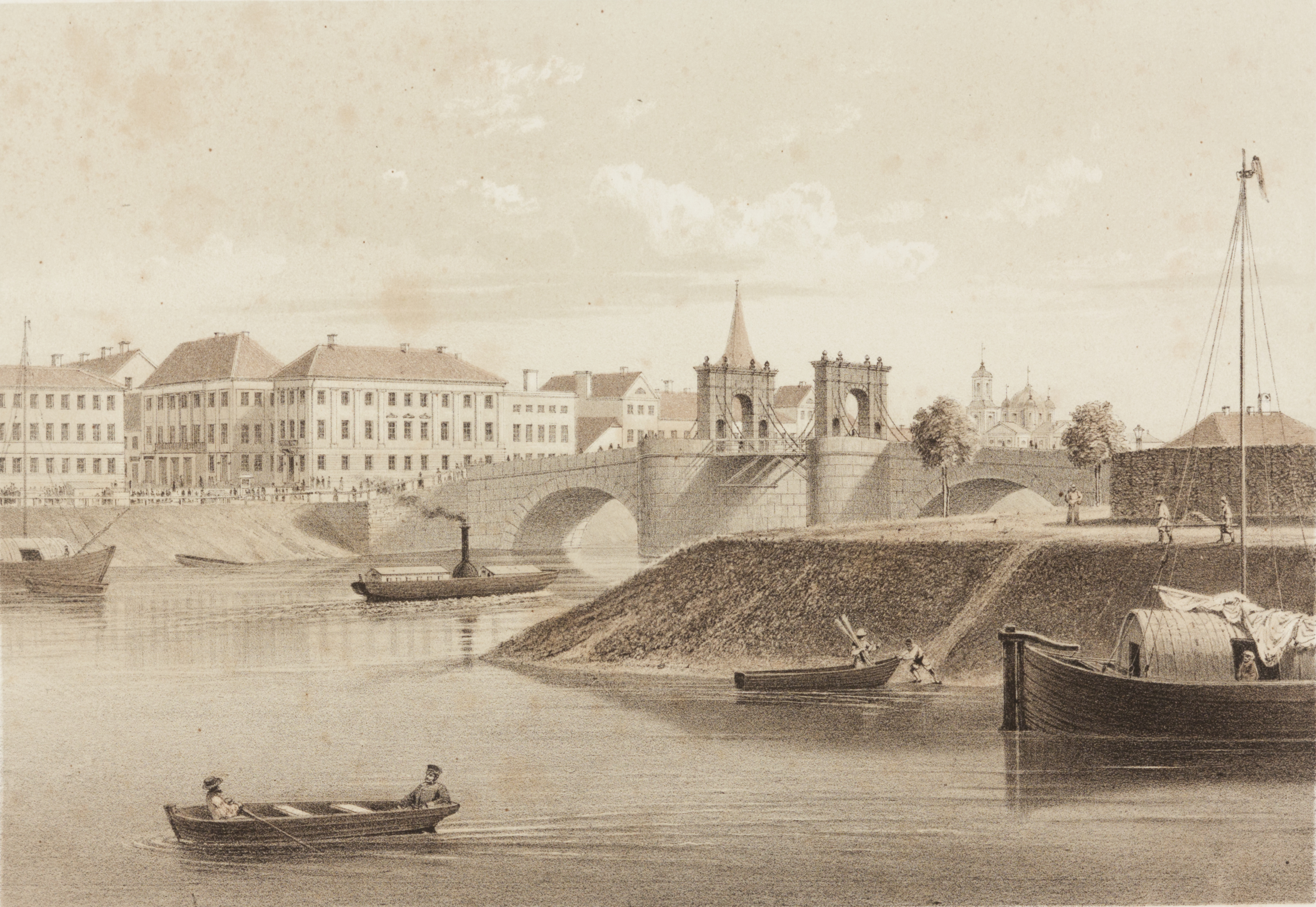
The Stone Bridge and the Old Town in 1860

In 1704 the town was taken by the Russian army in the presence of Tsar Peter the Great himself. As a result, around a quarter of the town and much of the fortifications were damaged. In 1708 the remainder of the fortifications and houses, including the remains of bishops castle, were blown up, all movable property was looted and all citizens were deported to Russia. With the Treaty of Nystad in 1721, the city became part of the Russian Empire and was known as Derpt. Fires in the 18th century destroyed much of the medieval architecture, the Great Fire of Tartu in 1775 removed most of the buildings in the centre. The city was rebuilt along Late Baroque and Neoclassical lines including the Tartu Town Hall which was built between 1782 and 1789. In 1783 the city became the centre of Derpt uyezd within the Governorate of Livonia.

During the second half of the 19th century, Tartu was the cultural centre for Estonians in the era of Romantic nationalism. The city hosted Estonia's first song festival in 1869. Vanemuine, the first national theatre, was established in 1870. Tartu was also the setting for the foundation of the Society of Estonian Literati in 1872.

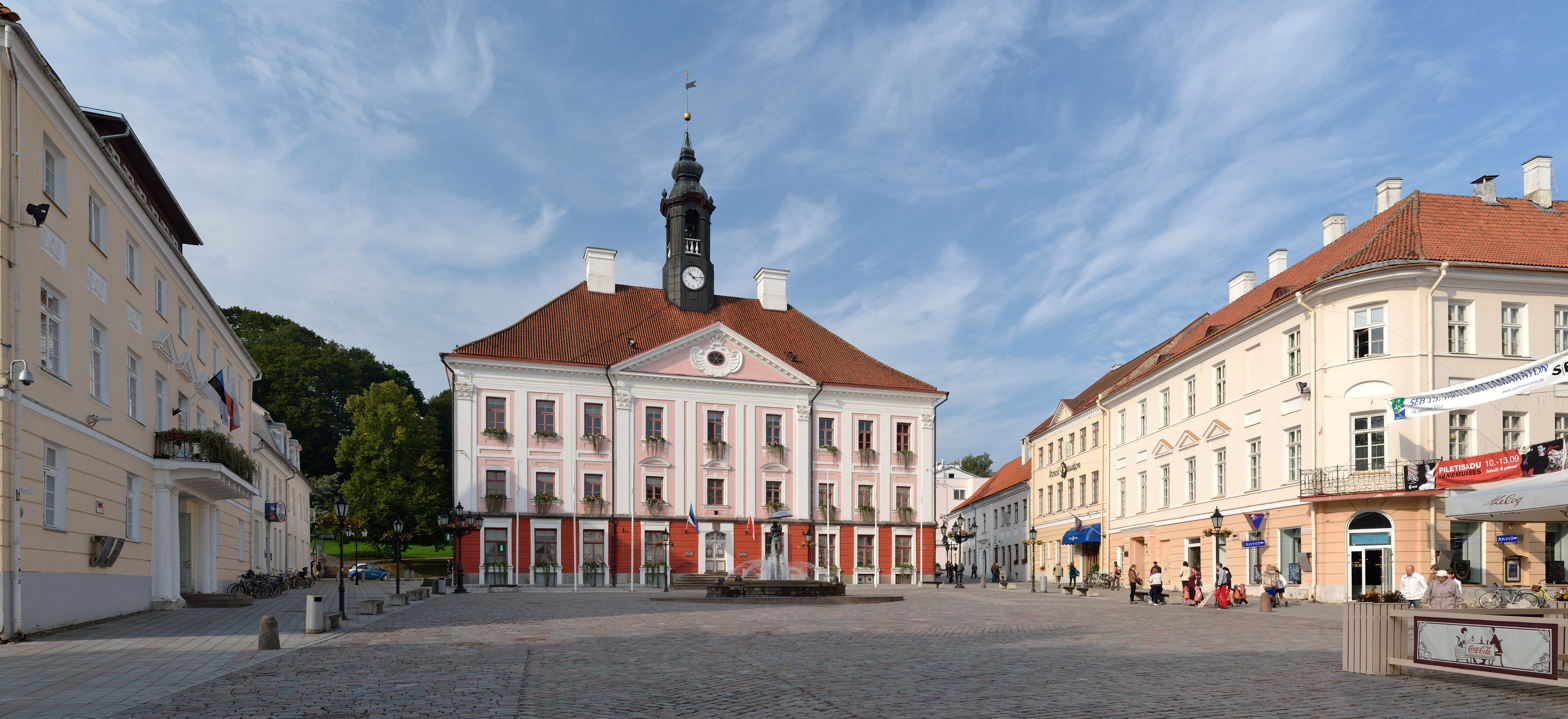
Tartu Town Hall

Tartu railway station was opened in 1876 when Tapa–Tartu route was built. The station building was opened in 1877. In the history of tuberculosis, in 1891 The Veterinary College at Dorpat produced seminal research using the Tuberculin test on 1,000 cattle.

In 1893, the city was officially retitled to the ancient Russian name Yuryev. The university was subsequently russified from 1895 on with the introduction of compulsory Russian in teaching. Much of the university property was relocated to Voronezh in 1918 and during the German occupation, the university worked under the name Landesuniversität Dorpat. During the Estonian War of Independence the university of Tartu was re-opened as an Estonian language university on 1 December 1919.

=== Independent Estonia (1918–1940) ===
With Estonian independence after World War I, the city officially became known by the Estonian name Tartu. At the end of the 1918–1920 Estonian War of Independence following World War I, a peace treaty between the Bolshevik Russia and Estonia was signed on 2 February 1920 in Tartu (Treaty of Tartu). With the treaty, Soviet Russia renounced territorial claims to Estonia "for all time".

In 1920, the peace treaty between Soviet Russia and Finland was also signed in Tartu.

During the interwar period Tähtvere neighbourhood was built, former Raadi Manor buildings started to house Estonian National Museum (destroyed during Tartu Offensive in 1944) and art school Pallas was opened.

=== German and Soviet occupations (1940–1991) ===
During World War II, the Stalinist Soviet Union invaded and occupied Estonia and Tartu in June 1940. Large parts of the city as well as the historical Kivisild ("Stone bridge", built in 1776–1778) over the Emajõgi river were destroyed by the retreating Soviet Army, partly in 1941 and almost completely in 1944 by the then retreating German Army. Already heavily damaged, Tartu was repeatedly bombed by the Soviet air forces on 27 January 1943, on 26 February 1944, on 7–8 March 1944, and on 25–26 March 1944. After the war ended, much of the city's historic centre was left in ruins. Even the less damaged buildings in entire city blocks were demolished by the Soviet occupation authorities and large swathes of previously residential areas were turned into parks and parking lots.

After the war, the Soviet authorities declared Tartu a "closed town for foreigners", as an airbase for bombers was constructed on Raadi Airfield, in the northeast outskirts of the city. It was one of the largest military airbases in the former Eastern Bloc and housed strategic bombers carrying nuclear bombs. On one end of an older strip of the runway, the new building of Estonian National Museum was built.

Tartu Airport was opened in the south of the city in 1946. Besides the airport Estonian Aviation Academy was established in 1993. Privately owned Estonian Aviation Museum, which is 5 km to the East of the airport (7 km by car), was opened to the public in 2002.

During the 1944–1991 Soviet occupation the population of Tartu almost doubled from 57,000 to above 100,000 due to mass immigration from Russia and other areas of the former Soviet Union, in large part because of the military airbase.

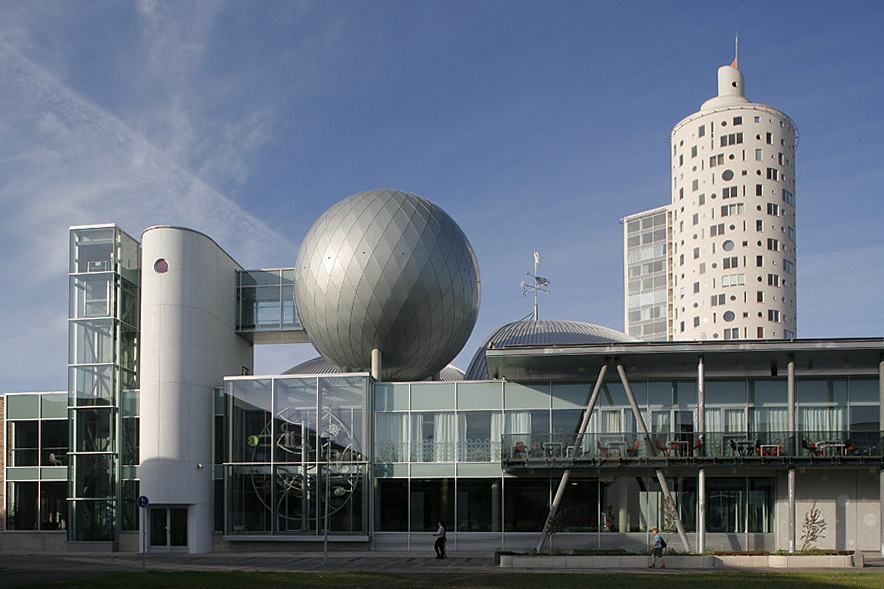
AHHAA Science Centre with Tigutorn visible in the background

=== Modern era ===
Since Estonia regained its independence in 1991, the old town centre has been renovated. Notably, St. John's Church, in ruins since World War II, has been restored. Many new commercial and business buildings have been erected (Tartu Kaubamaja, Tasku, Emajõe kaubanduskeskus, Lõunakeskus, Kvartal, etc.). The highest residential building and local landmark Tigutorn was opened in 2008.

The AHHAA science centre relocated to a new building in 2011 and the Estonian National Museum's new main building opened in 2016.

== Geography ==
=== Climate ===
Tartu lies within the temperate humid continental climate zone (Dfb). The climate is rather mild considering the high latitude, largely due to the proximity of the Baltic Sea and warm airflows from the Atlantic. Nevertheless, continental influence can be felt on hot summer days and cold spells in winter, when the temperature can occasionally (but rarely) drop below −30 °C (−22 °F). Generally, summers are warm and winters are cold.

Since 1964, the Tartu weather station has been located in Tõravere, which is about 20 kilometers from the city, so the actual temperature in the city may be slightly warmer than the official average temperatures.

Climate data for Tartu (Tõravere) normals 1991–2020, extremes 1865–present
Month	Jan	Feb	Mar	Apr	May	Jun	Jul	Aug	Sep	Oct	Nov	Dec	Year
Record high °C (°F)	9.7 (49.5)	10.9 (51.6)	18.4 (65.1)	27.6 (81.7)	30.9 (87.6)	34.0 (93.2)	34.9 (94.8)	35.2 (95.4)	30.3 (86.5)	21.5 (70.7)	13.8 (56.8)	13.0 (55.4)	35.2 (95.4)
Mean daily maximum °C (°F)	−1.8 (28.8)	−1.6 (29.1)	3.3 (37.9)	11.1 (52.0)	17.1 (62.8)	20.6 (69.1)	23.1 (73.6)	21.8 (71.2)	16.3 (61.3)	9.2 (48.6)	3.3 (37.9)	0.0 (32.0)	10.2 (50.4)
Daily mean °C (°F)	−4.1 (24.6)	−4.4 (24.1)	−0.5 (31.1)	5.9 (42.6)	11.5 (52.7)	15.5 (59.9)	18.0 (64.4)	16.7 (62.1)	11.8 (53.2)	6.0 (42.8)	1.2 (34.2)	−2.1 (28.2)	6.3 (43.3)
Mean daily minimum °C (°F)	−6.5 (20.3)	−7.3 (18.9)	−4 (25)	1.2 (34.2)	5.8 (42.4)	10.3 (50.5)	12.9 (55.2)	12.0 (53.6)	8.0 (46.4)	3.3 (37.9)	−0.8 (30.6)	−4.2 (24.4)	2.6 (36.7)
Record low °C (°F)	−37.5 (−35.5)	−36.0 (−32.8)	−29.6 (−21.3)	−19.8 (−3.6)	−7.2 (19.0)	−2.2 (28.0)	1.8 (35.2)	1.5 (34.7)	−6.6 (20.1)	−13.8 (7.2)	−22.2 (−8.0)	−38.6 (−37.5)	−38.6 (−37.5)
Average precipitation mm (inches)	48 (1.9)	39 (1.5)	36 (1.4)	35 (1.4)	54 (2.1)	88 (3.5)	67 (2.6)	79 (3.1)	55 (2.2)	68 (2.7)	55 (2.2)	51 (2.0)	673 (26.5)
Average precipitation days (≥ 1.0 mm)	12.8	9.9	9.3	8.3	8.5	10.7	9.5	11.2	9.8	11.9	11.3	12.4	125.6
Average relative humidity (%)	88	85	76	68	65	70	74	77	82	86	89	89	79
Average dew point °C (°F)	−7 (19)	−8 (18)	−4 (25)	0 (32)	6 (43)	10 (50)	13 (55)	13 (55)	9 (48)	4 (39)	1 (34)	−3 (27)	3 (37)
Mean monthly sunshine hours	33.7	65.1	140.3	190.9	266.0	258.0	268.7	227.6	152.1	79.3	30.0	24.3	1,735.9
Source 1: Estonian Weather Service
Source 2: Time and Date (dewpoints, 2005-2015)

== Economy ==
Emajõe Business Centre (left) and Snail Tower (right)

Mostly known as a university town, Tartu is also a site of heavy industry. The food industry has traditionally been important for the town's economy and some bigger companies in the field include A. Le Coq, Tartu Mill and Salvest. Kroonpress is one of the leading printing press companies in the Baltics.

At the beginning of the 21st century, many ICT enterprises and other high-tech companies have taken a foothold in Tartu. Notable examples include Playtech Estonia, Nortal (formerly Webmedia Group), ZeroTurnaround, Tarkon, Reach-U and Raintree Estonia. Skype has an office in Tartu. The university is one of the largest employers, which explains the large proportion of highly skilled professionals – researchers, professors, doctors, and Tartu University Clinic has been considered the largest employer of Tartu.

== Transport ==
The city is served by Tartu Airport. The distance to Estonia's "summer holiday capital", Pärnu (in the western Estonia) is 176 kilometres (109 miles) and the fastest route there by road is through Viljandi and Kilingi-Nõmme. Tartu is connected to Riga in Latvia as well as Tallinn and other Estonian towns by many bus and train routes.

National Roads 2 (Tallinn-Tartu-Võru-Luhamaa) and 3 (Jõhvi–Tartu–Valga) pass through the city, whilst National Road 92 (Tartu-Viljandi-Kilingi-Nõmme) starts in Tartu.

Tartu railway station was established in 1876. Government-owned passenger rail company Elron runs regular daily trains to Tallinn, Valga and Koidula.

Buses are also available to various destinations in Estonia.

== Demographics ==
Tartu's historic population is presented in the following table, based on data from official censuses since 1881 and Estonian Statistical Office. Note that the data up to 2011 is not directly comparable to the most recent numbers, as the methodology of compiling population statistics has changed.

Historical population
Year	1881	1897	1922	1934	1959	1970	1979	1989	2000	2011	2021
Pop.	29,974	42,308	50,342	58,876	74,263	90,459	104,381	113,420	101,118	97,600	95,190
±%	—	+41.1%	+19.0%	+17.0%	+26.1%	+21.8%	+15.4%	+8.7%	−10.8%	−3.5%	−2.5%
Source: Censuses

Ethnic composition 1922–2021
Ethnicity	1922		1934		1941		1959		1970		1979		1989		2000		2011		2021	
Ethnicity	amount	%	amount	%	amount	%	amount	%	amount	%	amount	%	amount	%	amount	%	amount	%	amount	%
Estonians	42,459	84.5	51,559	87.6	44,732	93.7	56,205	75.7	68,129	75.3	77,597	74.3	82,031	72.3	80,397	79.5	79,700	81.7	76,227	80.1
Russians	2,570	5.11	2,640	4.48	1,490	3.12	-	-	18,009	19.9	21,530	20.6	24,604	21.7	16,245	16.1	14,340	14.7	12,441	13.1
Ukrainians	-	-	16	0.03	-	-	-	-	1,277	1.41	1,685	1.61	2369	2.09	1,239	1.22	891	0.91	1,107	1.16
Belarusians	-	-	-	-	-	-	-	-	551	0.61	749	0.72	1,088	0.96	490	0.48	355	0.36	304	0.32
Finns	-	-	49	0.08	27	0.06	-	-	1,220	1.35	1,271	1.22	1,275	1.12	1,073	1.06	706	0.72	900	0.95
Jews	1,115	2.22	920	1.56	0	0.00	-	-	420	0.46	346	0.33	267	0.24	154	0.15	113	0.12	81	0.09
Latvians	-	-	278	0.47	1,043	2.18	-	-	137	0.15	197	0.19	167	0.15	105	0.10	113	0.12	268	0.28
Germans	3,210	6.39	2,706	4.60	-	-	-	-	-	-	103	0.10	133	0.12	123	0.12	118	0.12	306	0.32
Tatars	-	-	6	0.01	-	-	-	-	-	-	112	0.11	146	0.13	83	0.08	65	0.07	45	0.05
Poles	-	-	144	0.24	71	0.15	-	-	-	-	164	0.16	179	0.16	137	0.14	92	0.09	133	0.14
Lithuanians	-	-	26	0.04	15	0.03	-	-	102	0.11	127	0.12	159	0.14	96	0.09	74	0.08	109	0.11
unknown	0	0.00	278	0.47	44	0.09	0	0.00	0	0.00	0	0.00	0	0.00	378	0.37	136	0.14	255	0.27
other	902	1.79	254	0.43	335	0.70	18,058	24.3	614	0.68	500	0.48	1,002	0.88	649	0.64	897	0.92	3,014	3.17
Total	50,256	100	58,876	100	47,757	100	74,263	100	90,459	100	104,381	100	113,420	100	101,169	100	97,600	100	95,190	100

== Neighbourhoods ==
Tartu is officially divided into 17 neighbourhoods, which carry no administrative purposes. Their names and borders are defined.

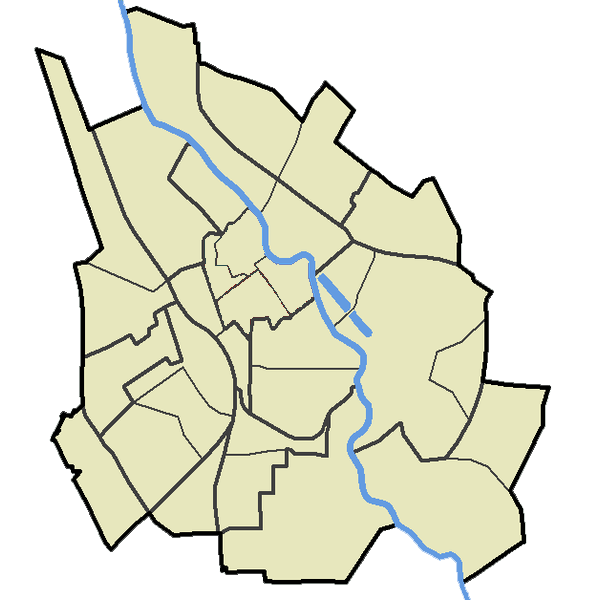

Neighborhood	Area (ha)	Residents 2001	Residents 2006	Residents 2012
Annelinn	541	30,000	28,200	27,480
Ihaste	424	1,000	1,800	2,322
Jaamamõisa	149	3,000	3,000	3,202
Karlova	230	9,500	9,000	9,073
Kesklinn (Downtown)	180	7,500	6,700	6,575
Maarjamõisa	113	800	500	377
Raadi-Kruusamäe	283	5,000	4,800	4,626
Ropka	146	5,500	5,300	5,120
Ropka industrial district	354	2,700	2,700	2,511
Ränilinn	122	2,500	1,800	1,732
Supilinn	48	2,100	1,800	1,790
Tammelinn	311	8,000	8,100	8,195
Tähtvere	250	4,500	3,500	3,023
Vaksali	75	2,900	3,100	3,206
Variku	77	2,000	1,900	1,840
Veeriku	281	5,500	5,300	5,561
Ülejõe	302	8,200	7,700	7,876

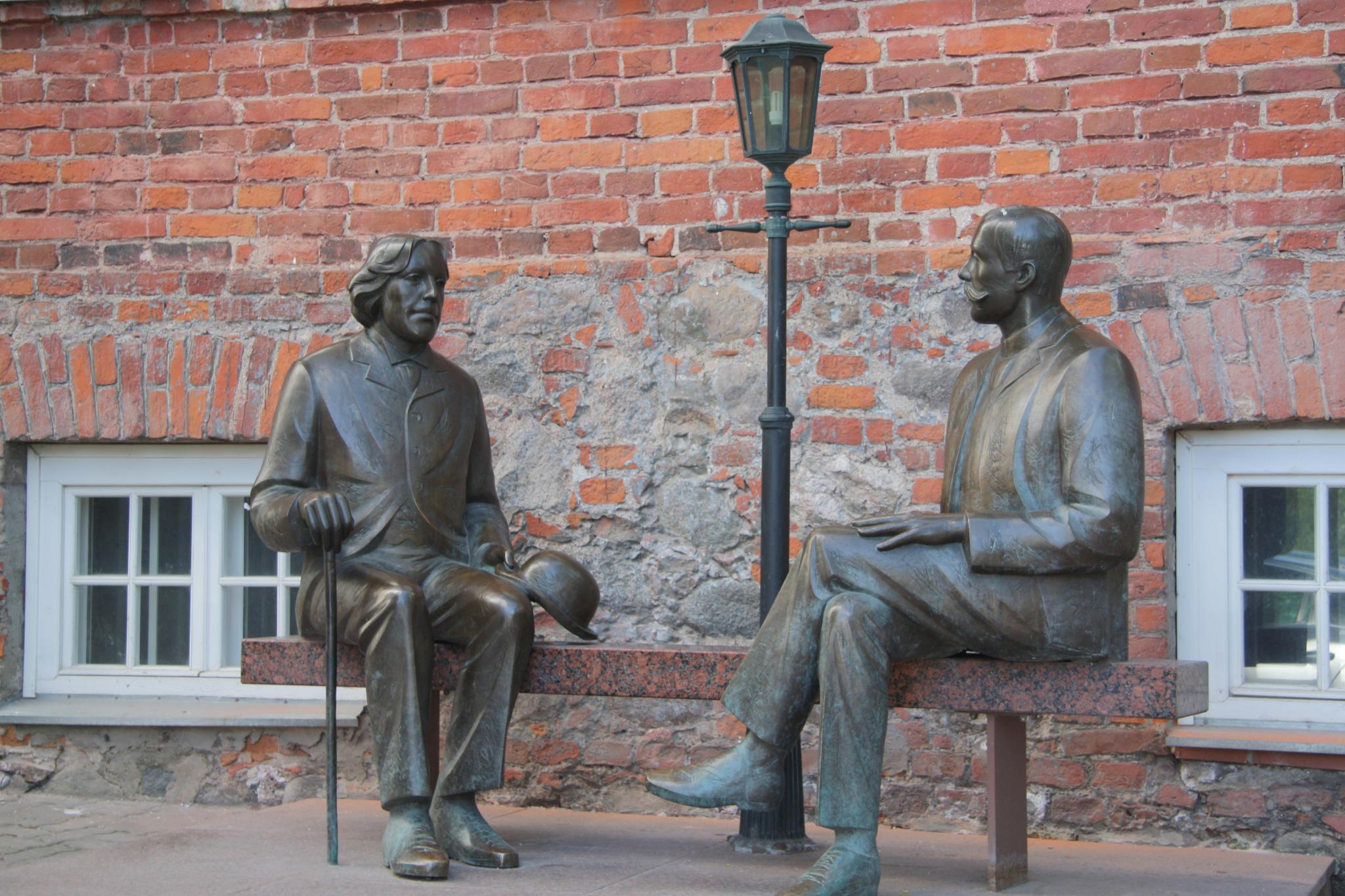
A memorial to Oscar Wilde and Eduard Vilde

== Education and culture ==
The city is best known for being home to the University of Tartu (formerly known as the University of Dorpat; German: Universität Dorpat), founded under King Gustavus Adolphus of Sweden in 1632. Mainly for this reason, Tartu is also – tongue-in-cheek – known as "Athens of the Emajõgi" or as "Heidelberg of the North".

Tartu is also the seat of the Estonian University of Life Sciences, the Baltic Defence College, Estonian Aviation Academy (formerly known as Tartu Aviation College), and the Estonian Ministry of Education and Research. Other notable institutions include the Supreme Court of Estonia (re-established in Tartu in autumn 1993), the Estonian Historical Archives, Estonian National Museum, Estonian Sports and Olympic Museum as well as the oldest and renowned theatre in the country, Vanemuine, where they have a well-respected ballet company as well as theatre, opera and musical productions.

In music, there exists the Tartu school of composition.

Most of the sculptures in Tartu are dedicated to historical figures. Among them, the most famous are the Barclay de Tolly monument on Barclay Square in downtown, the Kissing Students monument on the town hall square and Gustav II Adolf´s monument on King's Square (Kuningaplats).

== Science ==
Tartu has been an intellectual centre of both Estonia and the Baltic countries for several centuries. Scholars hailing from Tartu include the pioneer of embryology Karl Ernst von Baer, a pioneer of animal behaviour studies Jakob von Uexküll, and a cultural theorist and semiotician Juri Lotman. Johann Friedrich von Eschscholtz, a Baltic German physician, naturalist, and entomologist, was born in Tartu. He was one of the earliest scientific explorers of the Pacific region, making significant collections of flora and fauna in Alaska, California, and Hawaii. Nobel Chemistry Prize laureate Wilhelm Ostwald studied and worked in Tartu. The Tartu School is one of the leading scientific schools in semiotics.

== Main sights ==
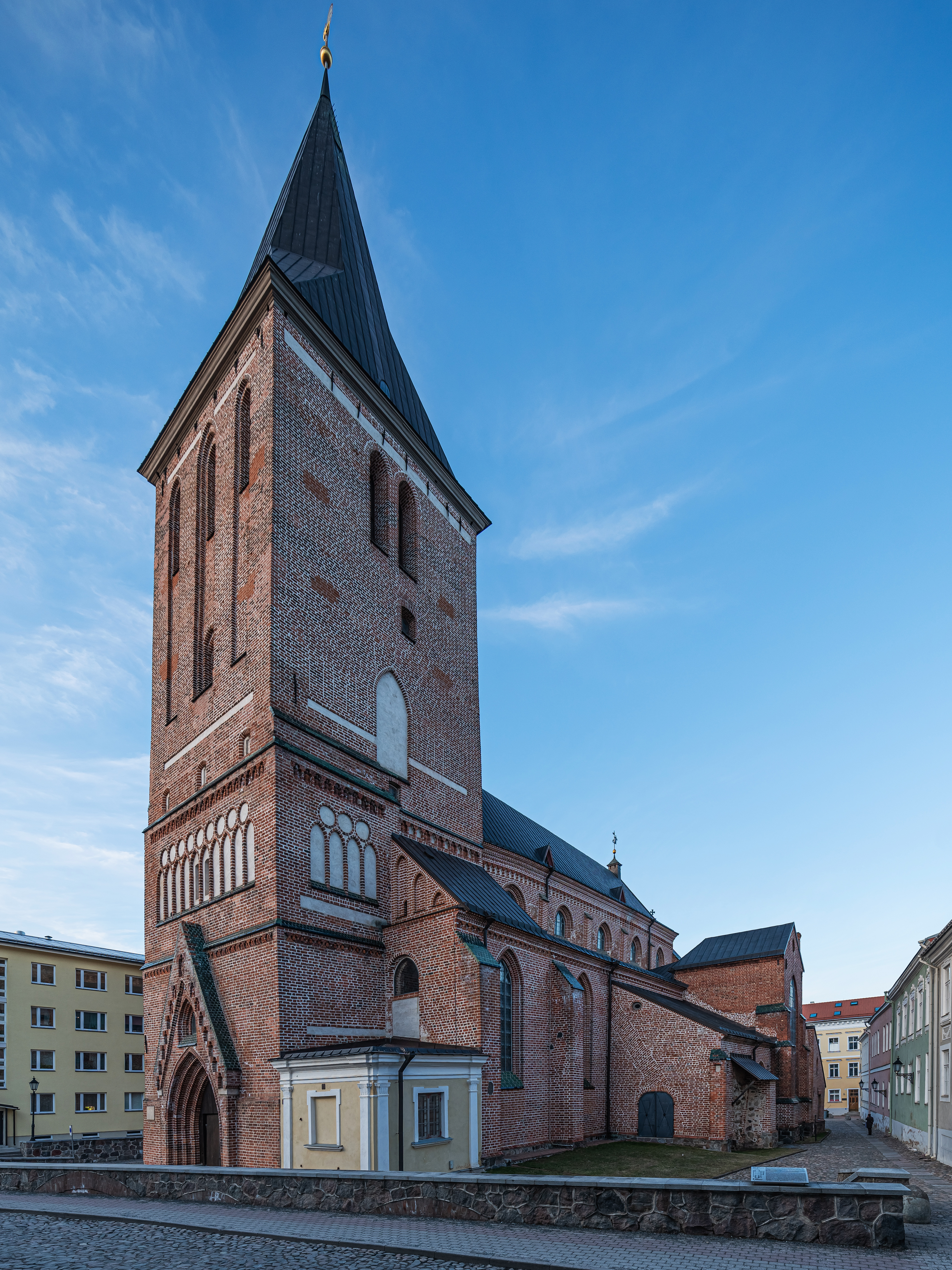
St. John's Church

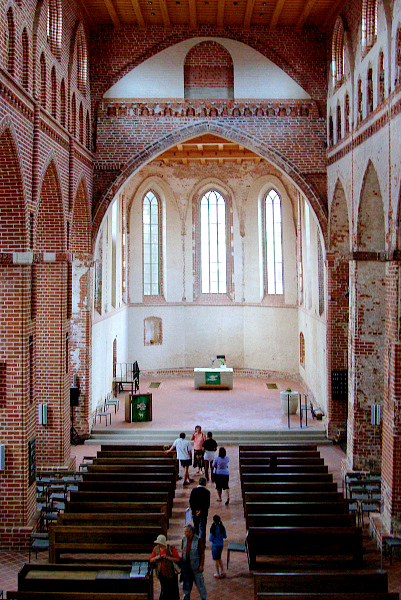
Interior

The architecture and city planning of historical Tartu mainly go back to the pre-independence period, with Germans forming the upper and middle classes of society, and therefore contributing many architects, professors and local politicians.

Most notable are the old Lutheran St. John's Church (Estonian: Jaani Kirik, German: Johanneskirche), the 18th-century town hall, the university building, ruins of the 13th-century cathedral, the botanical gardens, the main shopping street, many buildings around the town hall square and Barclay Square.

Parts of the medieval city wall are preserved in Lai Street and Vabaduse Street.

The historical slum area called Supilinn (Soup Town) is located on the bank of river Emajõgi, near the town centre and is regarded as one of the few surviving "poor" neighbourhoods of 19th-century Europe. At the moment Supilinn is being rapidly renovated, undergoing a slow transformation from the historic slum into a prestigious high-class neighborhood. The active community embodied by the Supilinn Society is committed to preserving the heritage.

The Second World War destroyed large parts of the city centre and during the Soviet occupation, many new buildings were erected – notably the new Vanemuine Theater. The effects of the war are still witnessed by the relative abundance of parks and greenery in the historic centre. Typical Soviet-style neighbourhoods of blocks of high-rise flats were built between World War II and the restoration of Estonian independence in 1991, the largest such district being Annelinn.

Presently, Tartu is also known for several modern buildings of the "steel, concrete and glass" variation, but has managed to retain a mix of old and new buildings in the centre of town. Notable examples include the Tigutorn Tower and the Emajõe Centre, both built during the current period of independence; Tartu's tallest and second tallest towers, respectively. Tartu's large student population means that it has a comparatively thriving nightlife, with many nightclubs, bars, and restaurants, including the world's highest-ceiling pub, in the historic Gunpowder Cellar of Tartu.

Annually, in the summer, Tartu hosts the Hanseatic Days festival (Estonian: Hansapäevad) to celebrate its Hanseatic heritage. The festival includes events such as handicraft markets, historic workshops and jousting tournaments.

== Sports ==
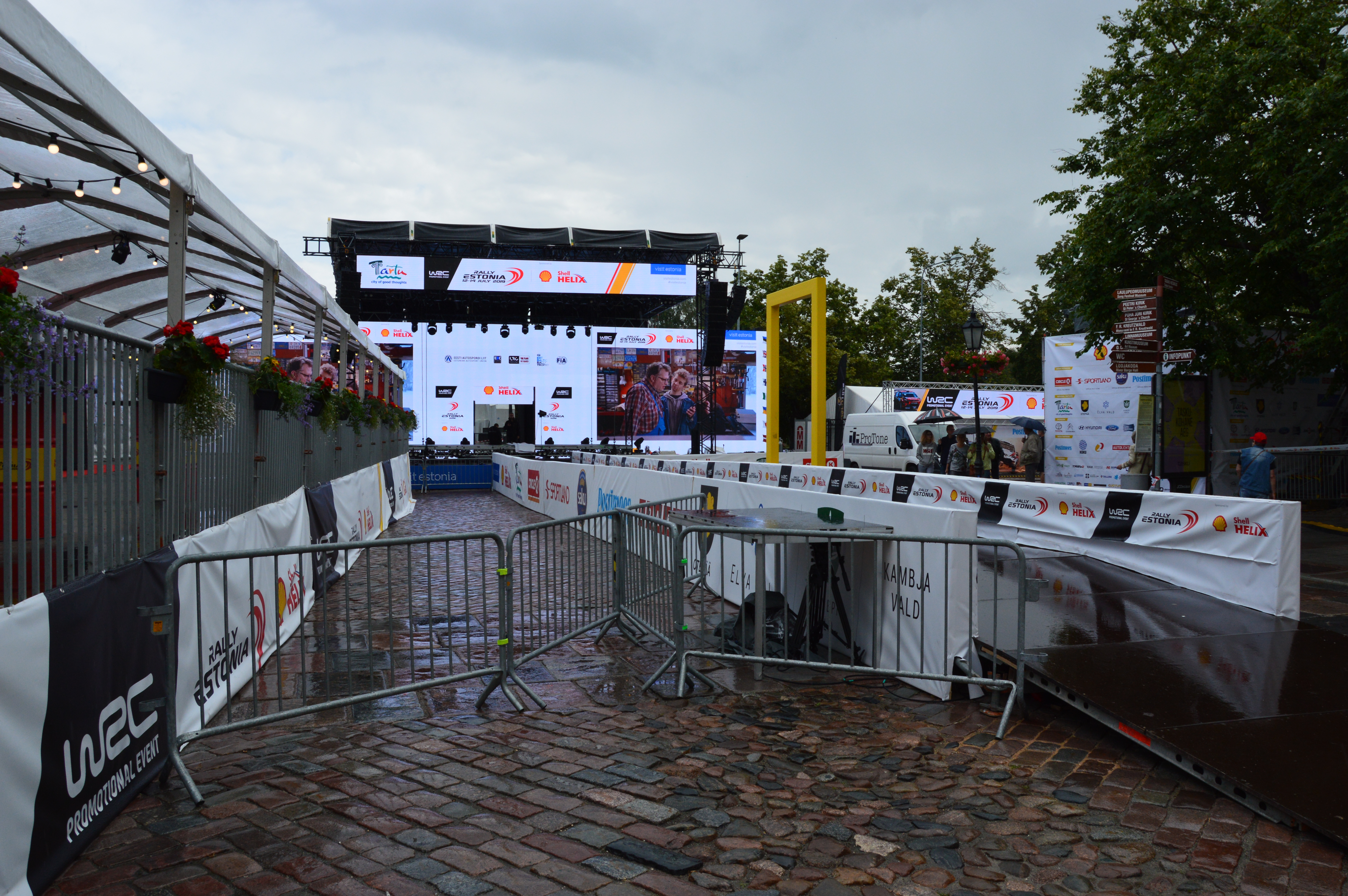
Rally Estonia ceremonial start place

The city hosts the Rally Estonia. It is the biggest motorsport event in the Baltic states. The rally was part of the European Rally Championship between 2014 and 2016. Since 2020 Rally Estonia is part of the World Rally Championship.

Tartu is the home for basketball club Tartu Ülikool/Rock, which participates in the Korvpalli Meistriliiga and the Latvian-Estonian Basketball League.

Football club JK Tammeka Tartu, one of the Meistriliiga clubs, is located in Tartu. Their home stadium is the Tamme Staadion, which has a capacity of 1600. The city is also home to the Tartu JK Welco and FC Santos Tartu clubs, which play in the Esiliiga, the second division.

Tartu has a professional volleyball club, Bigbank Tartu, as well as the handball team, the Tartu Ülikool/Glassdrive, which plays in the second division of Estonian handball.

Tartu is also the hometown of Clement "Puppey" Ivanov, captain of Team Secret, a professional Dota 2 team. He won the first International, and was runner-up two years in a row with Natus Vincere.

The 2017 World Orienteering Championships were held in Tartu.

The annual running event Tartu Sügisjooks takes place in Tartu.

== Notable people ==
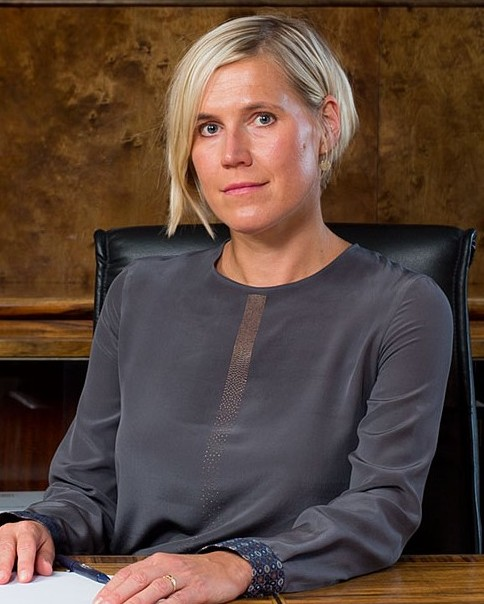
Ülle Madise, 2015

=== Public service ===
- George Browne, (1698–1792), Irish-born Governor of Dorpat.
- Adolf von Harnack (1851–1930), Baltic German lutheran theologian and church historian.
- Adalbert Volck (1868–1948), Baltic German politician
- Haim Fishel Epstein (1874–1942), Lithuanian-American rabbi
- Ants Veetõusme (born 1949), politician (former Mayor of Tartu) and financial figure
- Andrus Ansip (born 1956), politician, former Prime Minister of Estonia
- Alar Karis (born 1958), the 6th President of Estonia
- Jürgen Ligi (born 1959), politician and Govt. minister
- Kersti Kaljulaid (born 1969), 5th President of Estonia
- Ülle Madise (born 1974), 7th President of Estonia

=== Arts ===
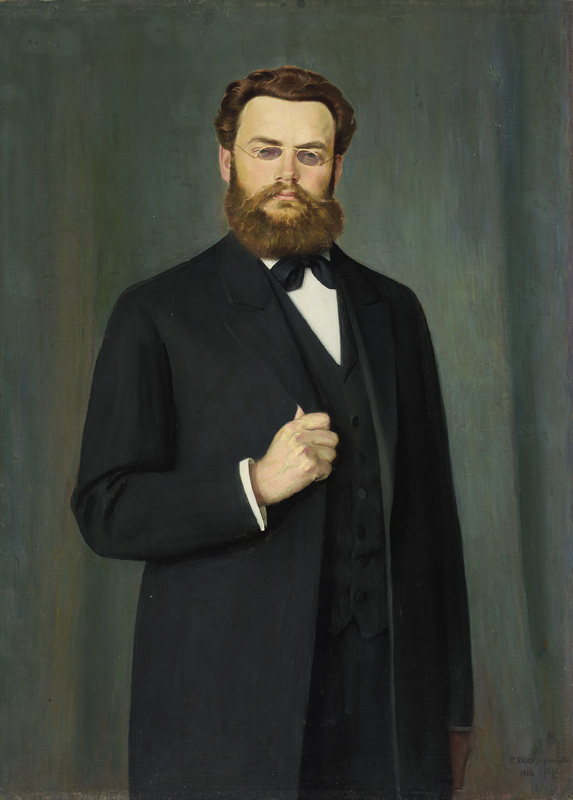
Carl Robert Jakobson

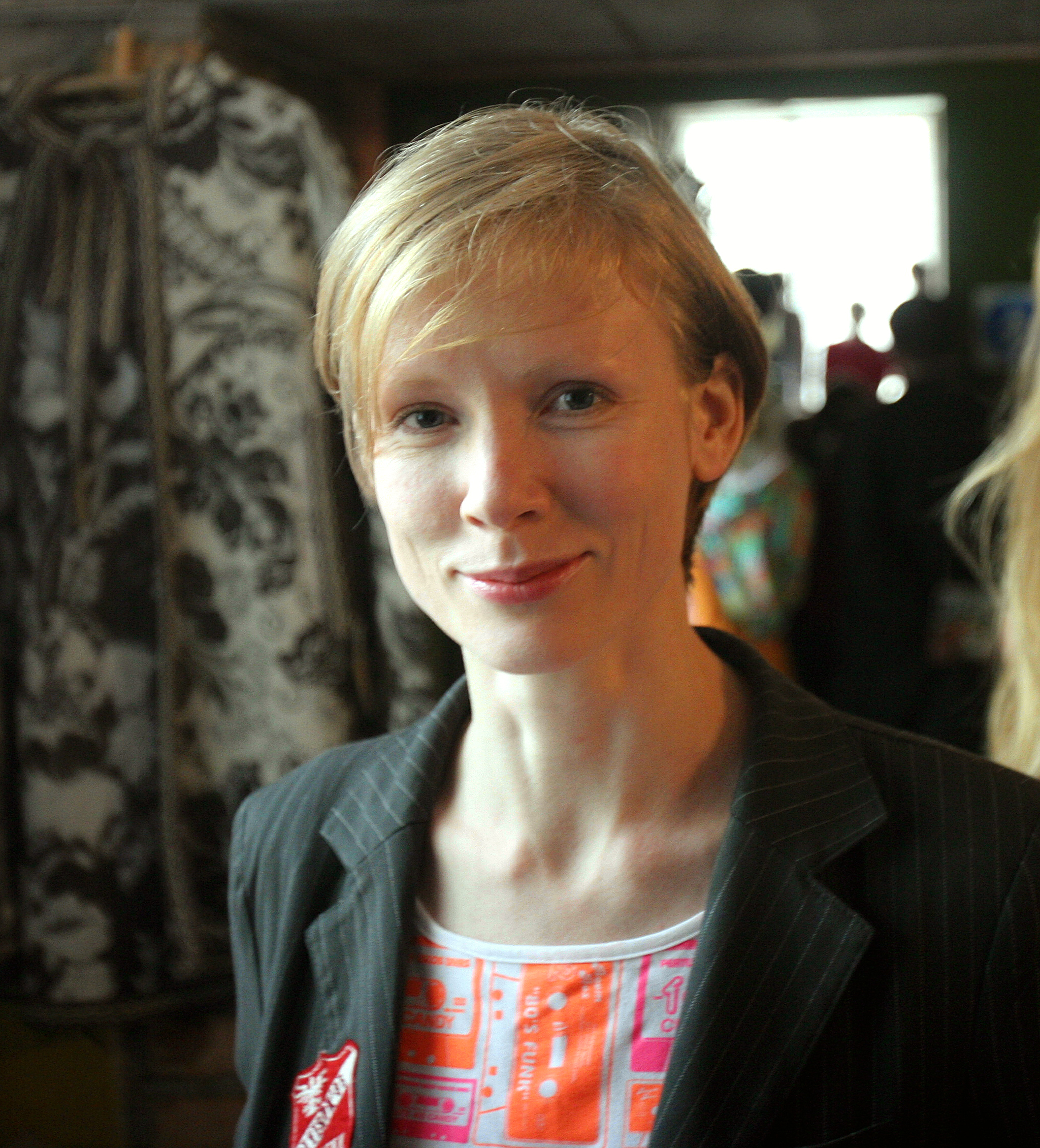
Maarja Jakobson, 2009

- Friedrich Maximilian von Klinger (1752–1831), German dramatist and novelist, wrote, Sturm und Drang (1776), died locally.
- Friedrich Robert Faehlmann (1798–1850), writer, medical doctor and philologist
- Carl Robert Jakobson (1841–1882), writer, politician and teacher.
- Sally von Kügelgen (1860–1928), Baltic German painter
- Hans Dragendorff (1870-1941), Baltic German archaeologist
- Emil Mattiesen (1875–1939), Baltic German composer, pianist and philosopher
- Zofia Romer (1885–1972), Polish painter
- Heino Eller (1887-1970), composer
- Oskar Luts (1887–1953), writer and playwright
- Elsa Ratassepp (1893–1972), actress
- Kallista Kann (1895–1983), linguist
- Else Hueck-Dehio, (1897–1976), Baltic German writer
- Paul Ariste (1905–1990), linguist
- Aino Talvi (1909–1992), actress
- Kai Leete (1910–1995), ballet and folk dancer
- Eno Raud (1928–1996), children's author
- Aarand Roos (1940–2020), linguist, writer and diplomat
- Jaan Kaplinski (1941-2021), poet and philosopher
- Maarja Jakobson (born 1977), actress
- Rasmus Kaljujärv (born 1981), actor
- Eeva Talsi (born 1988), folk musician
- Laura Põldvere (born 1988), singer
- Elisabeth Erm (born 1993), fashion model

=== Science ===
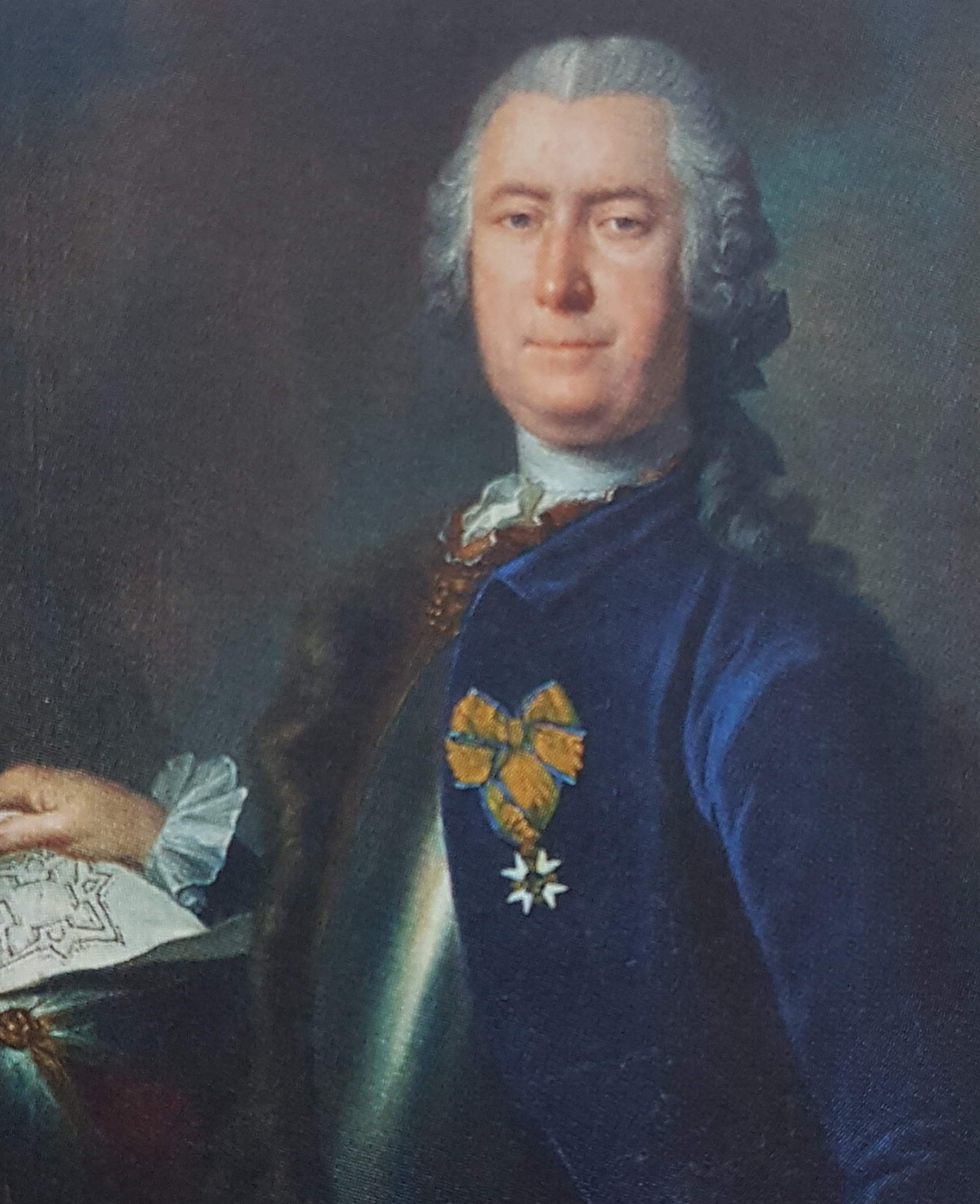
Jacob von Eggers

- Jacob von Eggers (1704-1773), military engineer in Swedish and Saxonian service
- Franz Aepinus (1724–1802), a German mathematician, scientist, and natural philosopher, lived and died locally.
- Karl Ernst von Baer (1792–1876), Baltic German scientist and explorer.
- Johann Friedrich von Eschscholtz (1793–1831), a Baltic German physician, naturalist, and entomologist.
- Karl Ernst Claus (1796–1864), Baltic German chemist and botanist
- Gregor von Helmersen (1803 in Duckershof Manor – 1885), a Baltic German geologist.
- Erhard Schmidt (1876-1959), mathematician
- Peeter Põld (1878–1930), pedagogic scientist, school director and politician
- Leonid Kulik (1883–1942), Russian mineralogist
- Hellmuth Kneser (1898-1973), mathematician
- Alma Johanna Ruubel (1899–1990), mathematician
- Eerik Kumari (1912–1984), biologist and ornithologist
- Jaan Einasto (born 1929), astrophysicist
- Mart-Olav Niklus (1934–2025), ornithologist, dissident, and politician
- Jaak Aaviksoo (born 1954), physicist, politician and former rector of the University of Tartu

=== Sport ===
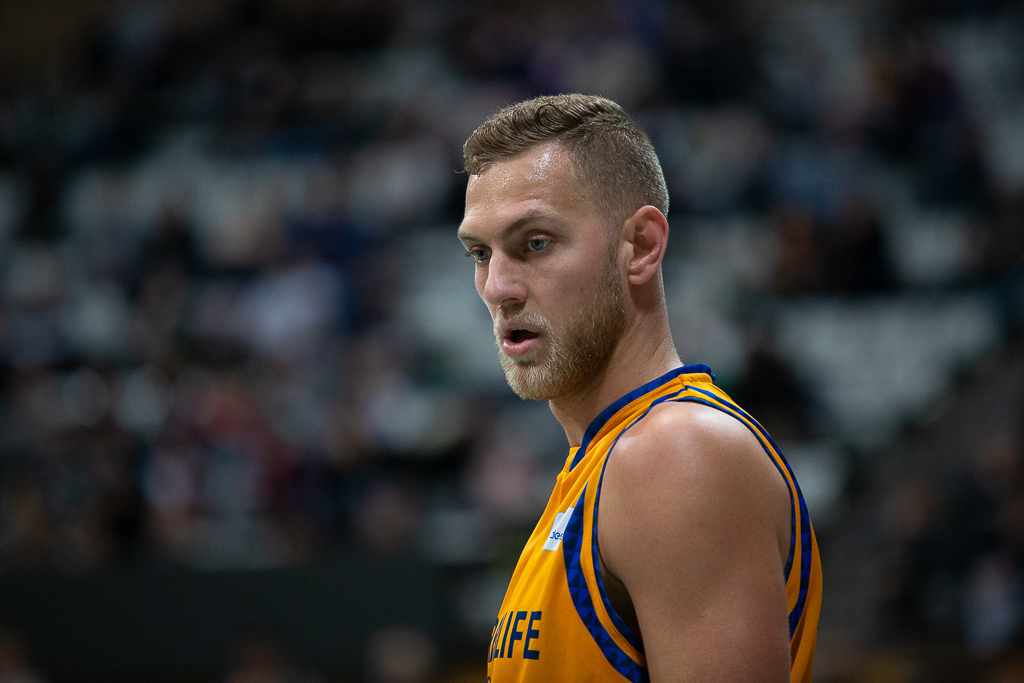
Siim-Sander Vene, 2019

- George Hackenschmidt (1877–1968), strongman, professional wrestler, writer and philosopher
- Lauri Aus (1970–2003), professional road cyclist
- Markko Märtin (born 1975), rally driver
- Kristina Šmigun-Vähi (born 1977), cross-country skier
- Jaan Mölder (born 1987), rally driver
- Martin Järveoja (born 1987), rally co-driver
- Rein Taaramäe (born 1987), professional road cyclist
- Siim-Sander Vene (born 1990), basketball player
- Julia Beljajeva (born 1992), fencer
- Kerr Kriisa (born 2001), basketball player
- Eneli Jefimova (born 2006), swimmer

== Twin towns – sister cities ==
Tartu is twinned with:

- Tampere, Finland
- Turku, Finland
- Hämeenlinna, Finland
- Uppsala, Sweden
- Veszprém, Hungary
- Kaunas, Lithuania
- Frederiksberg, Denmark
- Zutphen and Deventer, Netherlands
- Hafnarfjörður, Iceland
- Bærum, Norway
- Lüneburg, Germany
- Ferrara, Italy
- Salisbury, Maryland, United States
- Riga, Latvia
- Lviv, Ukraine

== Gallery ==
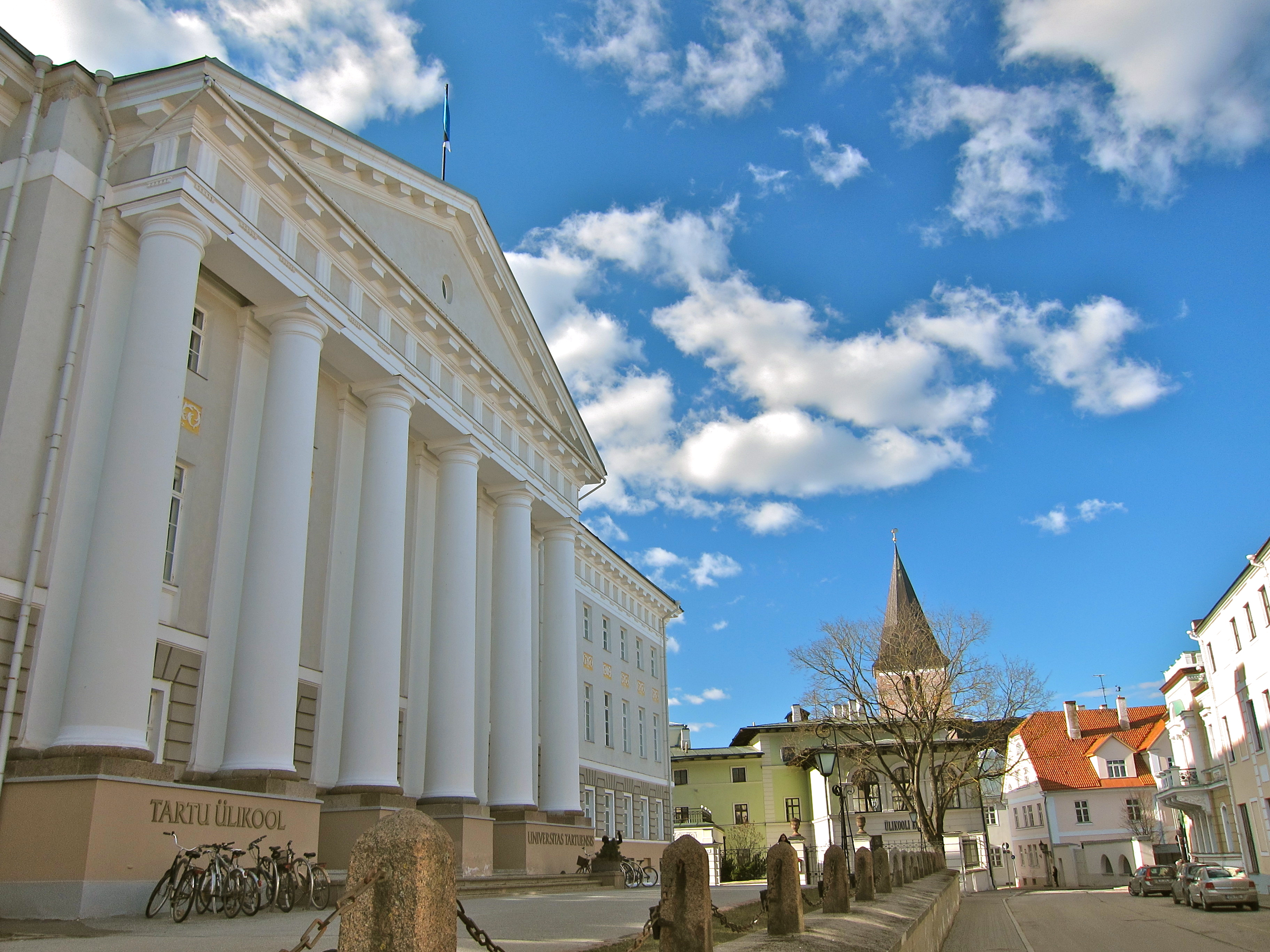
University of Tartu main building

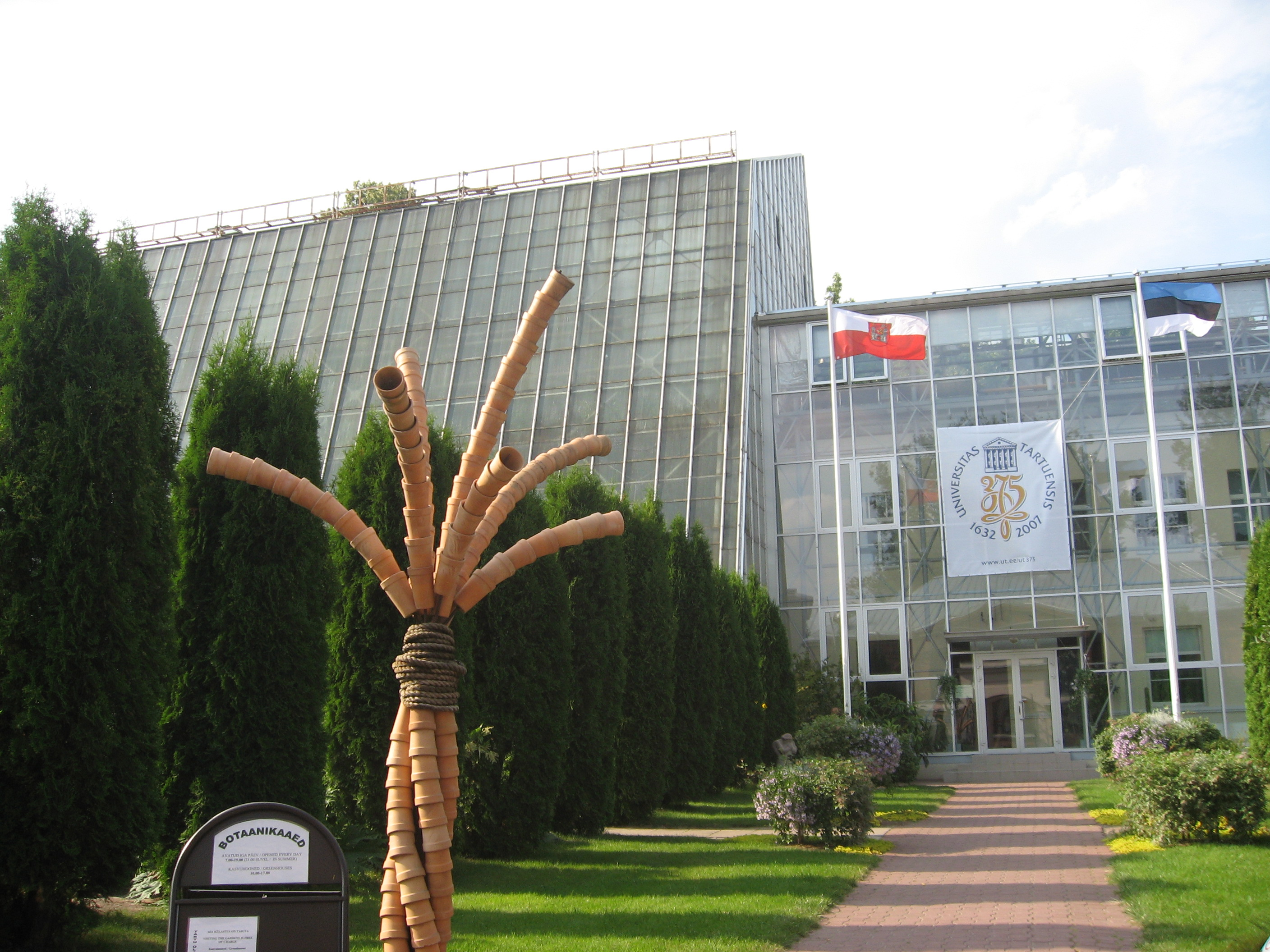
University of Tartu Botanical Gardens

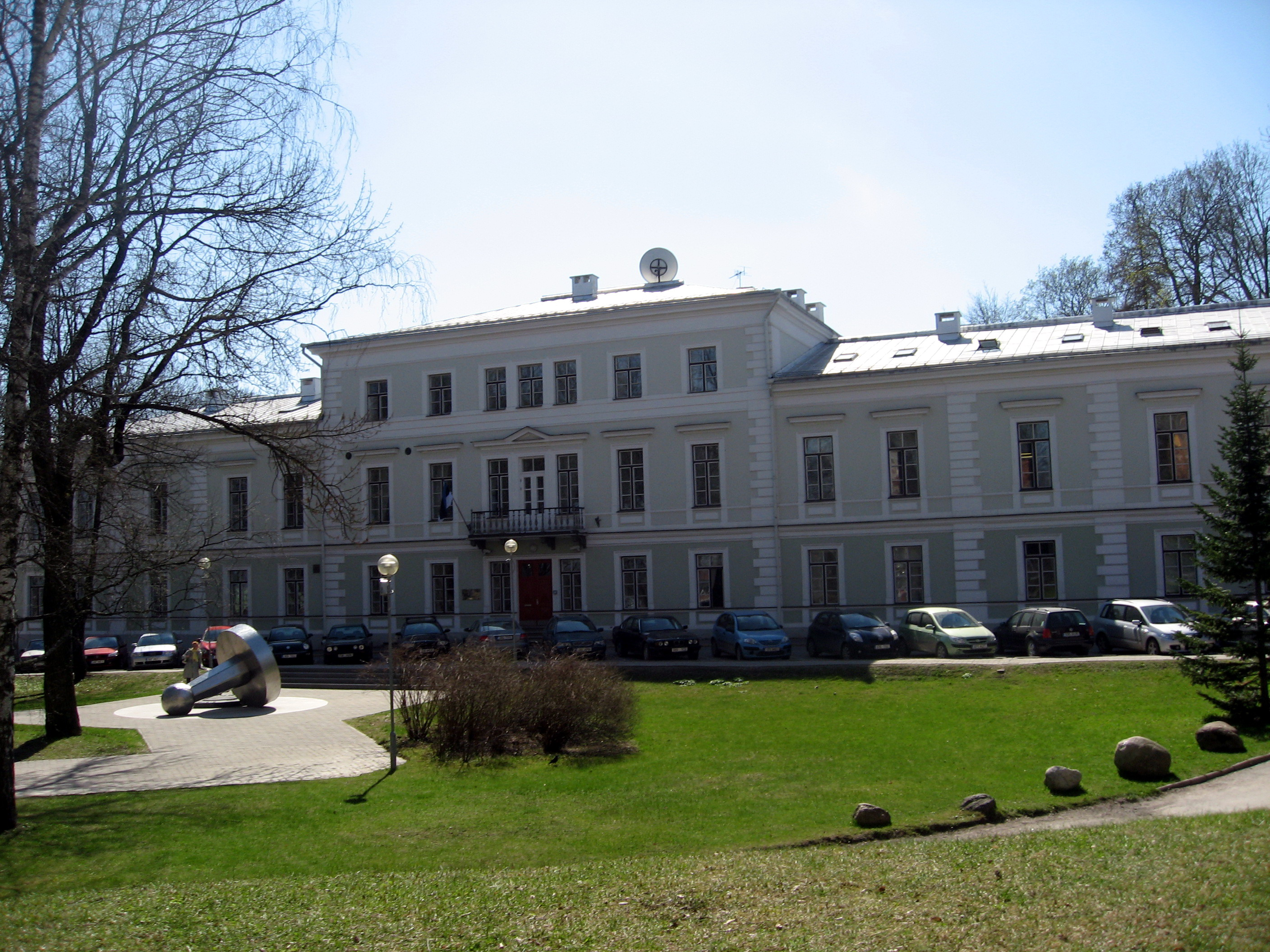
The Supreme Court of Estonia

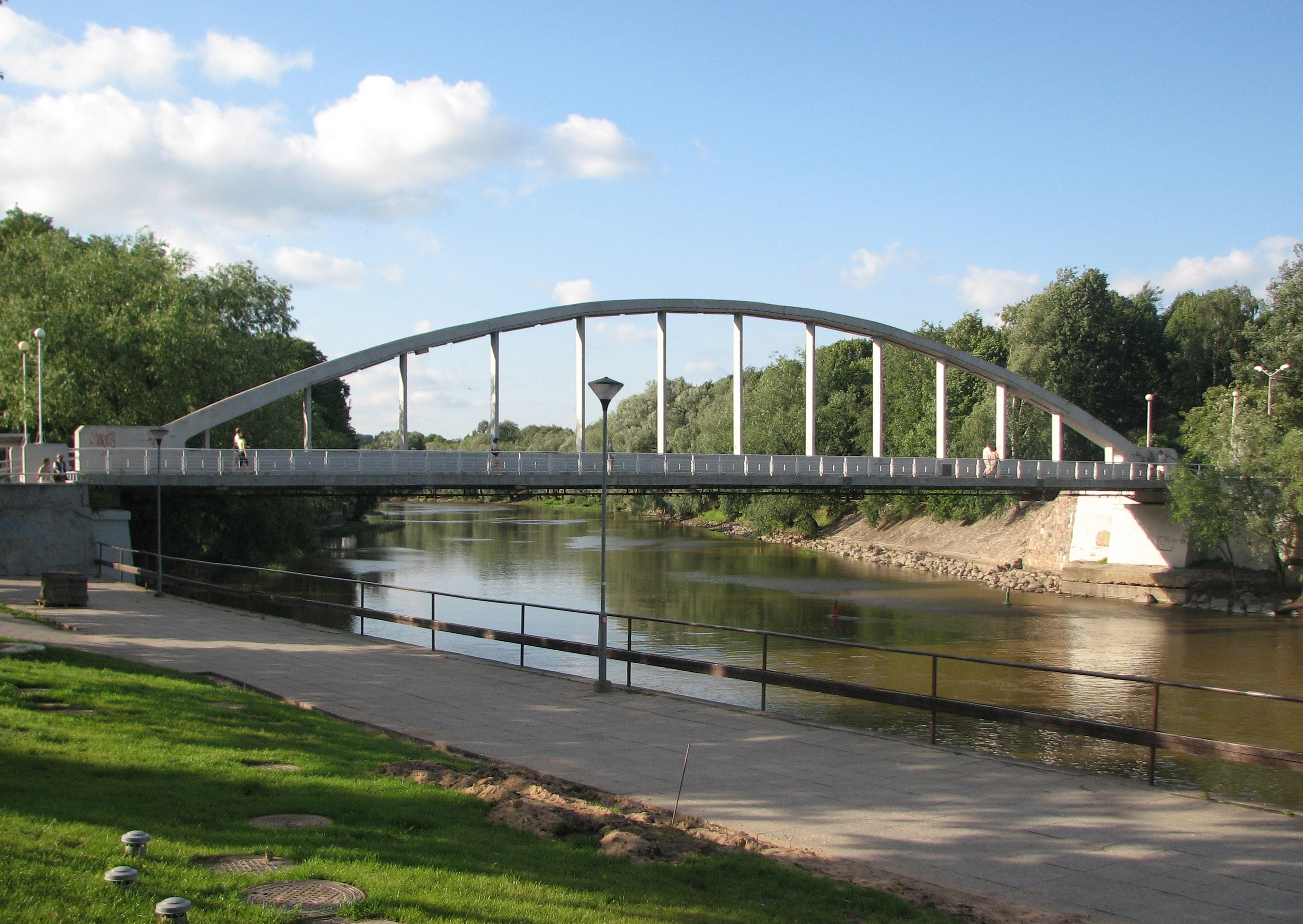
Kaarsild (Arch Bridge) over the Emajõgi

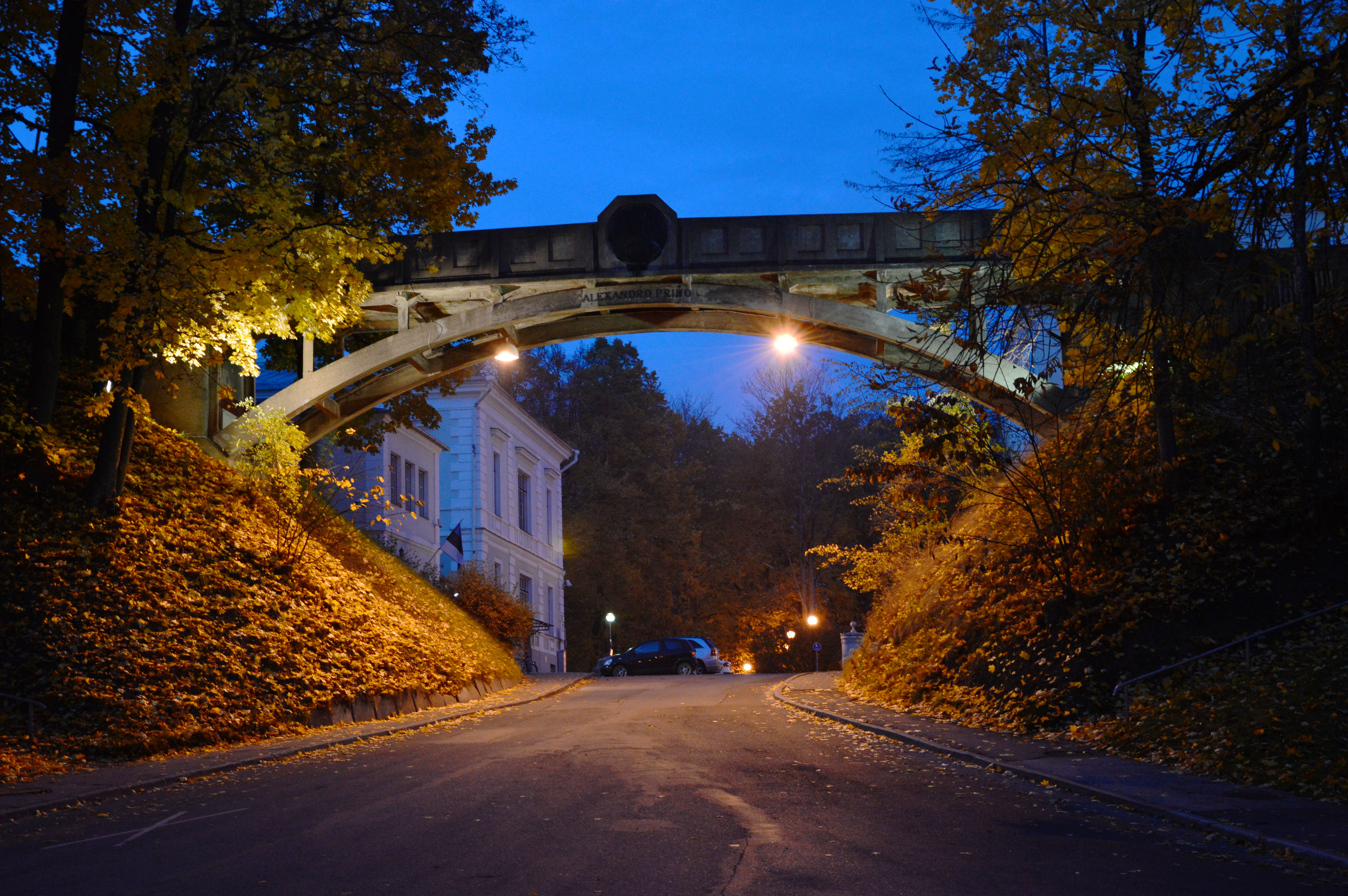
Kuradisild (Devil's Bridge)

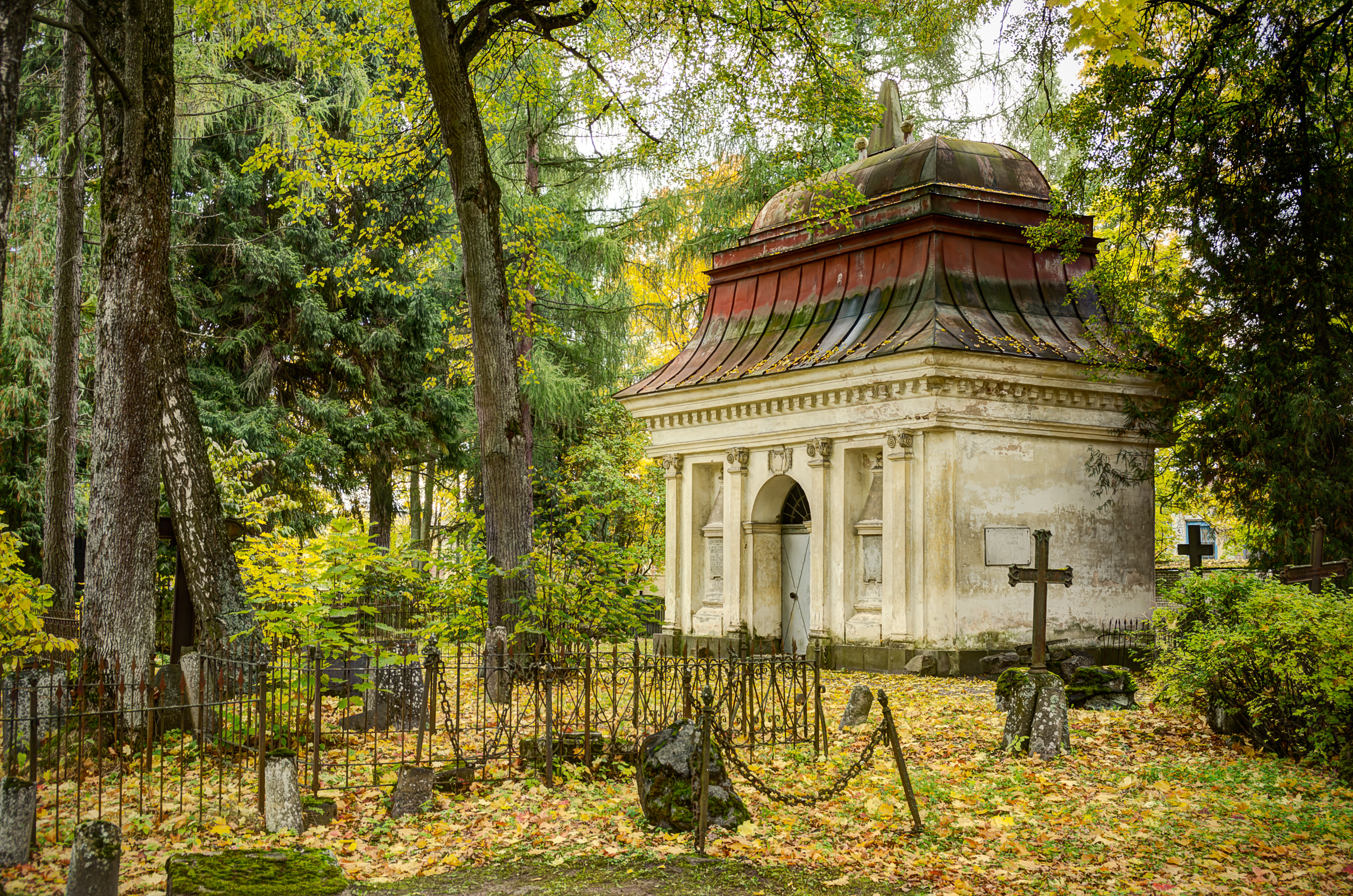
Teller chapel in Tartu, Estonia. Built in 1794

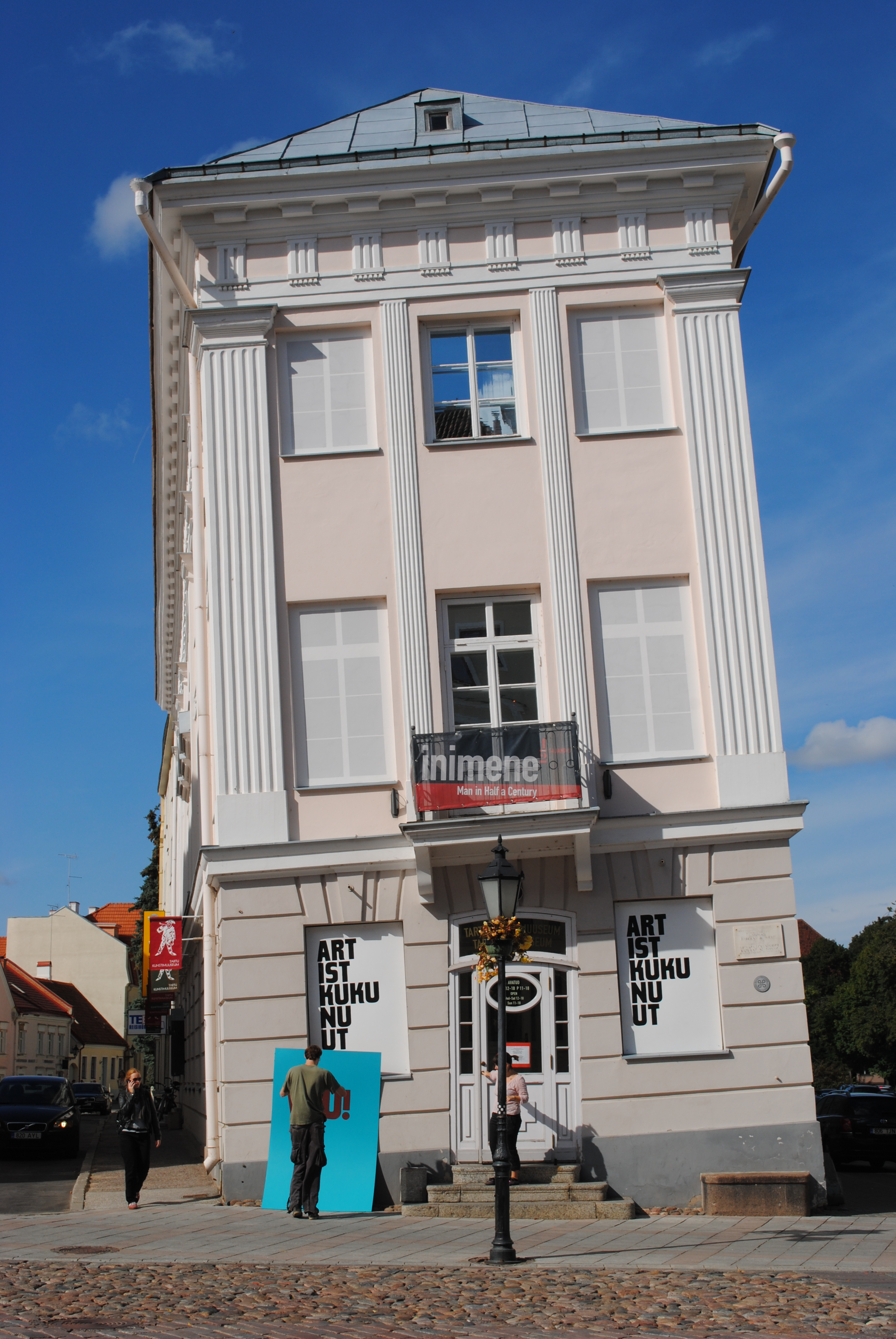
Tartu Art Museum

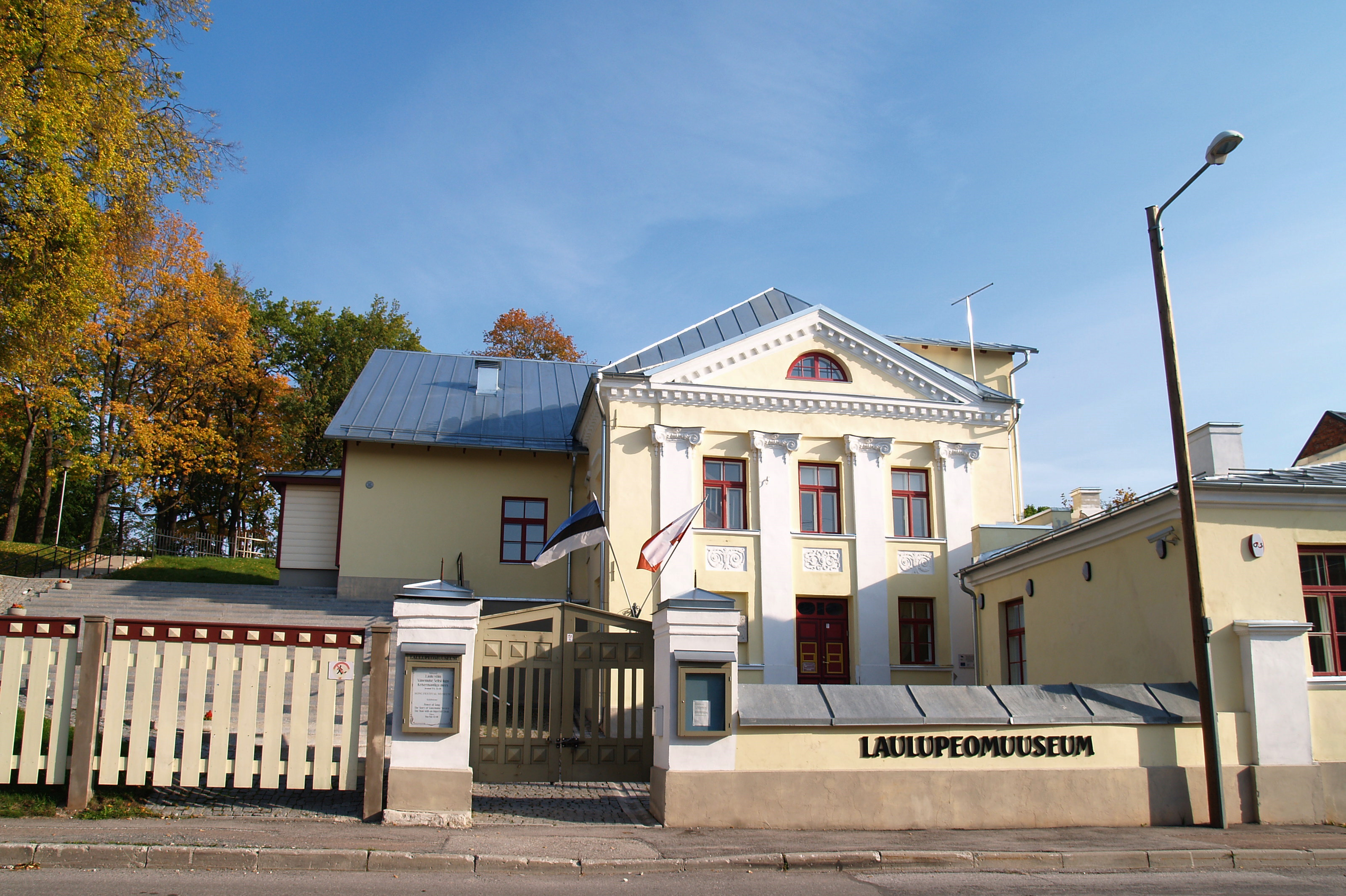
Song Festival Museum

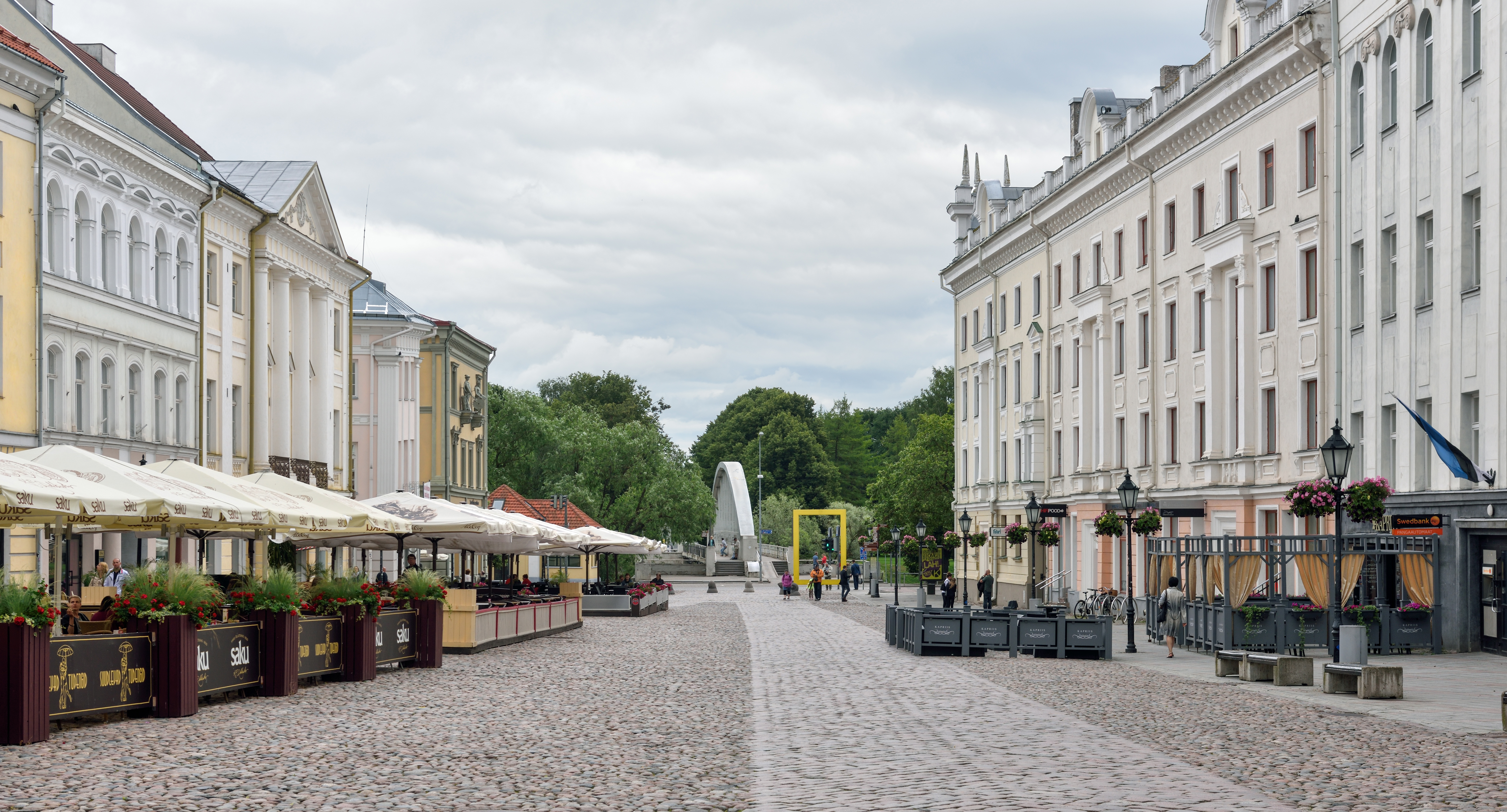
Tartu Town Hall Square

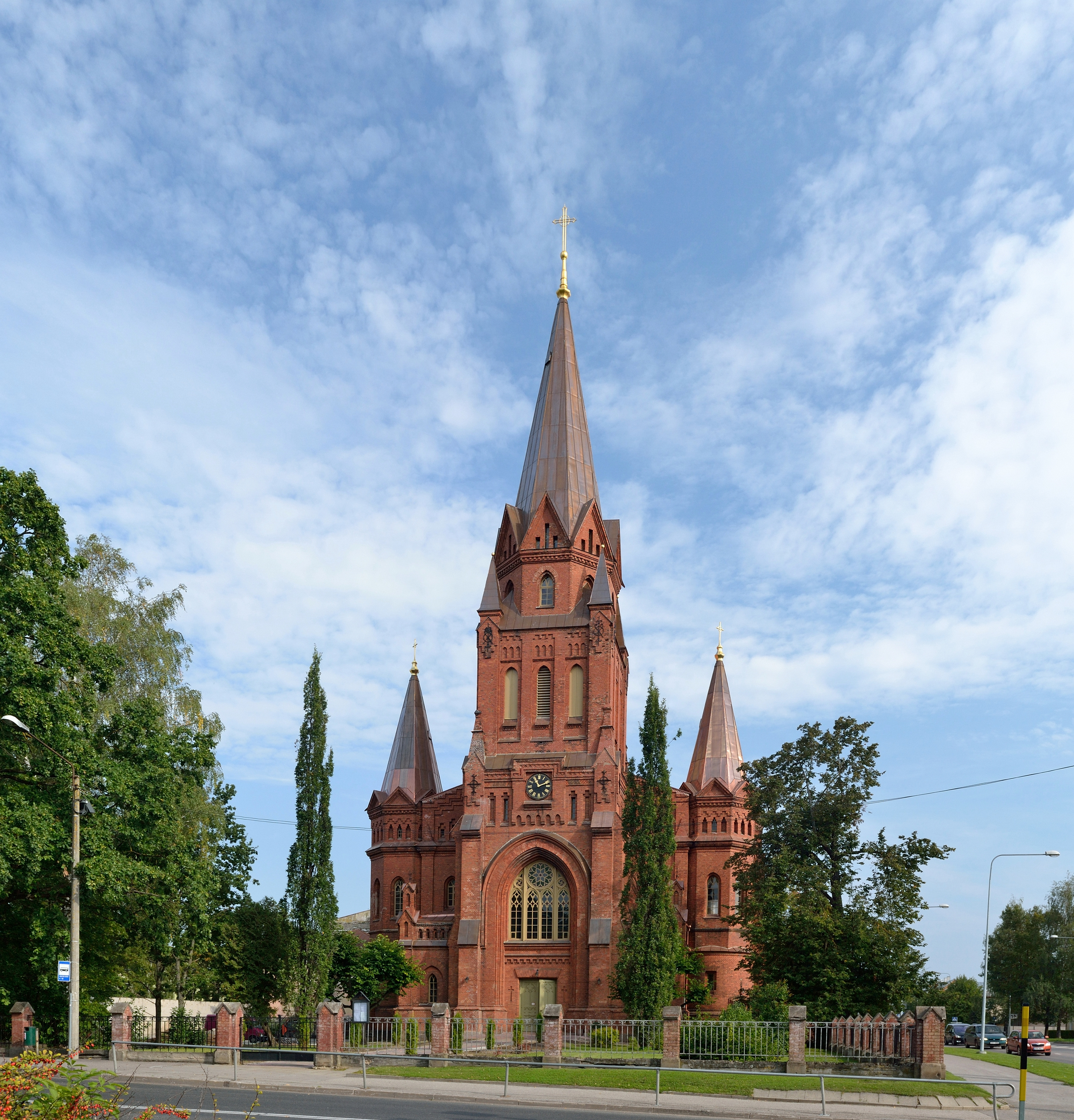
St Peter's Church

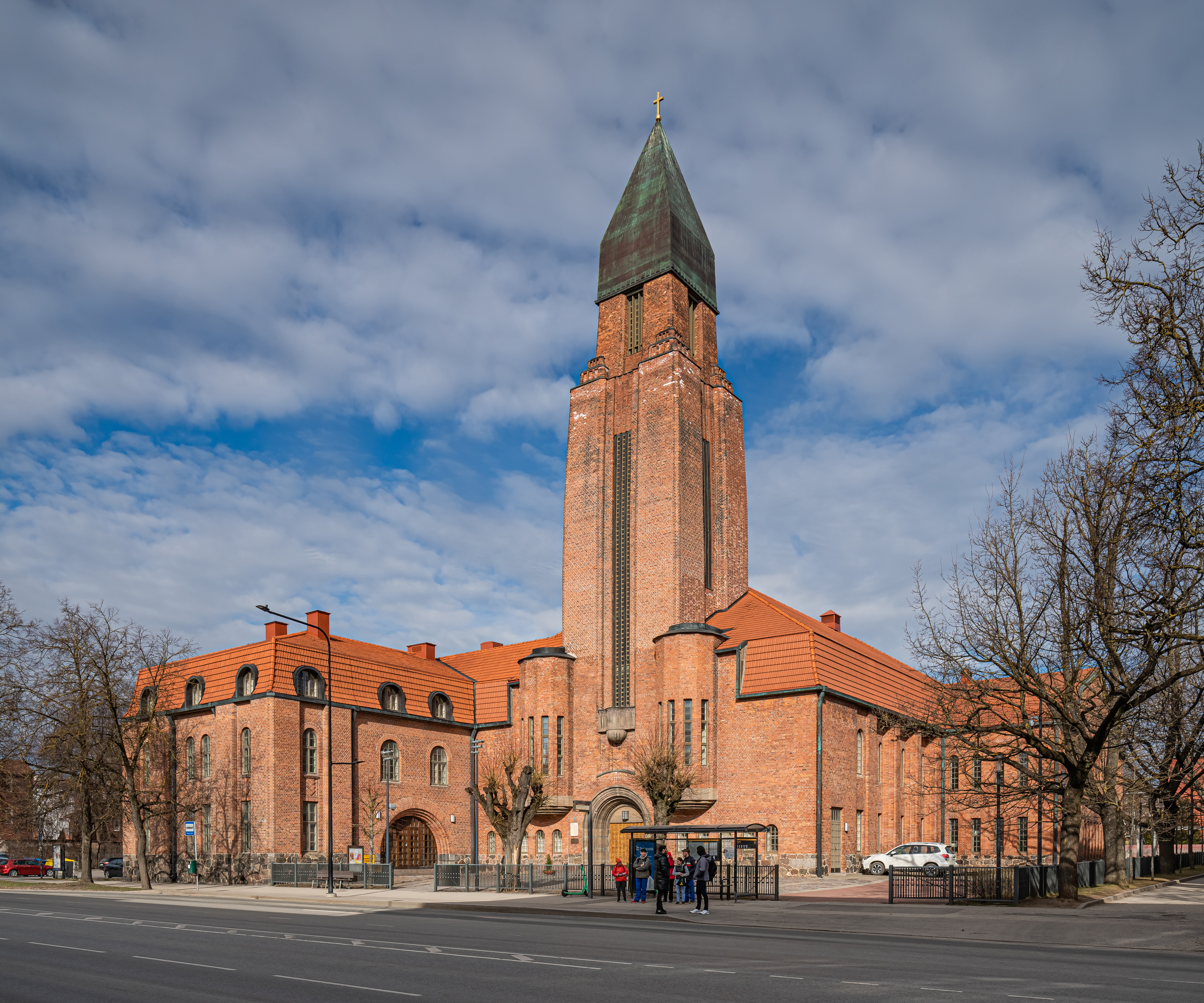
St Paul's Church

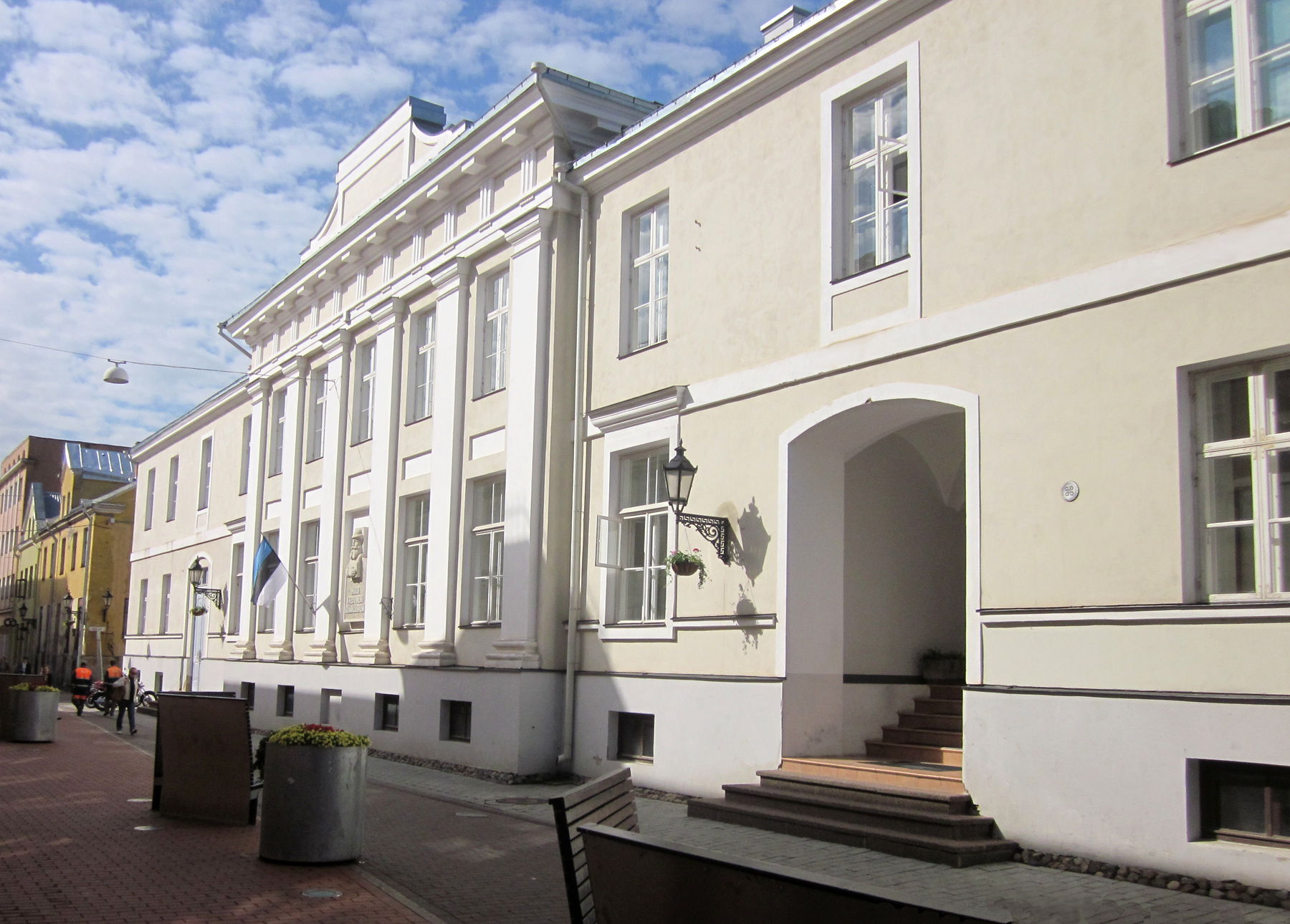
Hugo Treffner Gymnasium

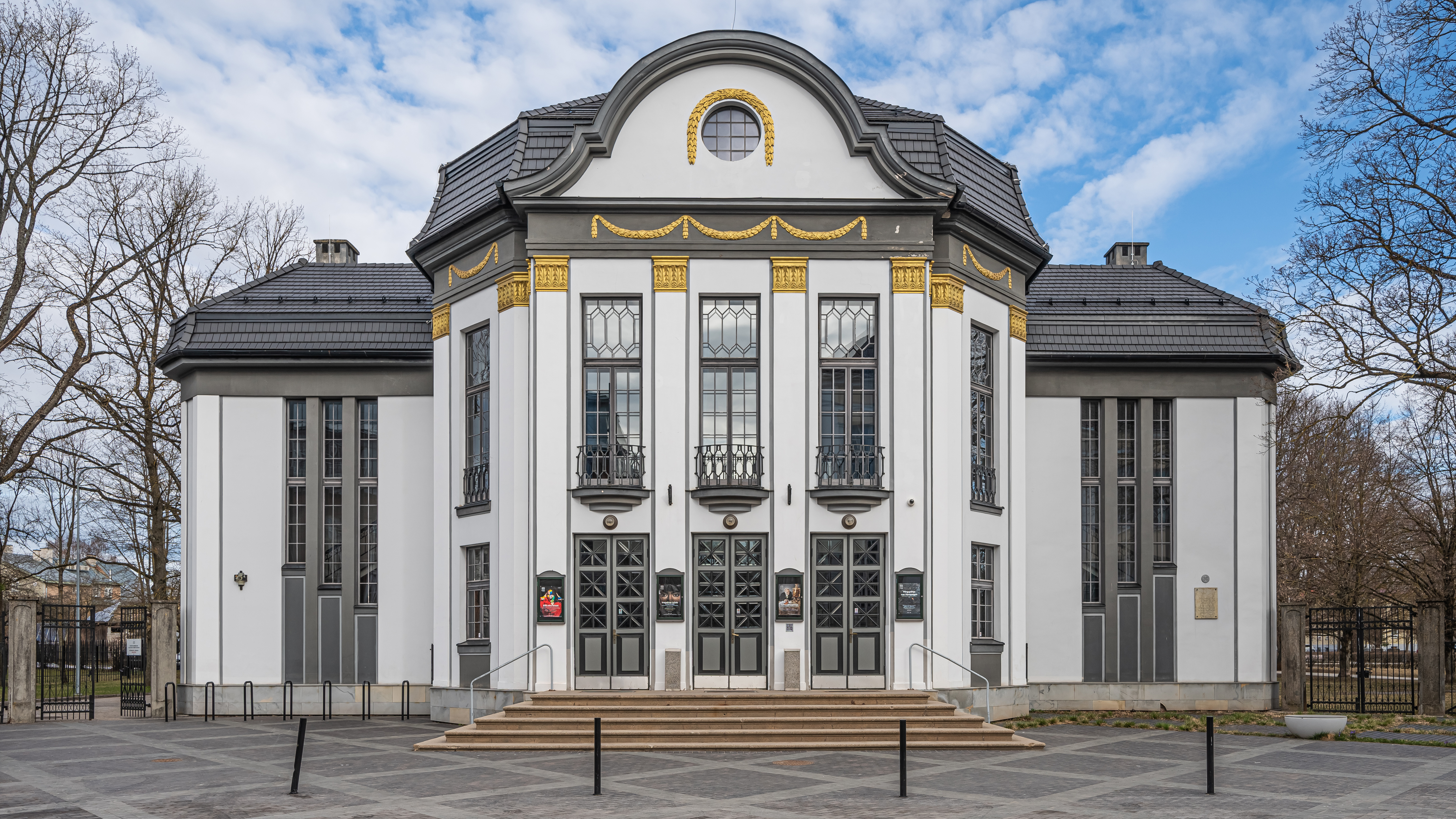
"Little House" of the Vanemuine theatre

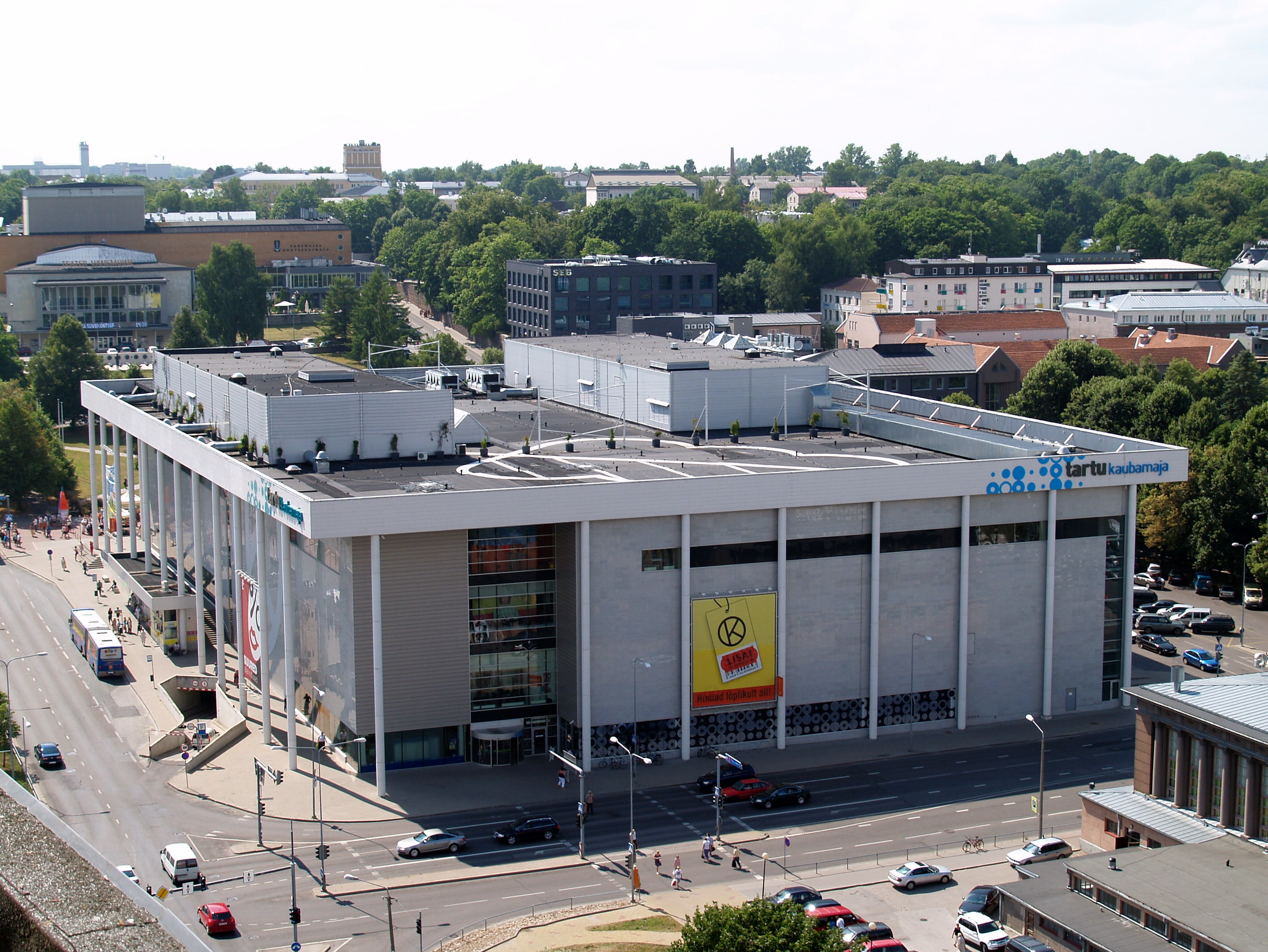
Tartu Department Store

Tasku Shopping Centre

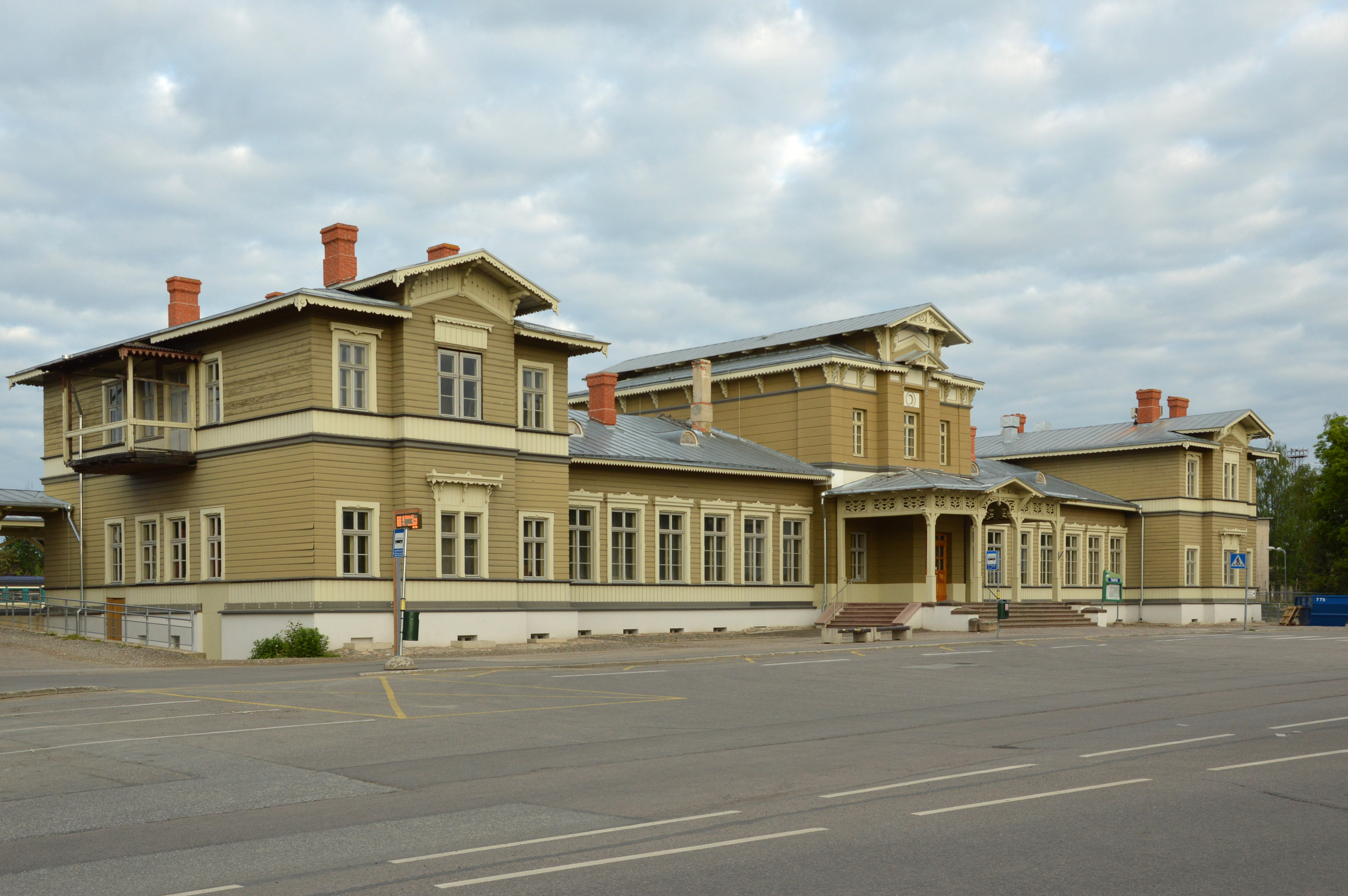
Tartu railway station

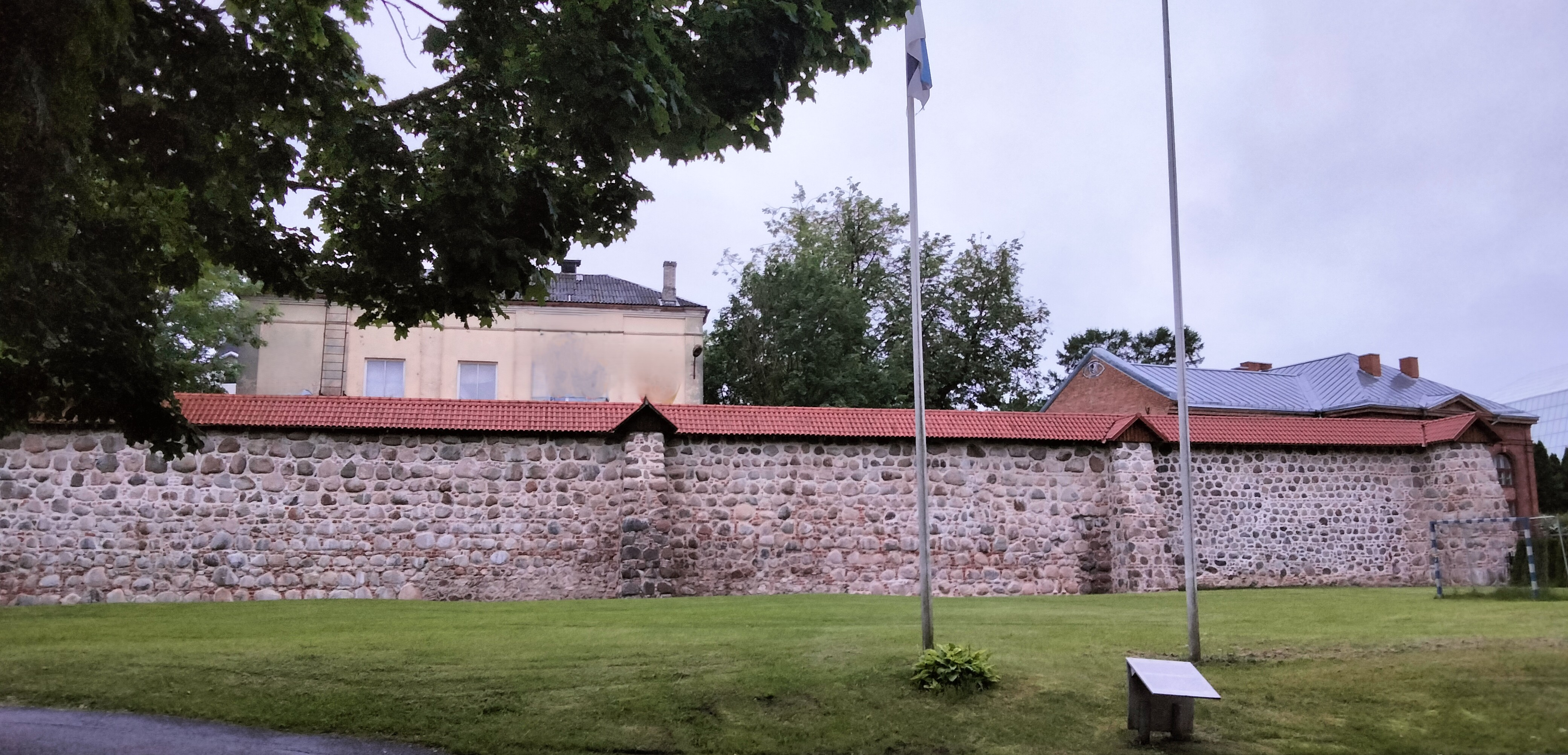
Part of the medieval city wall, seen from Vabaduse Street

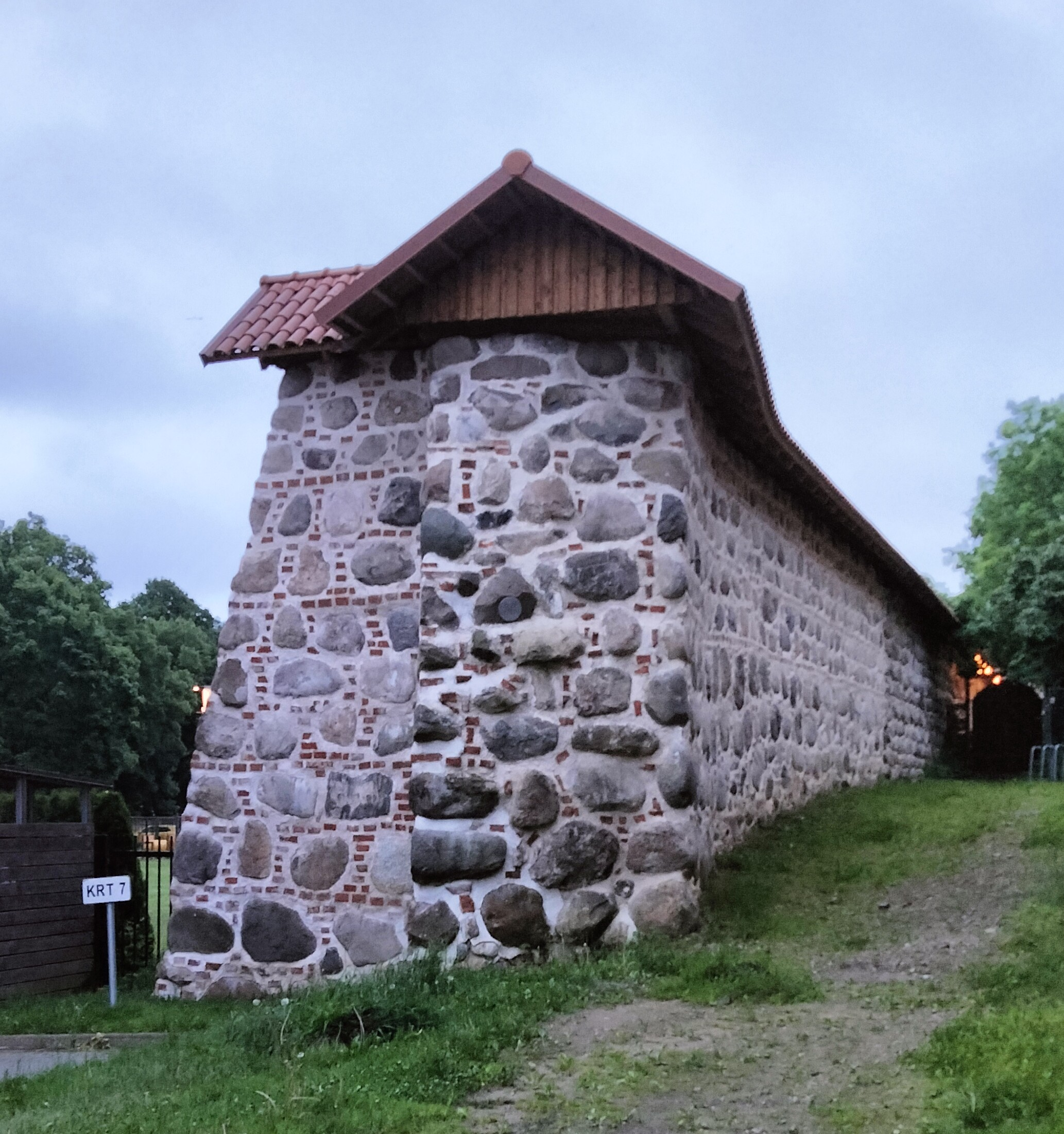
Part of the medieval city wall, seen from Lai Street

== See also ==
- Immaculate Conception Church, Tartu
- University of Tartu
  - Tartu University Library
- St Mary's Church, Tartu
- St Paul's Church, Tartu
- St Peter's Church, Tartu

== Sources ==
- Bernotas, Rivo (2011). "Medieval Town Wall of Tartu in the Light of Recent Research" (PDF). Estonian Journal of Archaeology. No. 1.

== Notes ==
=== Further reading ===
- Villem Raam (1999). Eesti arhitektuur 4. Tartumaa, Jõgevamaa, Valgamaa, Võrumaa, Põlvamaa. Valgus (in Estonian). Valgus. ISBN 9985-68-050-2.
- Malle Salupere (2004). Tuhandeaastane Tartu – Nooruse ja heade mõtete linn (in Estonian). University of Tartu Press. ISBN 9985-56-908-3.
- Seppo Zetterberg (2007). Viron historia (in Finnish). Finnish Literature Society. ISBN 978-951-746-520-5.
