= Siege of Fellin (1560) =

Siege in Estonia

- Part of the Livonian War
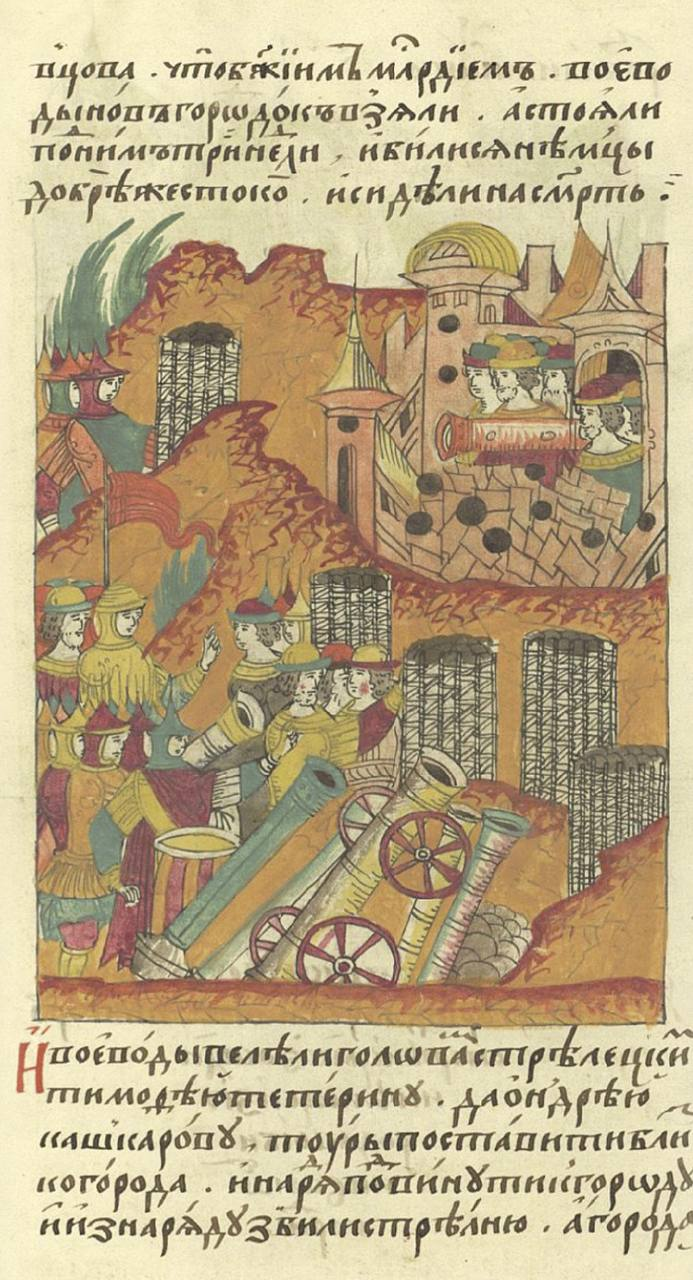
- Episode of the siege of the Livonian fortress by a Russian detachment, miniature from Illustrated Chronicle of Ivan the Terrible
Date	17–20 August 1560
Location	Fellin, Livonian Confederation (Present-day Estonia)
Result	Russian victory

Belligerents
Tsardom of Russia	Livonian Confederation

Commanders and leaders
Ivan Mstislavsky; Andrey Kurbsky	Wilhelm von Fürstenberg (surrendered)

The siege of Fellin was one of the final events that took place in August 1560 during the Russo-Livonian War. Besiegers used artillery fire exclusively to capture the strong fortress.

In July 1560, the Russian army marched on the Fellin fortress, the Livonian knights tried to resist it in the field, but they were defeated in the battle of Erms. On 17 August, the fortress was besieged and after three days of "hellish" shelling, it surrendered. As a result of this siege, the entire Livonian order actually disintegrated and was divided between its closest neighbors - Lithuanians, Poles, Swedes and Russians.

== Background ==
At the end of July, the Muscovites embarked on another campaign in Livonia. These troops were commanded by Ivan Mstislavsky, one of Ivan the Terrible's closest confidants, and Andrei Kurbsky, who would become famous later by betraying the tsar and siding with the Lithuanians. There will later be a heated debate in the form of correspondence between old friends. The German garrison was commanded by Wilhelm von Fürstenberg. The fortress was considered completely impregnable, but Russian artillery had already destroyed its walls in 1481. During campaign Germans tried to prevent them in a field battle, the Russian vanguard under the command of Prince Vasily Barbashev at Erms collided with the Livonians under Philipp Bell and completely defeated them, the way to the fortress was open. 261 knights died, a significant part were captured, with this in mind, the losses of the Livonians can reach 500 people.

== Siege ==
The cavalrymen from the vanguard, veterans of the battle of Ermes, were the first to approach the castle. Due to their lack of artillery, they only blocked the approaches to the castle and looted Surrounding area, waiting for the main troops. The siege did not last long, a couple of days, on the first day of August 17, the Russians brought down part of the walls, and the next day there was a massive fire that destroyed most of the supplies, a mutiny began in the garrison, which was barely suppressed, but this put an end to the resistance - on August 20, the city surrendered. According to the Livonians, the Russians entered the city with a "triumph", celebrating an important victory that came with almost no losses. Many accused the former master of having surrendered the city to the Russians, but he himself did not admit this, adding in justification that he had "only 300 people who had sympathies for Russia." The estimate of the strength of the garrison can probably be considered underestimated. The fall of the city actually led to the collapse of Livonia, and the beginning of a race between Sweden, Lithuania, Poland and Russia for who would have time to occupy more land.

== Aftermath ==
After the fall of the city, the Russian offensive continued, with the seaside town of Paide as the main focus. Despite the fact that the tsar ordered the main forces to move towards Reval, Prince Mstislavsky chose another, more promising path in his opinion. The siege proceeded sluggishly, the commandant of the Oldenbock fortress understood that the Russians would not be able to support themselves for a long time in the fall due to bad roads, which prevented the supply of food, and the surrounding area was devastated. Mstislavsky, not wanting to spoil the effect of two brilliant victories earlier, could not retreat just like that, so he began the siege. The whole month of bombing was fruitless, unlike Fellin, the Paide Garrison had much more patience. Finally, on October 15, the Muscovites went all in and began storming the fortress, they broke into the city itself, but fell into a series of ambushes from fortified positions, suffered heavy losses and retreated. On October 18, the siege was lifted and the Russians fell back in order. At the same time, a small Russian detachment set up camp near Revel, the locals and the knights decided to attack it and crushed the small vanguard, capturing the trophies. Livonian sources claim 600 people were killed, while Russians claimed 15. However, the next day, the main forces of the muscovites descended on the rejoicing residents of the city, who took full revenge and killed the local militia. Livonian chronicles report the death of 60 Reval residents, calling the action a "massacre", there were hardly more Russians than the Germans opposing them, but experience and training were clearly on their side. A year later, seeing how the neighbors were seizing the outskirts of collapsed Livonia, Ivan the Terrible planned a major raid on Riga, which proved successful, exerting a moral influence on the Lithuanians and Swedes. In general, after the fall of Fellin, Russian expansion in Livonia came to a logical end, which is confirmed by some failures under Paide, they could not take the remaining largest coastal cities.
