= Battle of Ērģeme =

1560 military conflict in Estonia during Livonian War

- Part of the Livonian War
Date	2 August 1560
Location	Ērģeme, near Valga, Livonia (now Latvia) 57°48′20″N 25°48′57″E
Result	Russian victory
Territorial changes	The Livonian Confederation lost its ability to wage offensive war

Belligerents
Livonian Confederation	Tsardom of Russia

Commanders and leaders
Philipp Schall von Bell (POW)	Vasily Ivanovich Barbashin

Strength
330 to 500 knights 500 cavalrymen	1,000 cavalrymen

Casualties and losses
261 to 500 killed and captured	?

The Battle of Ērģeme (also Battle of Ermes) (Estonian: Härgmäe lahing; German: Schlacht bei Ermes; Russian: Битва под Эрмесом; Latvian: Ērģemes kauja) was fought on 2 August 1560 in present-day Latvia (near Valka) as part of the Livonian War between the forces of Ivan IV of Russia and the Livonian Confederation. It was the last battle fought by the German knights in Livonia and an important Russian victory. The knights were defeated so thoroughly that the Order reduced to only defending its fortresses, unable to fight in open battles.

== Battle ==
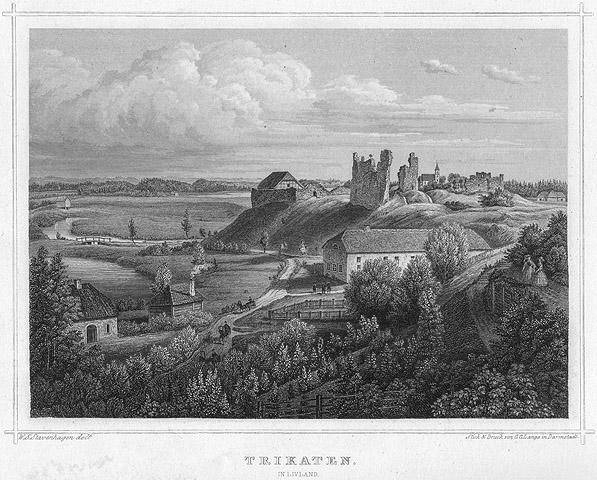
Trikāta Castle, near the camp of the Livonian Confederation forces

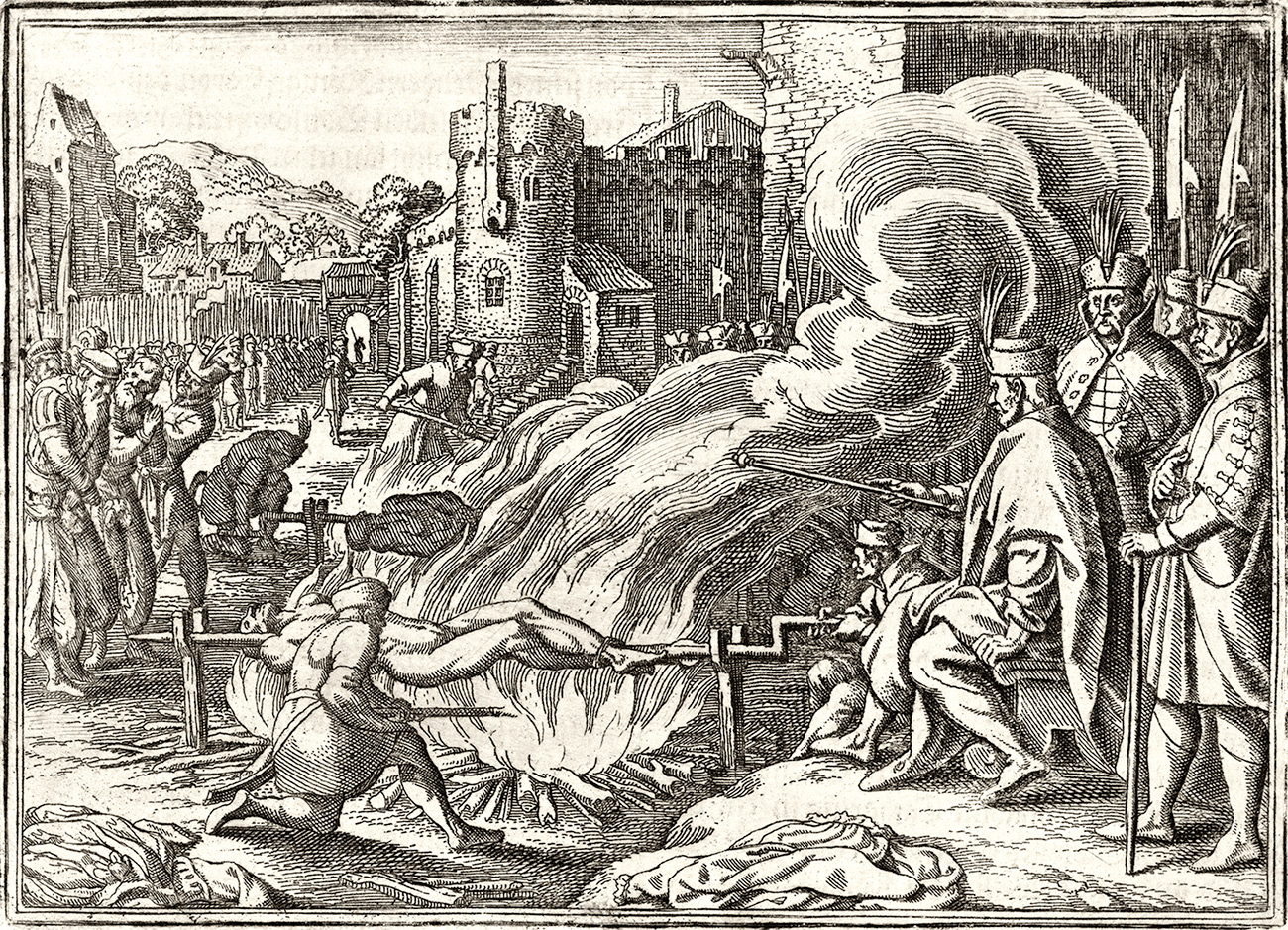
Ivan the Terrible tortures his rivals in Livonia

Troops of the Livonian Confederation under the command of Philipp Schall von Bell – the Land Marshal of the Livonian Order and the Commander of Riga – gathered near the settlement of Trikāta to repel the Russian forces invading Livonia. On August 2, thirty knights set off to collect fodder within a distance of about 27 km from their camp. On the other side of the river they suddenly came across a Russian guard of 500 men. Both sides opened fire; as a result of the skirmish, one Russian was killed and the rest retreated across the meadow to the main army, alerting them. Eighteen Livonian knights turned back for reinforcements, and twelve stayed behind to pursue the retreating enemy. As soon as they saw Russia's main force, they also turned back and rode back to the camp to alert the commanders, losing several people in the process. When the first group arrived at the camp, Philip von Bell ordered his 300 horsemen to attack the Russians, expecting to find approximately 500 of them. Initially, the knights successfully trampled a Russian outpost and drove the retreating enemy to the latter's main units, only to find themselves unexpectedly surrounded on all sides.

Barbashin's main forces had no more than 1,000 at their disposal, although Prince Kurbsky called the number at 12,000, modern historians find these figures overstated.

In the battle with the main forces, many German soldiers and mercenaries were killed or taken prisoner. Those who still remained in the Trikāta camp fled. The German chronicle estimates the total losses of the German knights at 261 people. Among the prisoners was Land Marshal Philip von Bell himself, who was considered "the last hope of Livonia", and 10 more commanders. There is no information about the number of Russians killed, but it was said that it took them 14 carts to take their dead to the place where the corpses were burned. In Moscow captivity, Philip von Belle was questioned by Ivan the Terrible, but the Land Marshal's insolent and haughty answers infuriated the Tzar. Ivan the Terrible ordered Philip von Bell executed along with his most senior commanders, including his brother, Werner Schall von Bell (Komtur of Goldingen). Some of the remaining prisoners were either executed or oholopleny (lit. "peasantified", i.e. forced to stay in Russia as serfs); there is no credible source on their numbers.

The sole survivor among the high-ranking prisoners of the war, the Bishop of Dorpat Hermann II Wesel, who had been captured in 1558, somehow retained the Tzar's favor and was allowed to bury the dead outside of town in accordance with the manner of the Catholic faith.
