= Tartu Cathedral =

Church building in Tartu, Estonia

Coordinates: 58°22′48.7″N 26°42′54″E

- Estonian: Tartu toomkirik, German: Dorpater Domkirche
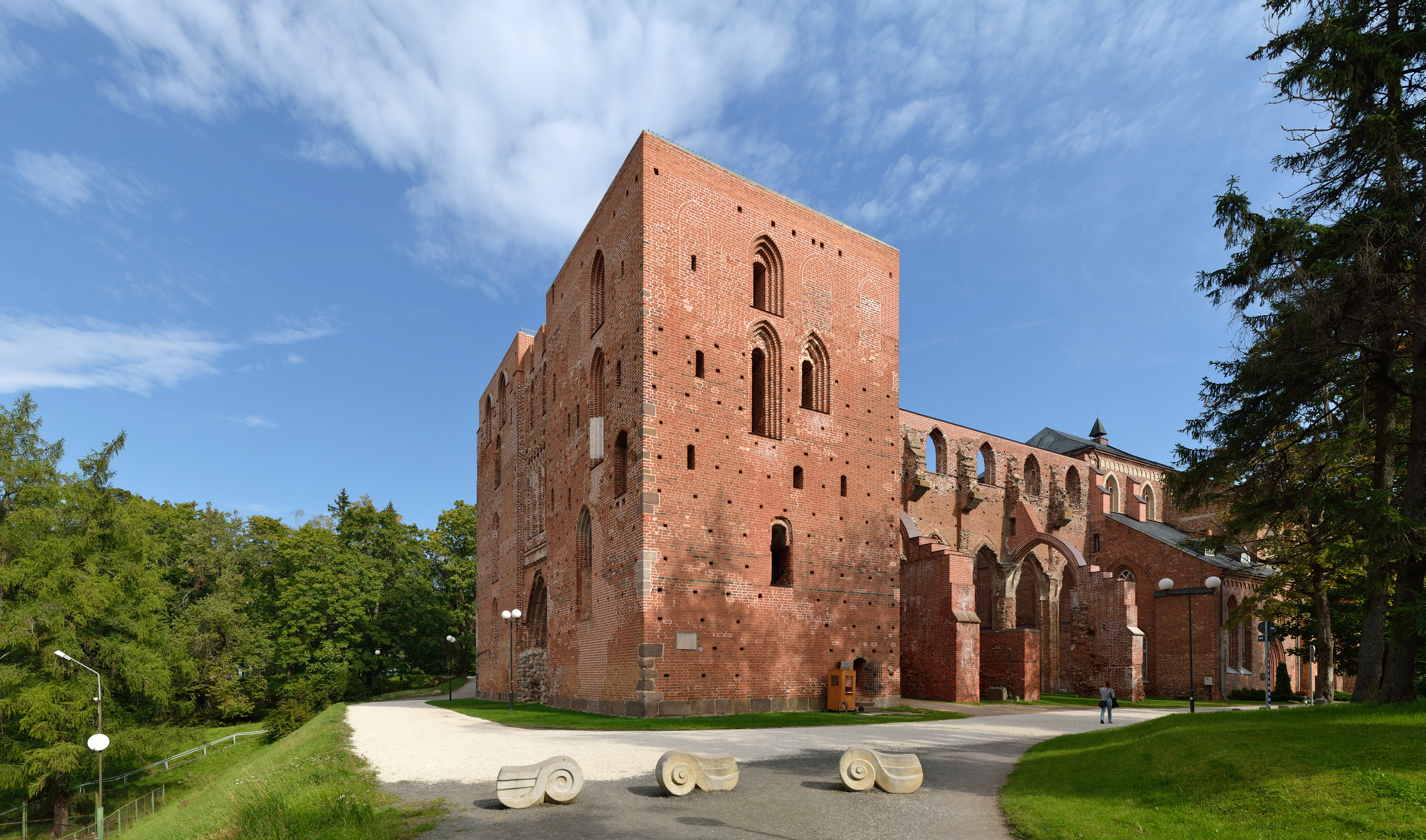
- Tartu Cathedral
- Location: Kesklinn, Tartu, Tartu County
- Country: Estonia
- Previous denomination: Catholic

History
- Status: Museum, Ruins
- Founder: Hermann of Dorpat
- Dedication: Saint Peter and Paul the Apostle

Architecture
- Functional status: deconsecrated
- Heritage designation: Architectural monument of Estonia
- Style: Brick Gothic
- Groundbreaking: 13th century
- Completed: 16th century

Specifications
- Height: 66 m (216 ft 6 in)
- Materials: Brick

Administration
- Diocese: Bishopric of Dorpat

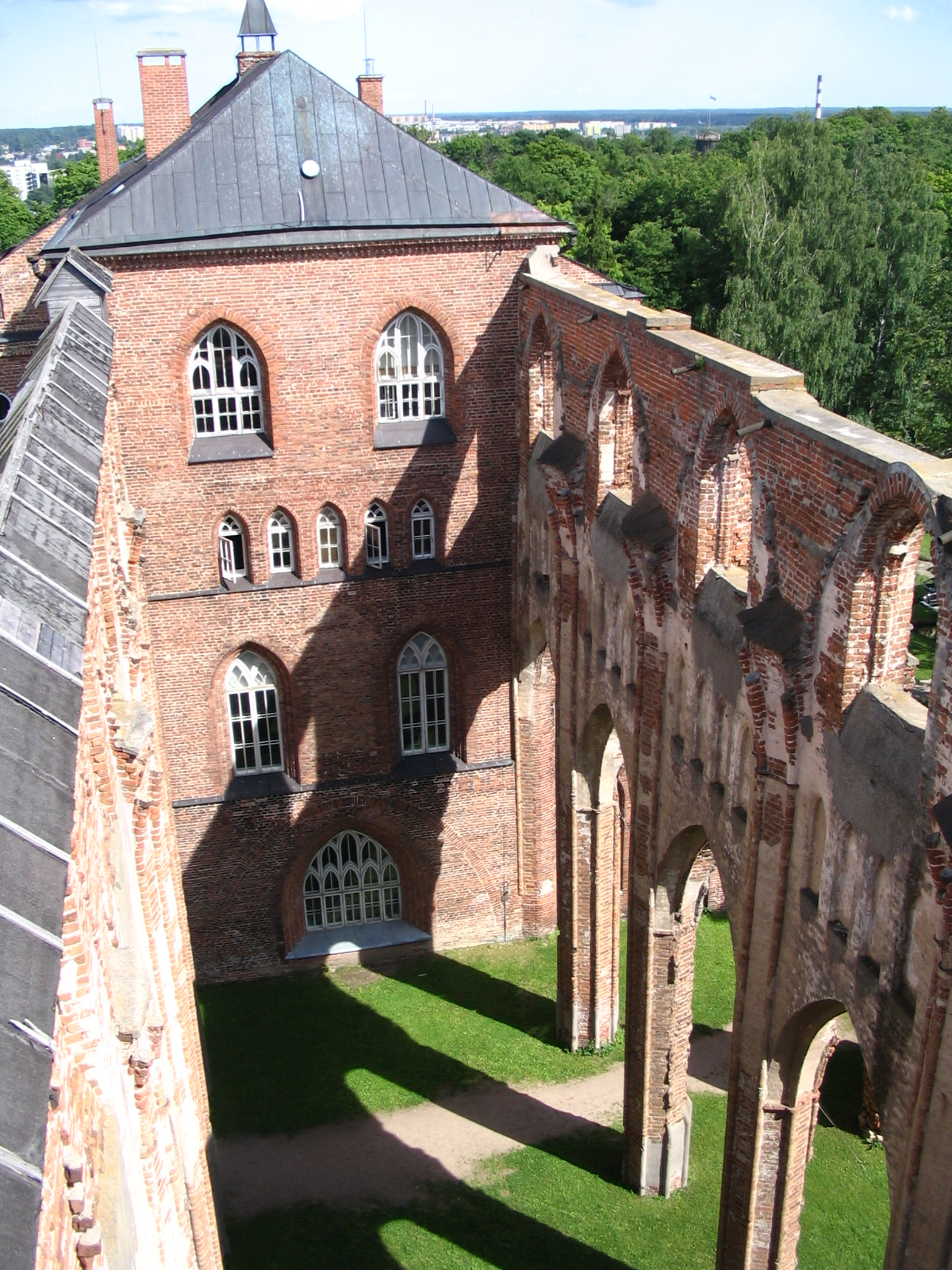
View from the tower over the ruins

Tartu Cathedral (Estonian: Tartu toomkirik), earlier also known as Dorpat Cathedral (German: Dorpater Domkirche), is a former Catholic church in Tartu (Dorpat), Estonia. The building is now an imposing ruin overlooking the lower town. About a third of the cathedral has been renovated. The renovated part houses the museum of the University of Tartu, the premises of which the university also uses for major receptions.

Aerial view of Toomemägi, Tartu cathedral and Tartu downtown july 2021

== History ==
The hill on which the cathedral later stood (Toomemägi or "cathedral hill"), on the Emajõgi River, was one of the largest strongholds of the pagan Estonians, and the strategic nature of the site makes it likely that it had been since the earliest times. It was destroyed in 1224 by the Christian invaders of Livonia. Immediately after the conquest, the Christians began construction of a bishop's fortress, the Castrum Tarbatae, on this strategic spot. (Parts of the old walls of the previous structures have since been revealed by archaeological excavations).

The construction of the Gothic cathedral on the north side of the cathedral hill was probably begun in the second half of the 13th century. It was surrounded by a graveyard and houses for the members of the cathedral chapter. The cathedral was dedicated to Saints Peter and Paul, who were also the patron saints of the city. It was the seat of the Bishopric of Dorpat, and one of the largest religious buildings of Eastern Europe.

The church was originally planned as a basilica, but the later addition of the three-aisled quire gave it the character of a hall church. The quire (in an early form) and nave were already in use by 1299. About 1470 the high quire with its pillars and arches was completed in Brick Gothic style. The cathedral was completed at the end of the 15th century with the building of the two massive fortress-like towers on either side of the west front. The height of the stone parts of the towers without spires was 66 meters. The exact height of the towers with spires is unknown, the French traveler and writer Aubry de La Mottraye, who visited Tartu in 1726, mentioned that "the towers were at least as high as the towers of Notre-Dame de Paris". A wall separated the cathedral grounds and the bishop's fortified residence from the lower town.

== Decline of the cathedral ==
In the mid-1520s the Reformation reached Tartu. On 10 January 1525 the cathedral was badly damaged by Protestant iconoclasts, after which it fell increasingly into decay. After the deportation to Russia of the last Roman Catholic Bishop of Dorpat, Hermann Wesel (bishop from 1554 to 1558; died 1563), the cathedral church was abandoned. During the Livonian War (1558–1583) Russian troops devastated the city.

When in 1582 the city fell to the Poles, the new Roman Catholic rulers planned to rebuild the cathedral, but the plans were abandoned because of the ensuing Polish-Swedish War (1600–1611). A fire in 1624 compounded the damage.

In 1629 Tartu became Swedish, and the new rulers showed little interest in the derelict building, which during their time fell further into ruin and neglect, except that the burials of the townspeople continued in the graveyard well into the 18th century, while the main body of the church served as a barn. In the 1760s the two towers were reduced from 66 meters to 22 meters, the level of the nave roof, and made into a platform for a cannon. The main portal was walled up at this time.

== University ==
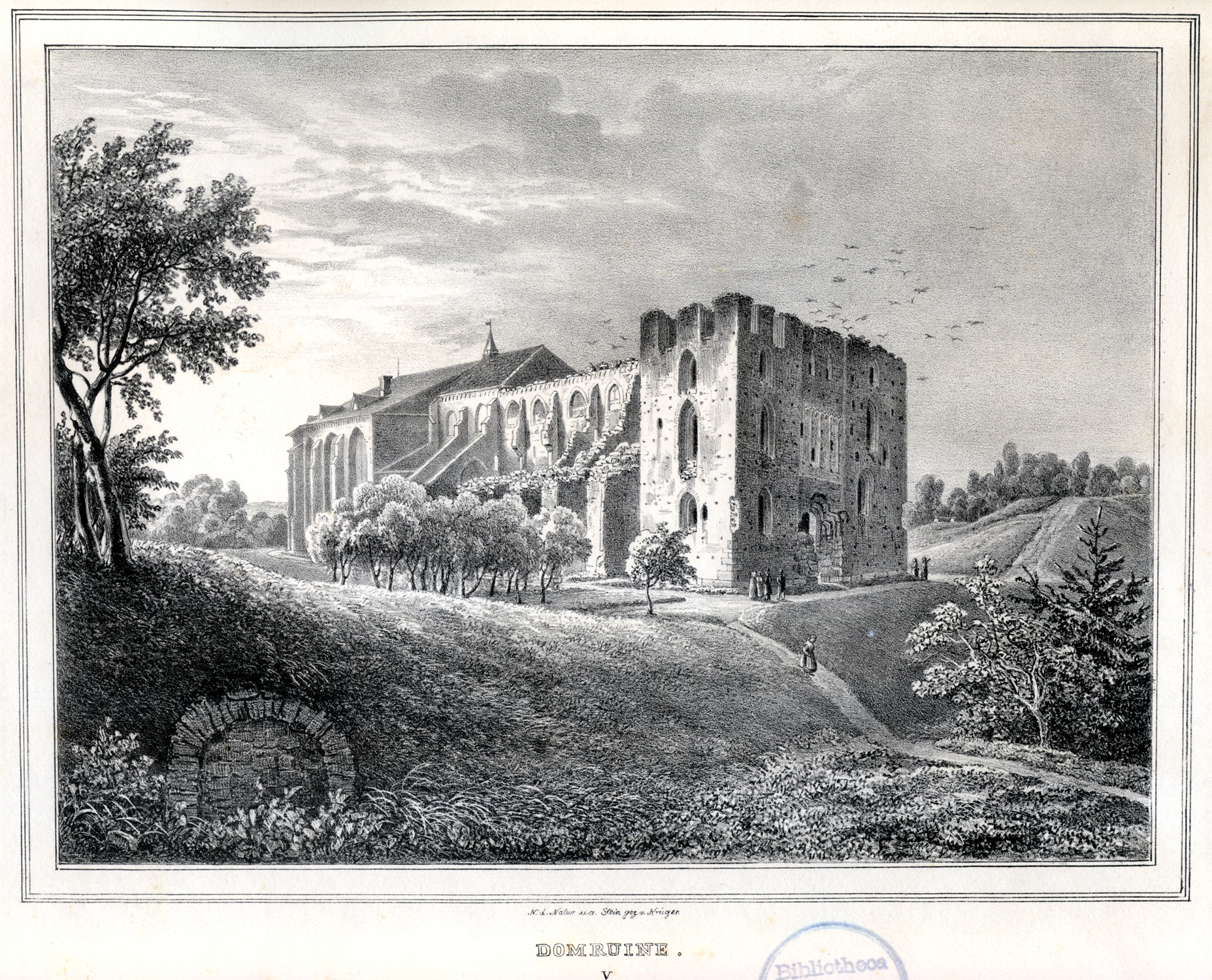
A depiction of the ruins of the cathedral in 1837.

With the founding of the German-speaking Imperial University of Dorpat (German: Kaiserliche Universität Dorpat; now the University of Tartu) by Tsar Alexander I of Russia in 1802, the Baltic German architect Johann Wilhelm Krause was commissioned to build among the cathedral ruins the university library, a three-storey building erected between 1804 and 1807. Krause also planned an observatory in one of the old towers, but this never happened, and the observatory was built new. At the end of the 19th century, the northern tower was converted for use as a water tower.

In the 1960s the library building was extended and fitted with central heating. When it was replaced in 1981 by a new university library building, the old library became the home of the historical museum of the University of Tartu (Estonian: Tartu Ülikooli ajaloomuuseum). A thorough building conversion took place in 1985 when the 19th-century interior was largely restored. Today the museum contains displays of important artifacts of the university's history, scientific instruments and rare books. The rest of the cathedral ruins and the external walls of the quire have been structurally secured and consolidated.

Until the end of the 1990s, in addition to the university museum, the renovated part housed the offices of the History Department of the University, and the premises were also used by the Tartu University congregation of the Estonian Evangelical Lutheran Church for worship services. In the 1990s, the art department of the university was also located in the building.

== Toomemägi ==
The area surrounding the cathedral – the cathedral hill or Toomemägi – was landscaped as a park in the 19th century. Besides a cafe, the park now contains numerous monuments to people connected to the scientific and literary traditions of Tartu. These include among others: Karl Ernst von Baer (1792–1876), Tartu's greatest natural scientist; Kristjan Jaak Peterson (1801–1822), the first Estonian poet; Nikolay Pirogov (1810–1881), a famous Russian doctor; and Friedrich Robert Faehlmann (1798–1850), the initiator of the Estonian national epic, the Kalevipoeg.

The path to the lower town is spanned by the Inglisild or Angel Bridge, a name which is very likely however to represent a corruption of an original "Englische Brücke" or "English bridge", built between 1814 and 1816. A portrait relief in the middle commemorates the first rector of the re-founded university in 1802, Georg Friedrich Parrot (1767–1852), and bears the inscription Otium reficit vires ("Leisure Renews the Powers"). Also on the Toomemägi are the seat of the Estonian Supreme Court, Dorpat Observatory (tähetorn), built in 1811, university classrooms, and the university's old anatomy theatre.

== See also ==
- List of cathedrals in Estonia
