= Philipp Schall von Bell =

Philipp Schall von Bell (died 1560) was the commander-in-chief (Landmarschall) of the Livonian Confederation forces during the first two years of the Livonian War (1558–1583). Von Bell was taken prisoner after the disastrous Battle of Ergeme and executed by tsar Ivan IV of Russia.

Philipp Schall von Bell joined the Livonian Order around the year 1540. From 1545 he held the post of vice commander (Hauskomtur) in Riga and in 1551 he became commander (Komtur) of Marienburg (Alūksne). After the Livonian War began in 1558, he became the last Land Marshal or commander-in-chief of the Livonian Order.

On 2 August 1560, upon hearing the news of Muscovites leaving Dorpat (Tartu) for a siege of Fellin (Viljandi), von Bell set up an ambush near the village Ermes (Ergeme, Latvia). Von Bell miscalculated the strength of the enemy; he expected to attack and destroy a small detachment but instead ran into the main Muscovite army. His small force of a few hundred members of the Order and 500 auxiliaries succeeded in smashing through the Muscovite front, however, the Russian flank successfully maneuvered through the woods surrounding woodland, enveloped the Livonian forces and forced them to flee in disarray. This was the last field battle of the Livonian Order; after that, the Order only managed to offer resistance from castles, for example in Weissenstein (Paide, Estonia).

Philipp Schall von Bell was taken prisoner by Aleksey Adashev's men; in total, the Russians captured eleven senior officers and 120 German nobles. Initially, the Muscovite commanders treated the prisoners with respect, hoping that this would help in securing the loyalty of conquered Livonia. Schall von Bell and senior Livonian officers were sent to the court of tsar Ivan IV of Russia. When they finally met, Ivan was enraged by von Bell's hostile and unforgiving answers, and ordered the immediate execution of the prisoners. Philipp and his brother, Werner Schall von Bell (Komtur of Goldingen), as well as three other nobles were beheaded, their bodies thrown to the dogs. According to another version of the story, the prisoners were doomed by Adashev's patronage; Ivan had been displeased with Adashev earlier and had demoted him from court service to the combat troops. Aleksey Adashev died of fever in Dorpat in the same year; his brother Daniil was executed by Ivan in 1563.

The sole survivor among the high-ranking prisoners of the war, the Bishop of Dorpat Hermann II Wesel, who had been captured in 1558, retained Ivan's favor and was allowed to bury the dead outside of town in accordance with the manner of the Catholic faith. Centuries later, the tombstones of an abandoned cemetery were reused for the pavement of Moscow streets. In 1823, the tomb of Werner Schall von Bell was discovered in the mud of Yakimanka District, and since then has been preserved, first in the Rumyantsev Museum and now in the Moscow Kremlin.

== See also ==
- Johann Adam Schall von Bell
