= Velga Krile =

Latvian poet and playwright

- Born: September 27, 1945 Valka Parish, Latvian SSR
- Died: August 31, 1991 (age 45) Valka Parish, Latvia
- Writing career
- Genres: Poem, play wright

Velga Krile (1945–1991) was a Latvian poet and playwright. She has been cited as one of Latvia's most talented poets on the scene in the late 1970s, along with Uldis Bērziņš, Leons Briedis, Māra Misiņa, Māra Zālīte and Klāvs Elsbergs. She was a member of the Writer's Union of Latvia. She committed suicide in 1991.

== Works ==
=== Poems ===
- „Dzeltenās palodzes” (1966),
- „Bērzi” (1976),
- „Gaismēna” (1979),
- „Es diennaktī esmu” (1982),
- „Nepiekrāp mani” (1985),
- „Uz zāles fona” (1989),
- „Uz tā tālā ceļa” (1991).

=== Plays ===
- "Orfejs un Eiridike”(1968),
- „Dimanta dziesma” (1969.),
- „Stepans Razins” (1969./70.),
- „Vanems Imanta” (1972.),
- „Ivans Bargais” (1973.),
- „Vietlavs un Veseta” (1976.),
- „Asaras”(farss)(1976.),
- ”Katastrofa” (1979.),
- „Vai jūs baiļojaties, jūs, mazticīgie!” (1980.),
- „N-tā pilsēta” (1983.),
- „Nebukadnecars” (1983./84.),
- „Kains” (1984.),
- „Leģenda” (1984./85.),
- „Tronis un mīlestība” (1985.),
- „Svētlaimīgo sala” (1987.),
- „Manā zemē ir tādi vārdi…” (1990.)
