= Hermann II =

Hermann II may refer to:

- Hermann II, Duke of Swabia (died in 1003)
- Herman II (Archbishop of Cologne) (995–1056)
- Hermann II, Count Palatine of Lotharingia (1049–1085)
- Herman II, Margrave of Baden (died in 1130)
- Herman II, Count of Winzenburg (died 1152)
- Hermann II, Lord of Lippe (1196–1229)
- Hermann II, Landgrave of Thuringia (1222–1241)
- Hermann II von Buxhoeveden (1163–1248)
- Hermann II, Landgrave of Hesse (1341–1413)
- Hermann II, Count of Celje (ca. 1365–1435)
- Hermann II of Dorpat (died in 1563)
