= Augusta Deglava bridge =

Traffic overpass in Riga, Latvia

Coordinates: 56.9525°N 24.1606°E

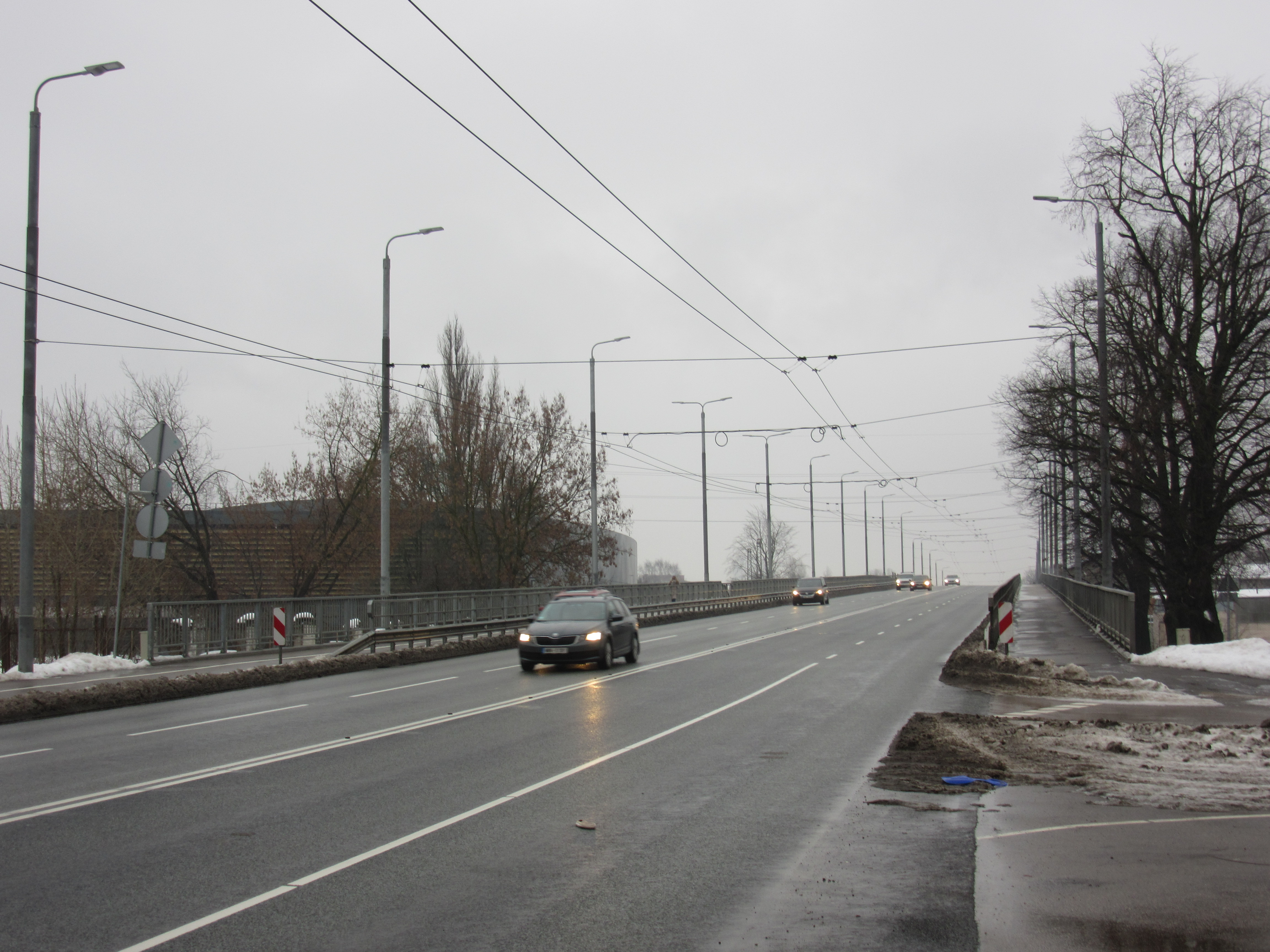
Deglava bridge in 2021 (after reconstruction)

The Augusta Deglava bridge or the Deglava bridge is a traffic overpass in Riga over the railway lines Zemitani—Šķirotava and Rīga—Lugaži connecting Riga with Purvciem. The bridge is part of Augusta Deglava Street.

== History ==
The bridge was built using the precast concrete bridge method with only the posts having been made on site. The project was developed by Lengiprotrans company based in Leningrad by L. Isarov and A. Lavrentiev. Some 264 blocks 12–33 meters long each were made in Russian reinforced concrete construction factories. The construction works were carried out by the mobile construction unit Mostopoyezd No. 410 (Мостопоезд № 410) under the leadership of the chief engineer A. Rendelis, which had already built several bridges in Latvia before that, including the 13th January street bridge over the city canal in 1961 and the bridge over Lielupi in Jurmala. During the construction of the bridge, 498 6-10 meter long piles were driven and 9,000 m^{3} of reinforced concrete were used. Before the opening, the load-bearing capacity of the bridge was tested in the usual way at the time, by loading it with trucks whose cargo boxes were filled with sand and gravel.

The bridge was opened in 1966 and named after the Augusta Deglava street leading through it, which is named after the writer Augusts Deglavs. The name was officially given in 2014.

In 2018, after the inspections, the reconstruction began. The estimated price of the reconstruction was 4.27 million euros to rebuild the lighting, renovate the road surface and build new sidewalks, including a bicycle path, railings and safety barriers, as well as build an underpass. The construction works are taking place as part of the EU fund project.
