= Lugaži =

Village in Latvia

Lugaži Lugažu Muiža
- Village
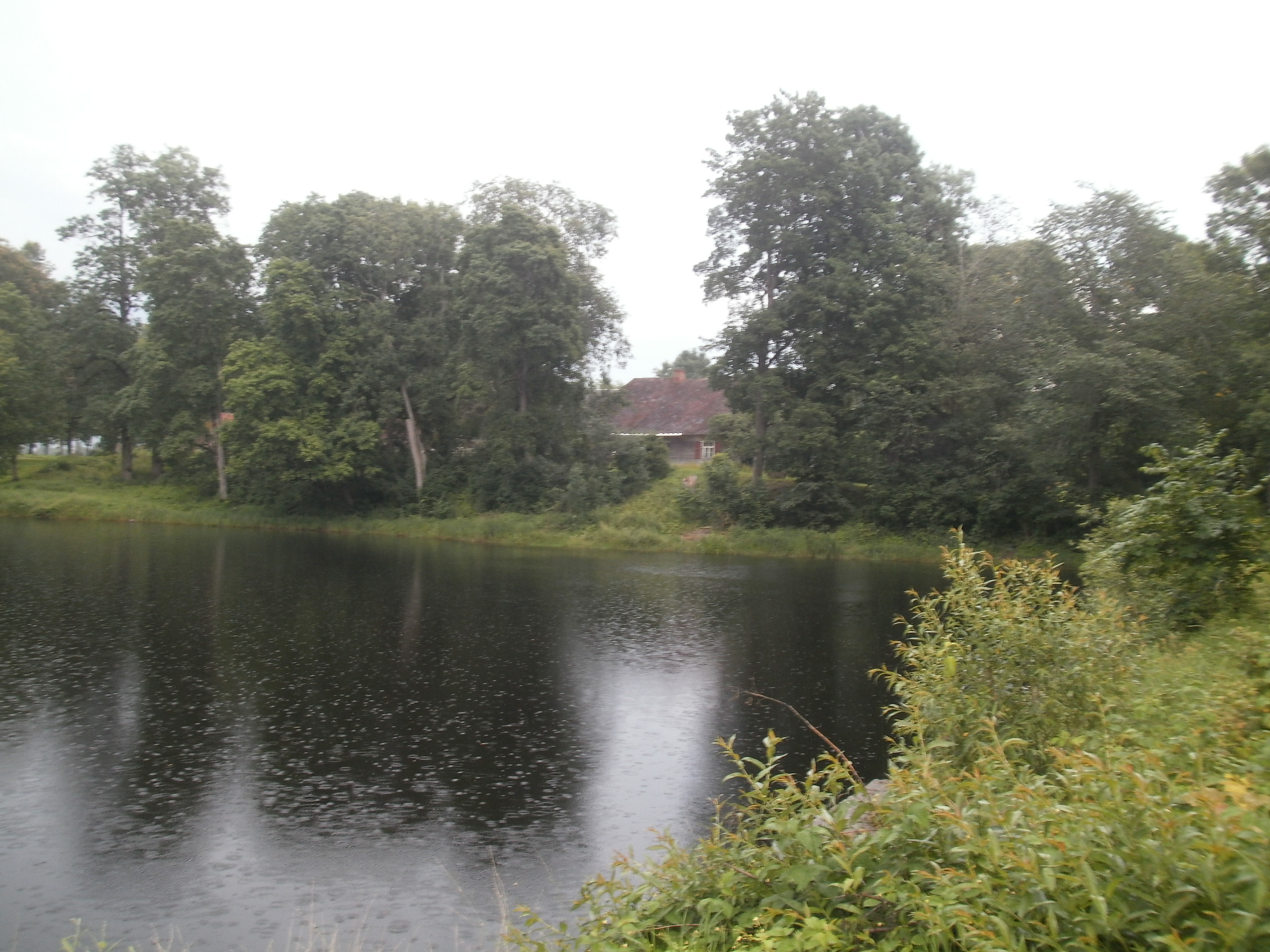
- Lugaži

- Location in Latvia
- Coordinates: 57°46′N 25°57′E
- Country: Latvia
- Municipality: Valka Municipality
- Established: 1344
- Elevation: 76 m (249 ft)

Population
  - Total: 239 (29 January 2,021)
- Time zone: UTC+2 (EET)
  - Summer (DST): UTC+3 (EEST)
- Postal code: LV-4701 Valka-1
- Calling code: +371 647

Lugaži (Estonian: Luke, German: Luhde) is a village in the Valka Parish of Valka municipality in the Vidzeme region of Latvia.

== History ==
The small community is largely a satellite town of Valka. It has a railway station, and until international services were resumed in 2008, it was the terminus of trains running on the Riga–Lugaži Railway. Since 2008, however, all trains travel on from Lugaži and cross the international border into Estonia, terminating at Valga. From Valga a connecting train service is available through Estonia, to Tallinn, providing a direct rail link between the two capital cities of Riga and Tallinn.

Lugaži was first mentioned in the year 1344 when Luke Castle was built.
