= Kesklinn =

"Kesklinn" is the Estonian word for the centre of a city or town. It may refer to the following places:

- Kesklinn, Tallinn
- Kesklinn, Tartu
