= Ērģeme =

Village in Latvia

- Village
- Lejasciems's location in Latvia
- Coordinates: 57°48′19.82″N 25°48′56.98″E
- Country: Latvia
- Municipality: Valka
- Parish: Ērģeme

Population (2007)
  - Total: 321
- Website: ergeme.lv

Ērģeme (Estonian: Härgmäe) is a village in Valka municipality, in the Vidzeme region of Latvia. It is the centre of Ērģeme parish. It is the location of the ruins of Ērģeme Castle, an Ordensburg which was built in the 14th century in place of an ancient Estonian hillfort, then part of Sakala county.

== Ērģeme Castle ==
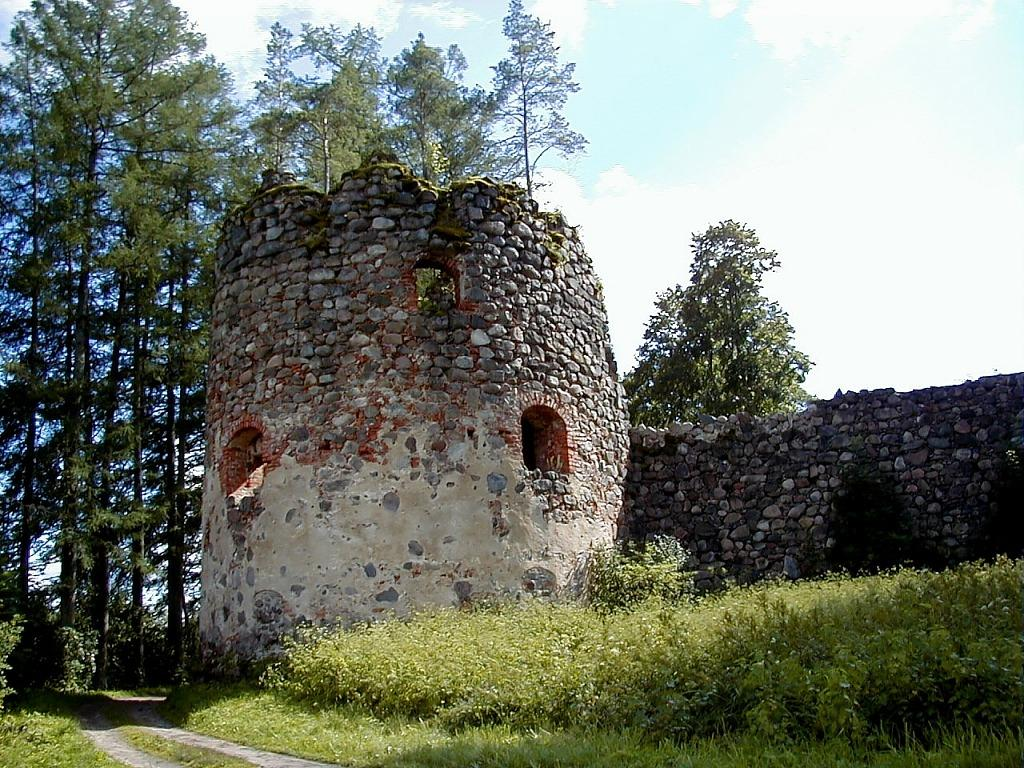

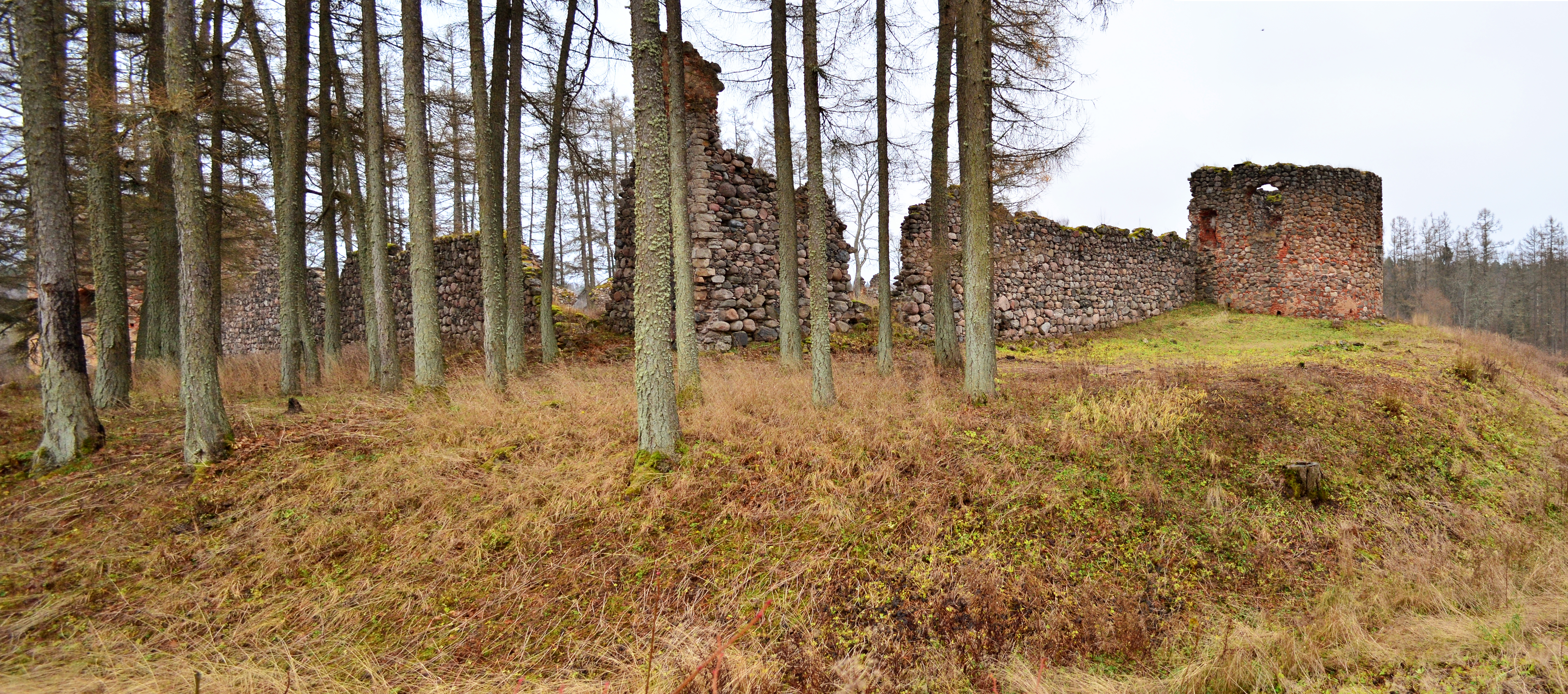

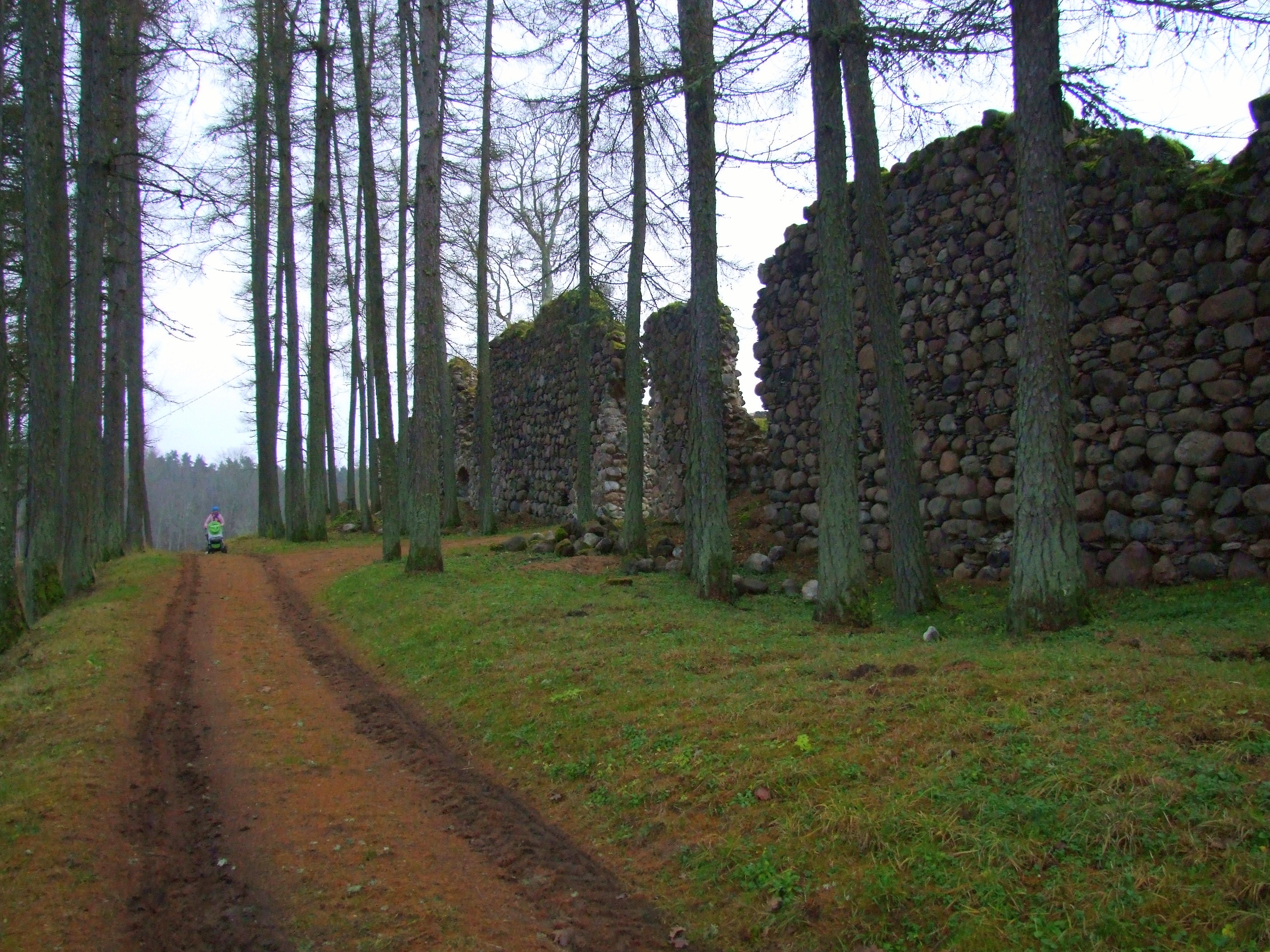

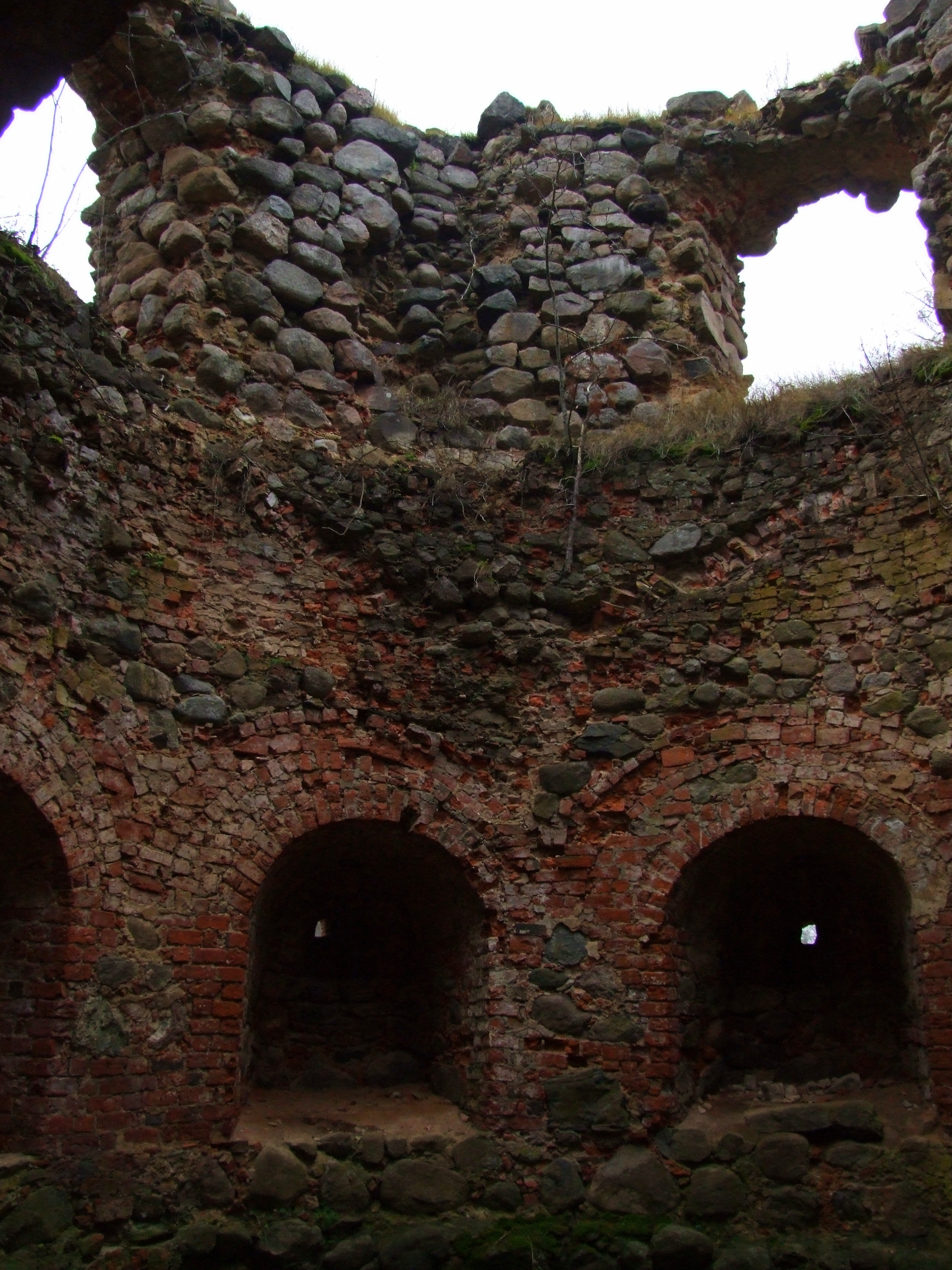

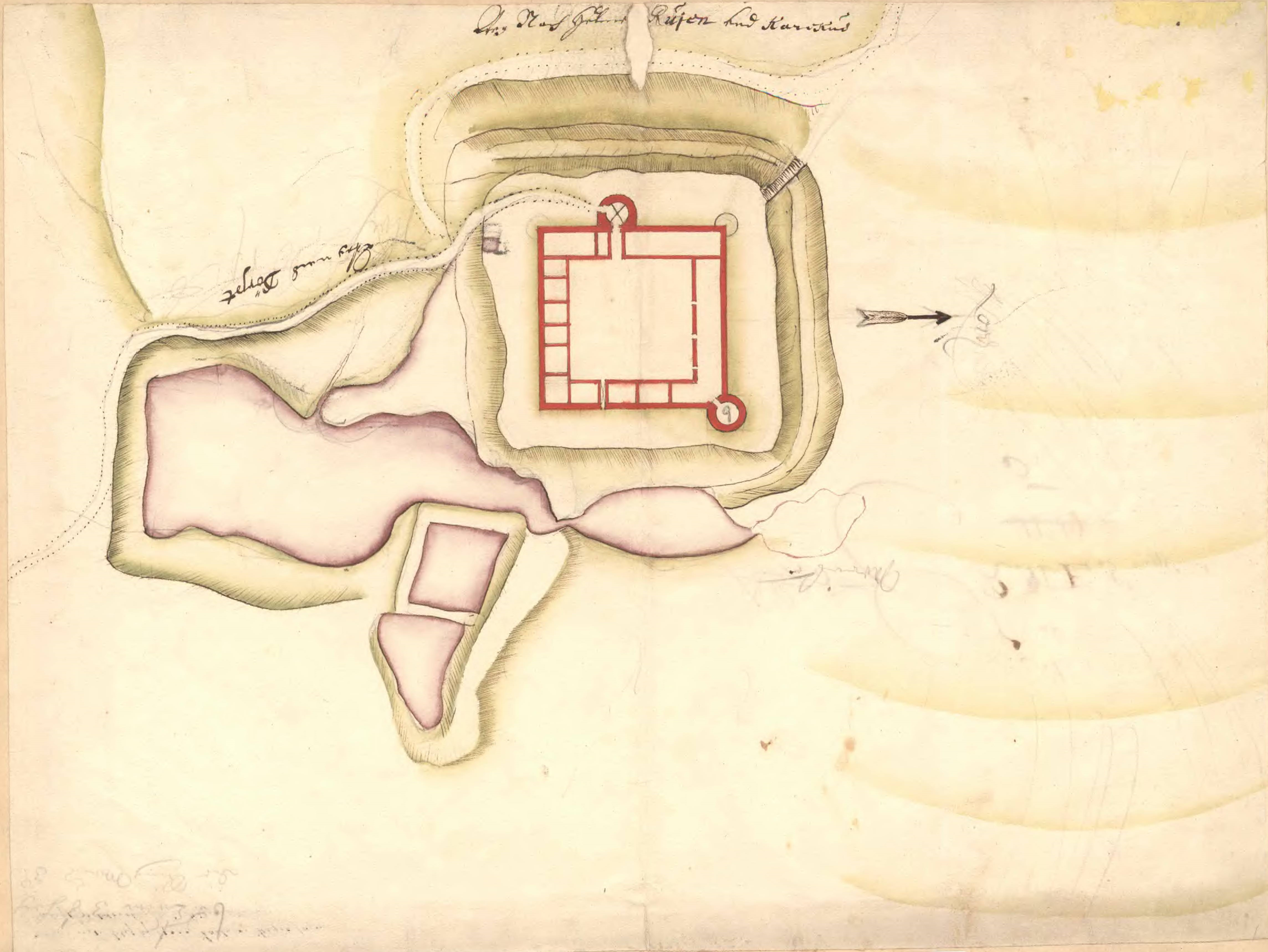

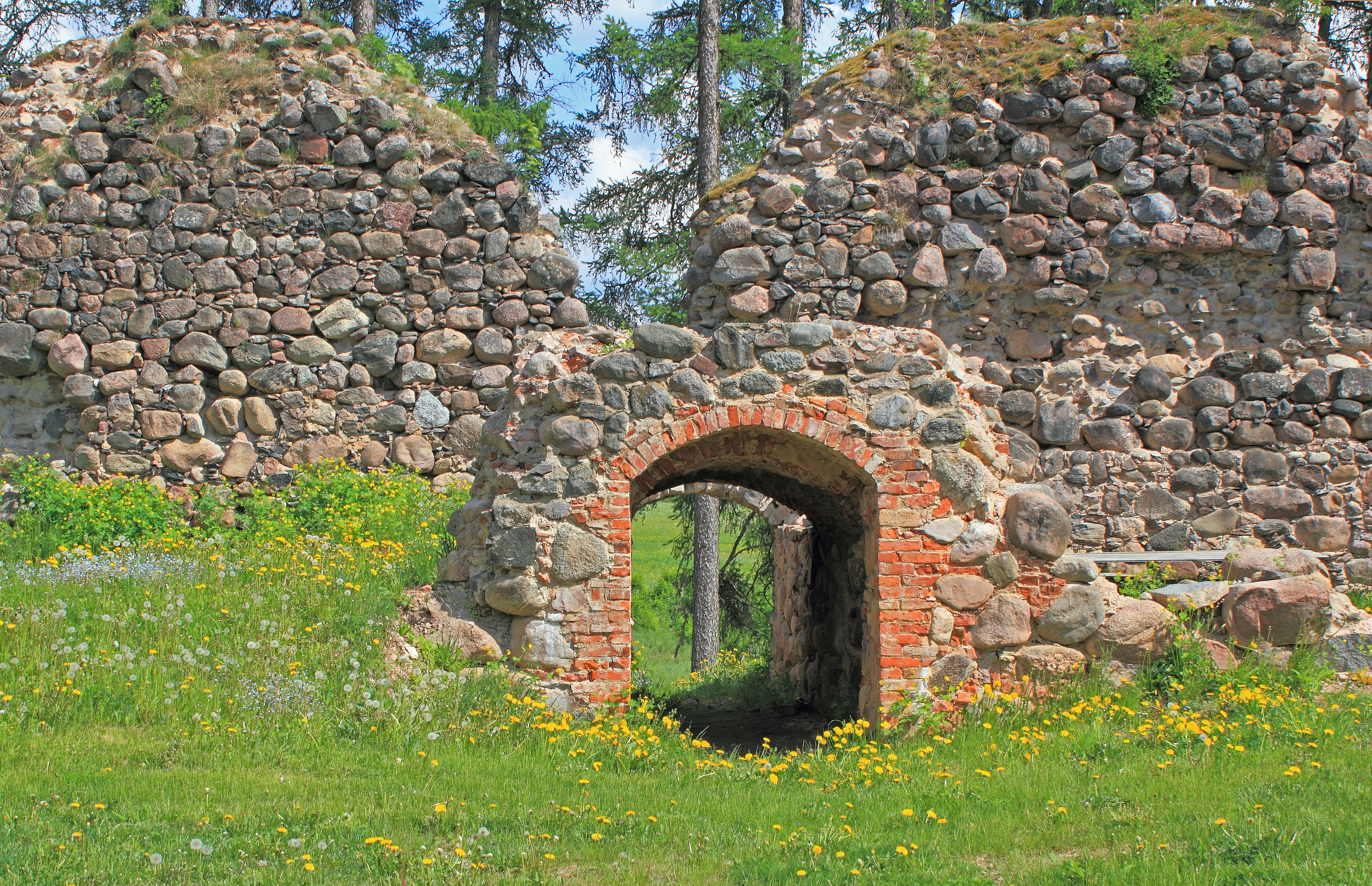

== See also ==
- Battle of Ergeme
