= Pedeli =

River in Estonia

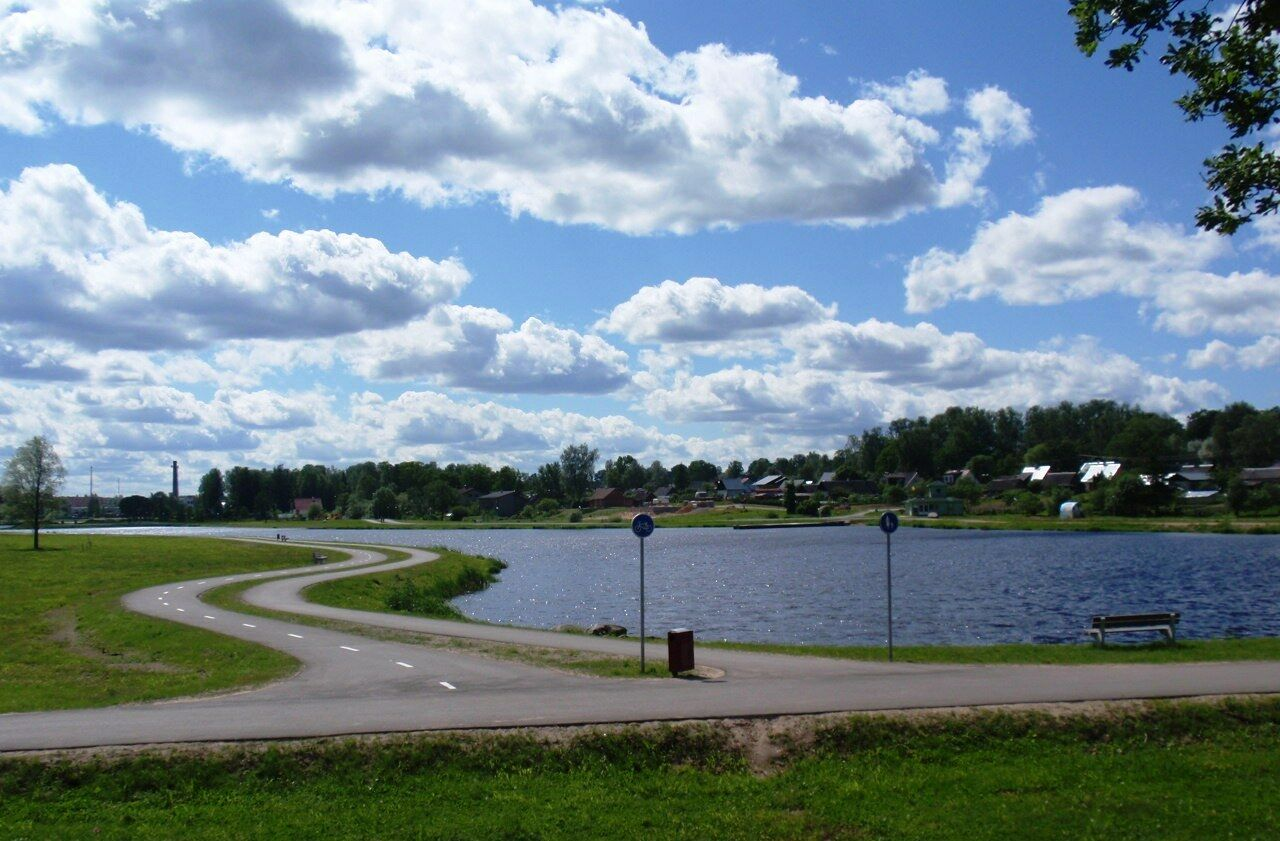
- Pedeli River in Valga, Estonia

Location
- Countries: Estonia; Latvia

Physical characteristics
- Source
  - location: Kadastiku Lake
- Mouth
  - location: Väike Emajõgi
  - coordinates: 57°51′00″N 26°08′10″E
- Length: 31 km (19 mi)
- Basin size: 229 km^{2} (88 sq mi)

Basin features
- Progression: Väike Emajõgi→ Lake Võrtsjärv→ Emajõgi→ Lake Peipus→ Narva→ Gulf of Finland

The Pedeli (Estonian: Pedeli jõgi, Latvian: Pedele) is a 31 km long river in Estonia and Latvia. The river runs through the Estonian city of Valga and the Latvian city of Valka.
