= Valka Town Theatre =

Theatre in Valka, Latvia

- Valkas pilsētas teātris
- Interactive map of Valka Town Theatre
- Address: 8, Emīla Dārziņa iela, Valka, Valkas novads, Vidzeme, LV-4701, Latvia; Valka; Latvia
- Coordinates: 57°46′26″N 26°01′05″E
- Current use: State repertory theater

Construction
- Opened: 10 May 1871

Website
- www.valkasteatris.lv

Valka Town Theatre (Latvian: Valkas pilsētas teātris) is one of the oldest theatres in Latvia, in the town of Valka, North Vidzeme. Its activity started on 10 May 1871, with the production of Hesse Vahgesa's play "Kleine Lisa".

== History ==
A fact mentioned in the history of the Latvian theatre that as early as 1870 a play was performed in Latvian to a closed audience in the Jānis Cimze Vidzeme Parish Teachers' Seminary. Unfortunately, no supporting documentation of this mentioned fact has been preserved. In spite of historic events, the theatre has existed from Valka's founding days. Even during World War I, the Temporary National Theatre and Temporary National Opera started their activities in the Valka Town Theatre. Today both operate in Riga as The Latvian National Theatre and The Latvian National Opera and Ballet Theatre. Upon graduation from the Jāzeps Vītols Music Academy in 1982, Dr. Aivars Ikselis became the director of the Valka Town Theatre. Today the theatre’s repertoire consists of the world’s drama classics including Anton Chekhov, Nikolai Gogol, Jean Cocteau, Latvian plays by dramatists Rūdolfs Blaumanis, Jānis Rainis, and Agita Dragūna.

== Theatre festivals ==
Included, as part of the activity of the Valka Town Theatre has been the organization of the international independent, semiprofessional, and professional theatre festival “Tālvils.” The first international theatre festival “Tālvils” took place in Valka in 1996, followed by festivals in 1998, 2001, 2003, 2005, 2006, 2007, 2009. Participants included theatre troupes from Latvia, Estonia, Lithuania, Russia, Germany, Belgium, The Netherlands, Poland, Finland, Denmark, Austria, Turkey, Georgia, Croatia, Hungary, Romania, Ukraine, and Belarus.

== Theatre awards ==
- Laughter, Tears, And Love Awards (Ekaterinburg, Russia)
- Travnhevij Awards (Kiev, Ukraine)
- Fiesta Awards (Caracas, Venezuela)
- Provincial Theatre Awards (Lipetsk, Russia)
- FOCUS Awards (Salzburg, Austria)
- Forum Awards (Vilnius, Lithuania)
- Siberian Ramp Awards (Irkutsk, Russia)
- GIFT Awards (Tbilisi, Georgia)
- Sea and Youth Awards (Burgosa, Bulgaria)
