= Engelbert von Dolen =

Engelbert von Dolen (died 1347) was a 14th-century clergyman in medieval Livonia.

He may have studied in Bologna in 1304. He was provost in Tartu (Dorpat) 1323–1341 and Bishop of Dorpat 1341–1347. In July 1336 Engelbert von Dolen participated in the coronation of Swedish King Magnus IV and Blanche of Namur in Storkyrkan in Stockholm. He was named Archbishop of Riga in 1341 and formally occupied the bishop's chair until his death in 1347. However, due to conflicts with the Teutonic Order, he was never able to go to Riga. He died in exile at the Papal Court in Avignon.
