= Vents Armands Krauklis =

Deputy of the Saeima (born (1964)

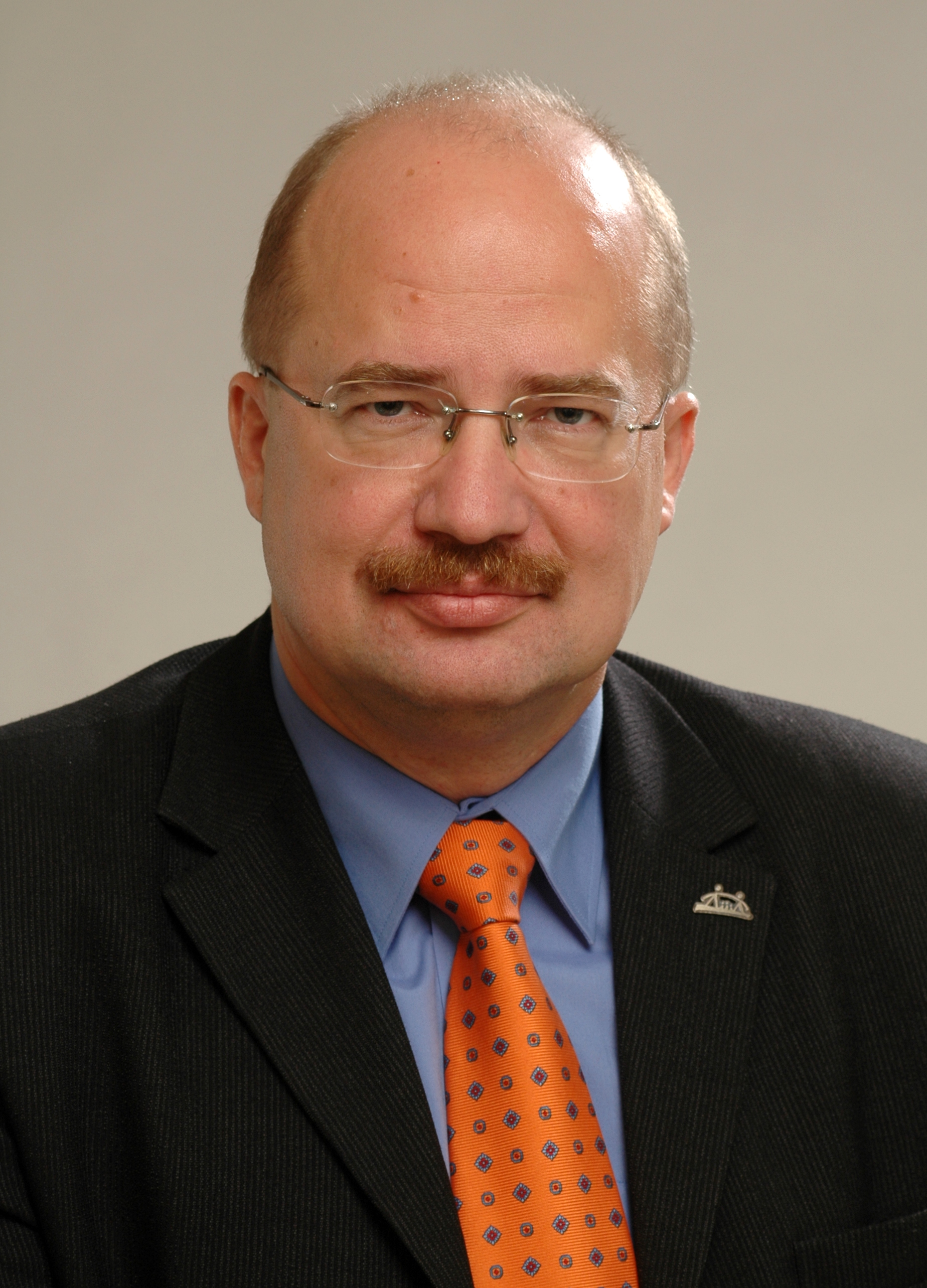
- Vents Armands Krauklis in 2006

Member of the 9th Saeima
- In office November 7, 2006 – November 2, 2010

Mayor of Valka
- In office 2001 – 2006

Personal details
- Born: February 3, 1964 (age 62) Valka, Latvian SSR, Soviet Union
- Party: People's Party
- Other political affiliations: Vidzeme Party

Vents Armands Krauklis (born 3 February 1964 in Valka, Latvian SSR) is a Latvian politician and musician as a member of the famous melodic music band Bumerangs. He was a Deputy of the Saeima and a member of the People's Party. He was the Mayor of Valka Municipality as a member of the regionalist Vidzeme Party, which nationally is allied to the Latvian Association of Regions.
