= Ērģeme Parish =

Parish of Latvia

- Coat of arms

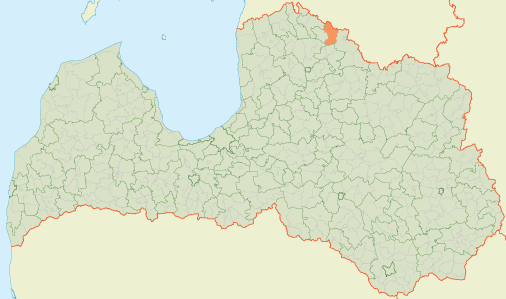
- Interactive map of Ērģeme Parish
- Coordinates: 57°49′09″N 25°46′46″E
- Country: Latvia
- Municipality: Valka

Area
  - Total: 179.2 km^{2} (69.2 sq mi)

Population (1 January 2026)
  - Total: 655
  - Density: 3.66/km^{2} (9.47/sq mi)
- Time zone: Eastern European Time

Ērģeme Parish (Latvian: Ērģemes pagasts) is an administrative unit of Valka Municipality, Latvia.
