= Valka Municipality =

Municipality of Latvia

Coordinates: 57°46′04″N 25°56′49″E

Valka Municipality Valkas novads
- Municipality
- Flag Coat of arms

- Country: Latvia
- Formed: 2009
- Centre: Valka

Government
  - Council Chair: Vents Armands Krauklis (Vidzeme Party)

Area
  - Total: 908.82 km^{2} (350.90 sq mi)
  - Land: 880.52 km^{2} (339.97 sq mi)
  - Water: 28.3 km^{2} (10.9 sq mi)

Population (2026)
  - Total: 7,501
  - Density: 8.519/km^{2} (22.06/sq mi)
- Website: www.valka.lv

Valka Municipality (Latvian: Valkas novads; Estonian: Valka piirkond) is a municipality in Vidzeme, Latvia. The municipality was formed in 2009 by merging Valka town, Ērģeme Parish, Kārķi Parish, Valka Parish, Vijciems Parish and Zvārtava Parish. The administrative centre is Valka.

The population in 2020 was 7,603.

In 2016 it was announced that due to better welfare and higher salaries in neighbouring Estonia, over 10% of municipality's inhabitants have registered themselves as inhabitants of Valga County.

== Twin towns — sister cities ==
Valka is twinned with:

- Braslaw, Belarus
- Çamlıyayla, Turkey
- Durbuy, Belgium
- I'billin, Israel
- Kościelisko, Poland
- Kobylnica, Poland
- (Georgia (country)) Kutaisi, Georgia
- Marijampolė, Lithuania
- Novoye Devyatkino, Russia
- Orimattila, Finland
- Östhammar, Sweden
- Tvrdošín, Slovakia
- Uusikaupunki, Finland
- Valga, Estonia
- Valga, Spain
- Weißenburg-Gunzenhausen, Germany

== Images ==
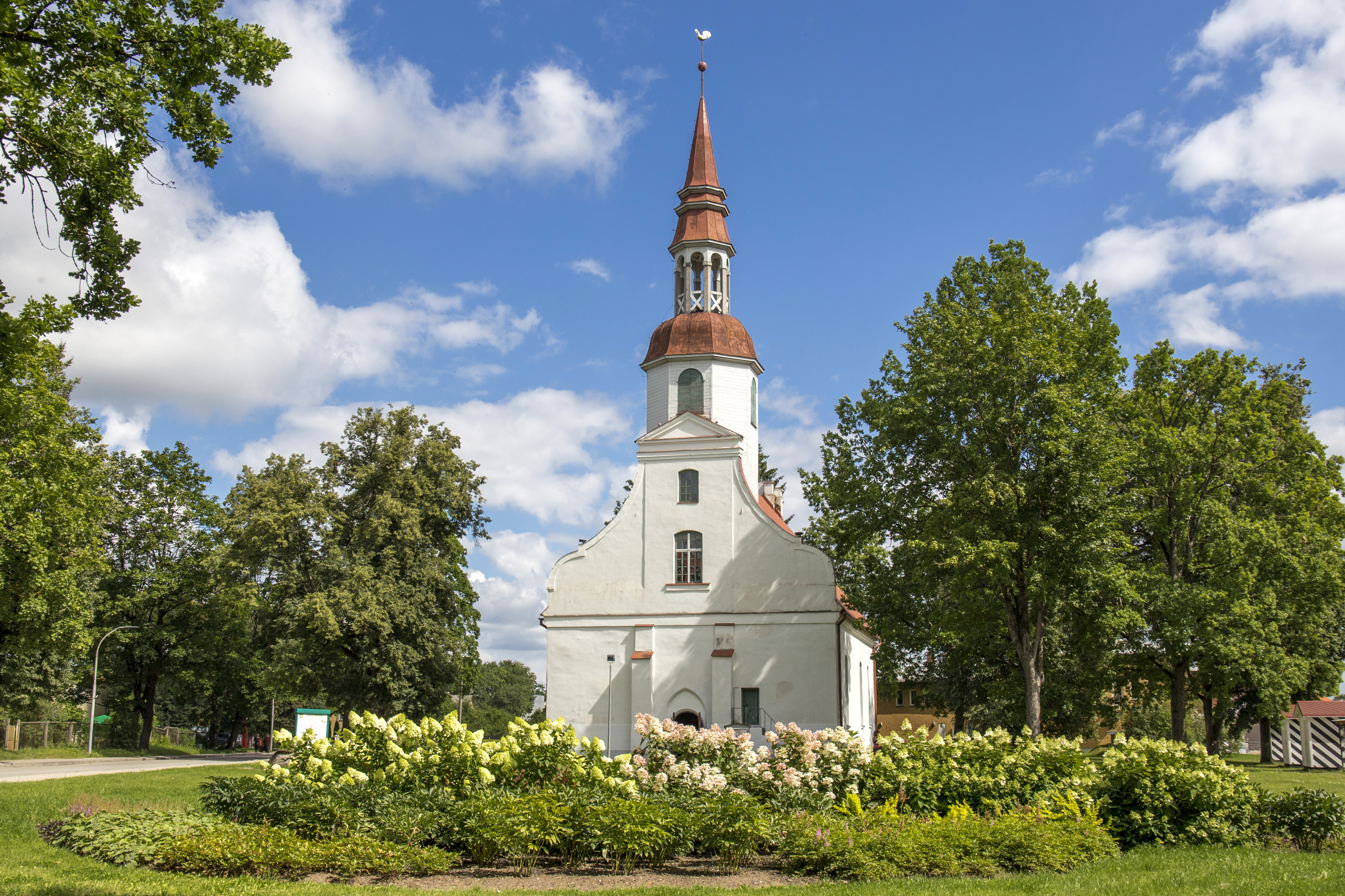
Valka Lutheran Church

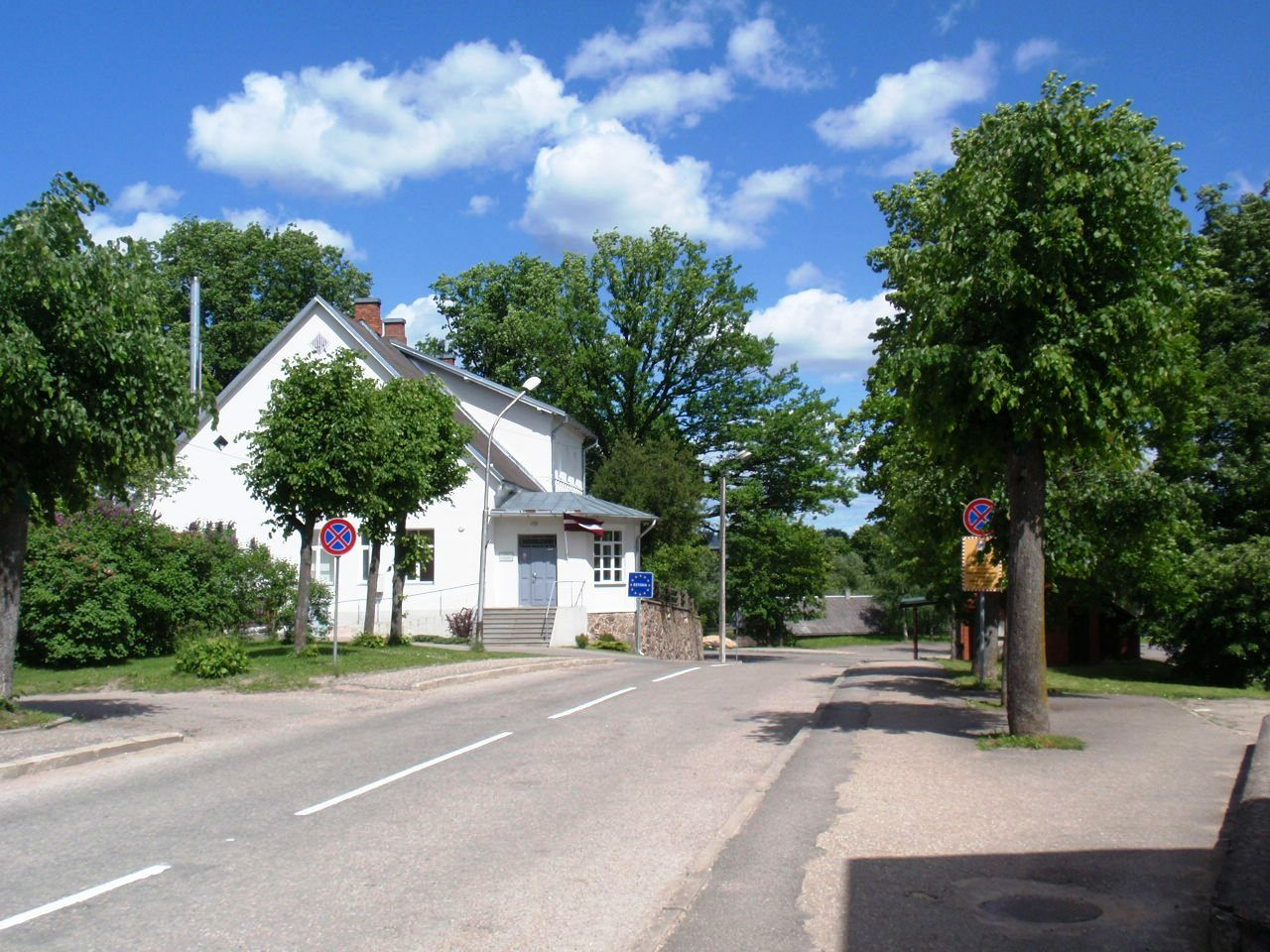
View towards the former border crossing into Estonia

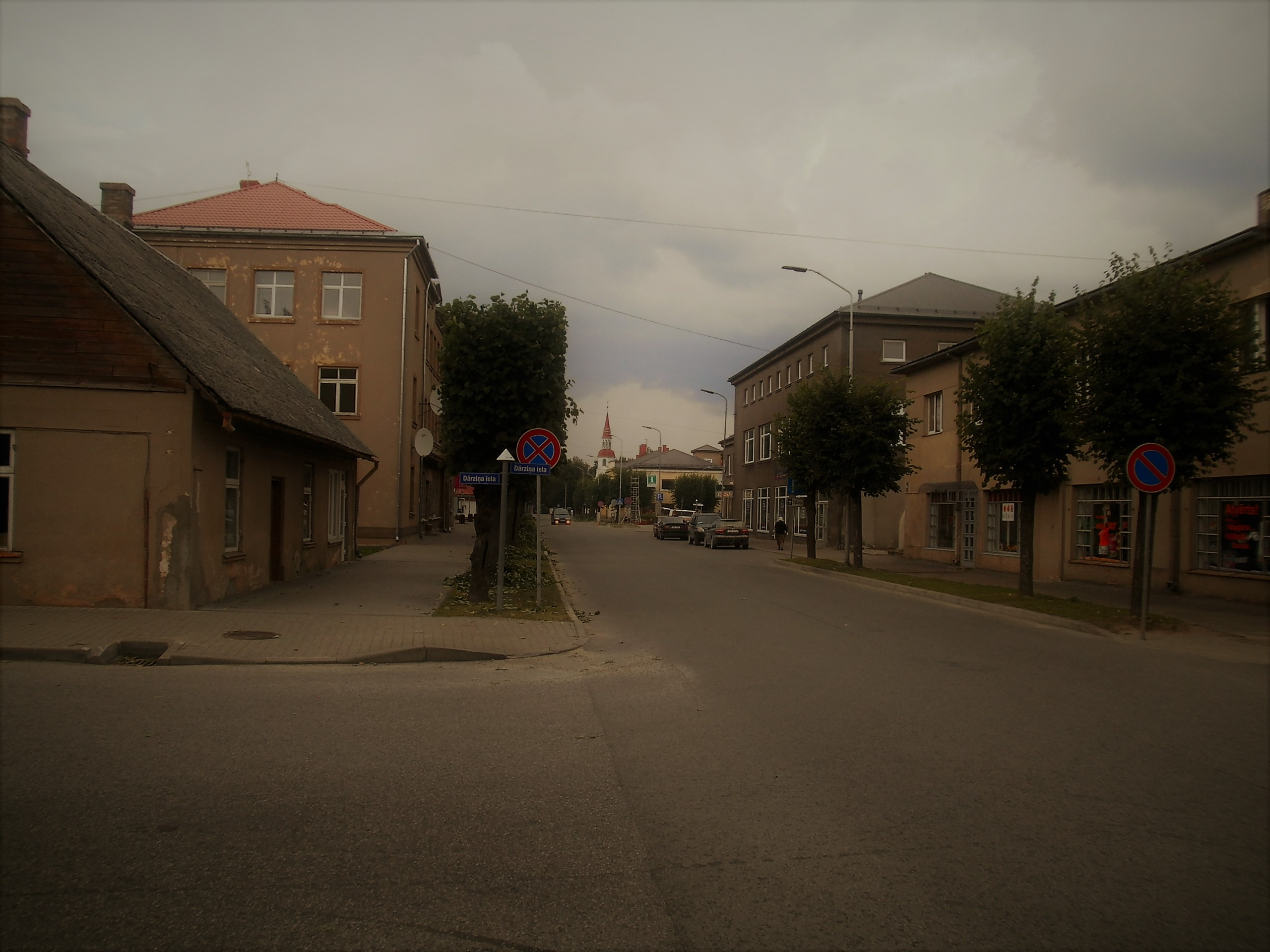
Valka centre

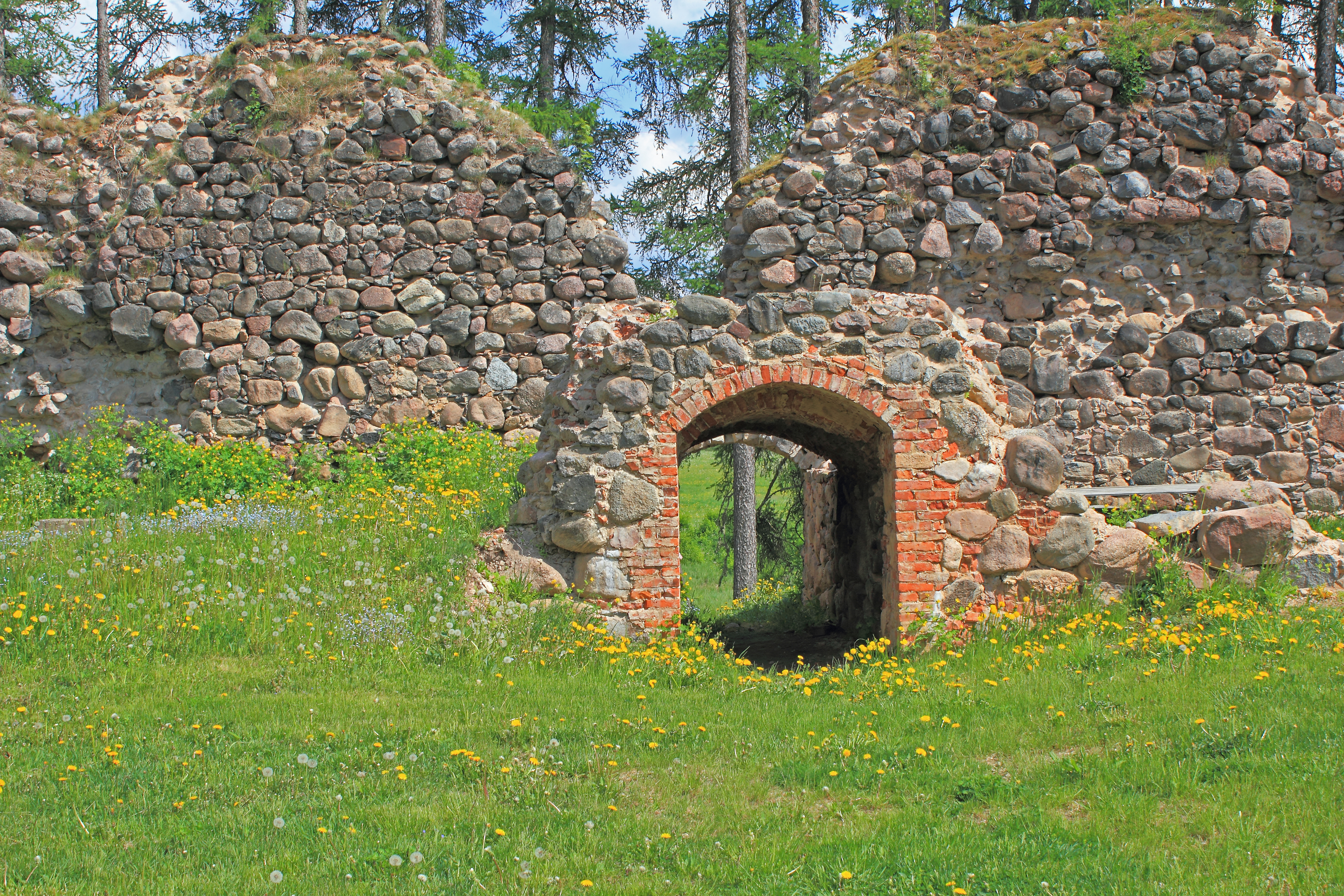
Ērģeme Castle Ruins

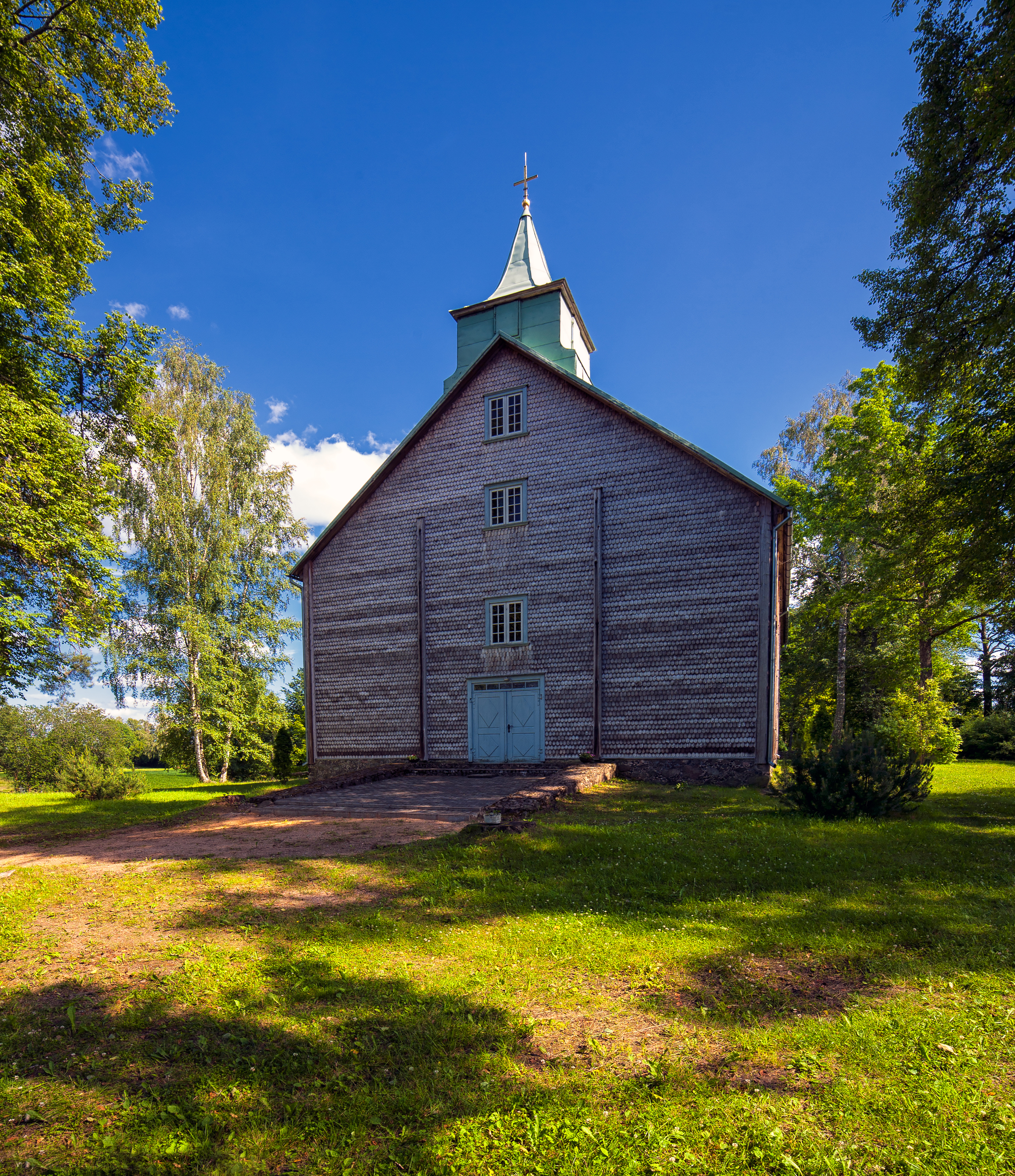
Vijciems Lutheran Church

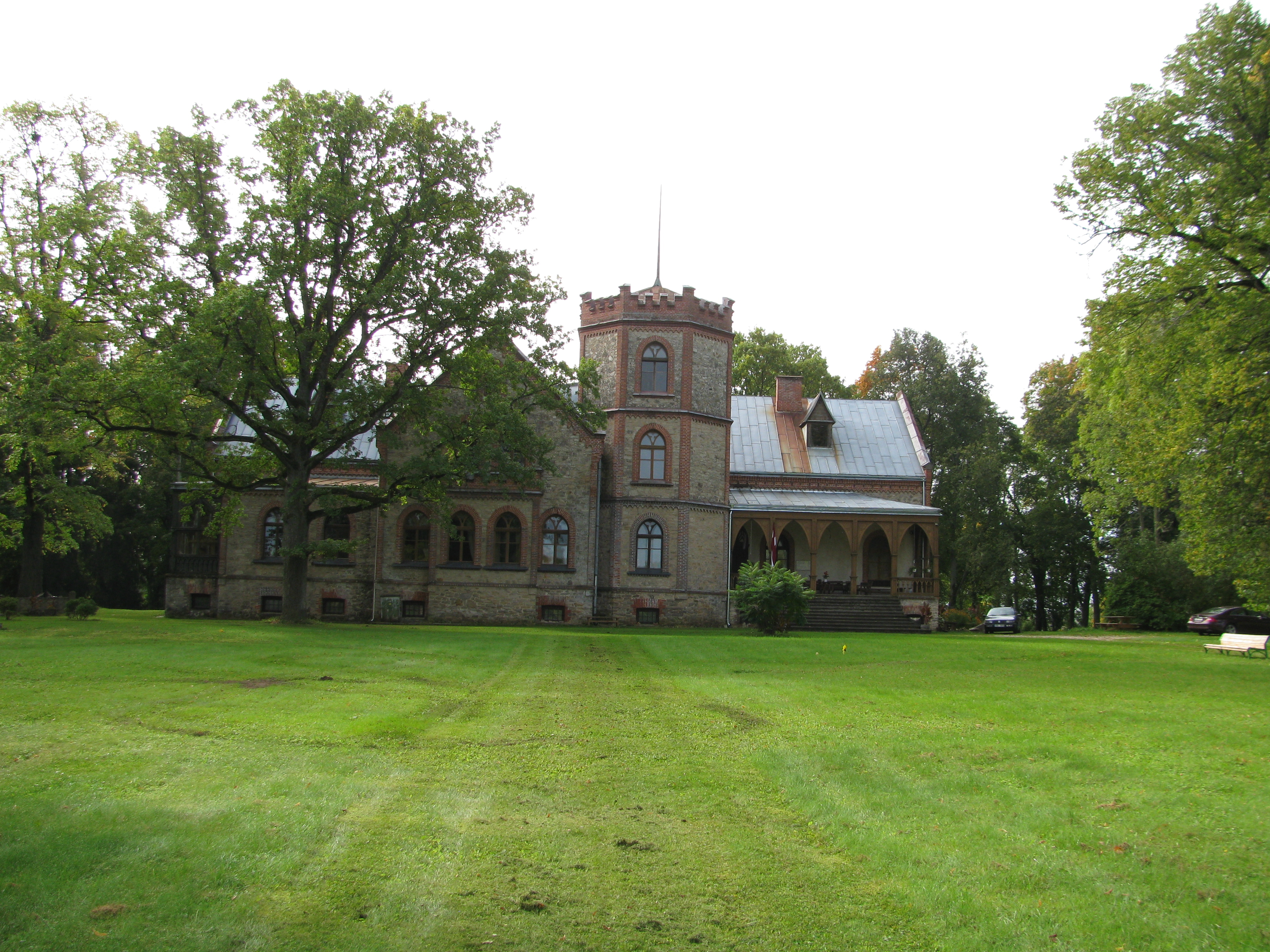
Zvārtava Manor

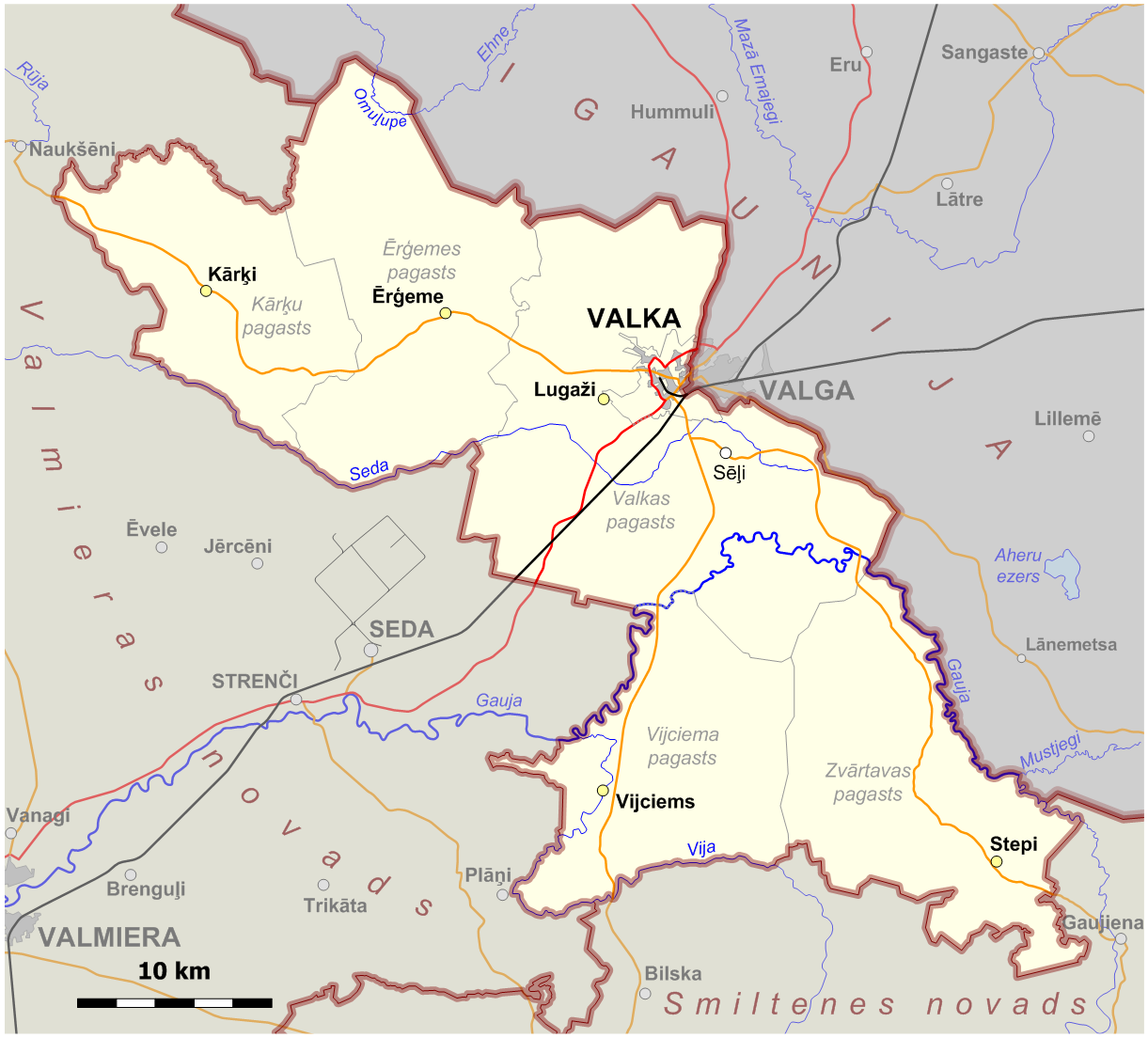
Administrative map
