= Valka Parish =

Parish of Latvia

- parish of Latvia
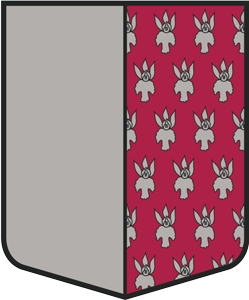
- Coat of arms

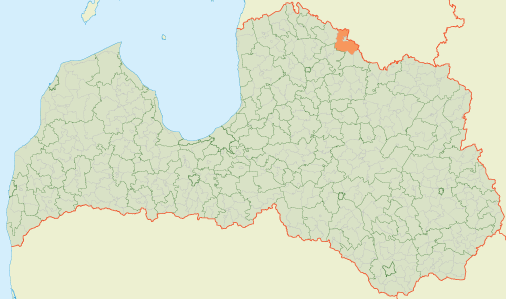
- Coordinates: 57°45′07″N 26°00′59″E
- Country: Latvia

Population (1 January 2026)
  - Total: 889
- Time zone: Eastern European Time

Valka Parish (Latvian: Valkas pagasts) is an administrative territorial entity of Valka Municipality, Latvia. It was an administrative unit of Valka district. The administrative center is Lugaži.

== Towns, villages and settlements of Valka Parish ==
- Alieši
- Bērzezers
- Lugaži
- Pedele
- Saule
- Sēļi
- Tomēni
- Zīle
