= Kesklinn, Tartu =

Neighbourhood of Tartu, Estonia

Coordinates: 58°22′44.34″N 26°43′27.66″E

Kesklinn
- Neighbourhood of Tartu
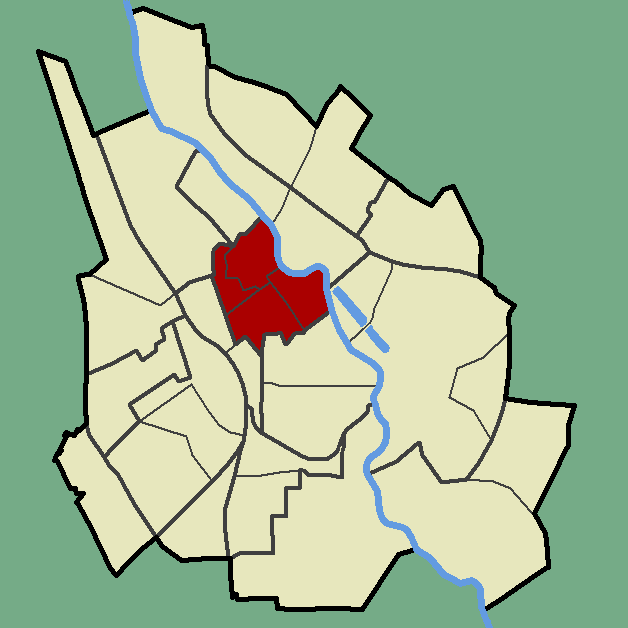
- Location of Kesklinn in Tartu.
- Country: Estonia
- County: Tartu County
- City: Tartu

Area
  - Total: 1.80 km^{2} (0.69 sq mi)

Population (31.12.2013)
  - Total: 6,517
  - Density: 3,620/km^{2} (9,380/sq mi)

Kesklinn (Estonian for "city centre") is the central district of Tartu, Estonia. It has a population of 6,517 (as of 31 December 2013) and an area of 1.80 km^{2} (0.69 mi^{2}).

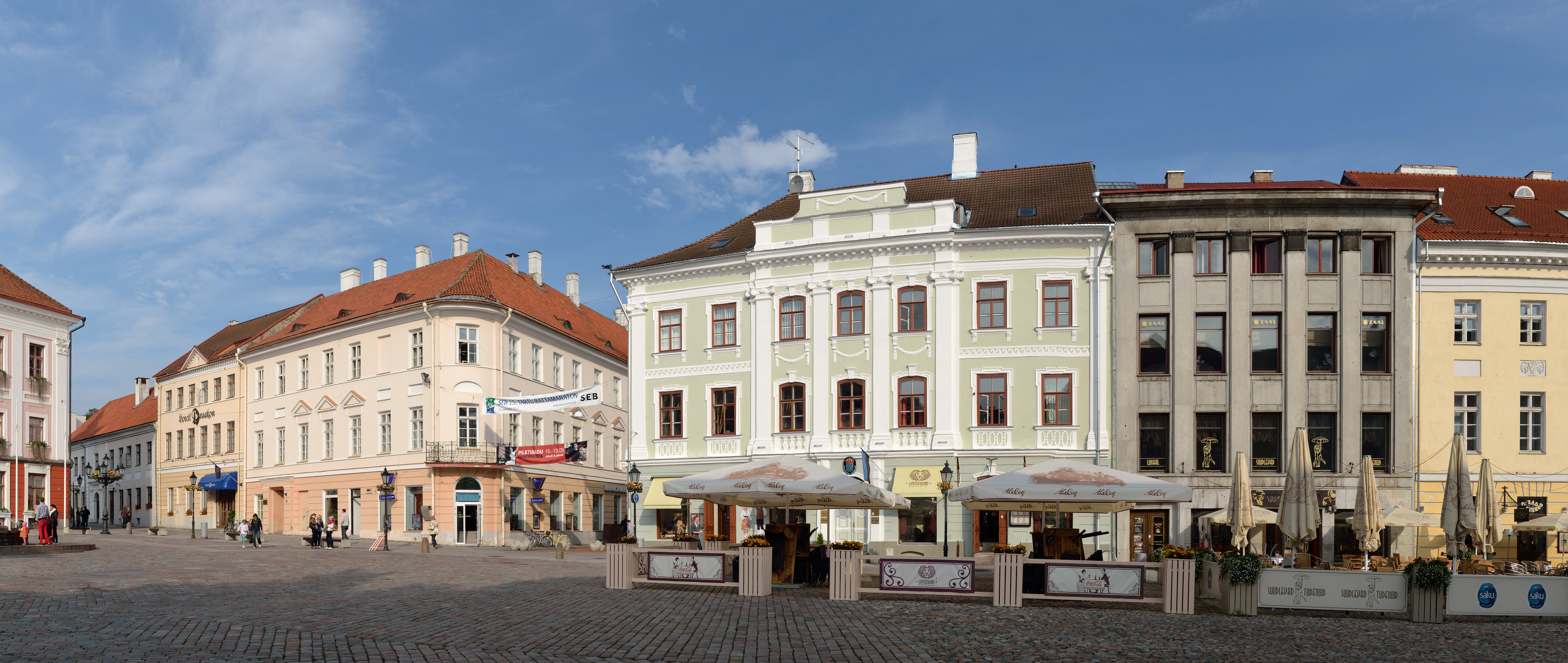
Town hall square
