= Valka =

Town and capital of Valka Municipality, Latvia

- Town
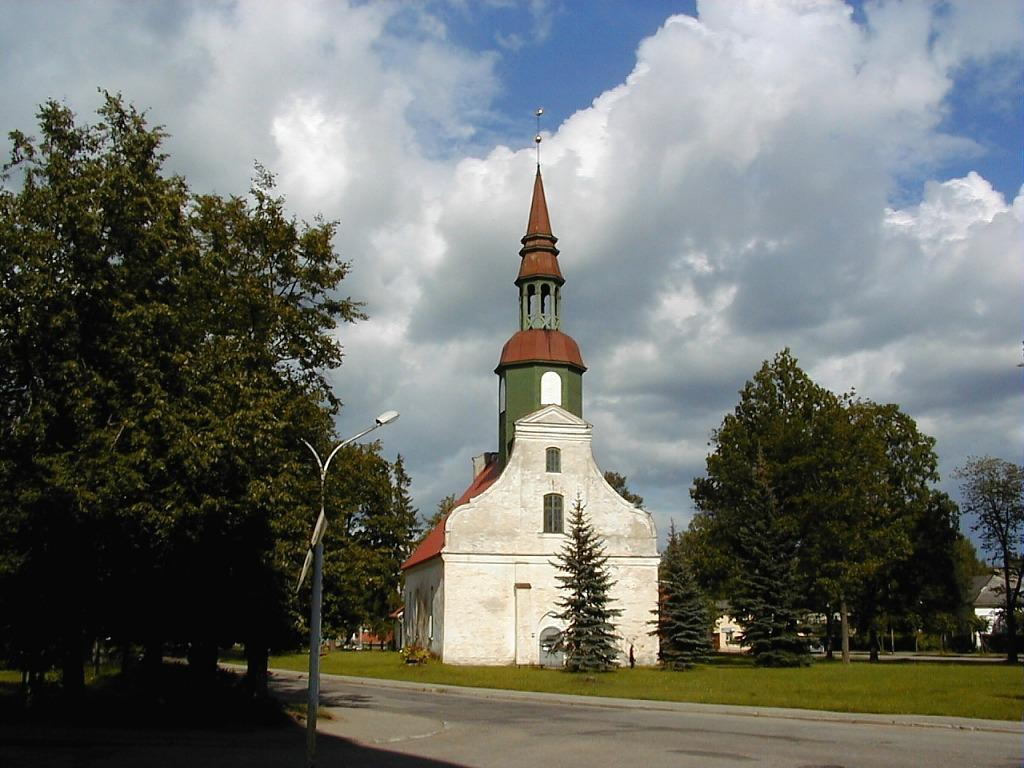
- Lugaži Lutheran Church in Valka.

- Flag Coat of arms
- Motto: 1 pilsēta, 2 valstis (1 city, 2 countries)
- Location in Latvia
- Coordinates: 57°46′N 26°0′E
- Country: Latvia
- Municipality: Valka Municipality
- Town rights: 1584

Government
  - Mayor: Vents Armands Krauklis

Area
  - Town: 14.26 km^{2} (5.51 sq mi)
  - Land: 13.88 km^{2} (5.36 sq mi)
  - Water: 0.38 km^{2} (0.15 sq mi)
- Elevation: 50 m (160 ft)

Population (2026)
  - Town: 4,562
  - Density: 328.7/km^{2} (851.3/sq mi)
  - Metro: 19,500 in Valga-Valka
- Time zone: UTC+2 (EET)
  - Summer (DST): UTC+3 (EEST)
- Postal code: LV-470(1-2)
- Calling code: +371 647
- Number of municipality council members: 15
- Website: http://www.valka.lv

Valka (German: Walk; Estonian: Valga) is a town and the centre of Valka Municipality in the Vidzeme region of Latvia, on the border with Estonia along both banks of the river Pedele.

Valka and the Estonian town Valga are twins, separated by the Estonian/Latvian border but using the slogan "One Town, Two Countries". The border dividing the Livonian town of Walk was marked out in 1920 by an international jury headed by British Colonel Stephen George Tallents.

With the expansion of the Schengen Agreement and abolition of the Estonian/Latvian border controls in 2007, it was announced that common public bus transport would be established between Valka and Valga. As of 2025, city bus number 3, operated by the Estonian company ATG Bussiliinid OÜ, connects the twin cities of Valga and Valka three times a day, departing from the Valga train station.

Also, all border crossing-points were removed and roads and fences opened. In 2016 it was announced that due to better welfare and higher salaries in Estonia, many Valka inhabitants have registered themselves as inhabitants of Valga.

== History ==
The town of Walk (in German) was first mentioned in 1286 and from 1419 was the seat of the Landtag of the Livonian Confederation. City rights were granted by the Polish-Lithuanian king Stefan Batory in 1584. However, the town gained its importance only at the end of the 19th century when the Vidzeme teacher's seminary was operating here, and the important railway junction was developed. Furthermore, the first narrow-gauge railway line in the territory of modern Latvia was stretched from Valka to Estonian city of Pärnu.

On 15 November 1917 the decision of the Latvian Provisional National Council to proclaim the independent Republic of Latvia was made in Valka. The red-white-red flag of Latvia was raised here for the first time. The town was a subject of a dispute between the newly born Latvian and Estonian states; on 1 July 1920 the town was divided between the two states as a compromise.

== Education ==
There is one primary school and a gymnasium in Valka. The Institute of Latvia-Estonia provides further education.

== Notable people ==
- Jānis Cimze (1814–1881), pedagogue, founder of Vidzeme teacher's seminary - first higher education institution in Latvia's territory
- Piers Bohl (1865–1921), mathematician and topologist
- Andris Vilks (born 1963), former Minister of Finance (2009–2014)
- Vents Armands Krauklis (born 1964), musician, politician, former mayor of Valka city (2001–2006), member of Saeima (2006–2010)
- Pavel Loskutov (born 1969), Estonian long-distance runner, multiple Olympic competitor
- Aigars Fadejevs (born 1975), Olympic race-walker, winner of silver medal at the 2000 Summer Olympics
- Arturs Neikšāns (born 1983), Latvian chess player and coach, Latvian champion
- Gatis Smukulis (born 1987), road bicycle racer

== Twin towns — sister cities ==
Valka is twinned with:

- Braslaw, Belarus
- Çamlıyayla, Turkey
- I'billin, Israel
- (Georgia (country)) Kutaisi, Georgia
- Marijampolė, Lithuania
- Novoye Devyatkino, Russia
- Valga, Estonia
- Valga, Spain

== Gallery ==
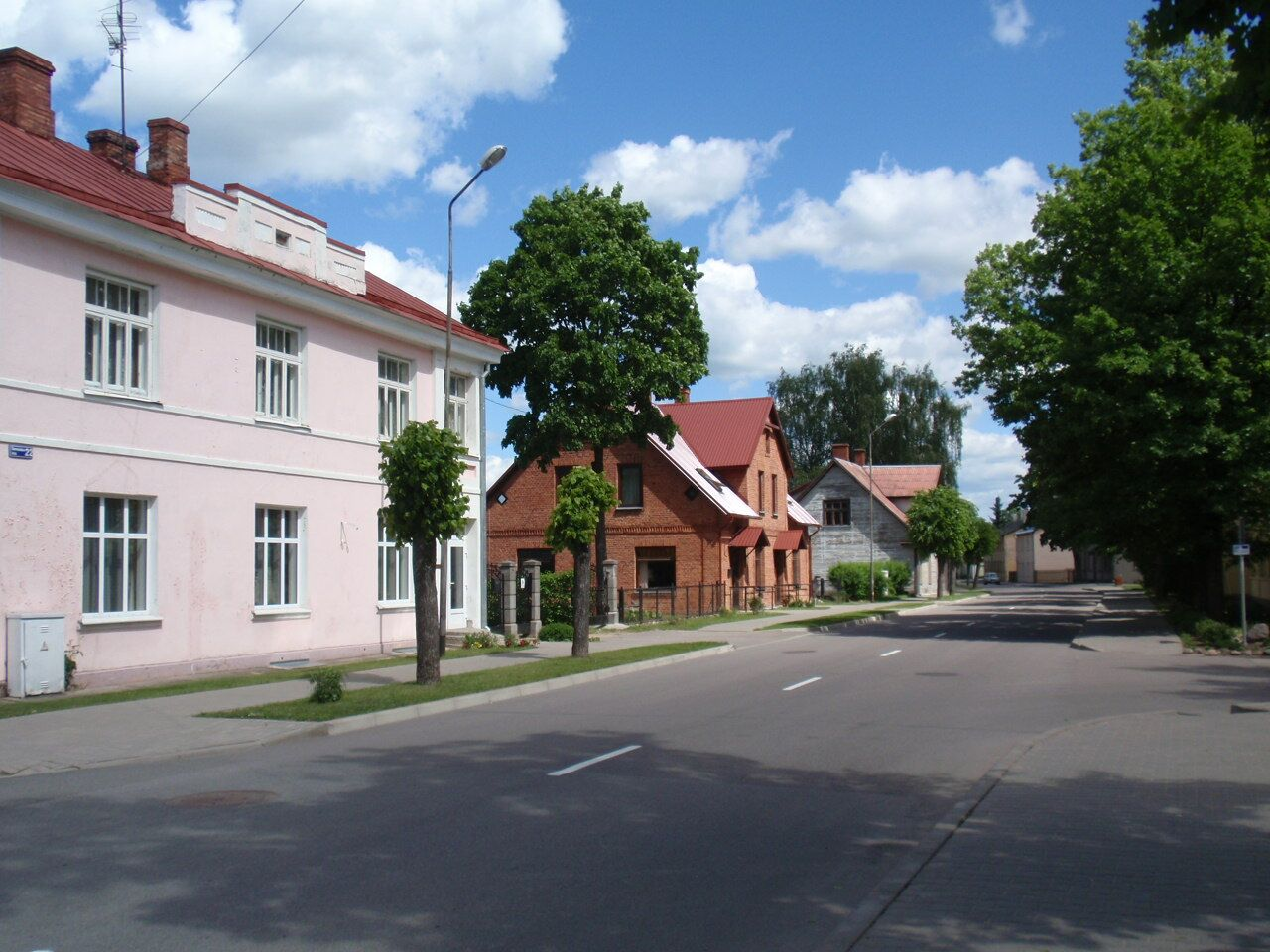
Semināra iela

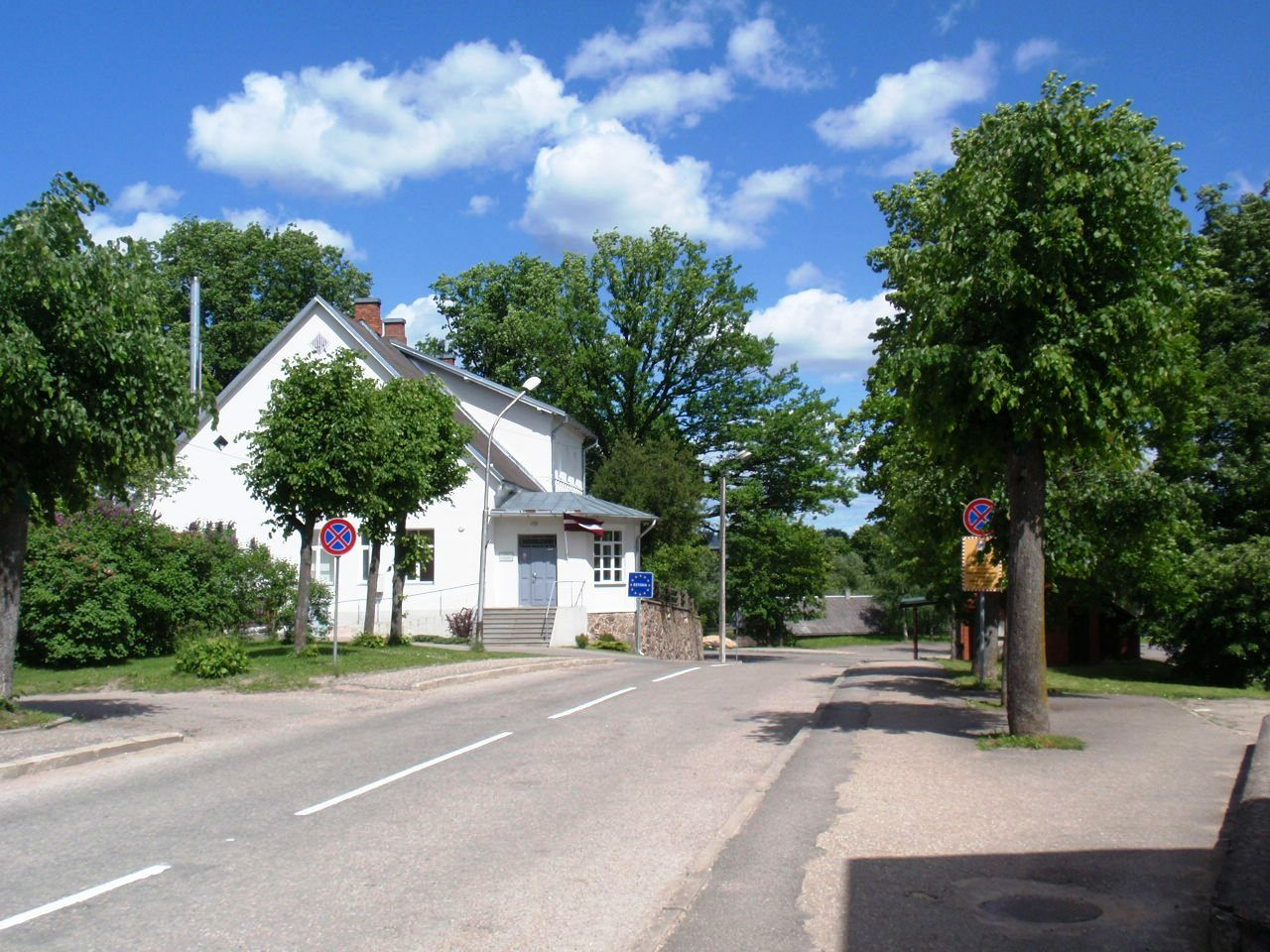
Rīgas iela (Riga Street) at the Estonian border.

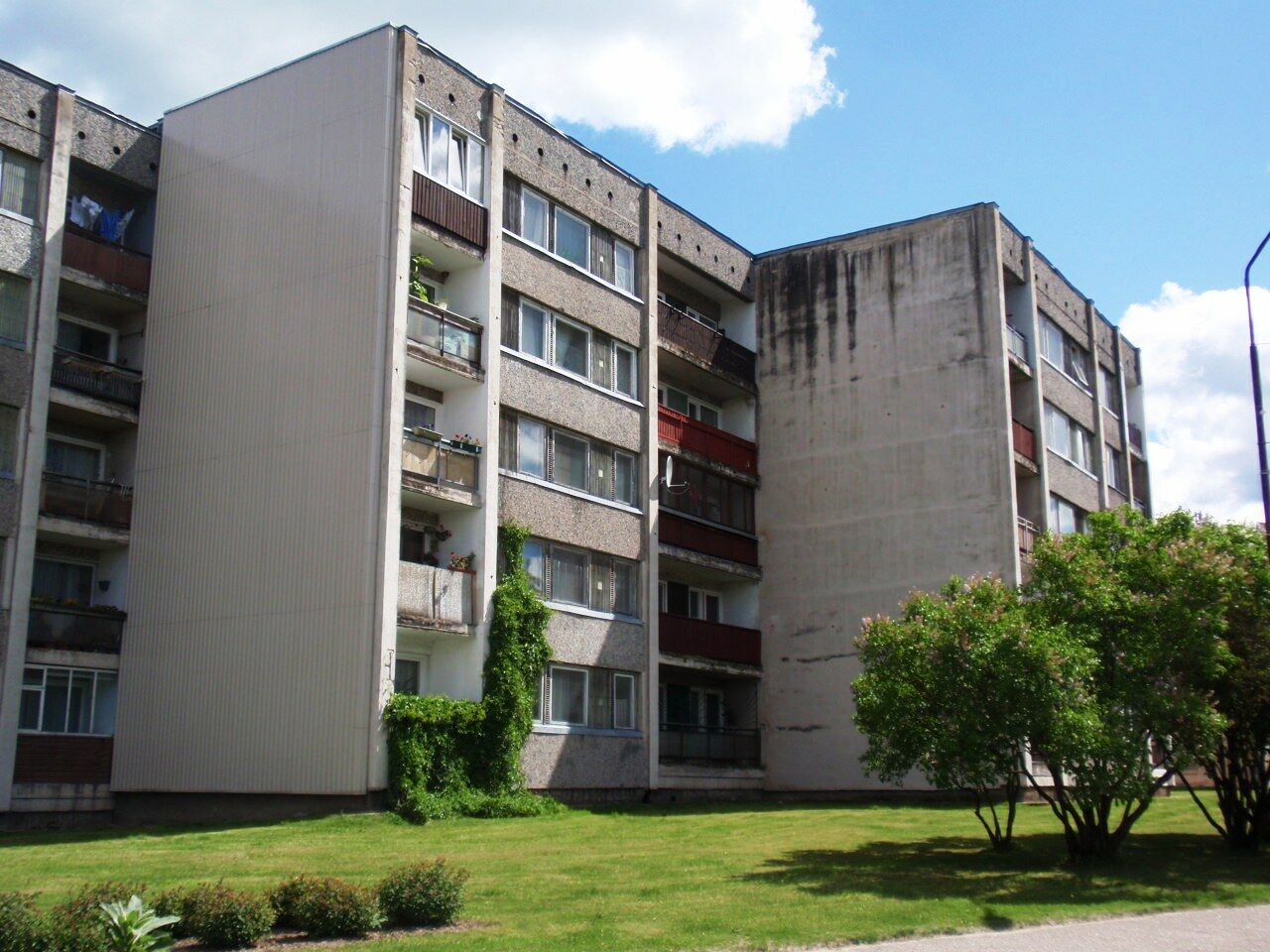
Apartment building from the Soviet era.

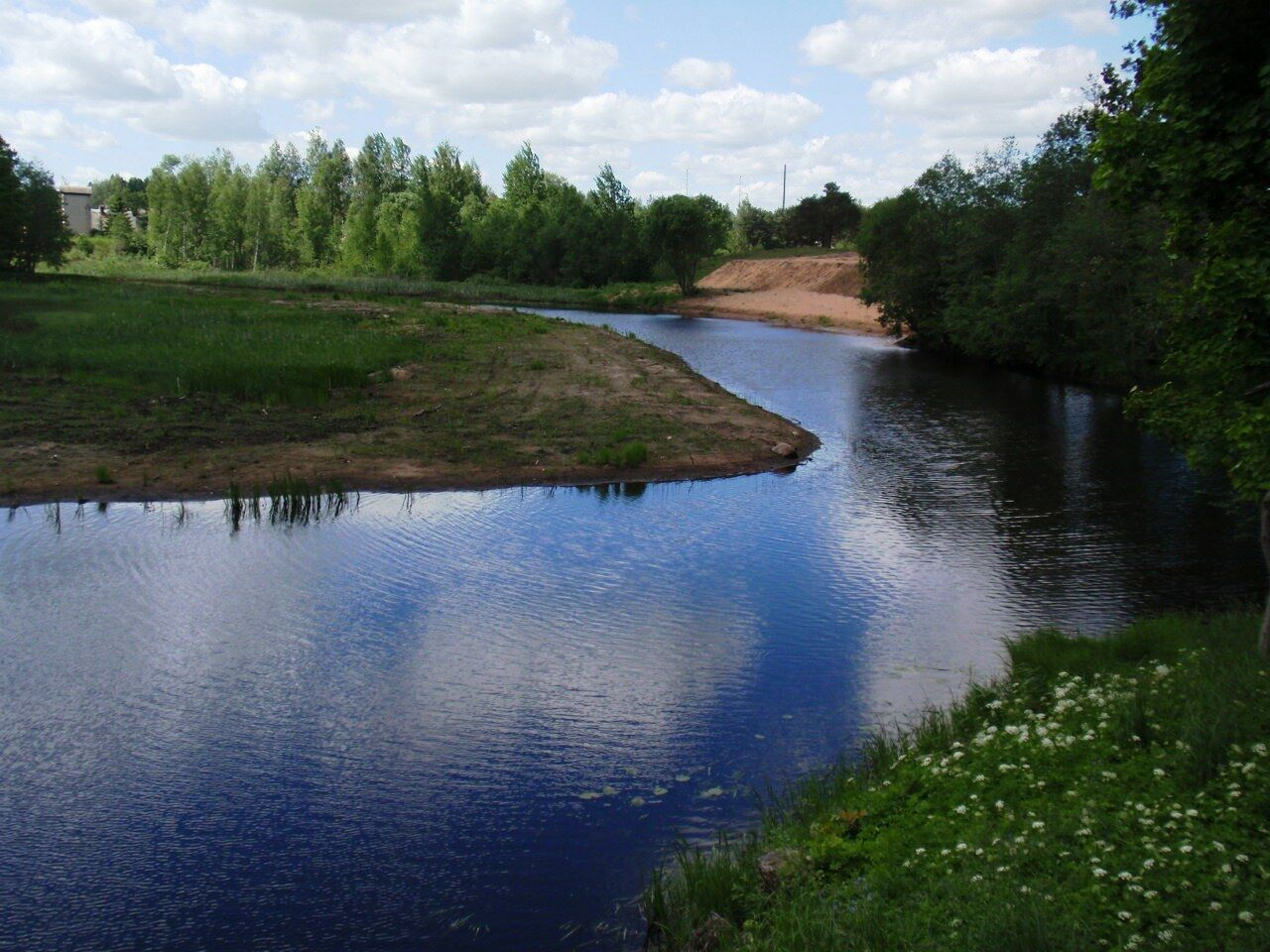
Pedele River in Valka.

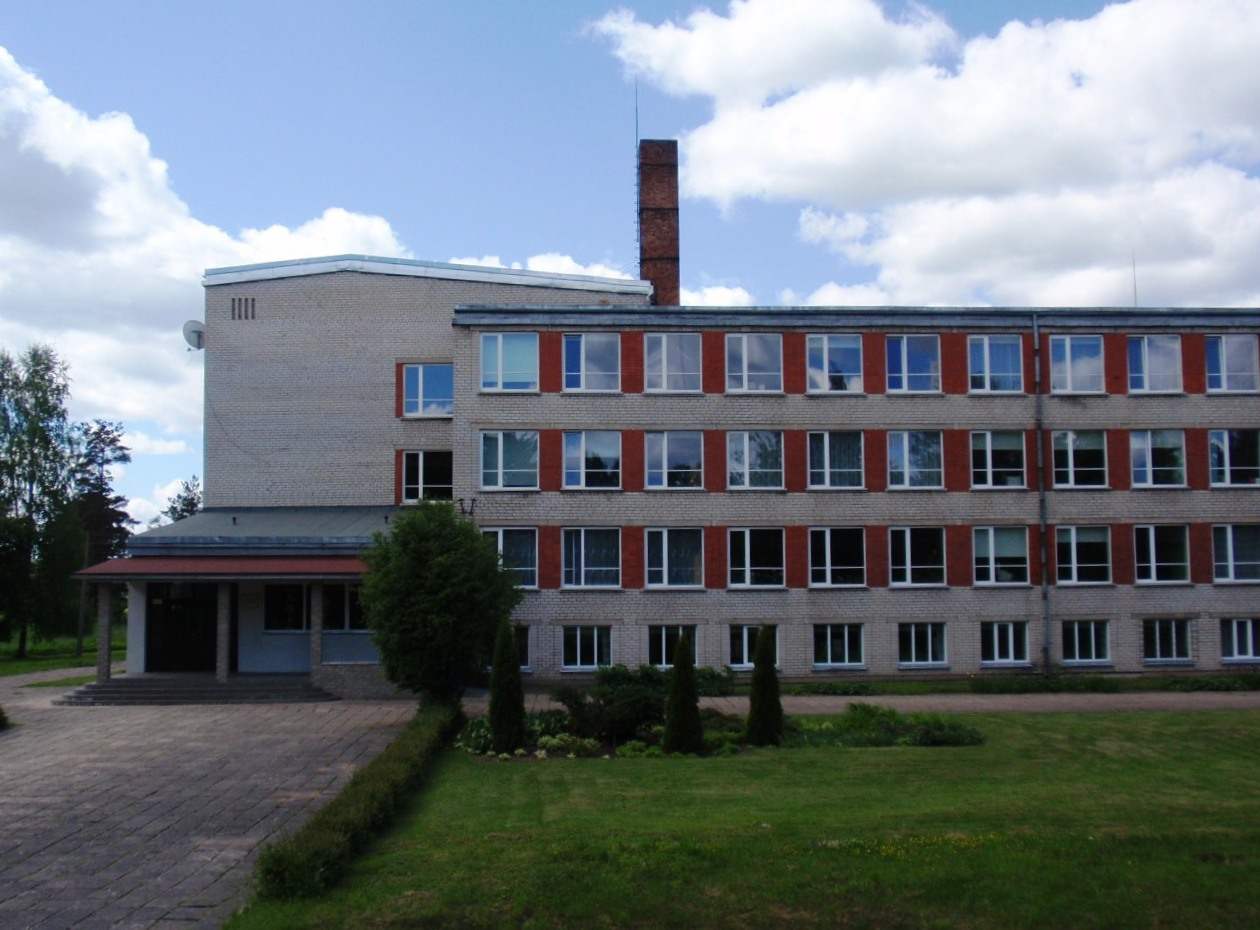
Valka Primary school

== See also ==
- Valka Town Theatre
- Valga, Estonia
