= Bishopric of Dorpat =

Medieval prince-bishopric in Livonia

Coordinates: 58°23′N 26°43′E

Bishopric of Dorpat Bishopric of Leal (1211–1235) Bistum Dorpat (German) Bisdom Dorpat (Low German) Ecclesia Tarbatensis (Latin)
- 1211–1558
- Coat of arms

- The Bishopric of Dorpat (upper right) within the Livonian Confederation, 1260
- Status: Prince-Bishopric of Terra Mariana
- Capital: Dorpat (Tartu), from 1224
- Common languages: Low German, Estonian
- Religion: Catholicism
- Government: Ecclesiastical principality
- Prince-Bishop
  - 1224–48: Hermann von Buxhövden
  - 1552–60: Hermann Wesel
- Historical era: Middle Ages
  - Established: 1211
  - Henry VII grants margraviate: 1 December 1225
  - Livonian War: 1558
| Preceded by | Succeeded by |
| Ugaunia | Duchy of Livonia (1561–1621) |

The Bishopric of Dorpat (German: Bistum Dorpat) (Note: Estonian: Tartu piiskopkond; Low German: Bisdom Dorpat; Latin: Ecclesia Tarbatensis) was a medieval prince-bishopric, i.e. both a diocese of the Catholic Church and a temporal principality ruled by the bishop of the diocese. It existed from 1211 until 1558, generally encompassing the area that now comprises Tartu County, Põlva County, Võru County, and Jõgeva County in Estonia. The prince-bishopric was a sovereign member of the Holy Roman Empire (formally from 6 Nov 1225) and part of the Livonian Confederation until its dissolution in 1561.

The state was originally established as the Bishopric of Leal in 1211, based in Leal, modern Lihula. When the Sword Brothers in 1224 captured Yuryev (modern Tartu), they renamed it Dorpat. Prince-bishop Hermann Buxhövden of Leal took up residence there and ordered the construction of the Dorpat Cathedral. Around 1235, the bishopric was renamed from Leal to Dorpat.

== History ==
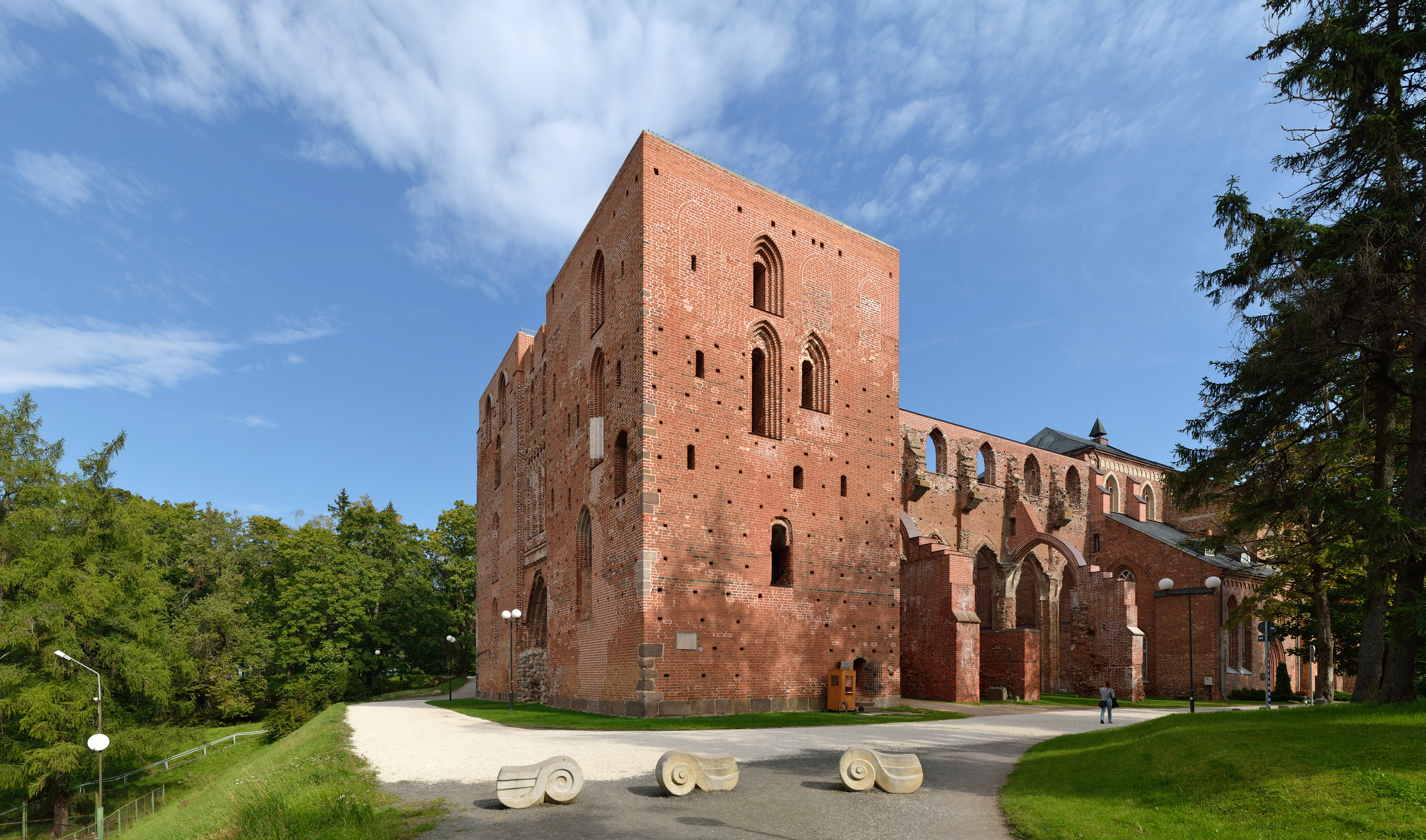
Tartu Cathedral, today in ruins, was the seat of the Bishop of Dorpat (Tartu).

The first Bishop of Dorpat (present-day Tartu) was Hermann von Buxhövden, the brother of Albert von Buxhövden, Bishop of Riga and leader of the Livonian Crusade. The Estonian Diocese was established by the Bishop of Riga in 1211 and its first nominal seat was Leal (Lihula) in western Estonia. In 1224, Bishop Hermann took possession of parts of what is today southeastern Estonia and chose Dorpat as the centre of his bishopric. On 6 November 1225, he was enfeoffed with the regalia by Henry (VII) of Germany. A further charter dated 1 December 1225 purported to elevate Hermann's territory to a march of the Holy Roman Empire. The authenticity of this provision has, however, been disputed. The principality was founded mainly on territories of the Ugaunian tribe of ancient Estonians. In 1242, Bishop Hermann with his Ugaunian subjects was defeated by Novgorod's prince Alexander Nevsky in the famous Battle on Lake Peipus.

During 1268, Fredrik, the then Bishop of Dorpat, is known to have called himself also as the "Bishop of Karelia", the background of the short-lived title remaining open.

The Bishopric of Dorpat was an important Hanseatic trade center.

At the end of the 14th century, former Dietrich Damerow became the Bishop of Dorpat. He was the archenemy of the Livonian Order and made a coalition against it with Lithuania, Mecklenburg, and the Victual Brothers (notorious pirates of the Baltic Sea). He even asked King Richard II of England to take Dorpat under his protection. The Order invaded the bishopric in 1379 with no success. After settling the conflict the Livonian Order lost its right to demand that vassals of bishoprics take part in military campaigns.

During its last years, the Bishopric of Dorpat had a dispute with Russia which became later the main pretext of the Livonian War. Tsar Ivan the Terrible demanded that the bishopric pay a huge tribute of 40,000 talers. Ivan insisted that the Dorpat was the ancient Russian fortress of Yuryev (referring to its conquest by Yaroslav the Wise). The rulers of Dorpat tried to negotiate a smaller amount in the interest of extending the truce, but Ivan dismissed the diplomats and started the war. In 1558 Tartu was conquered by Russian troops and the Bishopric of Dorpat ceased to exist.

Beside Dorpat (Tartu) there were five more stone castles in the Bishopric:

- Odenpäh (Estonian: Otepää) as the ancient centre of Ugandi and the first stone stronghold of bishopric;
- Kirrumpäh (Kirumpää) and Neuhausen (Vastseliina) by the important ancient Dorpat–Pleskau (Tartu–Pihkva) road;
- Oldentorn (Vana-Kastre) and Warbeke or Caster (Uue-Kastre) by the Emajõgi river which runs from Dorpat to Lake Peipus.

There was also an outstanding Cistercian monastery, Kärkna Abbey (also Valkena or Falkenau) near Dorpat.

== The former Bishopric today ==
The center of the bishopric was the Tartu (Dorpat) castle (Estonian: Toomemägi). The castle was damaged during the Northern War and was dismantled during the 18th century. Later (at the beginning of 19th century) an observatory was built on the site. The seat of the bishopric, Dorpat Cathedral, was damaged during the Protestant Reformation and has been in ruins since the 17th century.

== List of bishops ==
- Hermann von Buxhöwden 1224–48
- Alexander 1263–68
- Friedrich von Haseldorf 1268–88
- Bernhard I 1289–1302
- Dietrich I Vyshusen 1302–12
- Nikolaus 1312–23
- Engelbert von Dolen 1323–41
- Wescelus 1342–1344
- Johannes I Viffhusen 1346–73
- Heinrich I von Velde 1373–78
- Dietrich II Damerow 1378–1400
- Heinrich II Wrangel 1400–10
- Bernhard II Bülow 1410–13
- Dietrich III Resler 1413–41
- Bartholomäus Savijerwe 1441–59
- Helmich von Mallinckrodt 1459–68
- Andreas Pepler 1468–73
- Johannes II Bertkow 1473–85
- Dietrich V Hake 1485–98
- Johannes III von der Rope 1499–1505
- Gerhard Schrove 1505–13
- Johannes IV Duesborg 1513–14
- Christian Bomhower 1514–18
- Johannes V Blankenfeld 1518–27
- Johannes VI Bey 1528–43
- Jodokus von der Recke 1544–51
- Hermann II Wesel 1552–60

== Sources and external links ==
- World Statesmen Estonia: Prince-bishopric of Dorpat (Tartu)
- GigaCatholic Diocese of Dorpat
- Selart, Anti (2015). "Chapter 3: Livonia and Rus' in the 1230s and 1240s". Livonia, Rus' and the Baltic Crusades in the Thirteenth Century. Leiden/Boston: BRILL. pp. 127–170. doi:10.1163/9789004284753_005. ISBN 978-90-04-28475-3.
