= Hermann Wesel =

Baltic German Cistercian abbot of Kärkna Abbey in Estonia

Hermann Wesel (died June 1563) was a German ecclesiastic in Livonia, and the last Roman Catholic Bishop of Dorpat (Tartu).

== Life ==
Hermann Wesel is presumed to have originated from Wesel on the Lower Rhine. His father is supposed to have been a shoemaker.

In 1544, he was elected abbot of the Cistercian Kärkna Abbey, then known as Falkenau Abbey, in Livonia (now Estonia). On 17 October 1552 the cathedral chapter of the Bishopric of Dorpat elected him Prince-Bishop of Dorpat, as Hermann II. On 25 June 1554, the appointment was confirmed by the Pope. Wesel remained simultaneously abbot of Kärkna.

In 1558, the Livonian War broke out, and the region was overrun. The Bishopric of Dorpat was almost entirely destroyed by the Russians right at the beginning of the war, as were the small states of Livonia shortly afterwards. Dorpat capitulated on 18 July 1558.

The new Russian rulers spared Bishop Hermann's life and he was at first allowed to retire to his monastery at Kärkna. However, on 23 August 1558, Russian troops deported him into the interior of Russia where he died in 1563, the last Roman Catholic bishop of Dorpat.

== Sources ==
- Rechtfertigungsschrift vom 15. Juni 1559. In: Stefan Hartmann (Hrsg.): Herzog Albrecht von Preussen und Livland (1557–1560): Regesten aus dem Herzoglichen Briefarchiv und den Ostpreussischen Folianten. Böhlau Verlag, Köln / Weimar 2006, ISBN 978-3-41-201606-7, Nr. 2466, page 344 f.
