= Tartuff =

Film festival held in Tartu, Estonia

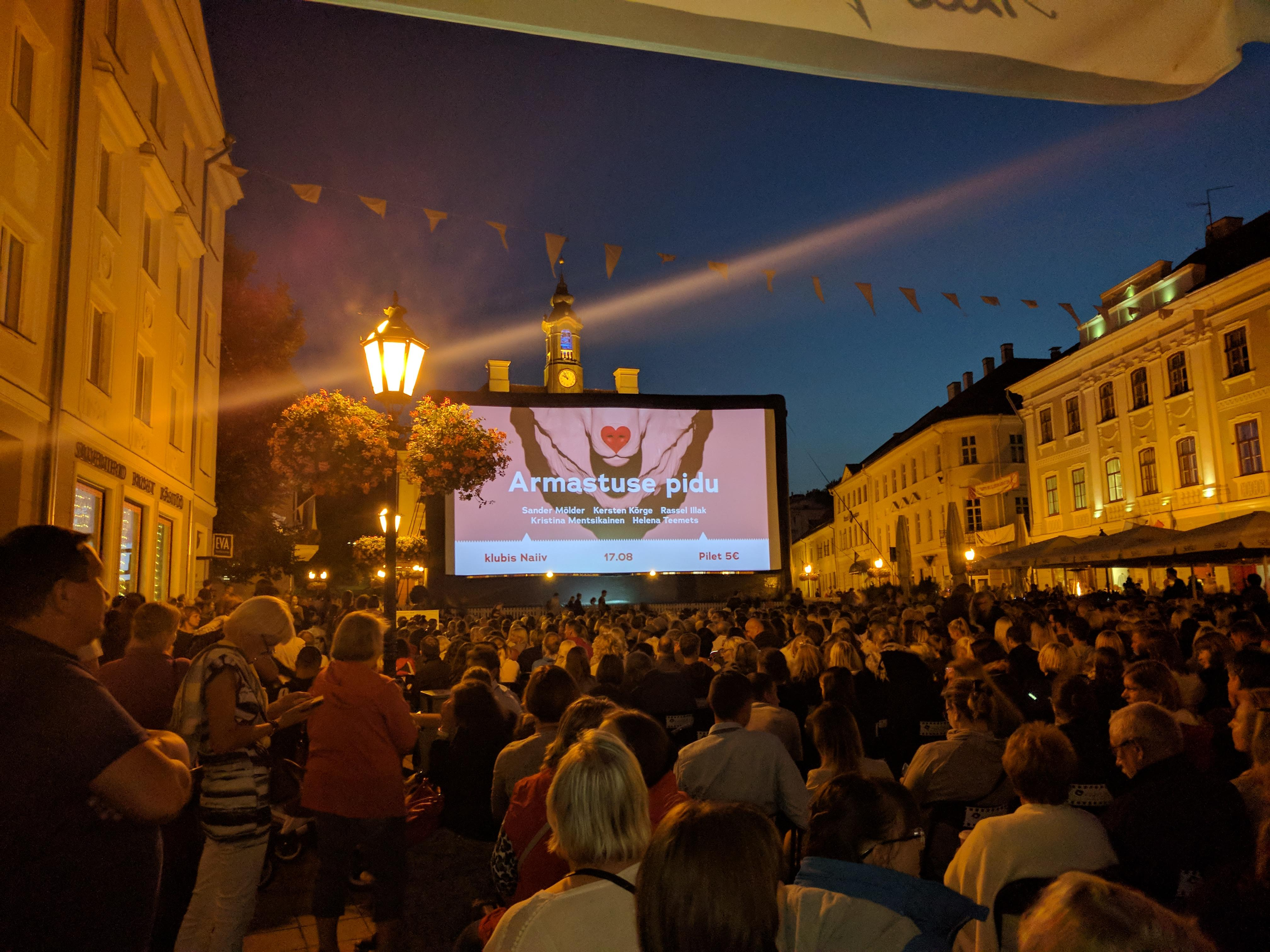
Tartuff (2018)

Tartuff (originally tARTuFF) is an annual romance film festival held since 2006 every August in Tartu, the second biggest city in Estonia.

Tartuff is organized by the Black Nights Film Festival and it takes place in Tartu Town Hall Square (Raekoja plats), where films are shown on a big screen free of charge. In addition, documentaries are shown in the Athena Center. The film programme is supported by discussions and lectures during the day. Viewers are invited to choose their favourite among the films screened.

Tartuff is the biggest open-air film festival in the Baltics.

== History ==
Tartuff was created by Black Nights Film Festival together with HÕFF in 2006. The idea came from the founder of PÖFF Tiina Lokk-Tramberg, who based it on a similar film festival in Vienna.

The first Tartuff in 2006 screened 24 films and the TV miniseries Dekalog by Polish director Krzysztof Kieślowski. Nearly 10,000 attended the festival, as well as a one-day conference on cultural tolerance. Pedro Almodóvar's Volver was voted audience favourite.

The second Tartuff in 2007 screened 24 films. 10 000 attended the showings and a two-day conference on "The tolerants of religion". Hal Ashby's Harold and Maude was voted audience favourite.

The third Tartuff in 2008 screened 24 films. 16,163 attendees enjoyed the films and a photo contest "Love of Tartu". Taarka by Ain Mäeots, about Seto folk singer Hilana Taarka, premiered and was voted audience favourite.

The fifth Tartuff in 2010 scored 30,428 attendees. Jerzy Sladkowski's Paradise was voted audience favourite.

=== Visitor numbers ===
Year	Films shown	Visitors
2006	24	10 000
2007	24	10 000
2008	24	16 163
2009	24	17 100
2010	22	30 428
2011	27	21 337
2012	26	17 930
2013	19	22 000
2014	15	25 000
2015	16	19 500
2016	19	18 000
2017	18	17 000
2018	16	19 300
2019	11	15 000
2020	17	7 500
2021	17	8 000
2022	17	11 600
2023	20	9 000

== Awards ==
Visitors can vote for their favorite film online. Public's favorite film is awarded Mati Karmin's sculpture "Suudlevad Tudengid" ("Kissing Students"), a copy of a sculpture that lies in the middle of Tartu Town Hall Square.

=== Public favourites ===
Year	Film	Original Title	Director(s)	Country of Director
2006	Volver	Volver	Pedro Almodóvar	Spain
2007	Harold and Maude	Harold and Maude	Hal Ashby	USA
2008	Taarka	Taarka	Ain Mäeots	Estonia
2009	Glasses	Megane	Naoko Ogigami	Estonia
2010	Paradise	Paradise	Jerzy Sladkowski	Poland
2011	Waste Land	Waste Land	Lucy Walker	United Kingdom
2012	Café de Flore	Café de Flore	Jean-Marc Vallée	Canada
2013	The Perks of Being a Wallflower	The Perks of Being a Wallflower	Stephen Chbosky	USA
2014	Corrections Class	Класс коррекции / Klass korrektsii	Ivan Tverdovskiy	Russia
2015	X+Y	X+Y	Morgan Matthews	United Kingdom
2016	Sing Street	Sing Street	John Carney	Ireland
2017	Tanna	Tanna	Martin Butler	Australia
2017	Tanna	Tanna	Bentley Dean	Australia
2018	Becoming Astrid	Unge Astrid / Unga Astrid	Pernille Fischer Christensen	Denmark
2019	Always and Forever	Immer und ewig	Fanny Bräuning	Switzerland
2020	The Goddess of Fortune	La dea fortuna	Ferzan Özpetek	Italy / Turkey
2021	Diana's Wedding	Dianas bryllup	Charlotte Blom	Germany
2022	Secret Name	La place d'une autre	Aurélia Georges	France
2023	The Sales Girl	Khudaldagch ohin	Janchivdorj Sengedorj	Mongolia
2024	Chainsaws Were Singing	Mootorsaed laulsid	Sander Maran	Estonia
2025	Sunshine	Sunshine	Antoinette Jadaone	Philippines
