= Von Bock House =

Building in Tartu, Estonia

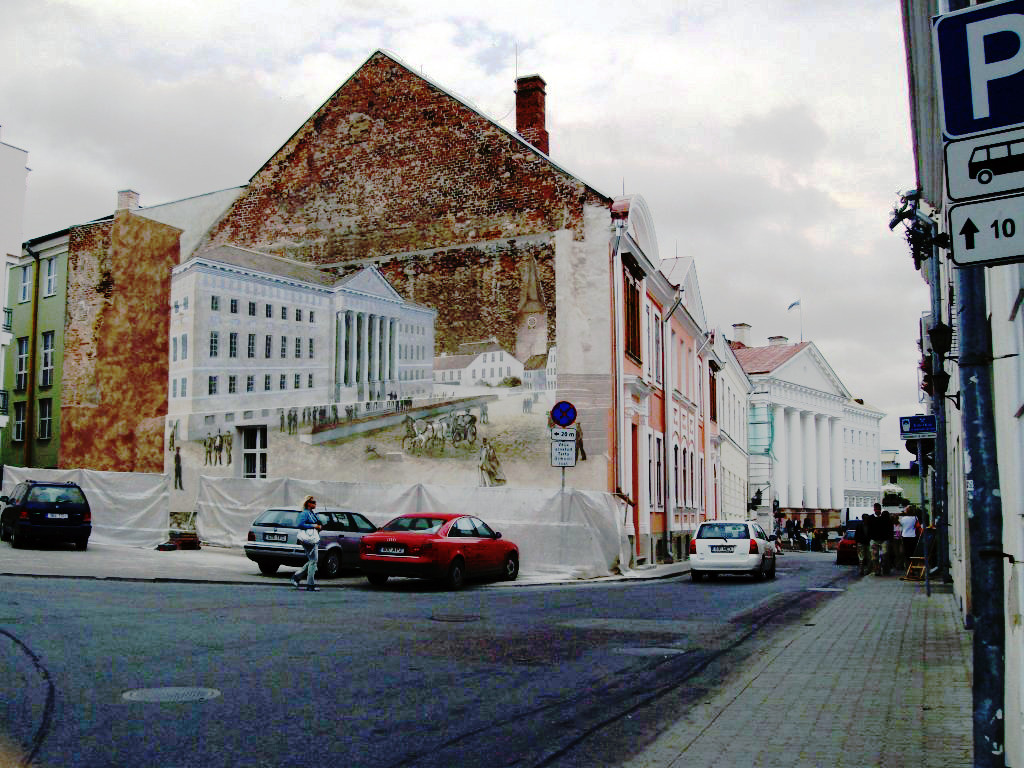
- Von Bock House in Ülikooli Street
- Interactive map of the Von Bock House area

General information
- Location: 16 Ülikooli Street, Tartu, Estonia
- Coordinates: 58.3806°N 26.7205°E
- Completed: 1786
- Renovated: 2007
- Renovation cost: 3m kroons
- Owner: Christina Wilcke

Design and construction
- Architect: Johann Heinrich Bartholomäus Walther

Renovating team
- Architect: Merje Müürisepp

Von Bock House is in Ülikooli Street in Tartu in Estonia. The building is owned by Tartu University, and is on the same street as the university's main building. Von Bock house has a mural of the university's main building on one of its walls.

== History ==
The building was commissioned following the Great Fire of Tartu (then called Dorpat) which consumed the wooden buildings of the city in 1775. The builder's German born architect was Johann Heinrich Bartholomäus Walther who also worked on Tartu Town Hall which was nearby. The house was built for Christina Wilcke and was nominally complete by 1780.

The building is named for Colonel Magnus Johann von Bock who owned the building. The Saare Manor of the Bock family was situated in Jõgeva County. The building was described as being 147 by 45 (Rhein) feet in area. It started with a vaulted basement and a ground floor that was dedicated to service and which was also partially vaulted. The first floor had a large room with an extravagant plastered ceiling designed for entertaining. However the Bock family had agreed for the building to be used by Tartu University. New building work was approved and it was agreed to construct a library, lecture rooms and a place for public debate. The building was adapted in 1783 to 1786.

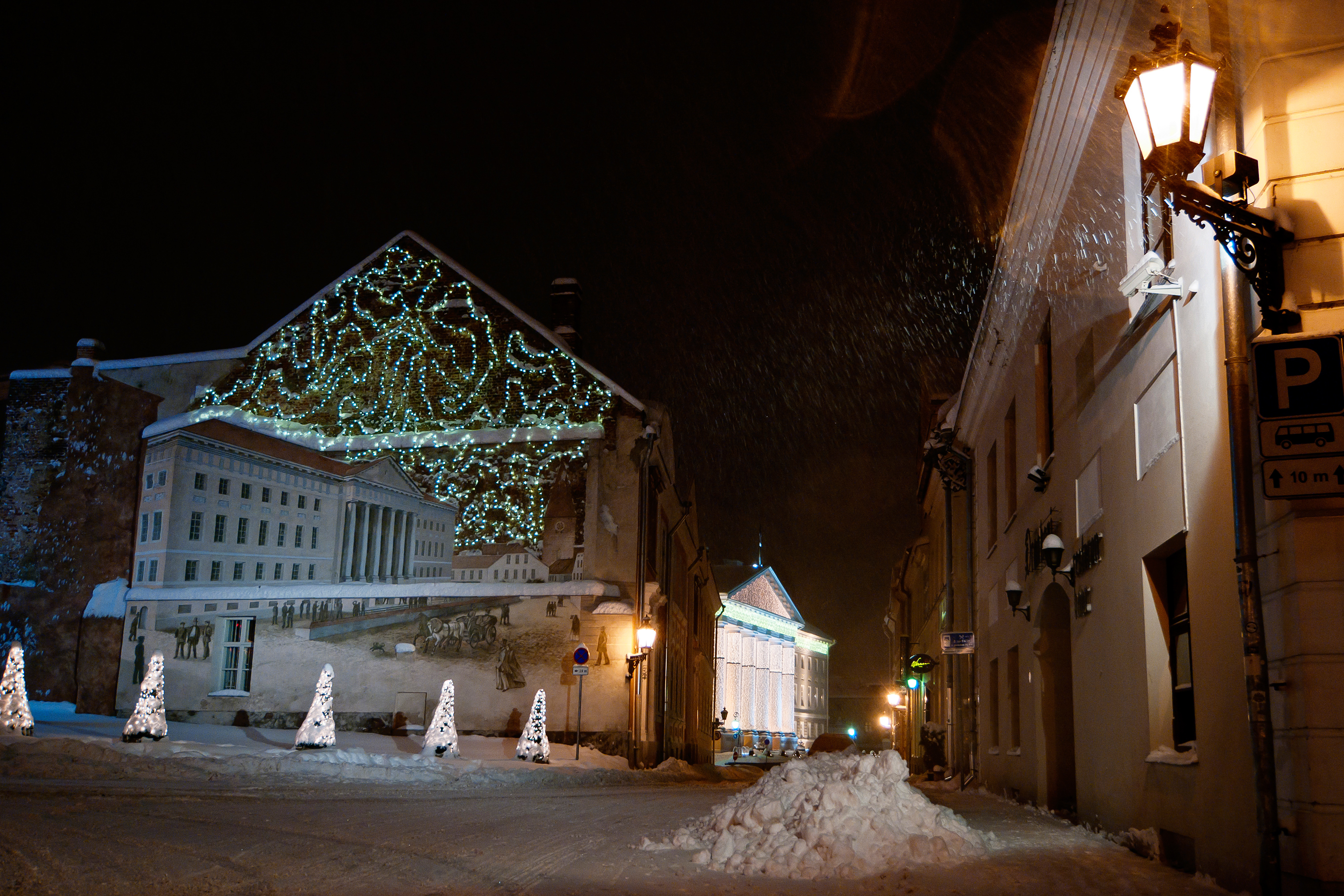
With special Christmas lights

The new project commissioned artists and decorators who covered the staircase and surrounding areas in a bold black and white check pattern that was said to match the arabesque stucco of the upper floor ceiling. One room was wallpapered with a floral design that also included three large landscape murals. The hall had a white fancy ceiling whilst the walls were covered in another arabesque design around the five large windows with two white tiled stoves to provide heating. The new German speaking University was re-launched and had its new charter was confirmed by Alexander I of Russia in 1802.

M.J. von Bock died in 1807 and the converted building was bought by the University of Tartu in 1839. The house has had a series of different roles since then including the University's medical facility, a veterinary school, and the library of the Estonian Learned Society. The learned society had been founded in 1839 with the aim of investigating and improving culture in Estonia. The society's first activity was to create education for the local population.

== 2007 renovation and another mural ==
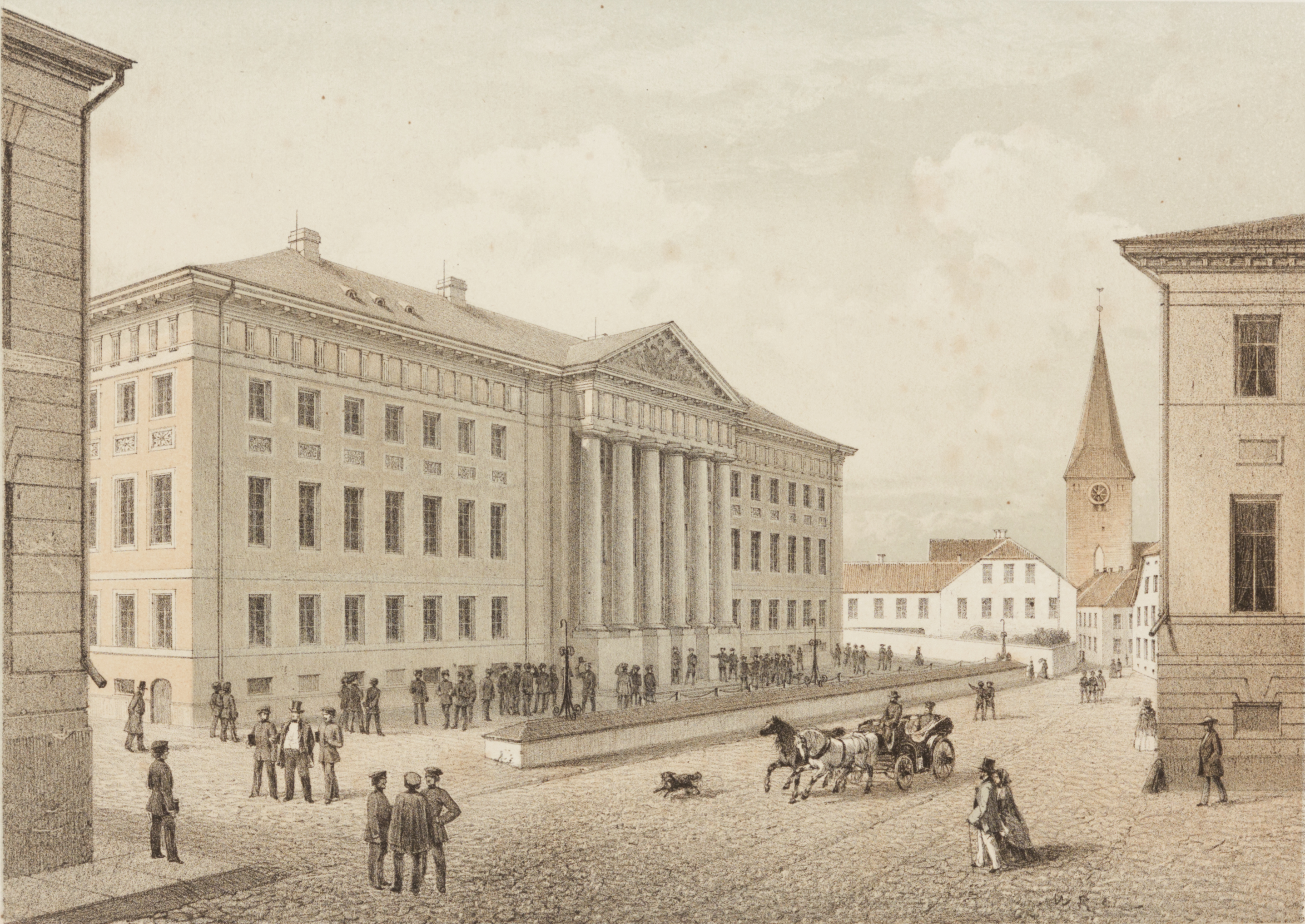
The original 1860 coloured lithograph by Louis Höflinger

Today the building is still owned by the university and in 2006 to 2007 the building was renovated under the managemement of Merje Müürisepp. Müürisepp had the facade restored to light yellow and the rest of the building painted a dark pink. A vast external mural was constructed on the side of the house. The mural was a reproduction of a lithograph by Louis Höflinger who had lived in Tartu around 1860. The Art Museum of Estonia has a large collection of his work. The design was prepared by Maarja Roosi. The mural shows the main building of the University of Tartu exactly as it was recorded in 1860 by Höflinger. It was constructed by students under the supervision of university staff.

The mural was accompanied by an exhibition of photographs that was shown at the windows of the house in 2007. The photographs were arranged by Alan Madisson and featured notable academics from the university.

The renovation of the house was completed at a cost of three million kroons in September 2007. Four years after the renovation the plasterwork of the building developed cracks which seemed to have been caused by subsistence.

This subject of the mural, the University's main building, is further down Ülikooli Street and it is possible to view both the mural and the main building at the same time.
