= Ülikooli Street =

Street in Tartu, Estonia

Coordinates: 58°22′46.07″N 26°43′20.07″E

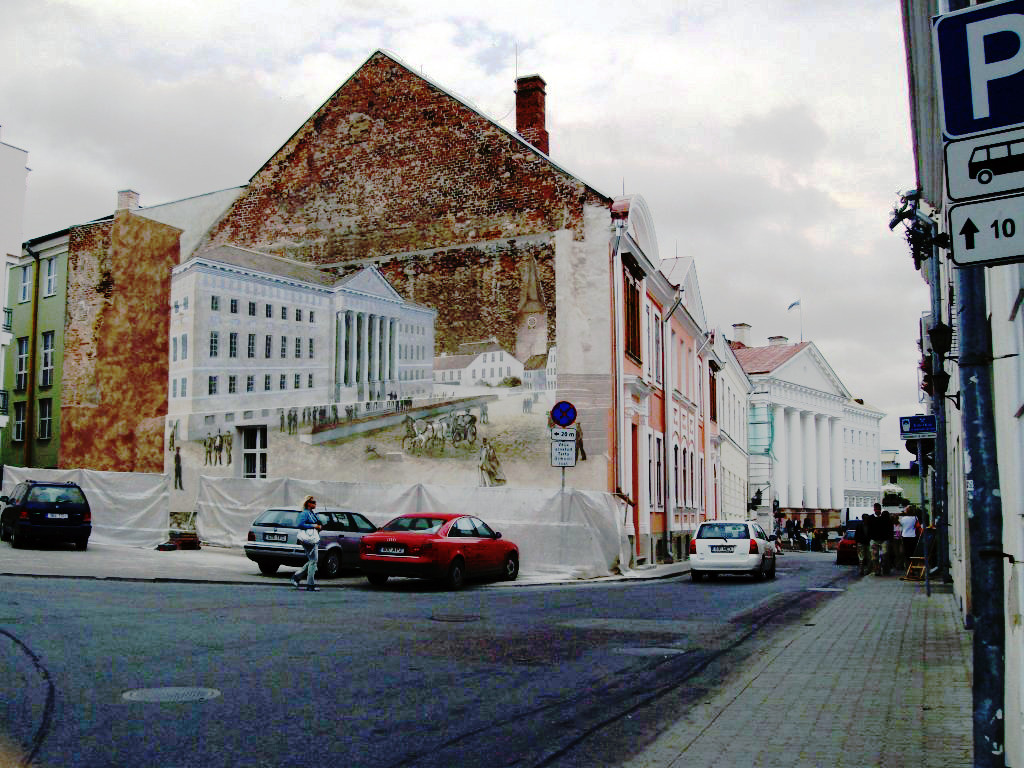
Von Bock House in Ülikooli Street

The Ülikooli Street (Estonian: Ülikooli tänav, University Street) is a street in the center of Tartu in Estonia. Named after the University of Tartu whose main building is located on this street (18 Ülikooli str.), it runs through the business district, passes behind the Town Hall building, and hosts a number of university-related facilities, including the university cafe (20 Ülikooli str.), Von Bock House, the university book shop (11 Ülikooli str.) and the old Faculty of Chemistry building, which is also called the Marx Building (16 Ülikooli str.). The Barclay Square, location of the Barclay de Tolli bust, and the Pirogov park, location of the Nikolay Pirogov statue, are adjacent to the street.

The street has also been named as "Silicon Alley" because of the high concentration of information technology companies.
