= List of squares in Estonia =

This is the list of squares located in Estonia. The list is incomplete.

Name	Location (county, city/town)	Area	Further info	Image
Barclay Square	Tartu County, Tartu			
Central Square	Hiiu County, Kärdla			
Central Square	Järva County, Paide			
Central Square	Pärnu County, Pärnu			
Freedom Square, Tallinn	Harju County, Tallinn	7752 m^{2}		
Iceland's Square	Harju County, Tallinn			
Leiger's Square	Hiiu County, Kärdla			
Peter's Square	Ida-Viru County, Narva			
Raekoja plats, Tallinn	Harju County, Tallinn			
Raekoja plats, Tartu	Tartu County, Tartu			
Tallinn Song Festival Grounds	Harju County, Tallinn			
Theatre's Square	Harju County, Tallinn			
Towers' Square	Harju County, Tallinn			
Town Hall Square	Ida-Viru County, Narva			
Viru Square	Harju County, Tallinn			
Virula Square	Ida-Viru County, Kohtla-Järve			
