= Tartu Old Town =

Oldest part of Tartu

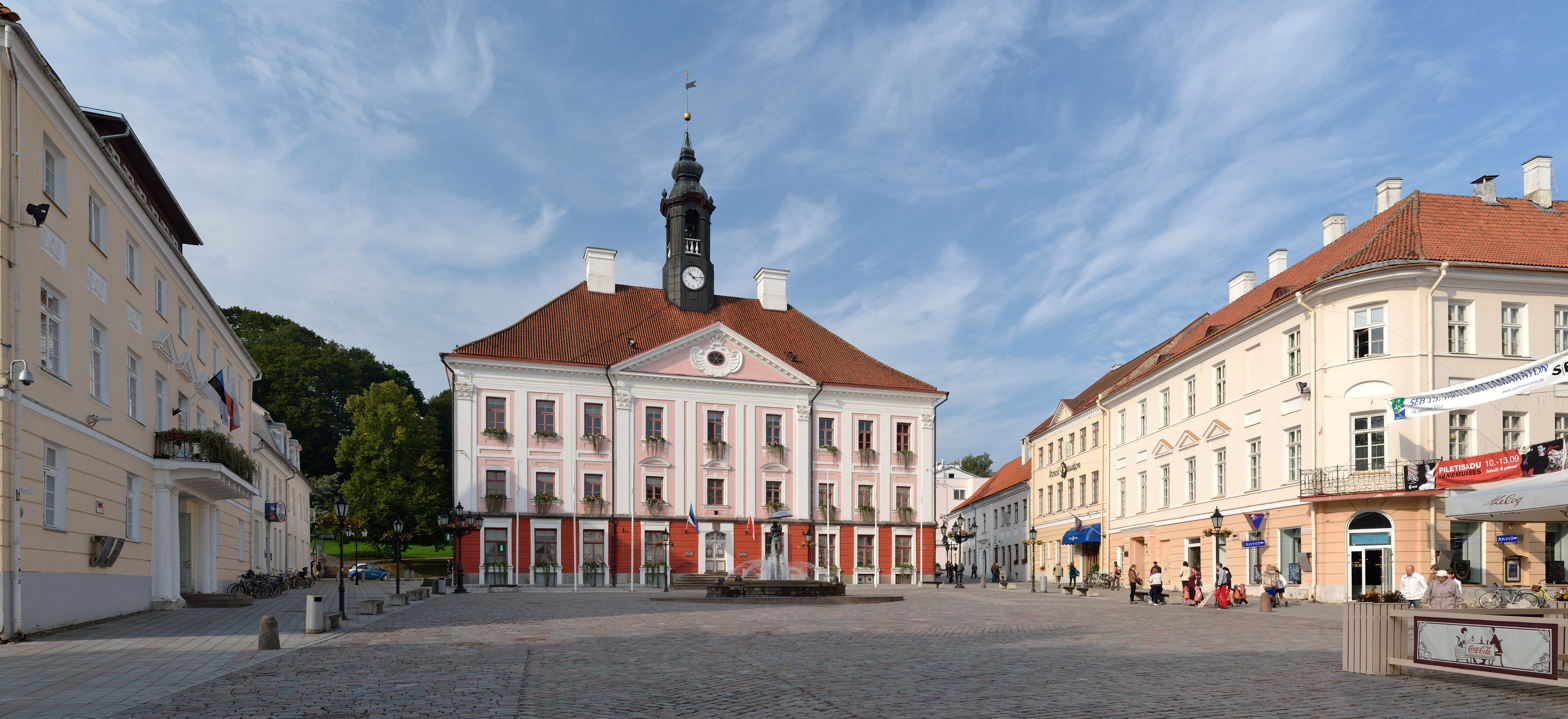
Raekoja plats in 2012

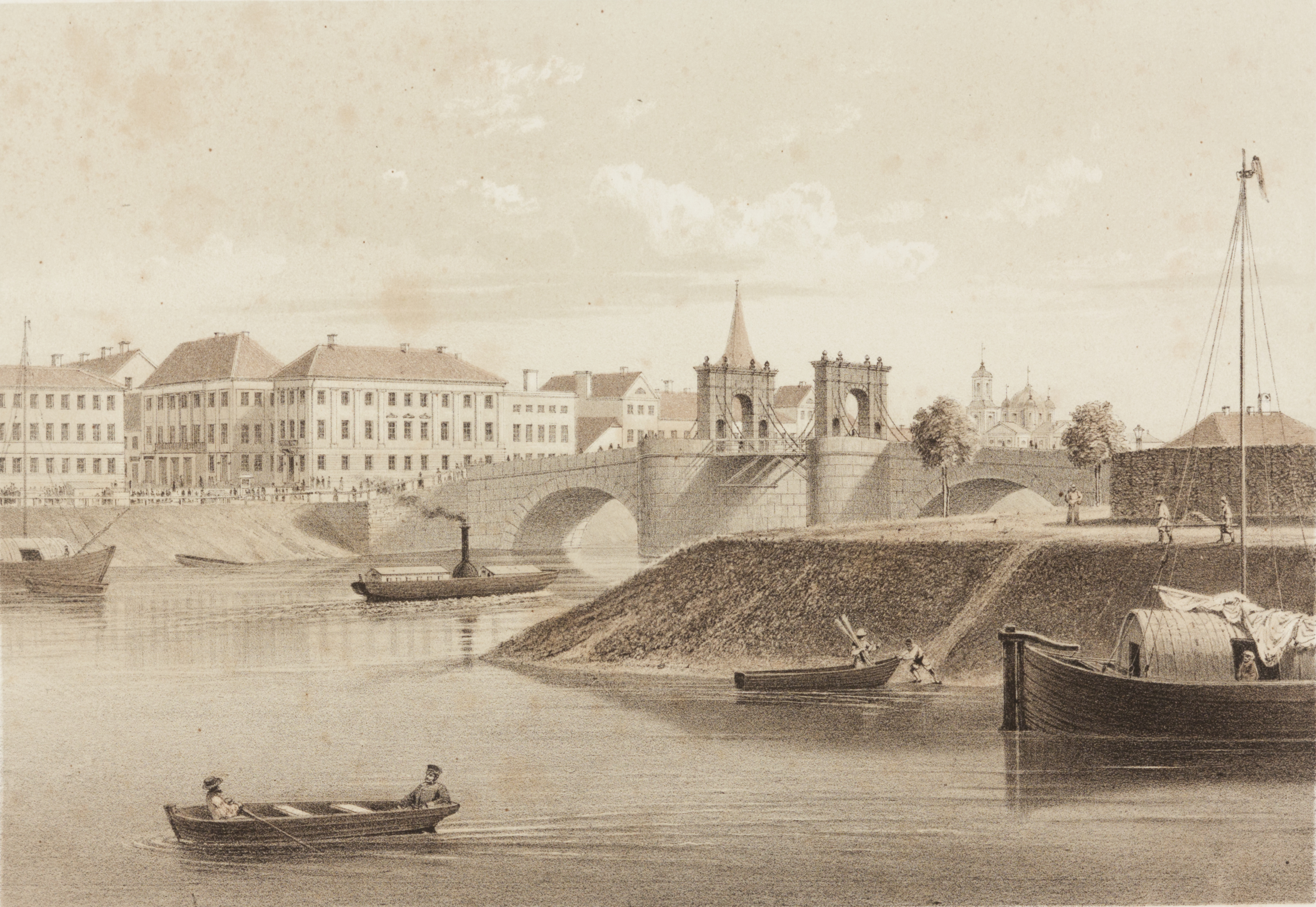
Stone Bridge and Tartu Old Town in 1860

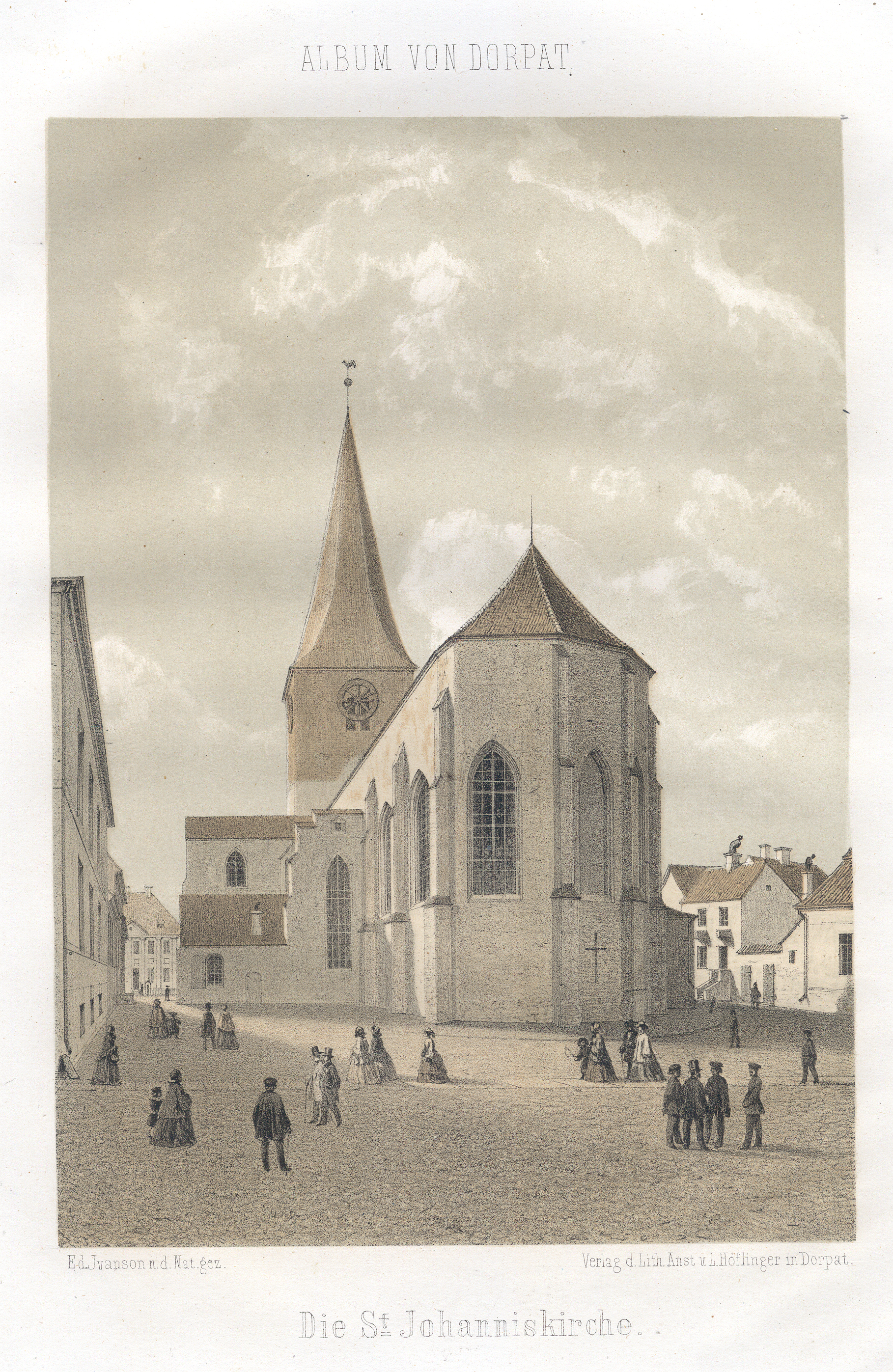
St. John's Church in 1860

Tartu Old Town (Estonian: Tartu vanalinn) is the oldest part of Tartu, Estonia.

The centre of the old town is Raekoja plats.

In 1775 the Great Fire of Tartu occurred and almost all infrastructure was destroyed. Today's old town consists of mainly buildings which are built from the late 18th and early 19th centuries.

The old town is protected via Tartu heritage conservation area (Estonian: Tartu muinsuskaitseala).

== Notable buildings ==
- Tartu Cathedral
- Main building of Tartu University
- St. John's Church, Tartu
