= Annika Co =

Filipino child actress

- Born: September 23, 2016 (age 9); Muntinlupa, Philippines
- Occupation: Actress
- Years active: 2023–present
- Agent: Viva Artists Agency

Annika Co (born September 23, 2016) is a Filipino child actress. She became known to the public in 2023 after appearing on the variety show It's Showtime. Following her television appearance, she began a career in film and is currently managed by Viva Artists Agency.

== Career ==
=== Early work ===
Co's parents, Adrian and An Co, initially enrolled her in acting workshops under Star Magic to help build her confidence. She also appeared in videos on her family's YouTube channel and was featured in a vlog by broadcaster Bernadette Sembrano.

=== Television breakthrough ===
In July 2023, Co participated in "Mini Ms. U", a segment for young girls on the ABS-CBN program It's Showtime. During the competition, she performed an improvised acting skit with host Vice Ganda. In the scene, she comforted the host who was pretending to have stage fright.

Her dialogue in the skit, where she stated that one should be "the best version of yourself", received significant attention on social media. The performance drew an emotional reaction from co-host Anne Curtis, who praised the child's kindness. Co was named the daily winner of the segment by judges Janice de Belen, Gladys Reyes, and Niño Muhlach.

=== Acting career ===
Following her appearance on It's Showtime, Co signed a management contract with Viva Artists Agency on August 8, 2023. By 2025, she began appearing in film projects. She was cast in the film Sunshine, directed by Antoinette Jadaone and starring Maris Racal.

In August 2025, Co starred in the short film Blooming!, which was an entry in the SineKabataan film festival. In this project, she played the role of Nena, a Grade 5 student.

== Personal life ==
Annika Co is from Muntinlupa, Philippines. She is homeschooled, with her mother acting as her teacher. In a 2025 interview, Co stated that she hopes to study at the Juilliard School when she reaches college.

== Filmography ==
=== Film ===
Year	Title	Role	Notes	Ref.
2023	Penduko	Yap Yap	Directed by Jason Paul Laxamana	
2024	Sunshine	Girl	Directed by Antoinette Jadaone	
2025	Blooming!	Nena	Short film (SineKabataan)	
2026	A Werewolf Boy			

=== Television ===
Year	Title	Role	Notes	Ref.
2023	It's Showtime	Herself	Contestant (Mini Ms. U)	
2024	Lumuhod Ka Sa Lupa	Fatima Aguirre / Fatima Dela Cruz		
2025-presenr	Golden Scenery of Tomorrow			
