= Georg Friedrich Schlater =

Baltic German painter (1804–1870)

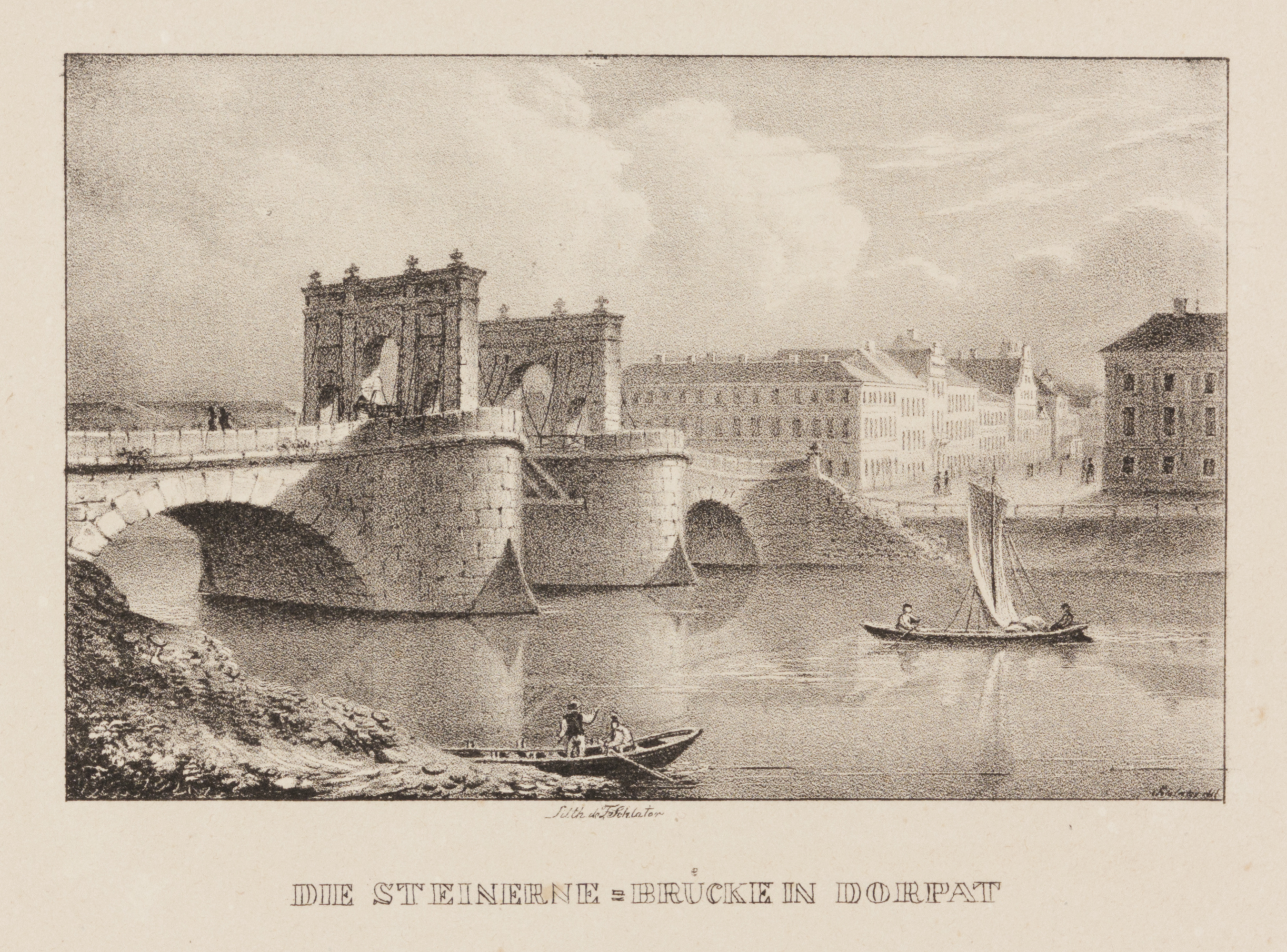
Stone Bridge, Dorpat

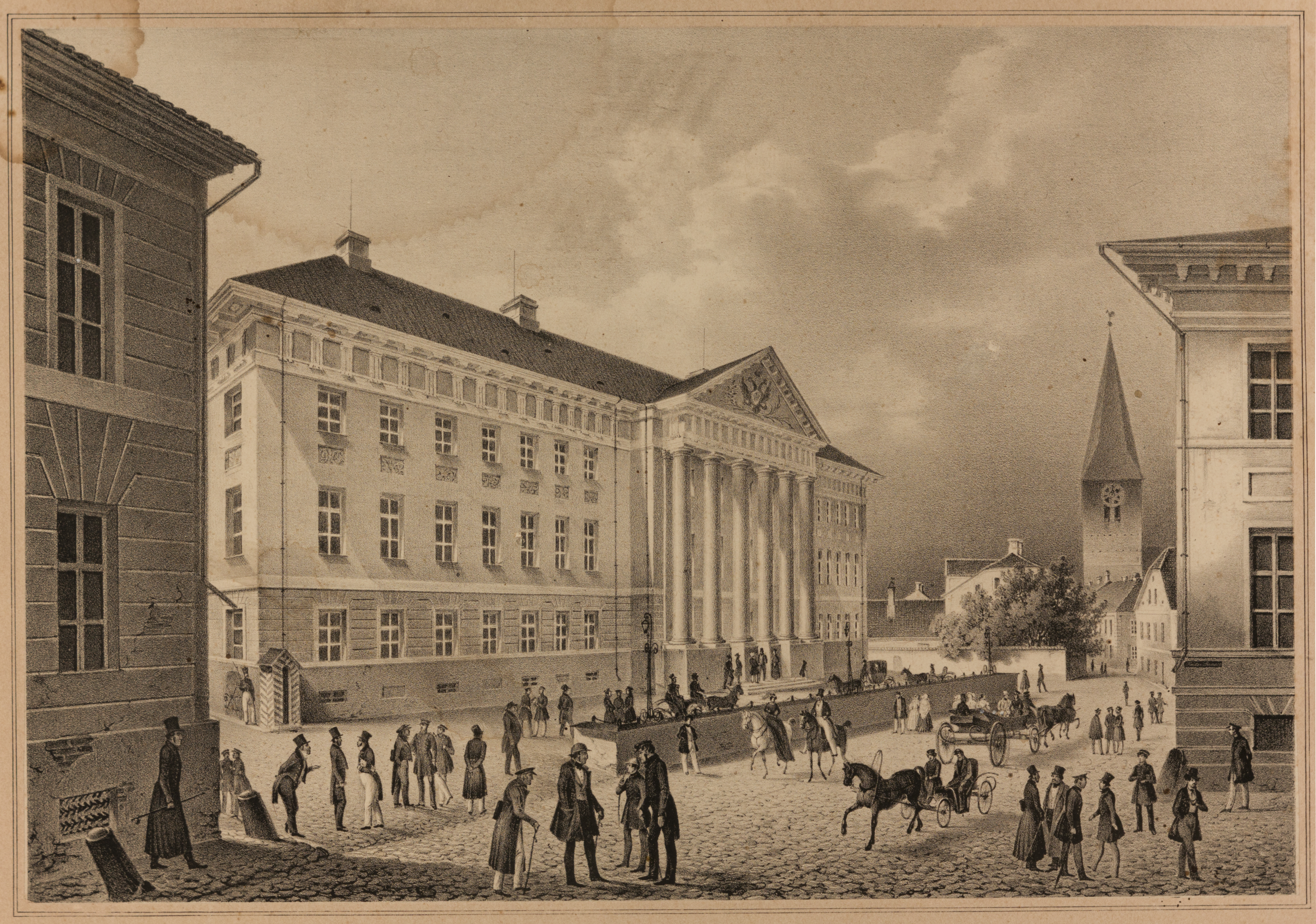
Main Building of the University of Dorpat (1845)

Georg Friedrich Schlater (13 May 1804, in Tilsit – 14 April 1870, in Dorpat) was a Baltic-German painter, lithographer and drawing teacher.

== Life ==
He was born to Georg Friedrich Schlater, a wheelwright, and his wife, Eva Rosina, née Rimler. He learned decorative painting and moved to Riga after leaving home. Around 1834 he moved again, to Dorpat, where he worked painting figures on cardboard that were used as sets for puppet theatres. He occasionally painted the puppets themselves, and children's toys. Eventually, he became a student of Karl August Senff. In 1837, he found employment as a drawing teacher at the Höheren Stadt-Töchterschule, a girls' school.

That same year, he opened a lithographic studio and published scenic pictures of the areas around Dorpat. He also published works by other artists, including August Matthias Hagen, August Georg Wilhelm Pezold and Eduard Hau. In 1838, he became a senior drawing teacher at the Veterinary Institute. While there, he created illustrations for Chirurgische Anatomie der Arterienstämme und Fascien, by Professor Nikolay Pirogov, which earned him a gold medal. During that same period, he began experimenting with multi-colored lithographs.

In 1852, the Imperial Academy of Arts awarded him the title of "Free Artist" for his painting, The Crossing to Annenhof near Dorpat. In his later years, after 1855, he became increasingly interested in photography. In 1857, he sold his studio to Louis Höflinger.

He was married twice; to Friederike Hoffmann (1829), with whom he had six children, including the painter Alexander Georg Schlater, and to Sophia Elisabeth Stratmann (1850). The latter marriage was childless.

== Sources ==
- "Schlater, Friedrich Georg Fridrikovich". Benezit Dictionary of Artists. 2011.
