= Narva Town Hall =

Town hall in Narva, Estonia

- Estonian: Narva raekoda
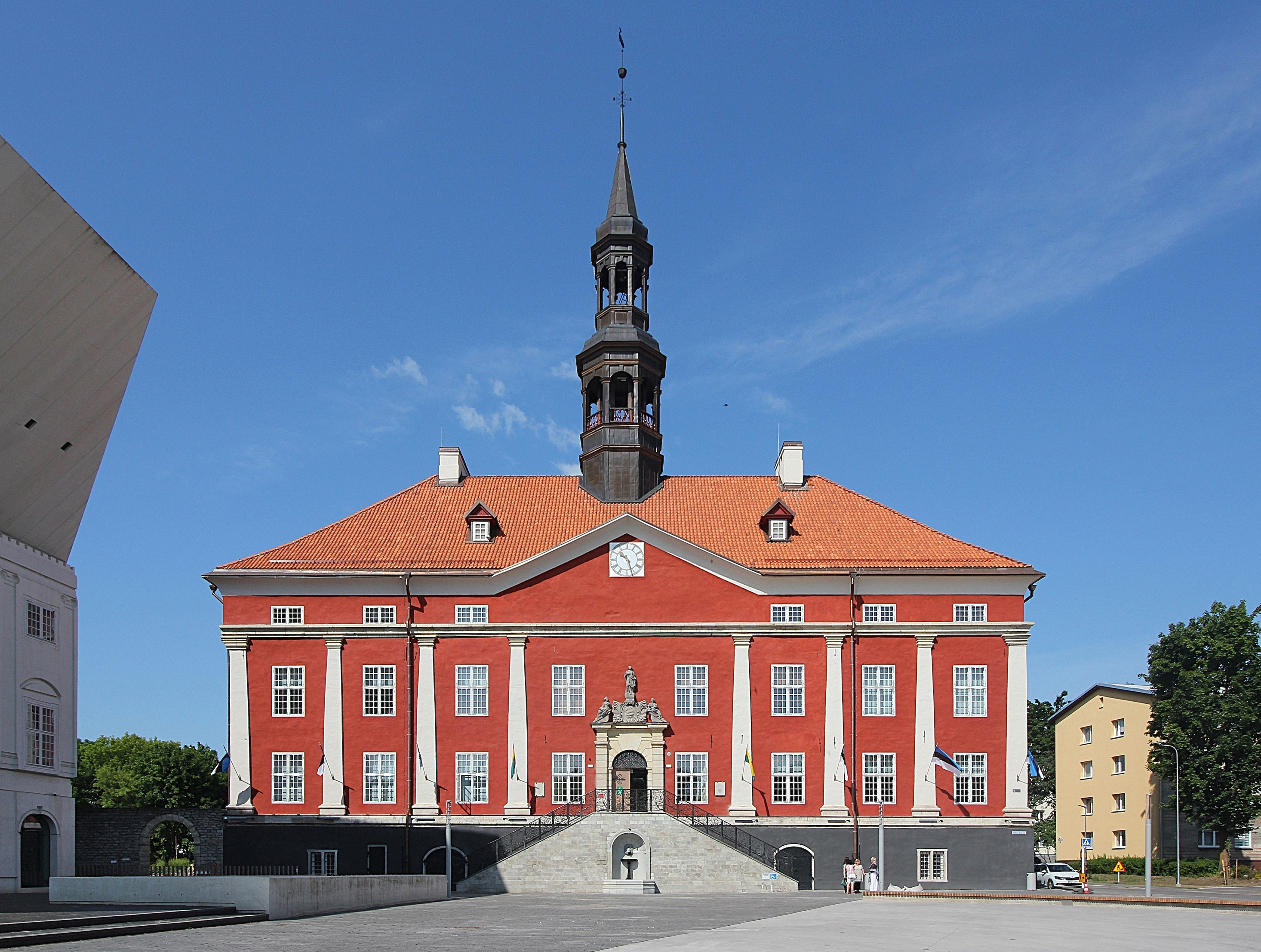
- Narva Town Hall with Narva College (left)
- Interactive map of the Narva Town Hall area

General information
- Location: Narva, Estonia
- Coordinates: 59.3794°N 28.1988°E
- Current tenants: City of Narva
- Construction started: 1668
- Completed: 1671
- Renovated: 1960-63

Design and construction
- Architect: Georg Teuffel

Narva Town Hall (Estonian: Narva raekoda) is a historic municipal building in the city of Narva, Estonia. The building is located on Town Hall Square (Raekoja plats) next to the Narva College of the University of Tartu.

== History ==
The town hall was one of the few elements of the city's baroque-era architecture to be rebuilt following the Second World War. It is now surrounded largely by Soviet-era Stalinist designs and Khrushchyovka. A €7 million renovation project at the Narva Town Hall was completed in 2023. The building has returned to its original function as the seat of Narva's city government and also accommodates a tourist information centre and restaurant.

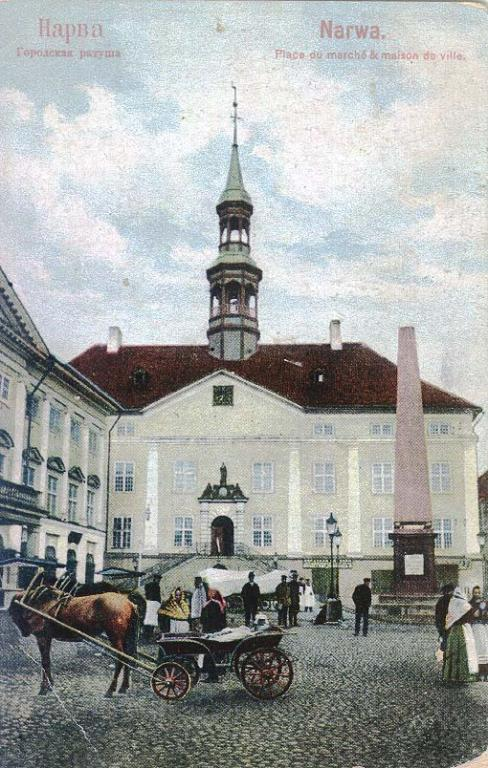
Narva Town Hall before the Second World War

== See also ==
- Tartu Town Hall
