= Sunshine (2024 film) =

2024 Filipino sports drama film by Antoinette Jadaone

- Official release poster, designed by Justin Besana
- Directed by: Antoinette Jadaone
- Written by: Antoinette Jadaone
- Produced by: Geo Lomuntad; Dan Villegas; Bianca Balbuena
- Starring: Maris Racal
- Cinematography: Pao Orendain
- Edited by: Benjamin Tolentino
- Music by: Rico Blanco
- Production companies: Anima Studios; Project 8 Projects; Cloudy Duck Pictures; Happy Infinite Productions
- Distributed by: Project 8 Projects
- Release dates: September 13, 2024 (TIFF); July 23, 2025 (Philippines)
- Running time: 92 minutes
- Country: Philippines
- Language: Filipino
- Box office: ₱50 million

Sunshine is a 2024 Philippine coming-of-age sports drama film written and directed by Antoinette Jadaone. Starring Maris Racal in the title role, along with Elijah Canlas, Xyriel Manabat, Jennica Garcia, Annika Co, and Meryll Soriano, the film follows a young gymnast who finds out she is pregnant on the week of the national tryouts.

A co-production of Anima, Project 8 Projects, Cloudy Duck Pictures, and Happy Infinite Productions, the film was first premiered on September 13, 2024 at the 49th Toronto International Film Festival, and had a European premiere at the 75th Berlinale as part of the Generation 14plus section on February 18, 2025. The film was released to the general public on July 23, 2025.

== Plot ==
Nineteen-year-old Sunshine tries out for the national gymnastics team for a final opportunity to compete in the Olympics. She lives with her older sister Geleen, a former gymnast who became a single mother to an infant daughter, Gracie, and her younger brother, Rod. During practice, Sunshine's coach, Eden, notices her gaining weight before the latter faints. Upon waking up, another coach asks Sunshine when she last menstruated, but she is unable to recall. Realizing that something is wrong, Sunshine leaves and takes a pregnancy test, which yields a positive result. Fearing the end of her athletic career, Sunshine conceals this information and seeks out illegal abortifacients in Quiapo, only to be followed by an unnamed Girl who chastises her using foul language.

Sunshine goes to her boyfriend, Miggy, who dismisses the pregnancy and tells her to abort. Enraged at his apathy, Sunshine smashes his car’s windshield using a steel pipe provided by the Girl. That night, Sunshine goes partying with her friend, Thea, in the hopes that she can terminate her pregnancy through alcohol. But after encountering the Girl, Sunshine reveals her pregnancy to Thea. Sunshine blackmails Miggy into providing money to buy an abortifacient. Afterwards, she undertakes a failed attempt to abort at a motel, resulting in her being hospitalized after she bleeds uncontrollably and collapses in pain, as the Girl desperately comforts her. While recovering, the hospital’s bigoted obstetrician harangues Sunshine until she is fetched by Geleen, who had noticed Sunshine's pregnancy after she vomited while taking care of Gracie. Geleen tells Sunshine to rest, but she refuses, saying that gymnastics is her life.

Rumors of Sunshine's pregnancy spread, prompting Eden to warn Sunshine, who continues to deny the allegations, that she will be removed from the team and to urge her to keep her problems separate from her athletics. Sunshine buys another abortifacient and is afterwards accosted by a 13-year-old pregnant girl, Mary Grace, who also wants an abortion. Sunshine is moved when Mary Grace reveals she was impregnated by her uncle Bobot and gives her money to buy abortifacients. Sunshine then catches up with the Girl and a gay child, Ariana, who is a runaway from her abusive family.

As they chatter, Ariana senses something wrong in their home and rushes back. Sunshine and the Girl follow her, only to discover Mary Grace bleeding and unconscious after trying to abort by herself in a motel. The three rush Mary Grace to the hospital, but the doctors fear legal punishment for assisting in Mary Grace's abortion until a sympathetic doctor, Helena, discreetly agrees to help. Mary Grace eventually recovers but loses her child. As Sunshine comforts Mary Grace, she overhears the Girl searching for Ariana, who has disappeared. Sunshine tries to comfort her, but the latter reproaches her and runs away. Sunshine tells Mary Grace's mother what happened, only to find her cavorting with Bobot. Enraged, Sunshine bludgeons Bobot with a bottle before escaping.

Thea secures an appointment at Helena’s clinic for Sunshine's abortion. At her home, Sunshine is visited by Miggy and his father, Jaime, a pastor. Miggy makes an insincere apology as Jaime offers to help care for their would-be child, but Sunshine refuses, saying that she does not want to be a mother, as Geleen orders the men out. Geleen comforts Sunshine and expresses her support for whatever decision she makes. Afterwards, Sunshine is shown training as the Girl reappears and watches her routine, prompting Sunshine to ask her if she understood her decision. The Girl replies in the affirmative and tearfully embraces Sunshine, implying that her abortion was pushed through and that the Girl was Sunshine's unborn child. The film concludes with Sunshine competing in the Asian Rhythmic Gymnastics Championships, as her family and coaches cheer her on.

== Cast ==
- Maris Racal as Sunshine Francisco
- Annika Co as Girl
- Angie Castrence as abortifacient vendor
- Jennica Garcia as Geleen
- Meryll Soriano as Coach Eden
- Elijah Canlas as Miggy
- Xyriel Manabat as Thea
- Rhed Bustamante as Mary Grace
- Madeleine Nicolas as Dr. Asuncion
- Angeli Bayani as Dr. Helena
- JM Garcia as Ariana
- Bon Lentejas as Rod
- Jaynah Keith Lipa as Gracie
- Ron Capinding as Bobot
- Adriana Agcaoili as Mary Grace's mother
- Piolo Pascual as Pastor Jaime

== Production ==
Antoinette Jadaone began conceiving the film in 2020 after watching Jojo Rabbit, in which she noted the idea of the titular character imagining a fictitious adaptation of Adolf Hitler into life. As part of her research, Jadaone cited the presence of abortifacients being sold next to religious items around Quiapo Church, a Catholic shrine in Manila. She also sought to raise awareness about women’s reproductive rights, teenage pregnancy and abortion, which she described as taboo in the Philippines due to the country's conservative background.

As part of her role as a gymnast, Racal trained with athletes and coaches from the Gymnastics Association of the Philippines to perform several stunts. Production was nearly called off due to high costs, estimated at ₱500,000 (US$10,152.28) until the Film Development Council of the Philippines offered a grant, which was followed by other production companies stepping in. Piolo Pascual was cast as a pastor in the film, but refused to take a talent fee. The film was shot in Manila, particularly in Quiapo and Rizal Avenue. Its musical score, which was inspired by electronic music and The Chemical Brothers single "Elektrobank", was created by Rico Blanco, whose romantic relationship with Racal ended in the same year the film was released.

== Release ==
The film first premiered on September 13, 2024 at the 49th Toronto International Film Festival, which Racal was unable to attend due to scheduling and visa issues. The film had a European premiere at the 2025 Berlinale as part of the Generation 14plus section on 18 February 2025. The film was selected at the 24th New York Asian Film Festival held from July 11 to July 27, 2025 for its New York Premiere.

The film was released in the Philippines on July 23, 2025 with an R-16 rating by the Movie and Television Review and Classification Board and exclusive screening rights by SM Supermalls. This followed efforts by the producers to release the film abroad to generate domestic publicity. The film's red carpet premiere, which was scheduled on July 22, 2025 at the SM Aura mall, was postponed due to heavy rains caused by the southwest monsoon.

The film was shortlisted by the Film Academy of the Philippines for the country's submission to the Best International Feature Film category at the 98th Academy Awards. Magellan by Lav Diaz was ultimately selected.

== Reception ==
=== Critical reception ===
Ralph Revelar Sarza, writing for ABS-CBN, said the film served as a critique of patriarchy, noting that it also centered on women’s reproductive health in a country that "insists on children being born without ever insisting on giving them a world worth being born into". He also noted the role of the unnamed Girl as the film's "riskiest move" for its surrealism, calling her a projection of the titular character's inner turmoil. Charlie Garcia Vitug, writing for SINEGANG.ph, describes the film as "a flicker of hope in the city of broken dreams", explaining that the city is manipulated by conservative forces that continues to oppress the choices of women. While acknowledging that the film's "moral imagery veers toward the didactic," Paul Emmanuel Enicola of The Movie Buff said that Sunshine is "a film that relishes discomfort, one that forces us to confront the silences we’ve learned to live with: around abortion, around reproductive rights, around what we teach our daughters (and sons) about sex, choice, and consequence."

=== Accolades ===
Award	Date	Category	Recipient	Result	Ref.
Asia Pacific Screen Awards	October 2024	Best Youth Film	Sunshine	Nominated	
Berlin International Film Festival	21 February 2025	Crystal Bear for the Best Film	Sunshine	Won	
Austin Asian American Film Festival	June 29, 2025	Narrative Feature Jury Award	Sunshine	Won	
Austin Asian American Film Festival	June 29, 2025	Narrative Feature Audience Award	Sunshine	Won	
Tartuff	2025	Audience Award	Sunshine	Won	
Jogja-NETPAC Asian Film Festival	6 December 2025	Geber Award	Sunshine	Won	
Jogja-NETPAC Asian Film Festival	6 December 2025	Golden Hanoman Award	Sunshine	Jury Special Mention	
6th Pinoy Rebyu Awards	22 June 2026	Best Director	Antoinette Jadaone	Won	
6th Pinoy Rebyu Awards	22 June 2026	Best Lead Performance	Maris Racal	Won	
6th Pinoy Rebyu Awards	22 June 2026	Best Supporting Performance	Jennica Garcia	Won	
9th Eddy's Awards	July 5, 2026	Best Actress	Maris Racal	Won	
9th Eddy's Awards	July 5, 2026	Best Editing	Benjamin Gonzales Tolentino	Won	
9th Eddy's Awards	July 5, 2026	Best Picture	Sunshine	Nominated	
9th Eddy's Awards	July 5, 2026	Best Director	Antoinette Jadaone	Nominated	
9th Eddy's Awards	July 5, 2026	Best Cinematography	Pao Orendain	Nominated	
9th Eddy's Awards	July 5, 2026	Best Visual Effects	Post Bandits Inc.	Nominated	
9th Eddy's Awards	July 5, 2026	Best Musical Score	Rico Blanco	Nominated	
49th Gawad Urian Awards	October 8, 2026	Best Film	Sunshine	Nominated	
49th Gawad Urian Awards	October 8, 2026	Best Actress	Maris Racal	Won	
49th Gawad Urian Awards	October 8, 2026	Best Supporting Actress	Jennica Garcia	Won	
49th Gawad Urian Awards	October 8, 2026	Best Director	Antoinette Jadaone	Nominated	
49th Gawad Urian Awards	October 8, 2026	Best Screenplay	Antoinette Jadaone	Nominated	
49th Gawad Urian Awards	October 8, 2026	Best Cinematography	Pao Orendain	Nominated	
49th Gawad Urian Awards	October 8, 2026	Best Editing	Benjamin Gonzales Tolentino	Nominated	
49th Gawad Urian Awards	October 8, 2026	Best Sound	Vincent Villa	Nominated	
28th Gawad PASADO Awards	October 22, 2026	PinakaPASADONG Pelikula ng Taon	Sunshine	Won	
28th Gawad PASADO Awards	October 22, 2026	PinakaPASADONG Aktres	Maris Racal	Won	
28th Gawad PASADO Awards	October 22, 2026	PinakaPASADONG Katuwang na Aktres	Jennica Garcia	Won	
28th Gawad PASADO Awards	October 22, 2026	PinakaPASADONG Katuwang na Actor	Elijah Canlas	Nominated	
28th Gawad PASADO Awards	October 22, 2026	PinakaPASADONG Batang Aktor	Annika Co	Nominated	
28th Gawad PASADO Awards	October 22, 2026	PinakaPASADONG Direktor	Antoinette Jadaone	Nominated	
28th Gawad PASADO Awards	October 22, 2026	PinakaPASADONG Istorya	Antoinette Jadaone	Won	
28th Gawad PASADO Awards	October 22, 2026	PinakaPASADONG Dulang Pampelikula	Antoinette Jadaone	Nominated	
28th Gawad PASADO Awards	October 22, 2026	PinakaPASADONG Sinematograpiya	Pao Orendain	Nominated	
28th Gawad PASADO Awards	October 22, 2026	PinakaPASADONG Editing	Benjamin Gonzales Tolentino	Nominated	
28th Gawad PASADO Awards	October 22, 2026	PinakaPASADONG Musika	Rico Blanco	Nominated	
28th Gawad PASADO Awards	October 22, 2026	PinakaPASADONG Tunog	Vincent Villa	Nominated	
42nd PMPC Star Awards for Movies	October 25, 2026	Indie Movie of the Year	Sunshine	Nominated	
42nd PMPC Star Awards for Movies	October 25, 2026	Movie Actress of the Year	Maris Racal	Won	
42nd PMPC Star Awards for Movies	October 25, 2026	Movie Supporting Actress of the Year	Jennica Garcia	Nominated	
42nd PMPC Star Awards for Movies	October 25, 2026	Movie Child Performer of the Year	Annika Co	Nominated	
42nd PMPC Star Awards for Movies	October 25, 2026	Indie Movie Ensemble Acting of the Year	Sunshine	Nominated	
42nd PMPC Star Awards for Movies	October 25, 2026	Indie Movie Director of the Year	Antoinette Jadaone	Nominated	
42nd PMPC Star Awards for Movies	October 25, 2026	Indie Movie Screenwriter of the Year	Antoinette Jadaone	Nominated	
42nd PMPC Star Awards for Movies	October 25, 2026	Indie Movie Cinematographer of the Year	Pao Orendain	Nominated	
42nd PMPC Star Awards for Movies	October 25, 2026	Indie Movie Editor of the Year	Benjamin Gonzales Tolentino	Nominated	
42nd PMPC Star Awards for Movies	October 25, 2026	Indie Movie Production Designer of the Year	Eero Yves Francisco	Nominated	
42nd PMPC Star Awards for Movies	October 25, 2026	Indie Musical Scorer of the Year	Rico Blanco	Nominated	
42nd PMPC Star Awards for Movies	October 25, 2026	Indie Movie Sound Engineer of the Year	Vincent Villa	Nominated	
74th FAMAS Award	October 27, 2026	Best Picture	Sunshine	Pending	
74th FAMAS Award	October 27, 2026	Best Actress	Maris Racal	Pending	
74th FAMAS Award	October 27, 2026	Best Supporting Actress	Jennica Garcia	Pending	
74th FAMAS Award	October 27, 2026	Best Child Performer	Annika Co	Pending	
74th FAMAS Award	October 27, 2026	Best Director	Antoinette Jadaone	Pending	
74th FAMAS Award	October 27, 2026	Best Screenplay	Antoinette Jadaone	Pending	
74th FAMAS Award	October 27, 2026	Best Cinematography	Pao Orendain	Pending	
74th FAMAS Award	October 27, 2026	Best Editing	Benjamin Gonzales Tolentino	Pending	
74th FAMAS Award	October 27, 2026	Best Sound	Vincent Villa	Pending	

== Adaptation ==
After Sunshine won the Crystal Bear award for best film in the Berlin International Film Festival, Indiecan Entertainment acquired the rights to distribute the film in North America and produce an English adaptation of the movie which will be directed by Avi Federgreen and to be produced by Federgreen Entertainment and Siné Media Inc.
