= Kissing Students =

Sculpture by Mati Karmin in Tartu, Estonia

Coordinates: 58°22′49″N 26°43′23″E

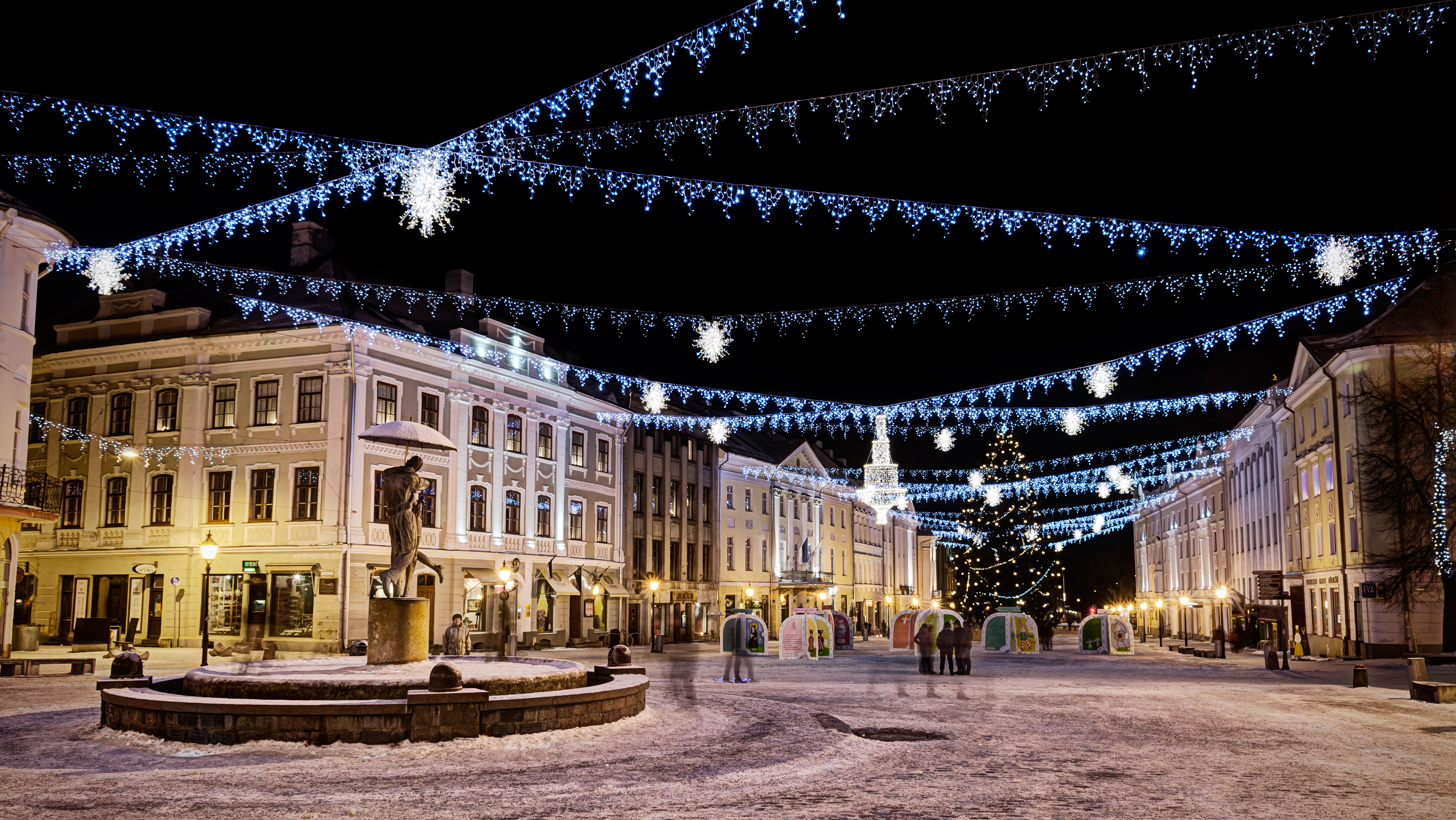
Tartu's town hall square, December 2012

Kissing Students (Estonian: Suudlevad tudengid) is a sculpture and fountain located in Raekoja plats, Tartu, Estonia. The structure stands in front of Tartu Town Hall. The sculpture is one of the most recognizable symbols of Tartu, particularly because the city is regarded as the country's "intellectual capital" and "student capital". This reputation stems from Tartu being home to the nation's oldest and most renowned university, the University of Tartu.

The fountain was built in 1948 and was especially popular with newlyweds, who believed that standing there would bring good luck for the future.

The sculpture was created in 1998 by Mati Karmin.
