= Johann Heinrich Bartholomäus Walther =

Baltic German architect

- Born: 1737; Rostock
- Died: 1802 (aged 64–65); Tartu

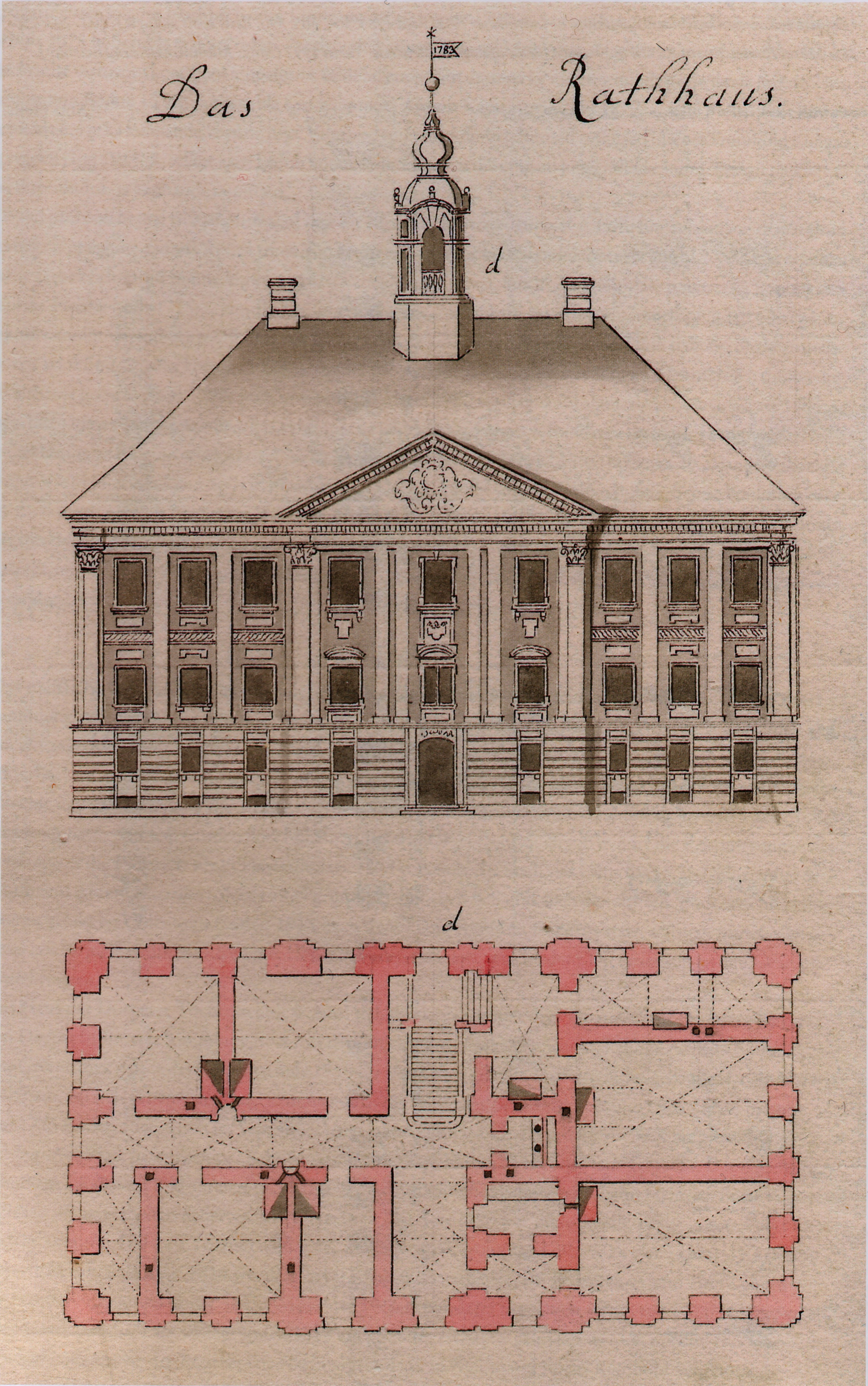
Tartu Town Hall from the collection of Johann Christoph Brotze.

Johann Heinrich Bartholomäus Walther (1737–1802) was a Baltic German architect, working in Tartu where he produced a number of buildings including Tartu Town Hall.

== Life ==
Walther was born in Rostock in 1737. He moved to Tartu in the Russian Empire where he was a master builder. Following the Great Fire of Tartu in 1775 he designed Tartu Town Hall and the Von Bock House in the centre of the city.

Walther was buried in Tartu on 2 April 1802.
