= Johann Wilhelm Krause (architect) =

Baltic German architect

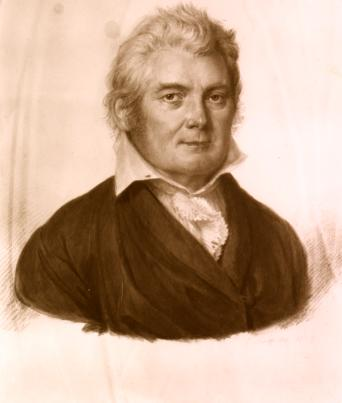
Johann Wilhelm Krause

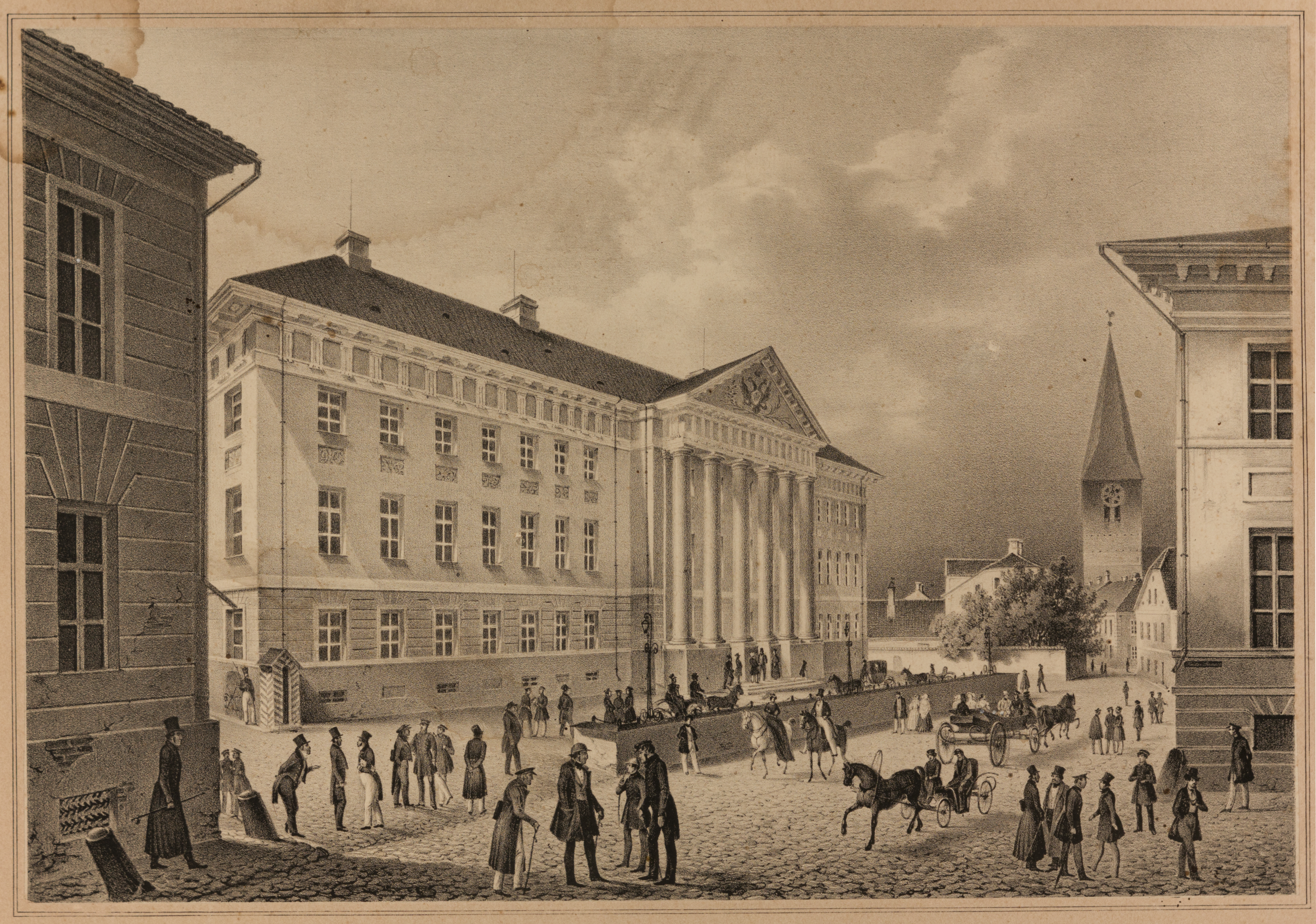
Main building of Tartu University in 1845

Johann Wilhelm Krause (19 June 1757 – 22 August 1828) was a Baltic German architect. His most notable work was the designing of main building of Tartu University.

He was born in Dittmannsdorf, Germany.

Before 1787 he was in the military service of England. In 1787 he came to Livonia and started to work as a home teacher. In 1803 he was chosen to the professor at the University of Tartu. During the Tartu period he designed several buildings in Tartu.

He died in Tartu.

== Works ==
- 1803-1809 main building of Tartu University
- Old Anatomical Theatre (1803–1805 its central part, and 1825–1827 its wings)
- 1804-1807 restructuring of the ruins of Tartu Cathedral into the Tartu University Library.
