= Louis Höflinger =

Baltic-German artist and photographer

Georg Ludwig Friedrich Höflinger (bapt. 13 February 1825 – 16 September 1898) was a Baltic-German artist and photographer, who worked in Estonia.

Höflinger was born in Schwalheim, Bad Nauheim, Grand Duchy of Hesse, German Confederation. In 1857, he acquired Georg Friedrich Schlater's lithography studio in Tartu. He worked together with the draughtsman Eduard Ivanson (Iwansohn).

In 1858, he married Elise Catharine Rogenhagen in a Lutheran ceremony in Pärnu. He died in Latvia in 1898.

== Works ==
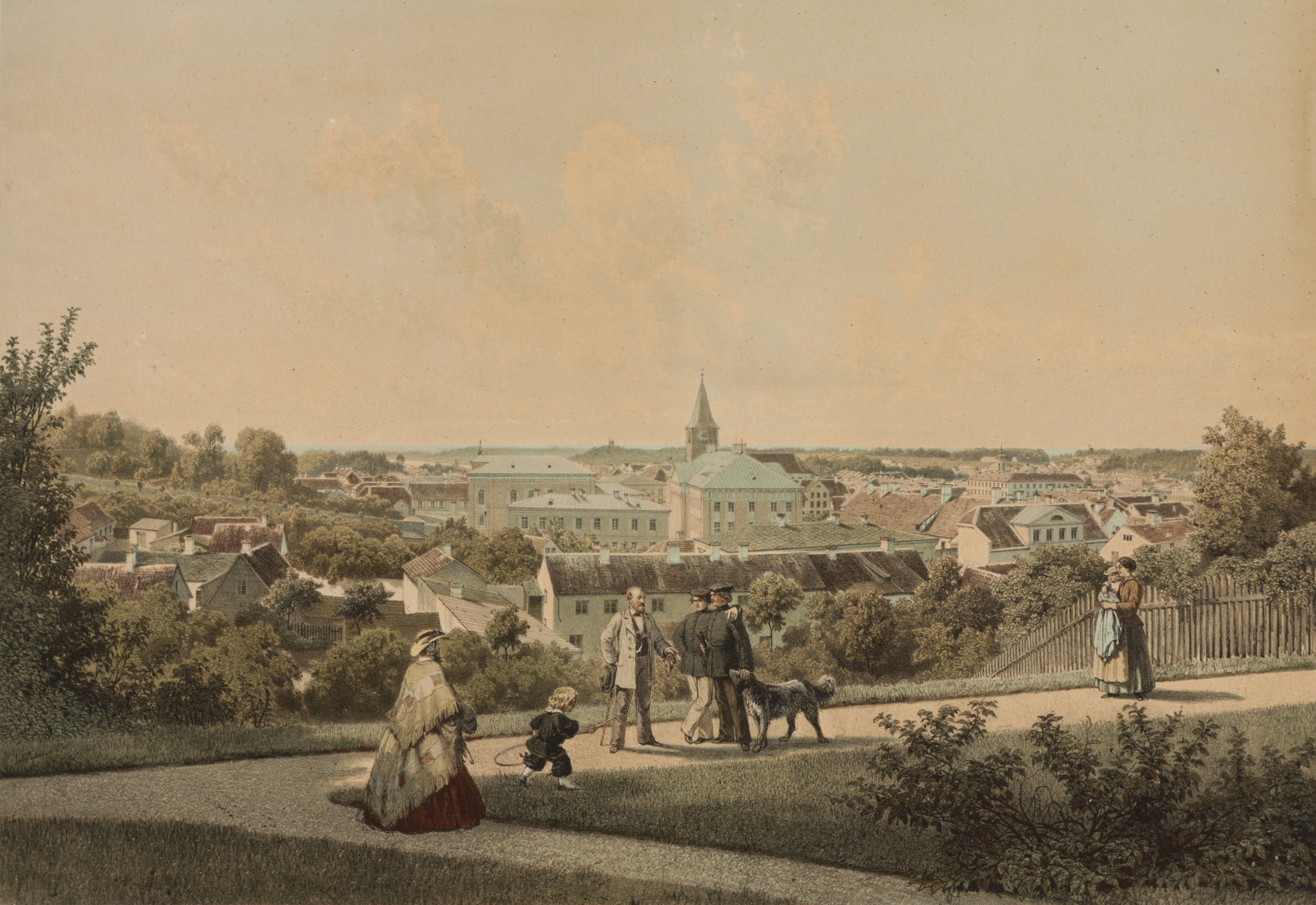
"Vaade Tartule Toomelt" (1860)

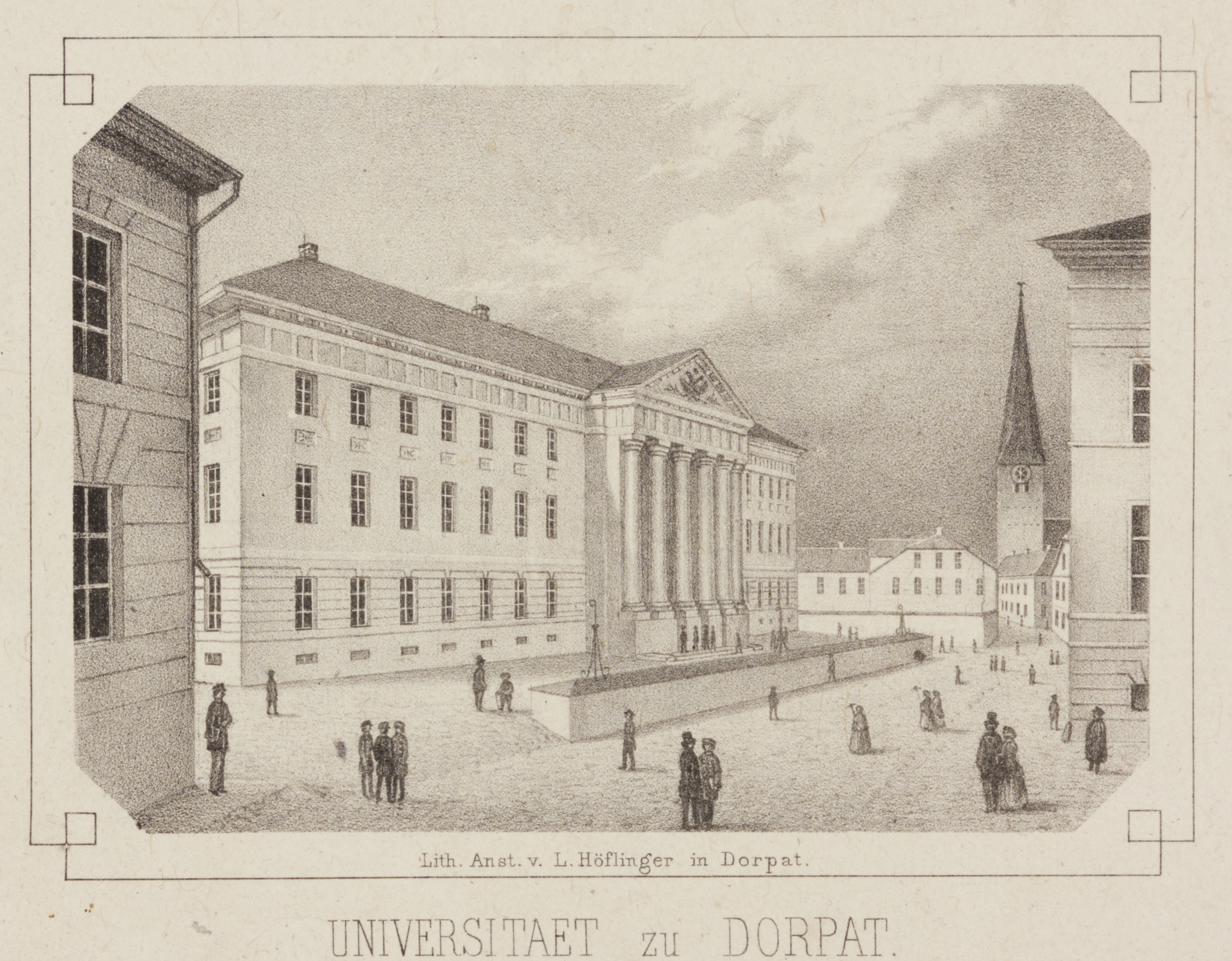
"Tartu Ülikool" (1860)

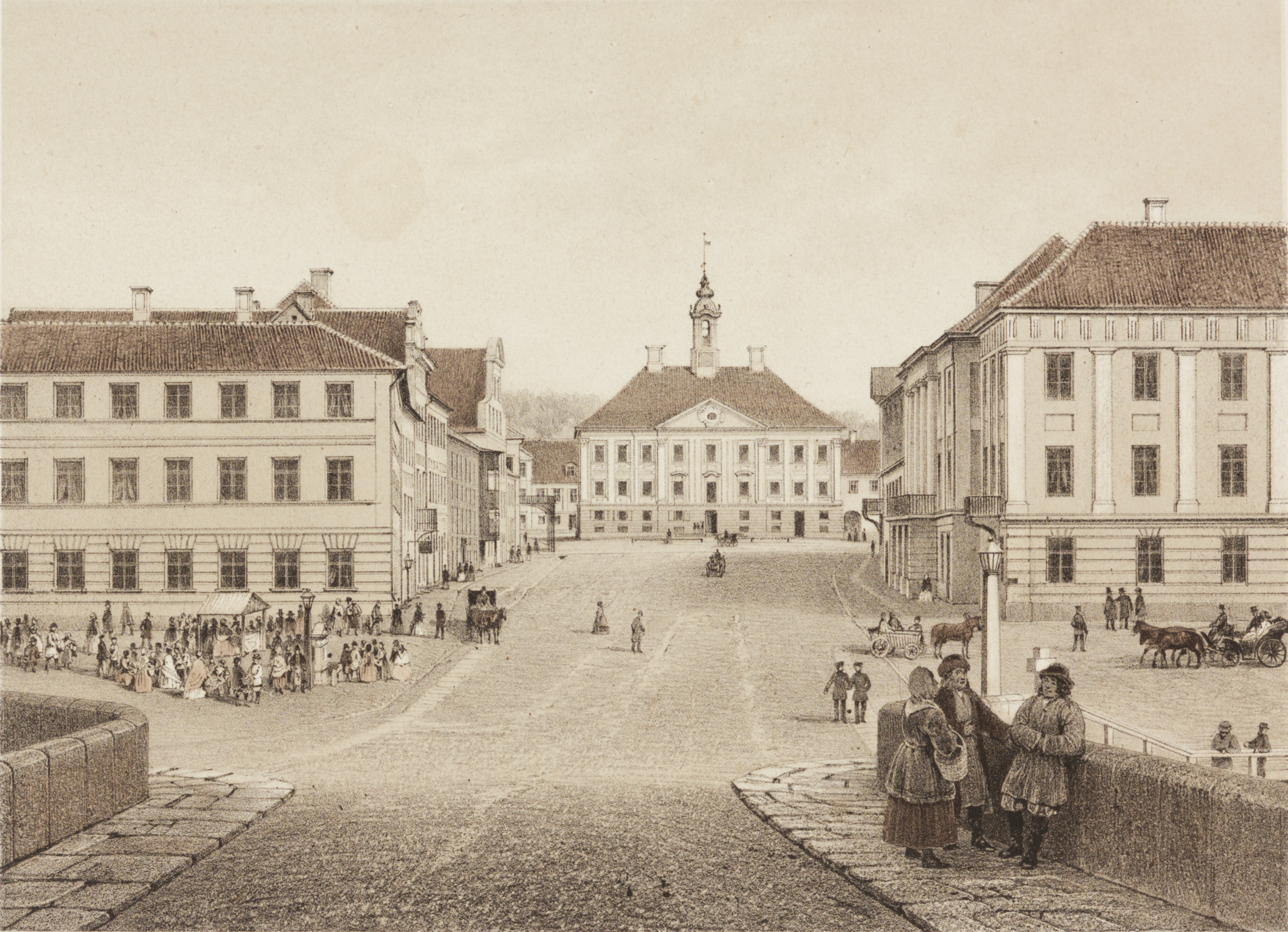
"Turu tänav koos raekojaga" (1860)

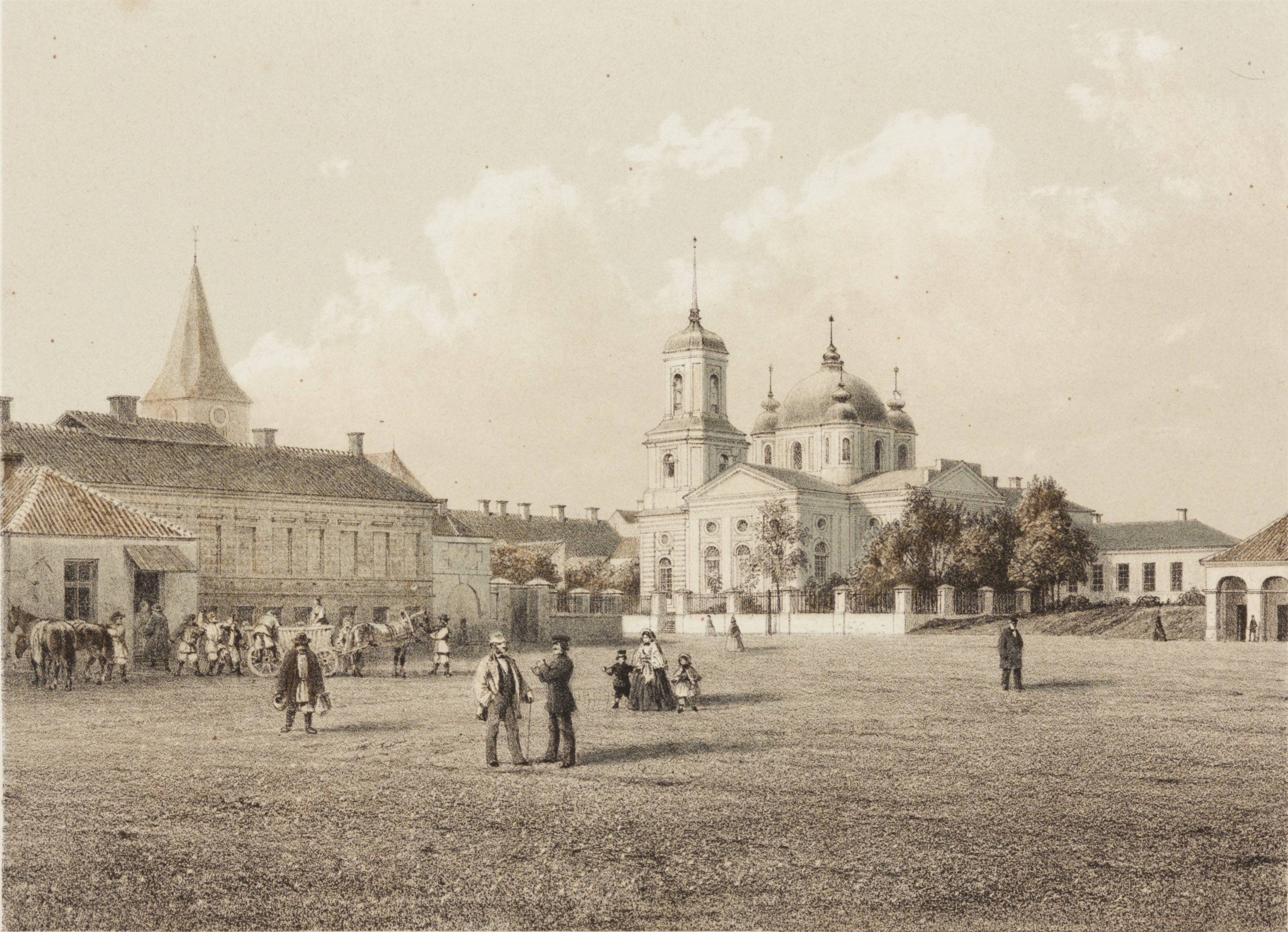
"Vene kirik" (1860)

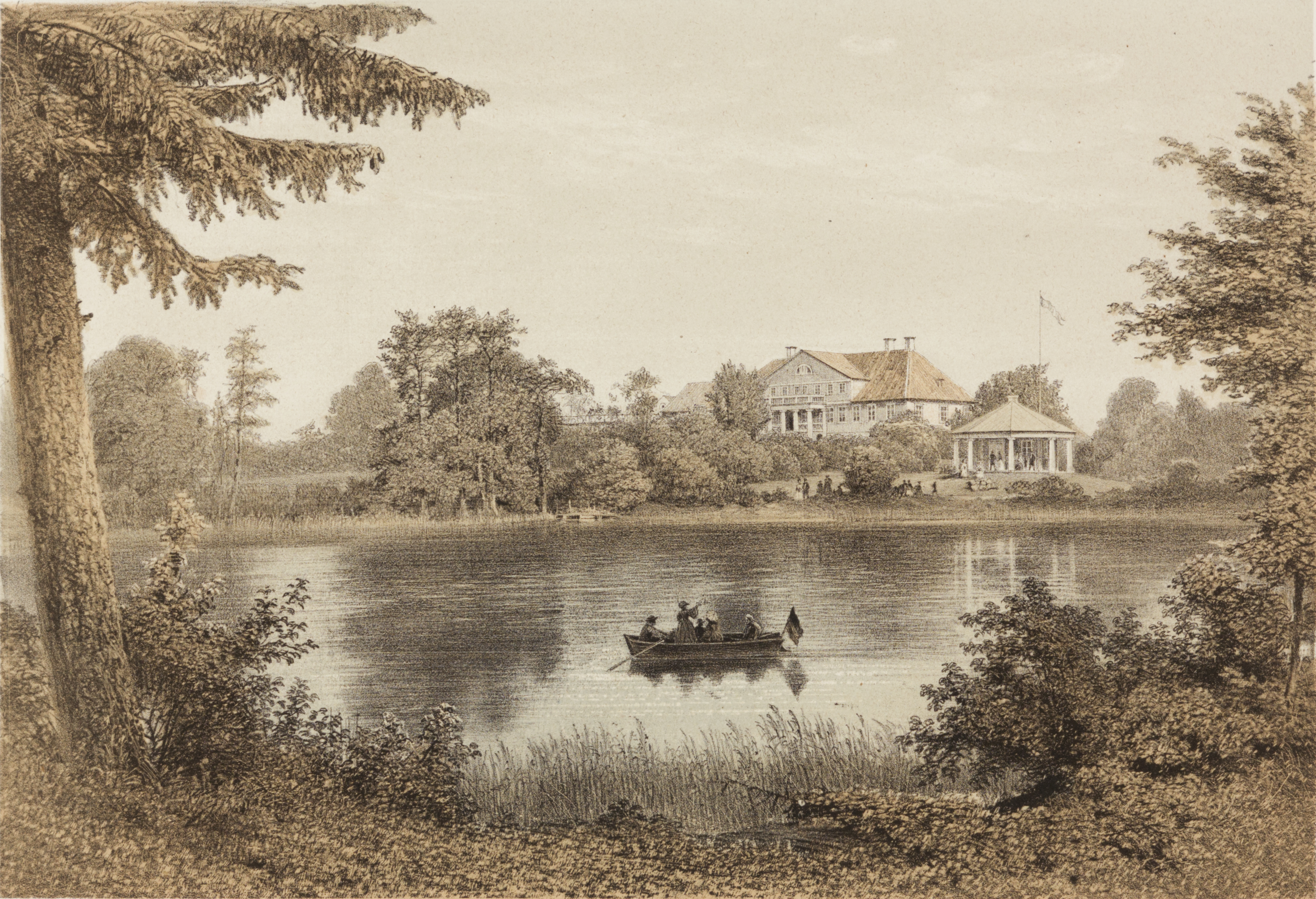
"Pühajärve vaade pargimajast" (1860)
