= Great fire of Tartu =

1775 fire in Tartu, Estonia

Coordinates: 58°22′55″N 26°43′20″E

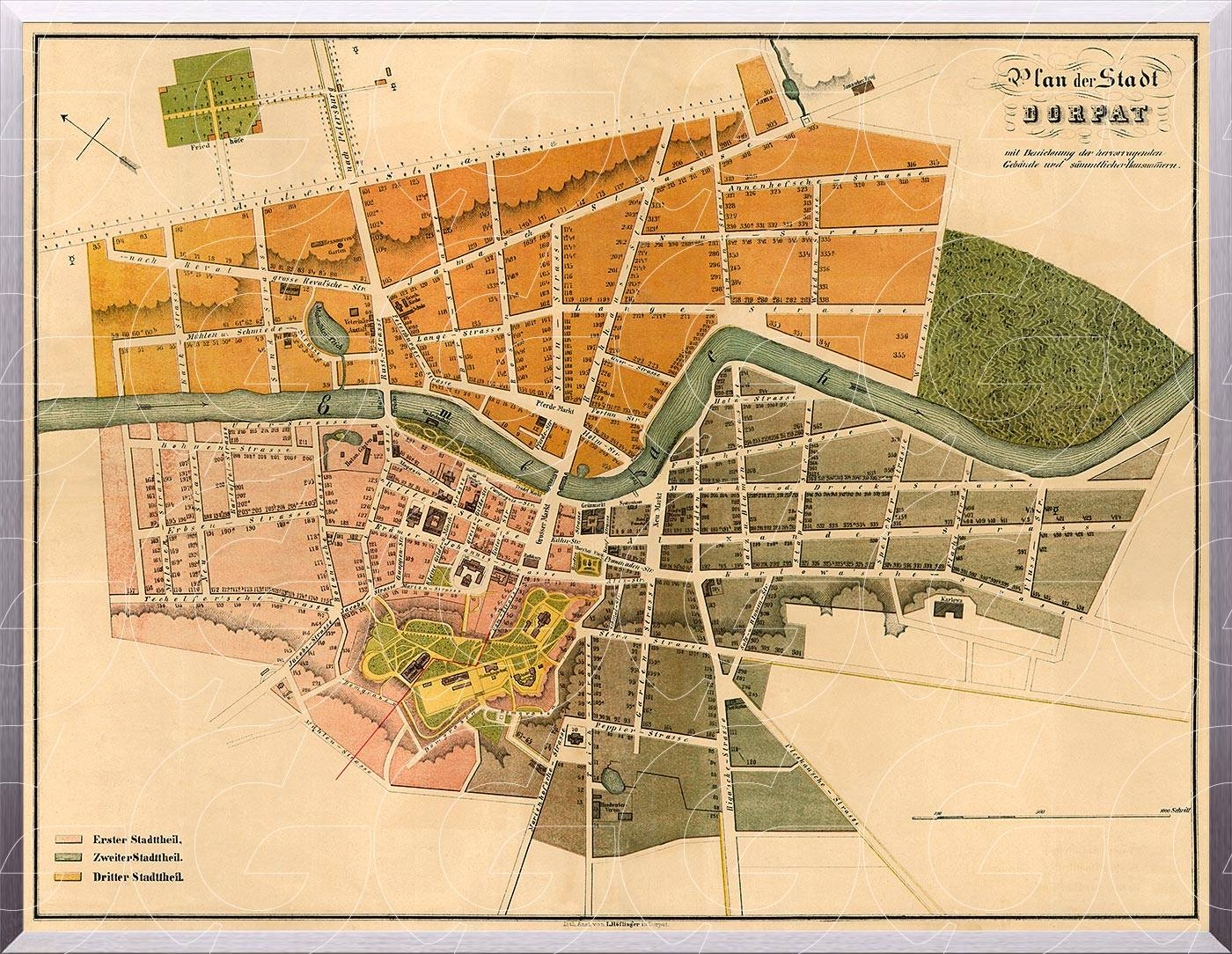
Tartu in 1870 after the city had been rebuilt

The Great Fire of Tartu took place on 6 July [O.S. 25 June] 1775, destroying most of the city of Tartu, located in present-day Estonia. The fire destroyed the centre of the city.

== History ==
Tartu had lost most of its major stone buildings when they were blown up in September 1708 on the orders of Peter the Great during the Great Northern War. The Russian tsar ordered that the buildings in Tartu (then called Dorpat) should be mined to prevent the Swedes from using the town as a military base. This was just one of the sieges which Tartu was subjected to during its history, but this time the city was left burning and in ruins. When the war finished, the population returned to Tartu, and the desperate need for houses created an abundance of new wooden buildings. The buildings had to be built of wood as the Tsar had laid orders that no stone buildings were to be built anywhere except in the new Russian capital St. Petersburg.

The first large fire occurred in 1763. The following year Catherine the Great visited, and some rebuilding took place. The Great Fire occurred in 1775. It started in the backyard of Knights Street (Rüütli tänav) near St. John's Church. A strong wind allowed the fire to spread from building to building, and the wooden bridges allowed the fire to cross the river to do further damage. Nearly 200 wooden buildings were destroyed and over 40 stone buildings. The city was further damaged when eighteen buildings were purposefully destroyed to create fire breaks.

At the end of the fire only about 160 buildings remained; most of these were to the north of the city. There were only 40 left standing in the former centre of the city. Uppsala House, located near St. John’s Church, is said to be one of the few surviving buildings that predate the fire (meaning, it was built before the fire incident, survived the disaster and is still standing). Some of its timbers have been dated to 1750.

== After the fire ==
Following the fire the city was rebuilt. After the fire the rules that had required that there be no new stone buildings were reversed and it was now required to construct not only new buildings but also fences and outbuildings without using wood. The cornerstone of Tartu Town Hall was laid in 1782 and completed under the command of Johann Heinrich Bartholomäus Walther.

Catherine the Great found 25,000 rubles to ease the situation in Tartu after the fire, and the money was used to build a stone bridge across the river. The remains of this bridge can still be seen beneath the river Emajõgi, but the main part of the bridge was destroyed during the Second World War.
