= Mati Karmin =

Estonian sculptor

Mati Karmin (born 26 February 1959 in Tartu) is one of Estonia's most renowned contemporary sculptors. His career as an artist is characterised by an intense and remarkably versatile activity. Like many of his contemporaries, the representatives of the so-called 1980s generation in Estonian art, Karmin received professional training in the Estonian Academy of Art, which was thorough, yet traditional, not to say conservative according to the international criteria. During his studies, Estonian sculpture was predominantly figurative and employed traditional materials like stone and bronze.

Karmin, on the other hand, has been creating almost all his independent work in a rapidly changing art scene, which is characterised by the denial of traditions, the disputation of values, and the blurring of borders between the art forms as well as art and its surrounding space. The notion of sculpture itself has undergone an especially radical transformation. Karmin has reacted to the changing situation perhaps in more dynamic, yet also controversial manner than the majority of Estonian artists. Vibrant creativity, with a very professional plastic thinking and perfect material perception at its heart, has allowed him to act as a traditionalist as well an innovator, achieving outstanding results in both areas.

Besides traditional materials, primarily bronze, Karmin has taken inspiration from unconventional solutions and employed innovative materials right from the beginning of his career. Early on, he caught attention with one of his first exhibited sculptures, “Military Fox” (1981), cleverly formed of corroded scrap metal details. Scrap metal has frequently emerged as an important material and source of inspiration, also in the later work of Karmin. Up to the mid-1990s, he used scrap metal basically within the borders of the traditional notion of sculpture. By that we think of figures and decorative forms that communicate with space, like the conventional free sculpture, and that are meant to be placed on a platform.

One of the most grandiose manifestations of the exploring line of Karmin's work is the underwater mine furniture project that began five years ago. On the northern coast of Estonia - especially the islands - there were numerous heaps of corroded mine shells, which are basically spheres with holes, spires and shackles. Karmin got inspired by these mines and started to collect them. The ambiguity of large-scale corroded mine shells intrigued the artist. The shape of the mine is perfect and uniform, while still clearly bearing the stamp of its initial destructive function. Being marked by its belonging to the past, it is closely connected to the complicated recent history that Karmin has always been fascinated by.

Karmin's entire work has relied on various contradictions. He entered the Estonian sculpture scene as an innovator, and the continuity of that trait in his creative biography persists; however the notion of classical sculpture and the classical material for sculpture – bronze – is still very important to him, and he has time and again returned to it, whether in free sculpture or monumental sculpture.

My furniture, despite its unprecedented novelty, brings together the two directions in the artist's work. It can be clearly sensed how the artist has enjoyed playing with materials and forms, having developed both its meanings and looks, creating a versatile series, based on contradictions and contrasts.

Karmin uses mines as modules. The entire furniture series is composed of only two existing basic forms of mines – the hemisphere and the cylinder. He has created utility articles of diverse forms, resulting in armchairs, writing desks, beds, toilets, cupboards, bathtubs, swings, fireplaces, and more. He has added to the scrap metal hand-treated copper details, metal mesh, leather upholstery and granite and glass surfaces, thus consciously increasing the semantic contradiction of objects.

At the end of the mine project, the artist created a mobile sculpture out of a Soviet military truck. His vehicle has instead of a rocket a gigantic phallus of mine shells towering above, with four clocks at its top, showing time in four geographic places of the world – Moscow, London, Paris and New York.

In 1988, Karmin participated in the Soviart exhibition, which included both American and Soviet artists.

My Father (1994) is a construction of "the artist's rigorous father," functioning like an archive of his father's life. This included "an archive of photos, sample bottles of soil and grain, [and] notebooks" that represent the relationship between Karmin's father and himself.

Karmin designed a marble plaque with a bronze relief portrait of Nobel Prize laureate Wilhelm Ostwald to commemorate his time as a student at the University of Tarfu.

== Works ==
- 1984 monument of the cloth factory, Kärdla
- 1989 monument of the first national song festival, Tartu
- 1989 monument to Charles Leroux, Tallinn
- 1991 bust of Oscar Brackmann, Pärnu
- 1995 MS Estonia memorial, Tahkuna
- 1995 bust of Alfred Neuland, Valga
- 1996 panorama of the Tallinn crematory
- 1996 monument to Hugo Treffner, Tartus
- 1997 bust of Andres Saal, Tori
- 1997 MS Estonia memorial, Pärnu
- 1998 fountain "Kissing Students", Tartu
- 1998 monument to Carl Robert Jakobson, Viljandi
- 1998 Estonian War of Independence. War of Independence memorial at Ropka cemetery, Tartu
- 2001 monument to Jaan Tõnisson, Tartu
- 2003 equestrian statue of Saint George, Tori
- 2006 monument to Michael Park, Tallinn
- 2007 monument to Juri Lotman, Tartu
- 2008 Bronze pig, Tartu
- 2010 monument to Marie Under, Tallinn
- 2022 monument to Jaak Joala, Viljandi

== Awards ==
- 2003: Anton Starkopf Fellowship
