= Barclay Square =

Square in Tartu, Estonia

Coordinates: 58°22′44.27″N 26°43′24.3″E

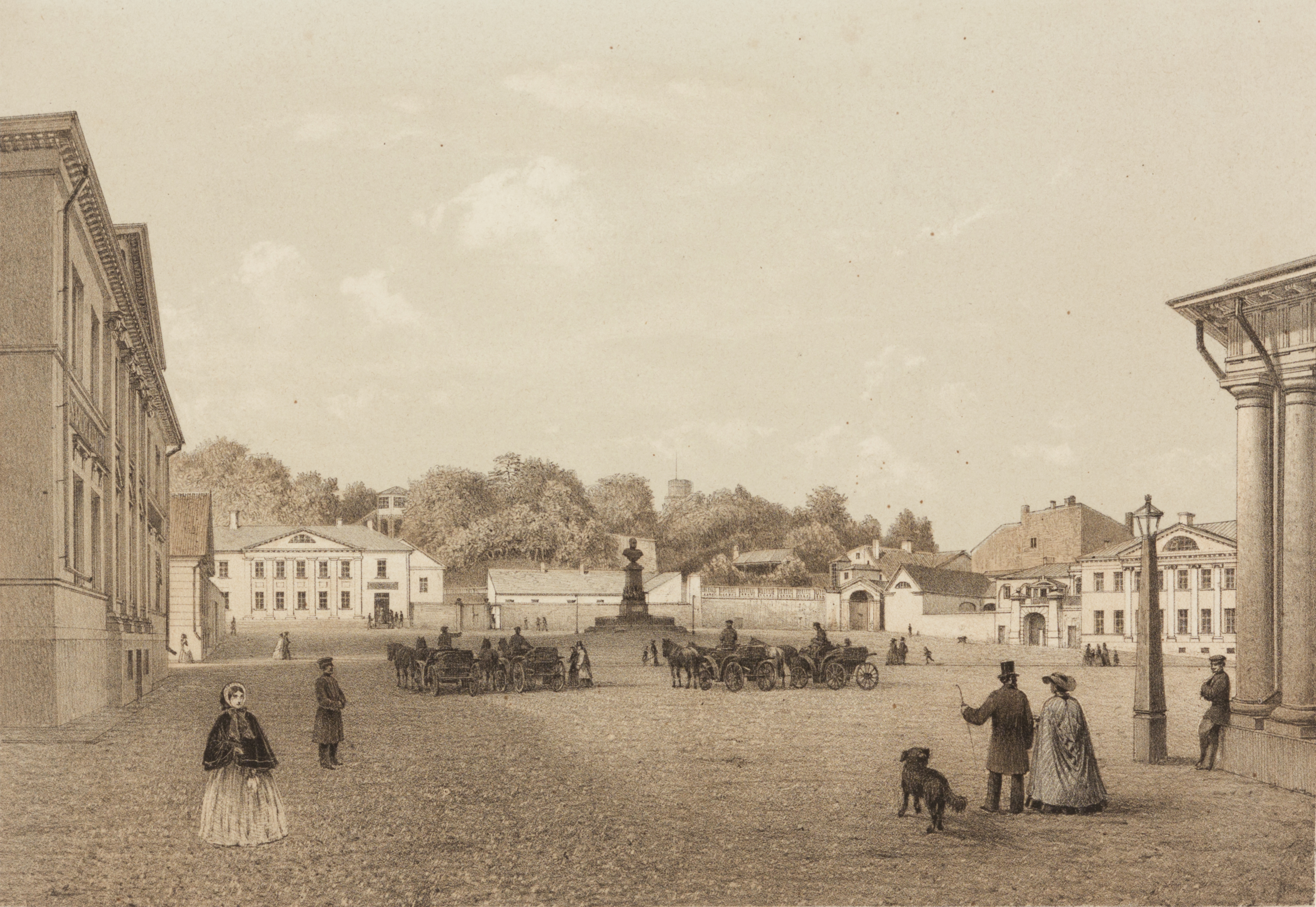
Barclay Square in 1860

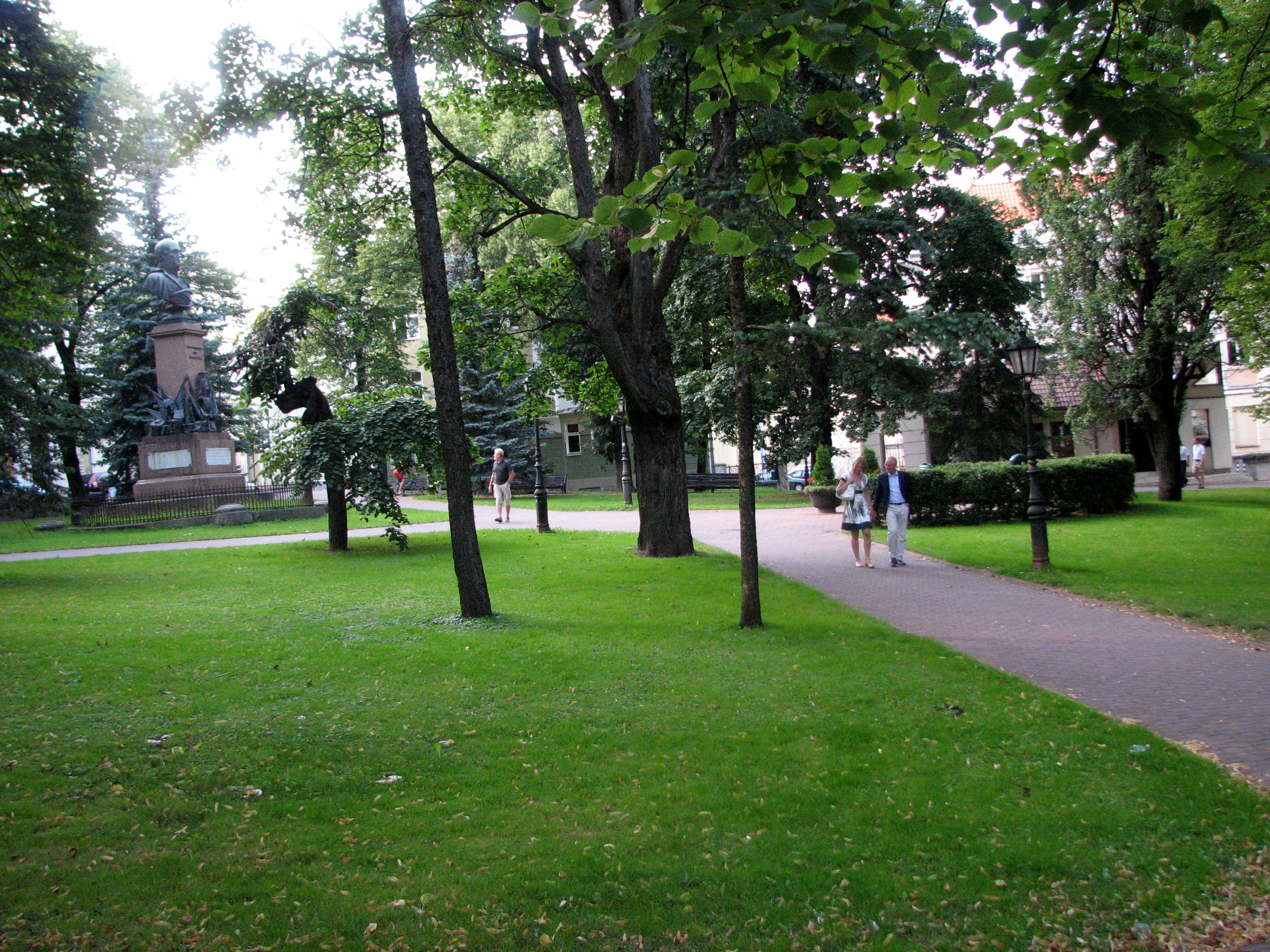
Barclay Square in 2007

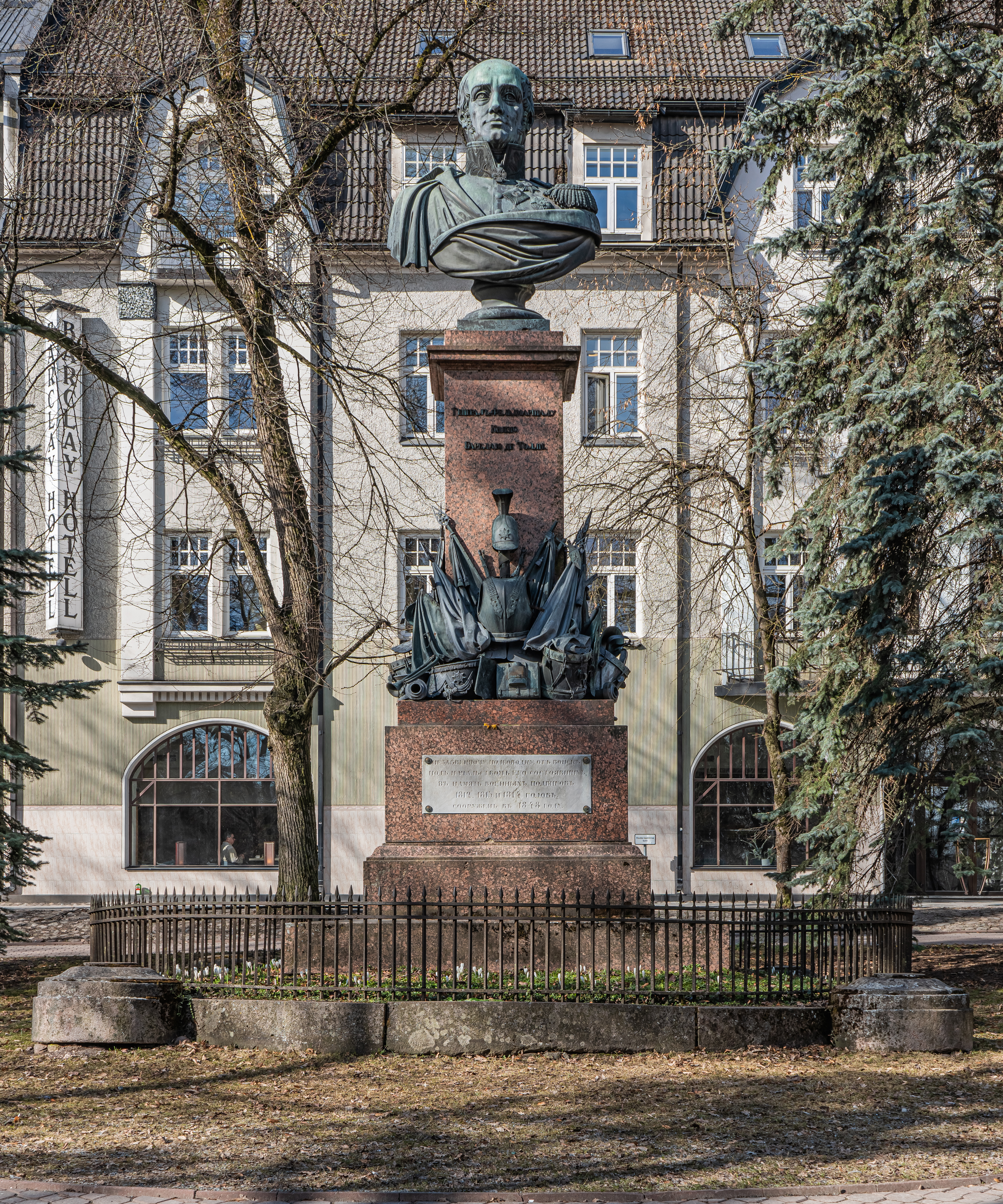
Monument of Barclay de Tolly

Barclay Square (Estonian: Barclay plats) is a public square and park in the city of Tartu, Estonia, adjacent to the Ülikooli street. It is named after Russian Imperial officer Michael Andreas Barclay de Tolly and there is a large monument in the park honoring him.
