= Raekoja plats, Tartu =

Square in Tartu, Estonia

Coordinates: 58°22′49″N 26°43′23″E

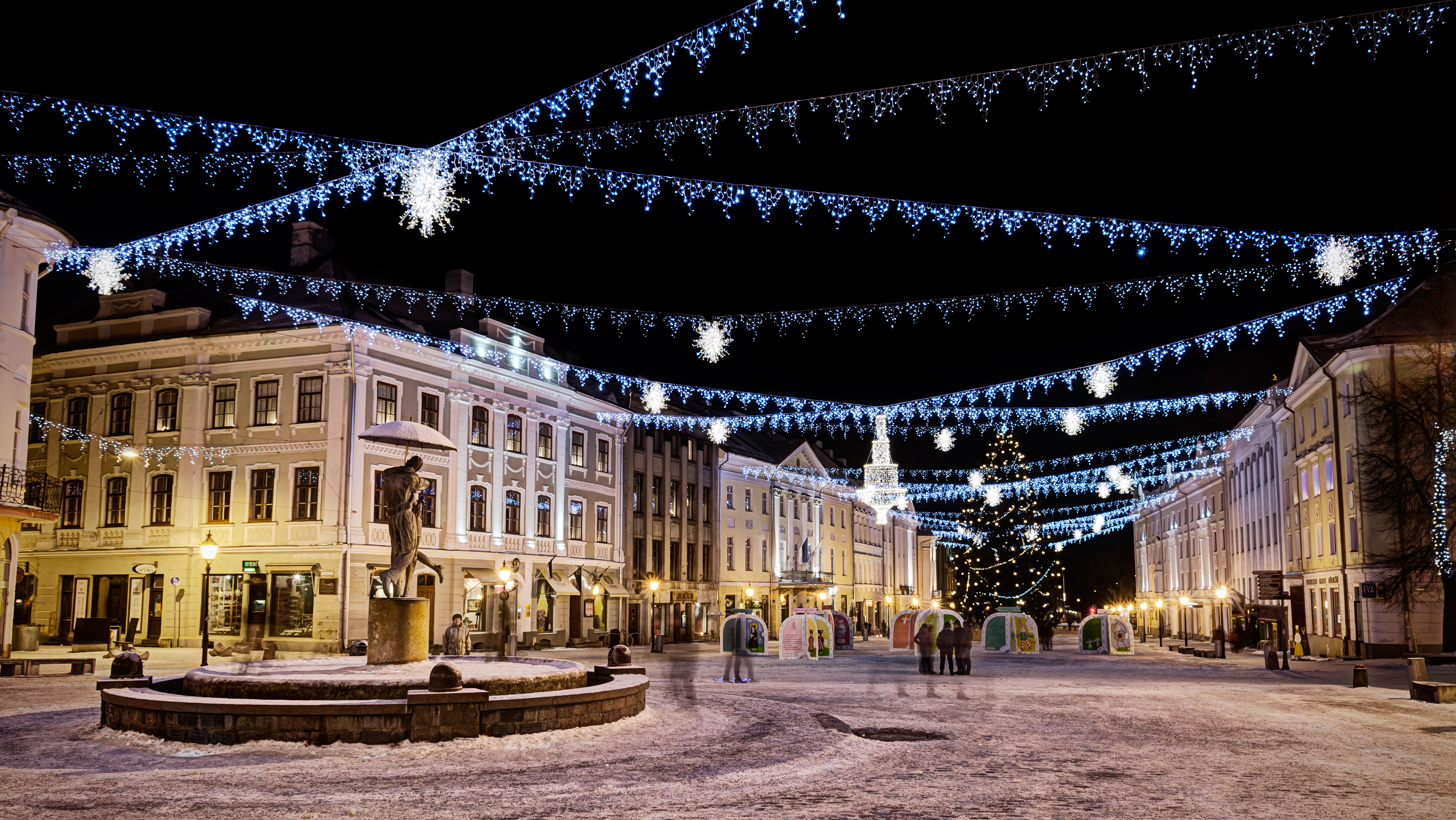
Raekoja plats during December 2012

Raekoja plats (English: Town Hall Square) is town square beside Tartu Town Hall (Estonian: Raekoda) in the center of the Tartu Old Town in Tartu, Estonia.

It is a venue for numerous festivals like Tartu Hanseatic Days (Estonian: Tartu Hansapäevad), and several bars and restaurants locate in the near vicinity.

The fountain and sculpture "Kissing Students" is located in front of Town Hall Square.
