= Main building of Tartu University =

Building of Tartu University

Coordinates: 58°22′52″N 26°43′12″E

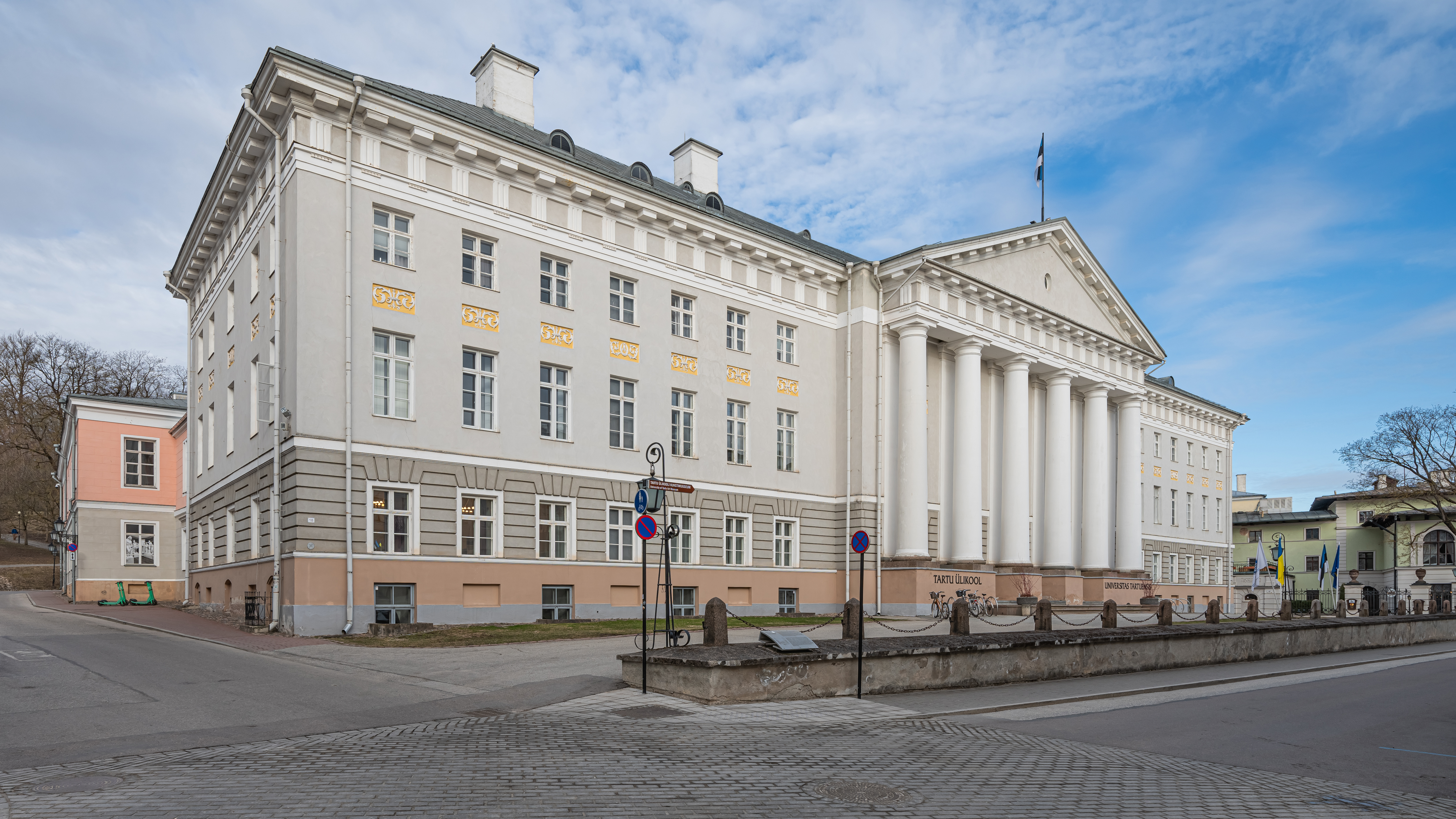
Main building of Tartu University

Main building of Tartu University (Estonian: Tartu Ülikooli peahoone) is the main building of the University of Tartu. This building is one of the most notable examples of classical style in Estonia.

Built between 1804 and 1809 as the main building for the Imperial University of Dorpat, it was designed by the architect Johann Wilhelm Krause.

The building has been restored many times, including after a fire in 1965, and most recently in 2007.

It features a large auditorium, as well as lock-up rooms in the attic used during the 19th century to detain students as punishment.

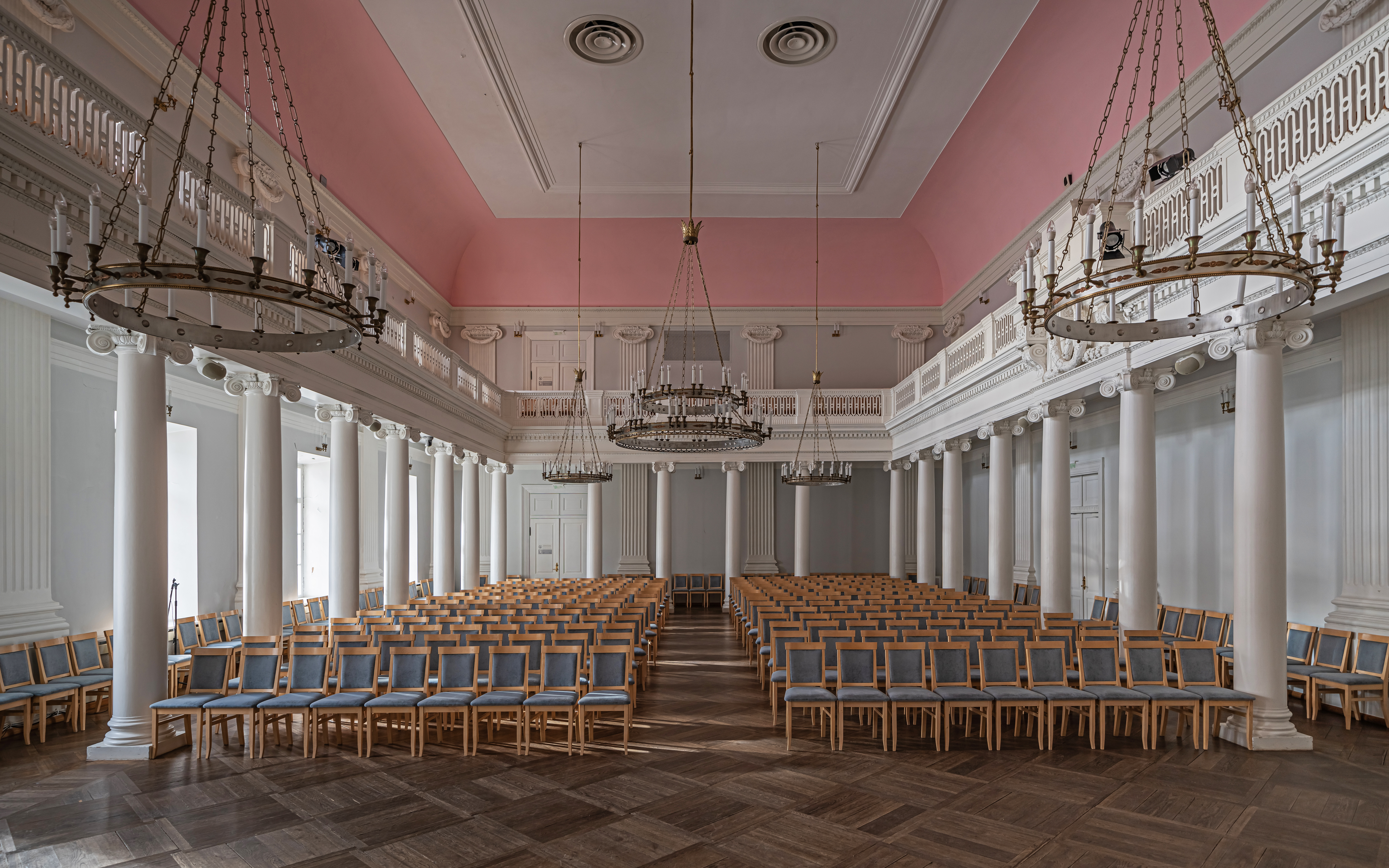
The auditorium

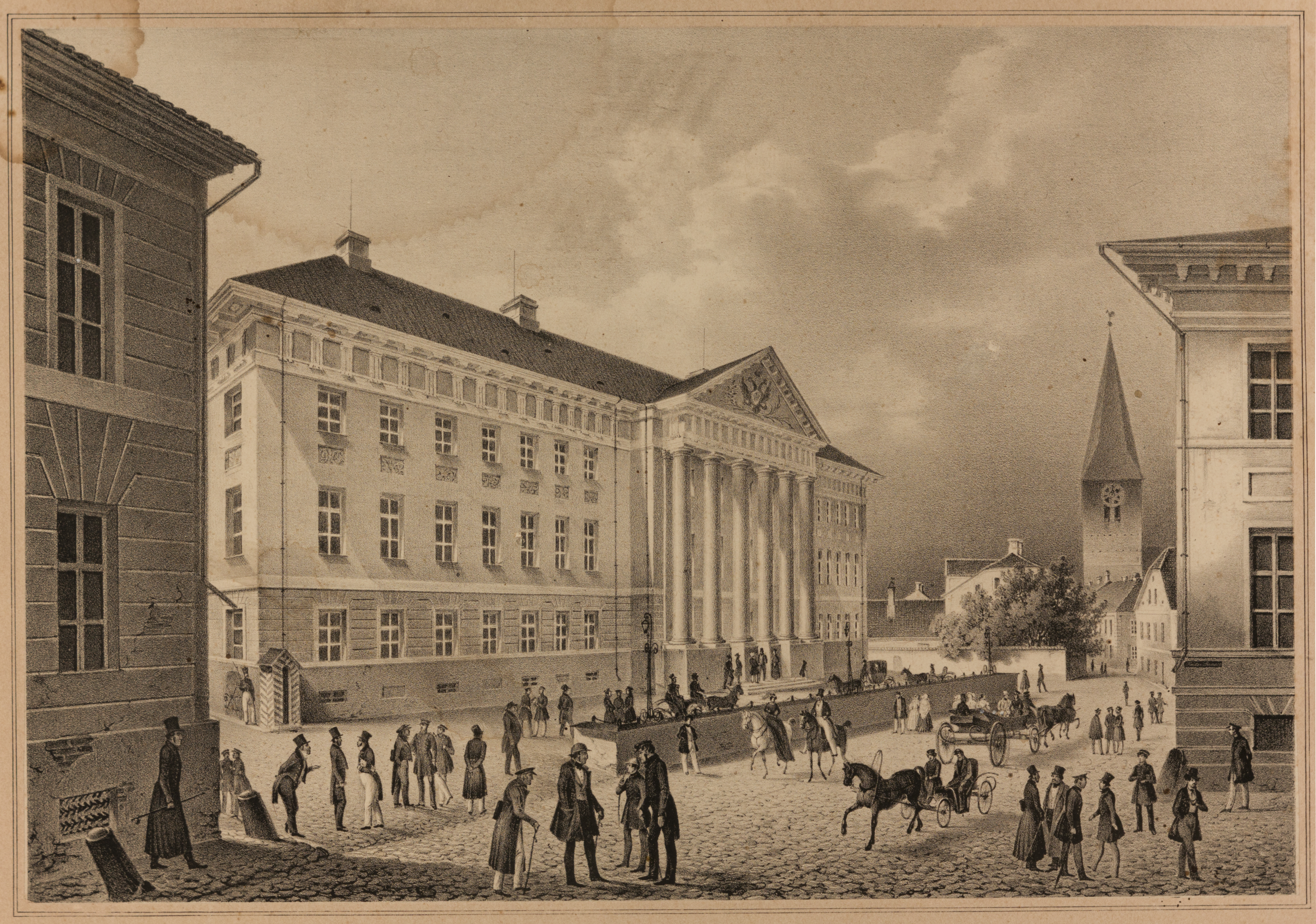
Main building of Tartu University in 1845

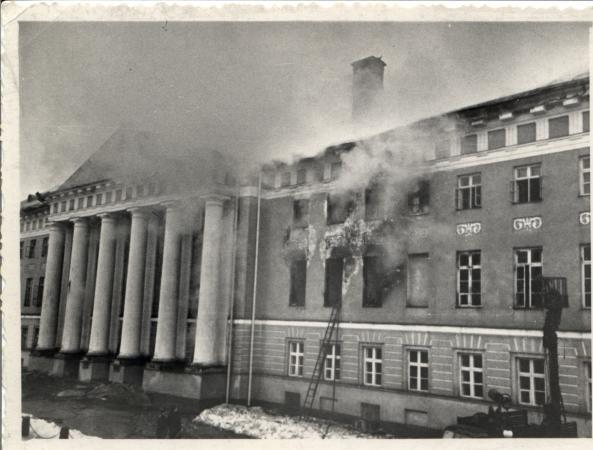
Main building of Tartu University on fire in 1965
