= Tartu Town Hall =

Town hall in Tartu, Estonia

Coordinates: 58°22′48″N 26°43′18″E

- Tartu raekoda
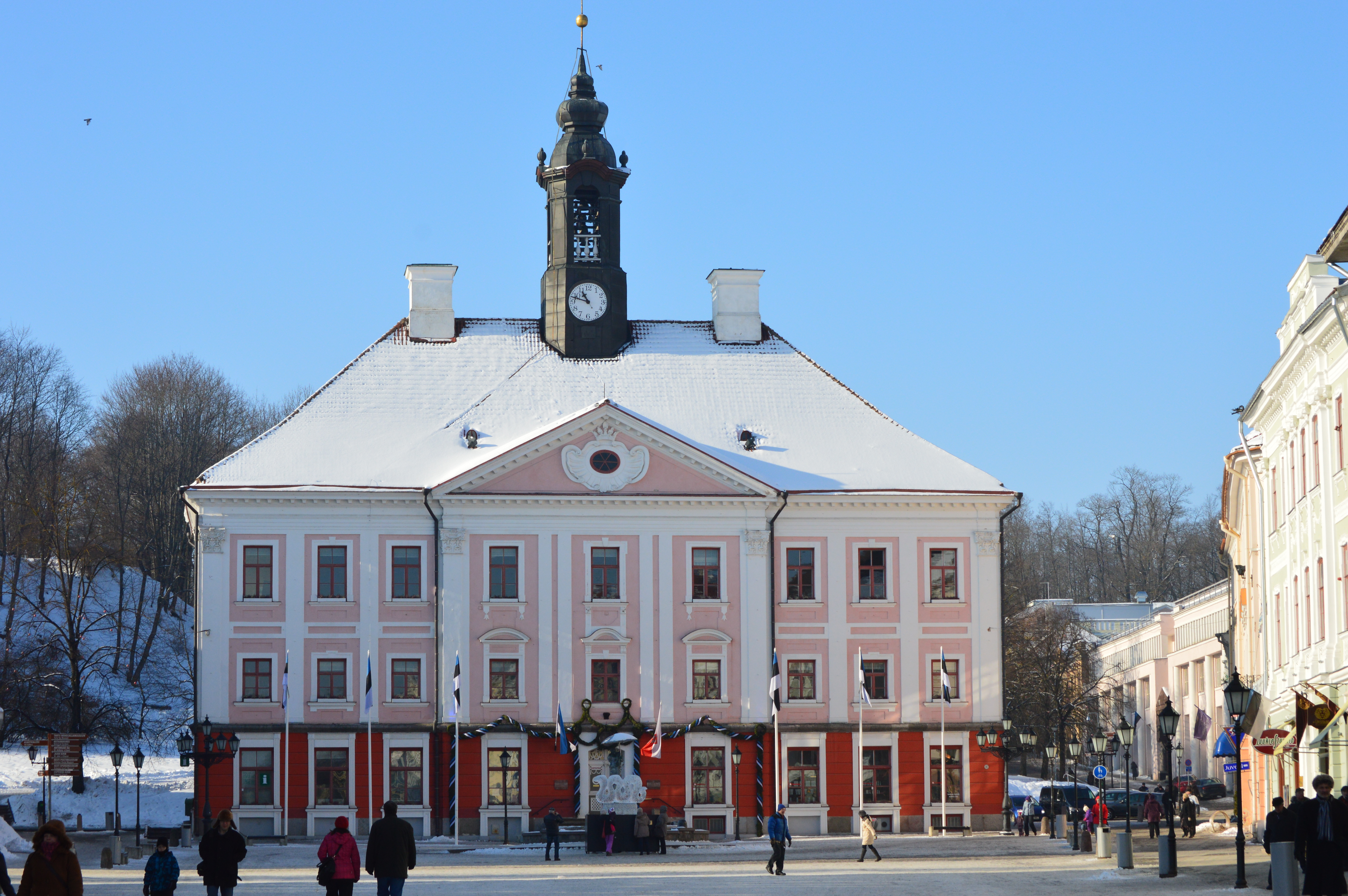
- Tartu Town Hall
- Interactive map of the Tartu Town Hall area

General information
- Type: Town hall
- Location: Tartu, Estonia
- Completed: 1789

Design and construction
- Architect: Johann Heinrich Bartholomäus Walther

Tartu Town Hall (Estonian: Tartu raekoda) is the seat of the city government of Tartu, Estonia. It is located on Town hall square, in the city centre.

== History and architecture ==
The history of the town hall pre-dates the current town hall, as the present building is the third consecutive town hall built on the same location. It was erected, following the Great fire of Tartu, between 1782 and 1789 to designs by the German architect Johann Heinrich Bartholomäus Walther. From the outset, the building was designed to house a number of tenants in addition to the city government; a prison and a storage for weighs and measures were included already in the original drawings. The town hall has always suffered from a lack of space, and to this day a pharmacy is located in parts of the premises. The architect and mason, J. H. B. Walther, also worked on the Von Bock House which was across the square and was being completed at the same time as the town hall was constructed.

The town hall is built in an early Neoclassical style, with Rococo and Baroque details, such as the steeple containing the carillon (which is still played daily). The town hall shows many stylistic similarities with the somewhat earlier town hall of Narva.

== Christmas ==
Like many town halls in Finland, for example Rauma, Porvoo and Turku, Christmas Peace is proclaimed from Tartu's Town Hall just before Christmas.

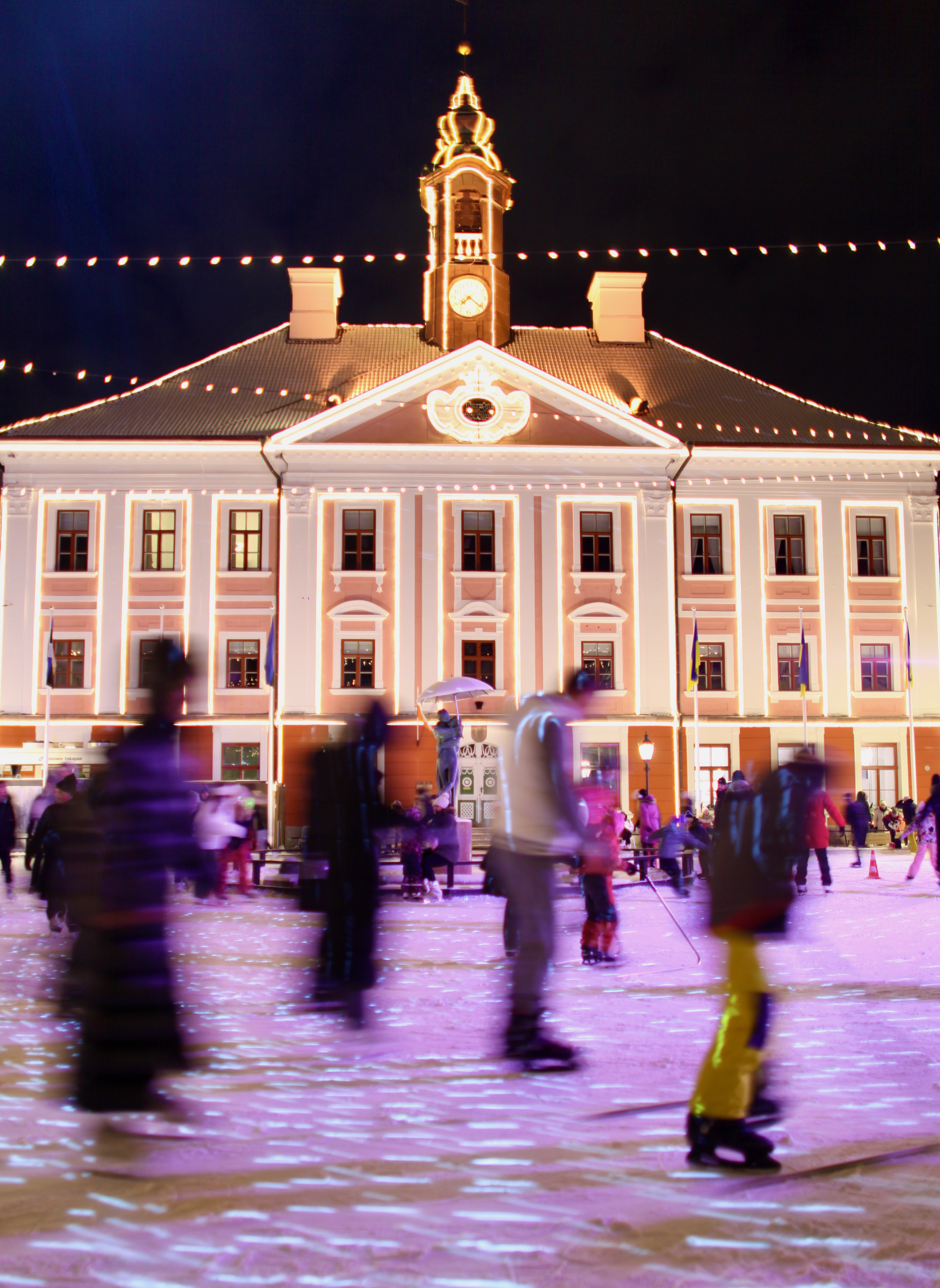
Skaters in front of Tartu Town Hall in December (Estonia 2023)

== See also ==
- Narva Town Hall
- Porvoo Old Town Hall
- Rauma Old Town Hall
