= List of bridges in Estonia =

This is the list of bridges located in Estonia. The list is incomplete.

Name	Length	Location (county, parish)	Further info	Image
Inglisild		Tartu		
Kaarsild		Tartu		
Kroonuaia Bridge		Tartu		
Kuradisild		Tartu		
Narva Railway Bridge		Narva		
Raudsild		Tartu		
Saaremaa Bridge		Saare County	proposed	
Sõpruse Bridge		Narva		
Sõpruse Bridge / Friendship Bridge, Tartu		Tartu		
Stone Bridge		Tartu	destroyed in 1941	
Vabaduse Bridge		Tartu		
