= Ülo Õun =

Estonian sculptor (1940-1988)

- Born: 30 April 1940; Tartu, Estonia
- Died: 7 March 1988 (aged 47); Tallinn, Estonia
- Resting place: Metsakalmistu
- Education: Tartu State University; State Art Institute of the Estonian SSR
- Occupation: Sculptor
- Years active: 1968–1988
- Spouse: Ināra Zvaigzne (m. 1967–1988)
- Children: 3
- Awards: Kristjan Raud Art Award (1979)

Ülo Õun (30 April 1940 – 7 March 1988) was an Estonian sculptor whose career began in the late 1960s and came to prominence in the 1970s. Õun mainly worked as a portrait and figural sculptor and was known for his works in colored plaster and bronze.

== Early life and education ==
Ülo Õun was born and raised in Tartu, one of two children of Ado and Alma Õun (née Lellep). He graduated from Tartu Secondary School No. 2 (now, the Miina Härma Gymnasium) in 1958. Afterward, he studied mathematics at Tartu State University (now, the University of Tartu) for a year, before enrolling at the State Art Institute of the Estonian SSR (now, the Estonian Academy of Arts) to study visual arts, with an emphasis on sculpting. He graduated from the institution in 1966.

== Career ==
After graduating, Õun worked as a taxidermist at the Estonian Museum of Natural History. His first exhibition was held at the Tallinn Art Hall gallery, with artists Ellen Koll and Aili Vint in 1970.

In 1971, he became a freelance artist and began sculpting, mainly portraits and figural sculptures. He rose to national prominence in the 1970s, with a style that art critics have described as "friendly grotesque"; Õun's sculptures could not easily be associated with any art movement known in Estonia at that time or compared with any "significant work". He distinguished himself from the generation of Estonian sculptural innovators of the 1960s by his characteristic deformation of form. Õun was fascinated by color, fluidity, and the variability of forms in his work and addressed the subjective spiritual nature of man. His early exhibitions aroused passionate support and admiration from the public and critics, but was not without detractors.

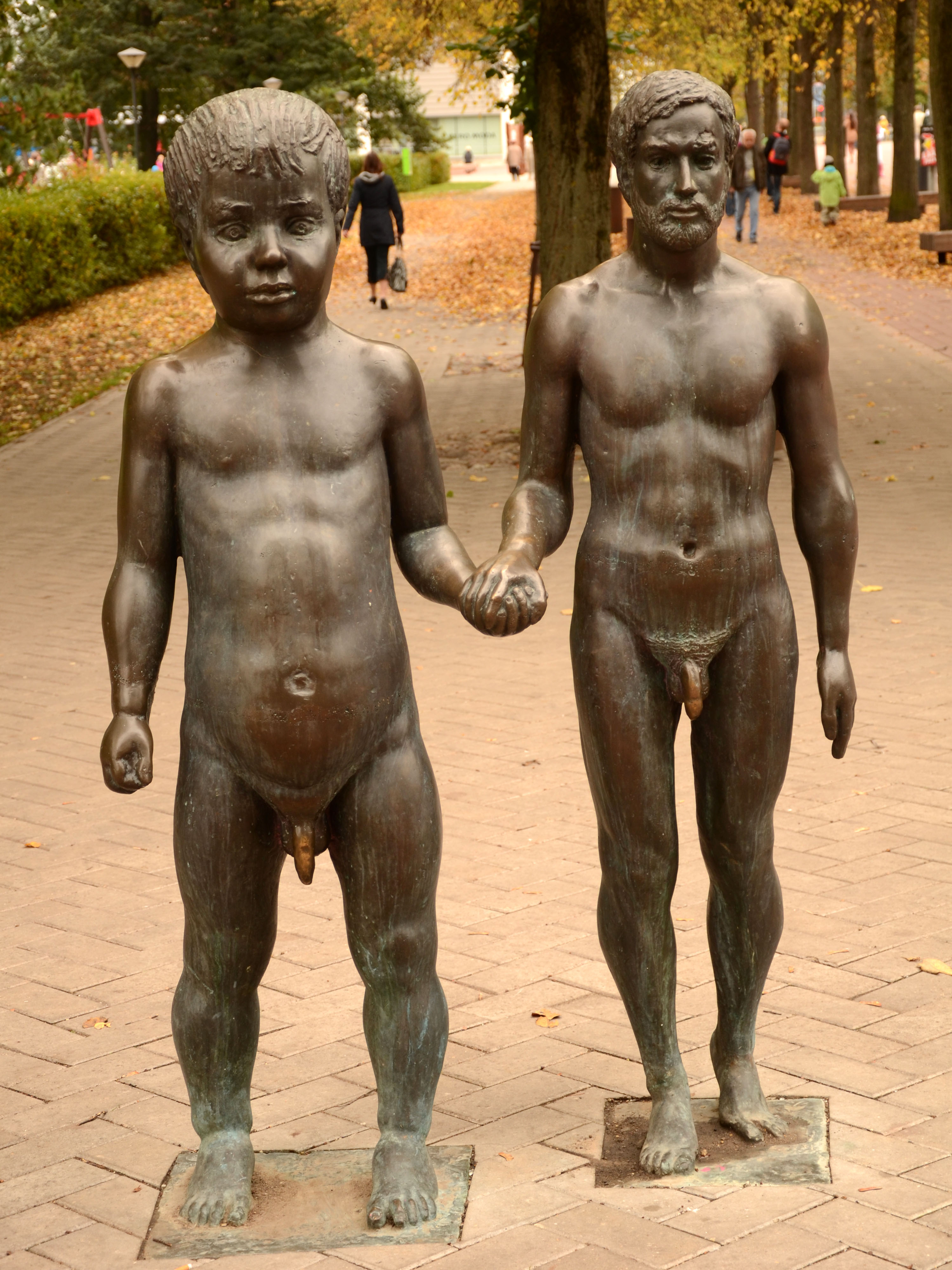
Isa ja poeg (1977) on Küüni Street in Tartu

One of Õun's most notable sculptures is Isa ja poeg (English: Father and Son), created in plaster in 1977. The sculpture depicts Õun and his 18-month-old son Kristjan nude, holding hands and standing at the same height. The work symbolizes the relationship between different generations, and the ephemeral period of childhood. The sculpture caused a furor when it was initially exhibited at the Tallinn Art Hall in 1977. In 1987, it was cast in bronze and originally installed in Tallinn. In the autumn of 2001, the Tartu City Government bought the sculpture and intended to install it on the slope of Toomemägi next to the Inglisild (Angel's Bridge). A granite base for the sculpture was made, but an ordinance was brought to light that only artwork and monuments related to the University of Tartu could be installed on Toomemägi. The sculpture was later unveiled for permanent display on Küüni Street on Child Protection Day, 1 June 2004, in Tartu central park, facing Town Hall Square. Isa ja poeg has become a well-known landmark of Tartu.

In 1978, Õun created portrait sculptures of Estonian cultural figures: painter Tiit Pääsuke, artist Kaljo Põllu, and actor and theater pedagogue Voldemar Panso, for which he won the Kristjan Raud Art Award the following year. Other portrait sculptures by Õun include those of composers Gustav Ernesaks and Veljo Tormis, author Eduard Vilde, actor and poet Juhan Viiding, actress Elle Kull, zoologist Harald Haberman, artists Jüri Palm and Villu Jõgeva, and actors and theater pedagogues Kaarel Ird, Theodor Altermann, Paul Pinna, and Mikk Mikiver. His monument to Baltic German physiologist Alexander Schmidt was opened in Kassitoome park on the grounds of the University of Tartu in 1982.

In 1981 and 1984, he completed two monuments titled Monument to the Lives Lost in the Second World War (Estonian: Teises maailmasõjas hukkunute mälestusmärk). The first, in the town of Kallaste in Tartu County on the shore of Lake Peipus was a bronze sculpture of the nude torso of a nude young man with residual limb stumps which was erected on a high granite socle designed by architect Ike Volkov. Following the public unveiling of the sculpture on 8 May 1981, there was an immediate backlash from the mostly Russian-speaking religious locals, who found the nudity and the posed figure’s similarity to the crucifixion of Christ objectionable. Local complaints eventually reached high ranking Communist Party officials in Moscow and Soviet authorities had the sculpture's nudity covered by a pair of specially cast bronze "briefs". The second Monument to the Lives Lost in the Second World War was opened in 1984, in the Tornimäe cemetery on the island of Saaremaa. The central figure is a bronze sculpture of a nude woman holding a broken rose in her outstretched hands standing on a massive raised grey marble platform, which is ensconced by a geometric structure of four concrete pillars which connect above into a pyramid-like shape, symbolizing a chapel.

Õun's artistic output was prolific during his twenty-year career. He held numerous solo and shared exhibitions, and his world can be found in several institutions and public installations throughout the country, including the Tartu Art Museum and the Art Museum of Estonia.

== Personal life and death ==
Ülo Õun married Latvian leather artist Inara Õun (née Zvaigzne; 1941–2012) in 1967. The couple had three children: two daughters and a son, Kristjan. Õun died in 1988, aged 47 and was interred in Tallinn's Forest Cemetery.

== Legacy ==
Several documentaries were made profiling Ülo Õun during his lifetime, the first significant one being the 1984 Arvo Iho directed 29 minutit Ülo Õunaga, for Tallinnfilm. In 1986, he was profiled in the Aime Kala directed documentary short Pildi sisse minek: Ülo Õun for Eesti Rahvusringhääling.

In 2009, an exhibition of a selection of Õun's work curated by Juta Kivimäe titled Ülo Õun. Kunstnik katkeval avastusrajal (English: Ülo Õun. Artist on an Intermittent Trail of Discovery) was held at the Kumu museum in Tallinn. The exhibition was awarded the Best Exhibition of the Year by the Ministry of Culture of Estonia.
