= Bar (establishment) =

Establishment serving alcoholic beverages for consumption on the premises

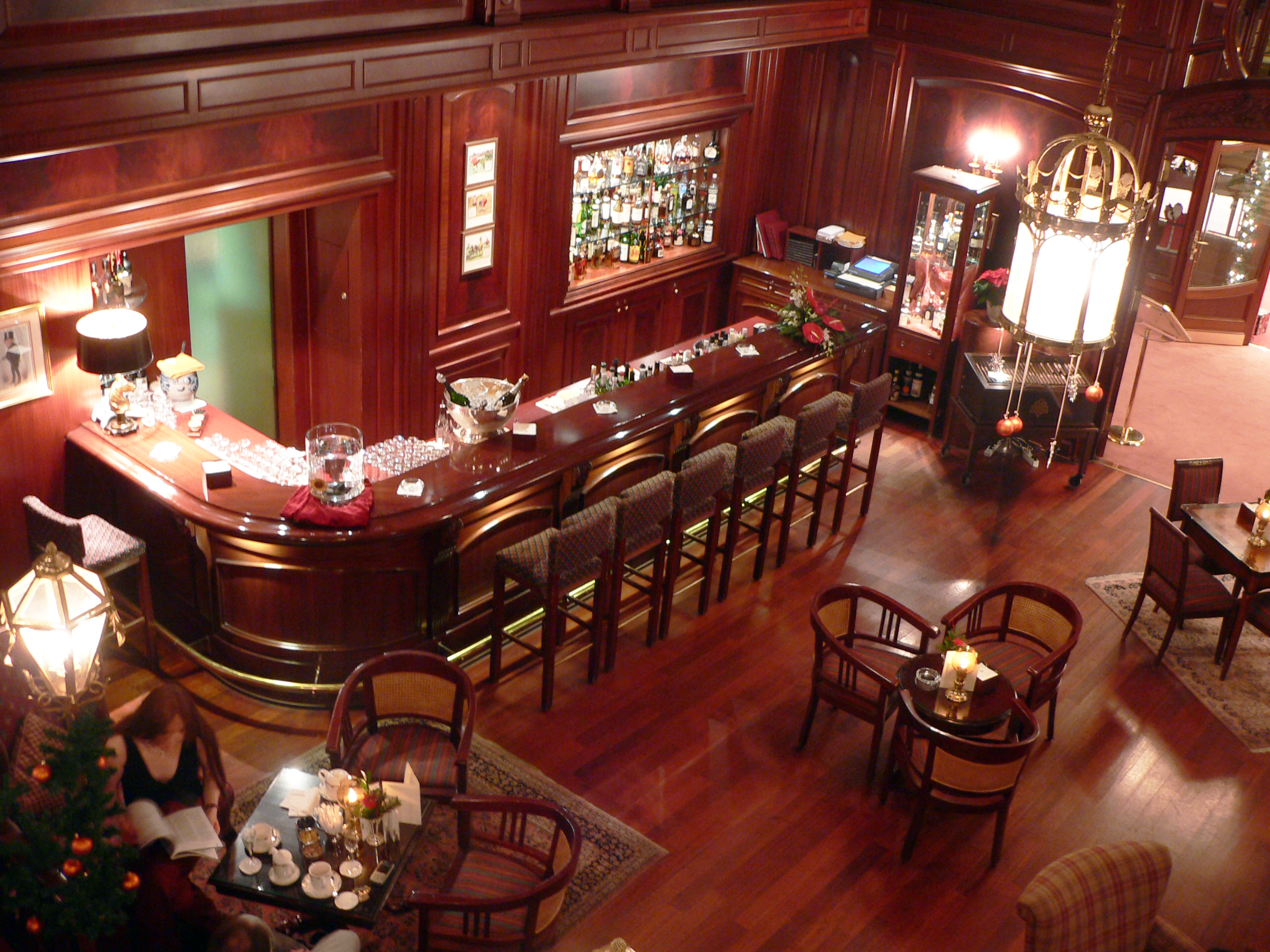
A hotel bar in Switzerland

A bar, also known as a saloon, a tavern or tippling house, or sometimes as a pub (public house) or club, is a retail business that serves alcoholic beverages, such as beer, wine, liquor, cocktails, and other beverages such as mineral water and soft drinks. Bars often also sell snacks, such as chips (crisps) or peanuts, for consumption on their premises. Some types of bars, such as pubs, may also serve food from a restaurant menu.

The term "bar" derives from a metal or wooden bar (barrier) often located along the length of a countertop where drinks are prepared and served by a bartender from an available selection of liquors behind them; these countertops are built with a depth between 18–24 inches (0.46–0.61 m)), smaller than that of an ordinary dining table. The term bar eventually extended to the entirety of the establishment in which the bar counter was located.

== History ==
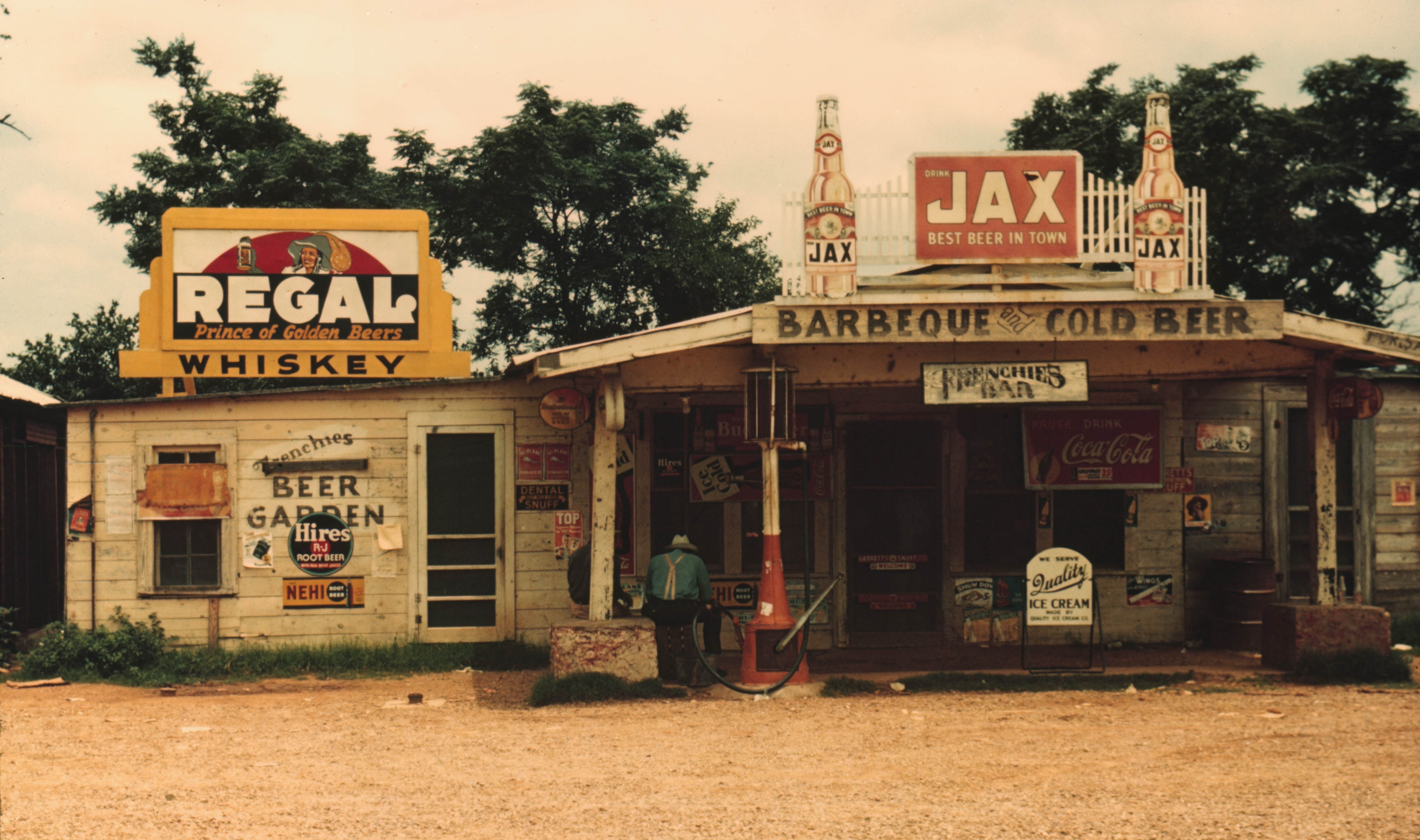
A Depression-era bar in Melrose, Louisiana

There have been many different names for public drinking spaces throughout history. In the Thirteen Colonies of North America, a tavern was a meeting place. During the 19th century, saloons were very important to the leisure time of the working class. Today, even when an establishment uses a different name, such as "tavern" or "saloon" or, in the United Kingdom, a "pub", the area of the establishment where the bartender pours or mixes beverages is normally called "the bar".

The sale and/or consumption of alcoholic beverages was prohibited in the first half of the 20th century in several countries. In the United States, illegal bars during Prohibition were called "speakeasies", "blind pigs", and "blind tigers".

== Legal restrictions ==
Laws in many U.S. states, such as California, prohibit minors from entering a bar. In the UK, minors are permitted to be in a bar, though there are many bars that also serve food. In many jurisdictions, if those under legal drinking age are allowed to enter, as is the case with pubs that serve food, they are not allowed to drink; in the U.S., there are 8 states where children may drink in a pub if accompanied by their parents. In some jurisdictions, bars cannot serve a patron who is already intoxicated. Cities and towns usually have legal restrictions on where bars may be located and on the types of alcohol they may serve to their customers. Some bars may have a license to serve beer and wine, but not hard liquor. In some jurisdictions, patrons buying alcohol must also order food. In some jurisdictions, bar owners have a legal liability for the conduct of patrons who they serve (this liability may arise in cases of driving under the influence which cause injuries or deaths).

Many Islamic countries prohibit bars as well as the possession or sale of alcohol for religious reasons, while others, including Qatar and the United Arab Emirates, allow bars in some specific areas, but only permit non-Muslims to drink in them.

== Types ==
Outdoor bar in Paso Robles, California, United States of America

A bar's owners and managers choose the bar's name, décor, drink menu, lighting, and other elements which they think will attract a certain kind of patron. However, they have only limited influence over who patronizes their establishment. Thus, a bar originally intended for one demographic profile can become popular with another. For example, a gay or lesbian bars with a dance or disco floor might, over time, attract an increasingly heterosexual clientele, or a blues bar may become a biker bar if most its patrons are bikers. Bars can also be an integral part of larger venues. For example, hotels, casinos and nightclubs are usually home to one or several bars. Other types of bar include:

- A cocktail lounge is an upscale bar that is typically located within a hotel, restaurant or airport.
- A full bar serves liquor, cocktails, wine, and beer.
- A wine bar is a bar that focuses on wine rather than on beer or liquor. Patrons of these bars may taste wines before deciding to buy them. Some wine bars also serve small plates of food or other snacks.
- A beer bar focuses on beer, particularly craft beer, rather than on wine or liquor. A brew pub has an on-site brewery and serves craft beers.
- "Fern bar" is an American slang term for an upscale or preppy (or yuppie) bar.
- A music bar is a bar that presents live music as an attraction, such as a piano bar.
- A dive bar, often referred to simply as a "dive", is a very informal bar which may be considered by some to be disreputable.
- A non-alcoholic bar is a bar that does not serve alcoholic beverages.
- A strip club is a bar with nude entertainers.
- A bar and grill is also a restaurant.

Some persons may designate either a room or an area of a room as a home bar. Arrangements can vary from being simple, with bottles of alcohol, cups, and perhaps basic bar supplies, to full bars.

=== Entertainment ===
Bars categorized by the kind of entertainment they offer:

- Arcade bars, in which the bar have video games on cabinets and consoles
- Blues bars, specializing in the live blues style of music
- Comedy bars, specializing in stand-up comedy entertainment
- Dance bars, which have a dance floor where patrons dance to recorded music. Typically, if a venue has a large dance floor, focuses primarily on dancing rather than seated drinking, and hires professional DJs, it is considered to be a nightclub or discothèque rather than a bar.
- Karaoke bars, with nightly karaoke as entertainment
- Music bars, specializing in live music (i.e. concerts). Piano bars are one example.
- Drag bars, which specialize in drag performances as entertainment
- Salsa bars, where patrons dance to Latin salsa music
- Sports bars, which are furnished with sports-related memorabilia and theming, and typically contain a large number of televisions used to broadcast major sporting events for their patrons.
- A tiki bar offers a fully immersive and entertaining environment, including tropical cocktails, tiki carvings, exotica music, a dark, windowless space with light fixtures lending a soft glow, and nautical brick-a-brac that hints at romantic travels to exotic lands.
- Topless bars, where topless female employees dance or serve drinks. In India, these bars are called dance bars, which is distinct from the type of "dance bar" discussed above.

== Bar (counter) ==
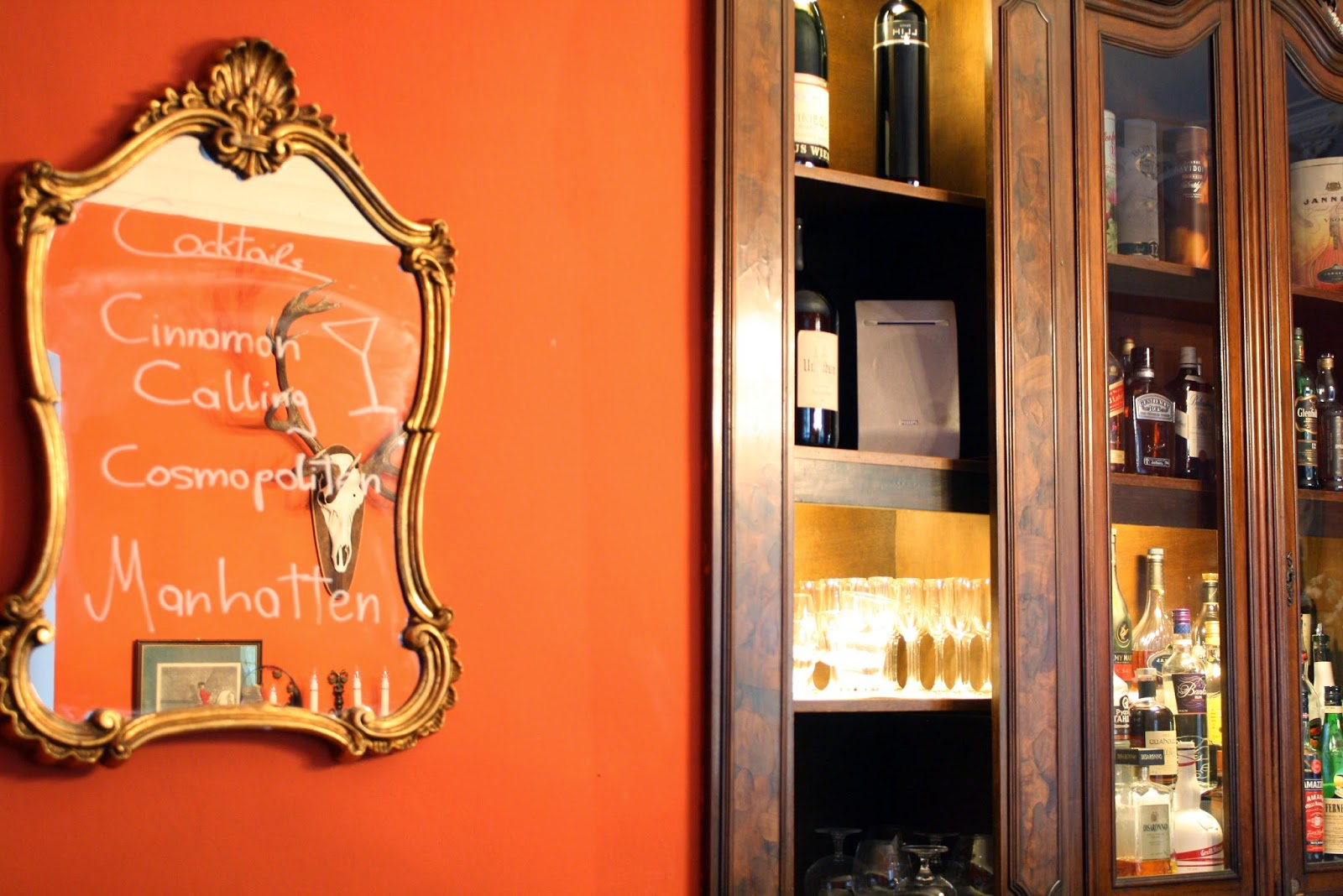
Liquor and wine bottles displayed in a cabinet behind a bar in Baden, Austria

The counter at which drinks are served by a bartender is called "the bar". This term is applied, as a synecdoche, to drinking establishments called "bars". This counter typically stores a variety of beers, wines, liquors, and non-alcoholic ingredients, and is organized to facilitate the bartender's work. Patrons sit in high stools in lieu of chairs typical of restaurant interiors, bar stools have a max height of 30 inches (0.76 m) lower than the counter's at 40–45 inches (1.0–1.1 m).

Counters for serving other types of food and drink may also be called bars. Examples of this usage of the word include snack bars, sushi bars, juice bars, salad bars, dairy bars, and ice cream sundae bars.

== Gallery ==
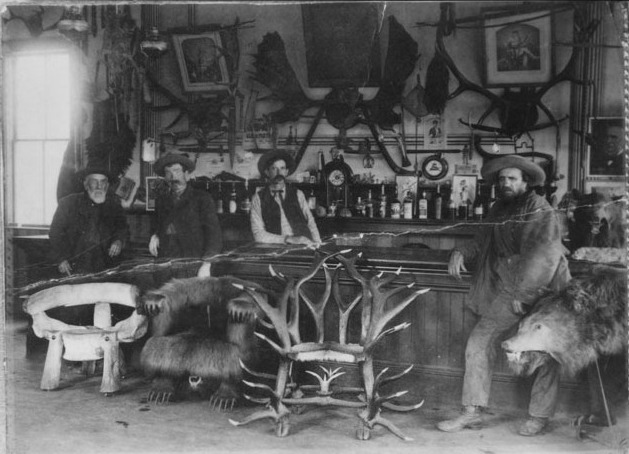
Interior of Seth Kinman's Table Bluff Hotel and Saloon in Table Bluff, California, 1889

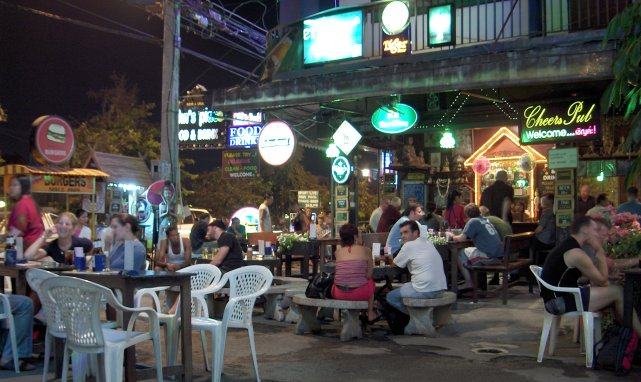
Tourists sit outside a bar in Chiang Mai, Thailand

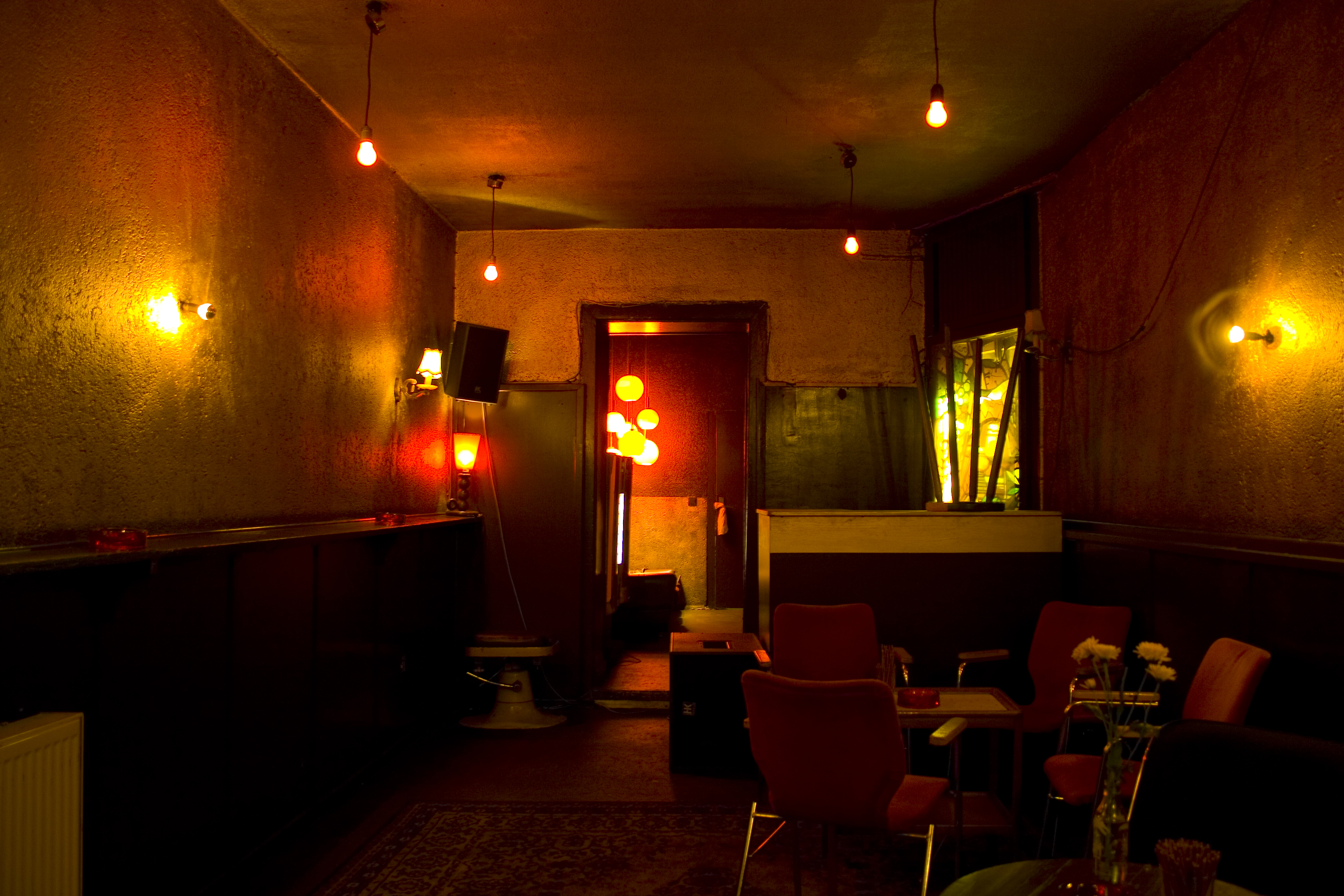
A retro bar in Berlin, Germany

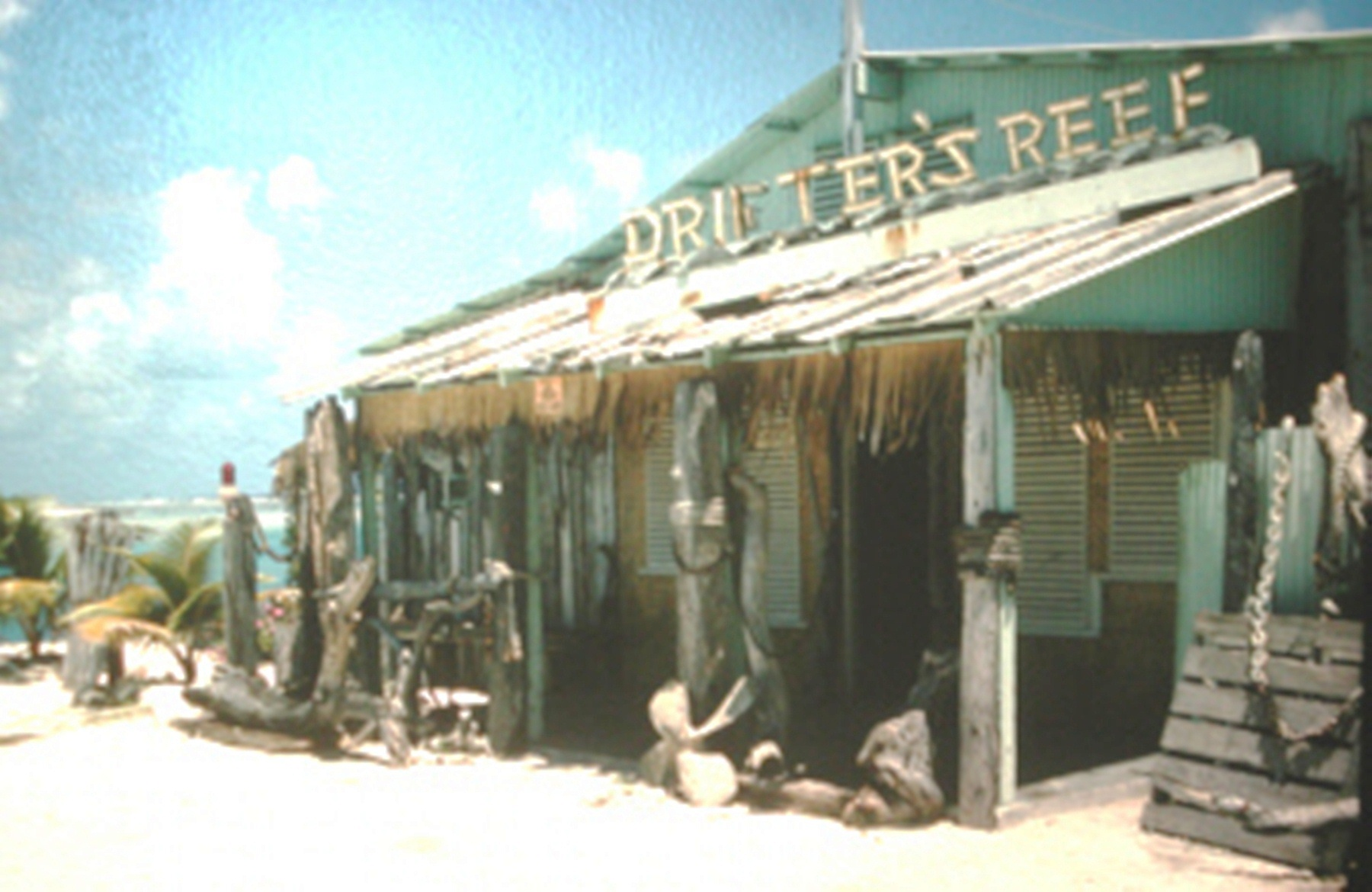
The original Drifter's Reef bar at Wake Island

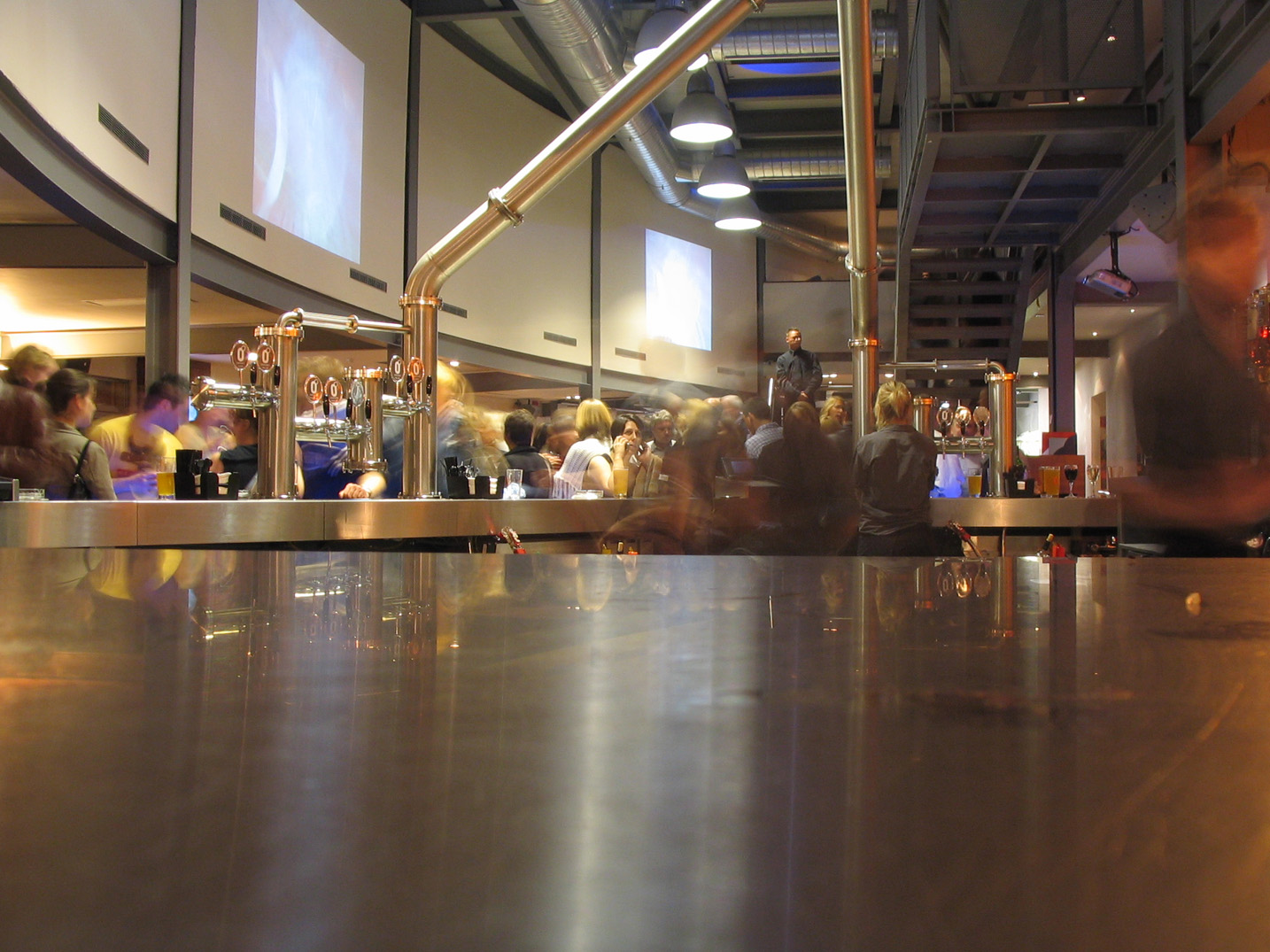
A bar in Bristol, England

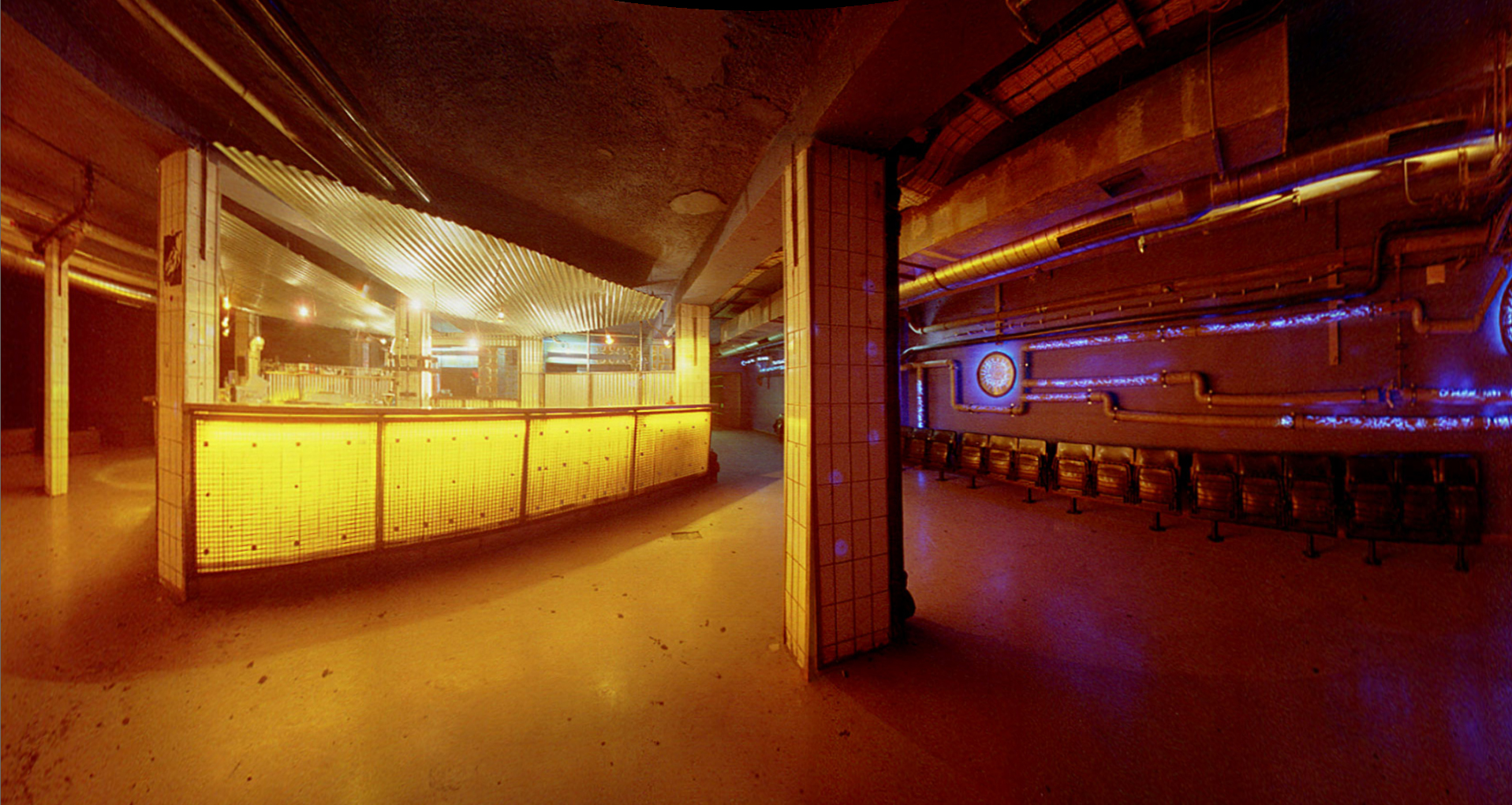
Bar inside a nightclub in Munich, Germany

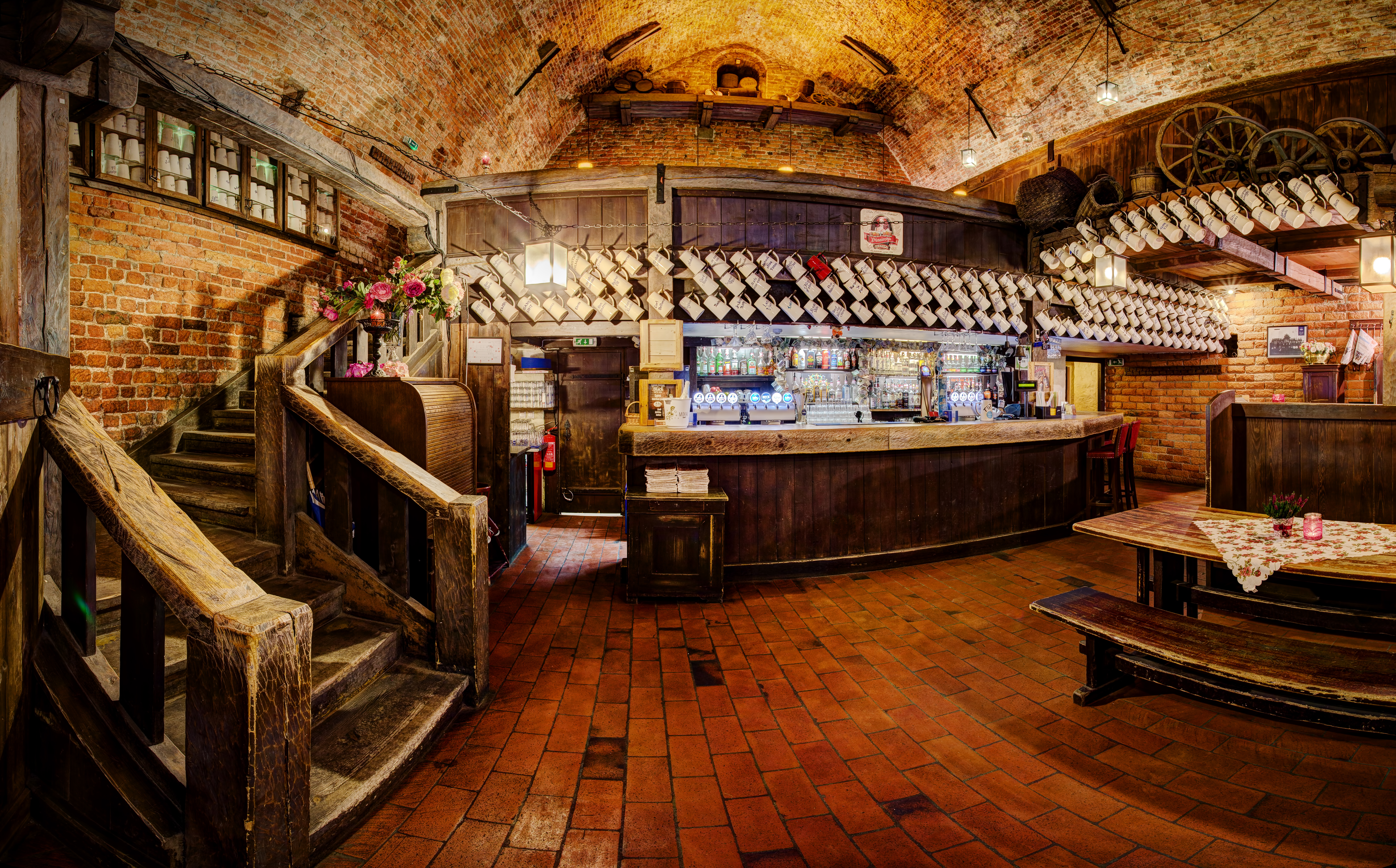
Gunpowder Cellar of Tartu, a former 18th-century gunpowder cellar and current beer restaurant in Tartu, Estonia

== In fiction ==
Bars are a popular setting for fictional works, and in many cases, authors and other creators have developed imaginary bar locations that have become notable, such as the bar for Cheers, Cocktails and Dreams bar in the film Cocktail (1988), the Copacabana bar in the crime film Goodfellas, the rough and tumble Double Deuce in Road House (1989), The Kit Kat Klub in Cabaret, the Korova Milk Bar in the dystopian novel and film adaptation of A Clockwork Orange, the Mos Eisley cantina-bar in Star Wars Episode IV: A New Hope (1977), and the Steinway Beer Garden from the crime-themed video game Grand Theft Auto IV.

== See also ==
- Alcohol-free bar
- Beer garden
- Cellarette (liquor cabinet)
- Dive bar
- Drinking culture
- Honky-tonk
- Hostess bar
- Izakaya
- Juke joint
- Last call
- List of bartenders
- List of public house topics
- Pub
- Shebeen
- Speakeasy
- Tavern
- Tiki bar
- Western saloon

== Bibliography ==
- Hamill, Pete (1994). A Drinking Life: A Memoir. New York: Little, Brown and Company. ISBN 978-0-316-34102-8.
- Maloney, Ralph (2012). How to Drink Like a Mad Man. Mineola, New York: Dover Publications. ISBN 978-0-486-48352-8. A humorous account of the drinking culture of Madison Avenue advertising executives during the 1960s. Originally published in 1962 as The 24-Hour Drink Book: A Guide to Executive Survival.
- Moehringer, J.R. (2005). The Tender Bar: A Memoir. New York: Hyperion. ISBN 978-1-4013-0064-7.
