= Friendship Bridge (Estonia-Russia) =

Bridge in Narva, Estonia

Coordinates: 59.3766°N 28.2040°E

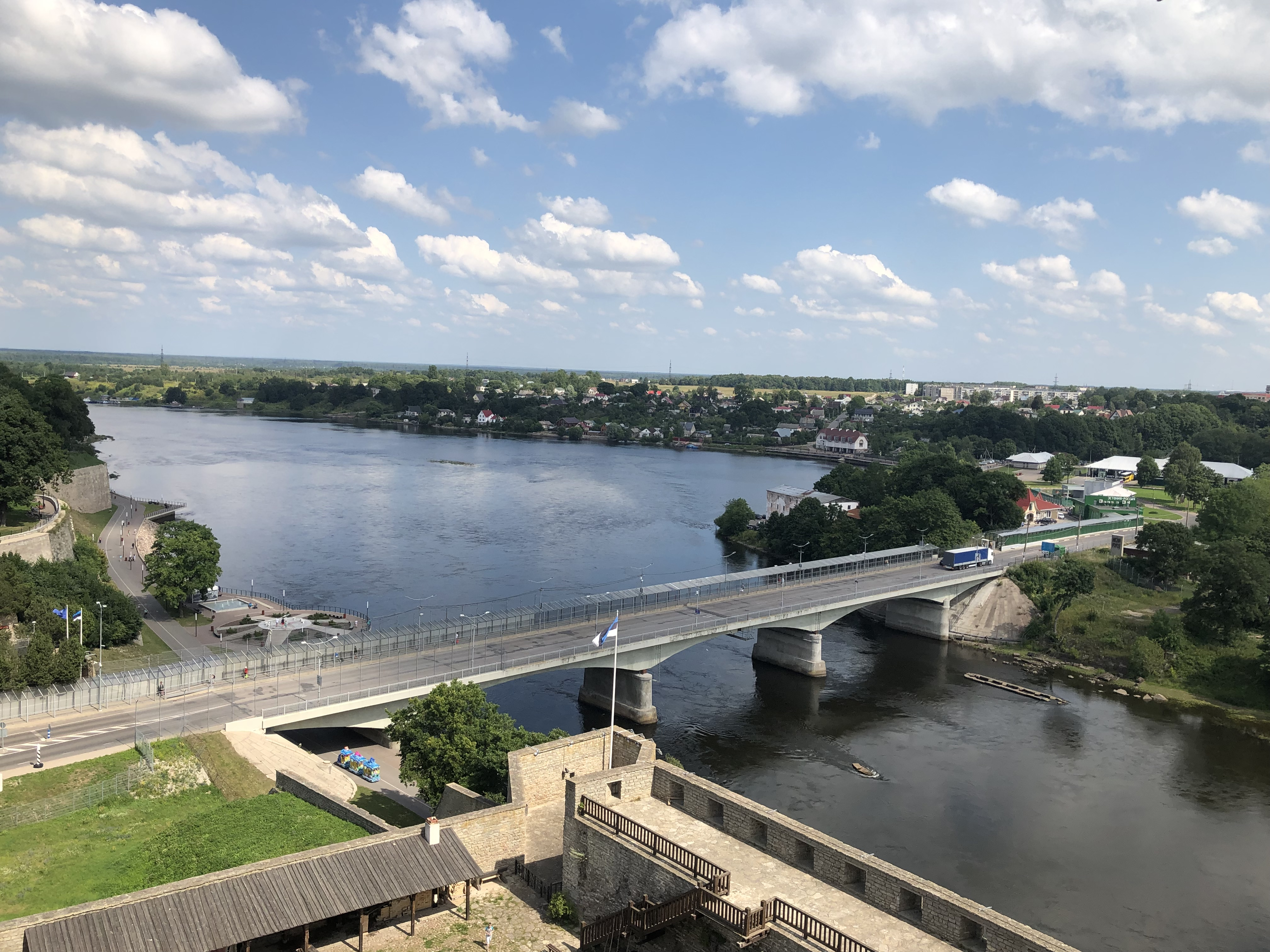
Friendship Bridge

Friendship Bridge (Estonian: Sõpruse sild, Russian: Нарвский мост Дружбы) is a bridge spanning the Narva River. It links the city of Narva in Estonia with the town of Ivangorod in Russia. The Narva Friendship Bridge is part of the European route E20. The length of the bridge is 162 m.

The bridge was finished in October 1960.

== See also ==
- List of international bridges
- Friendship Bridge (Tartu)
