= Toomemägi =

Hill in Tartu, Estonia

Coordinates: 58°22′46″N 26°42′59″E

Toomemägi in the Centre of Tartu

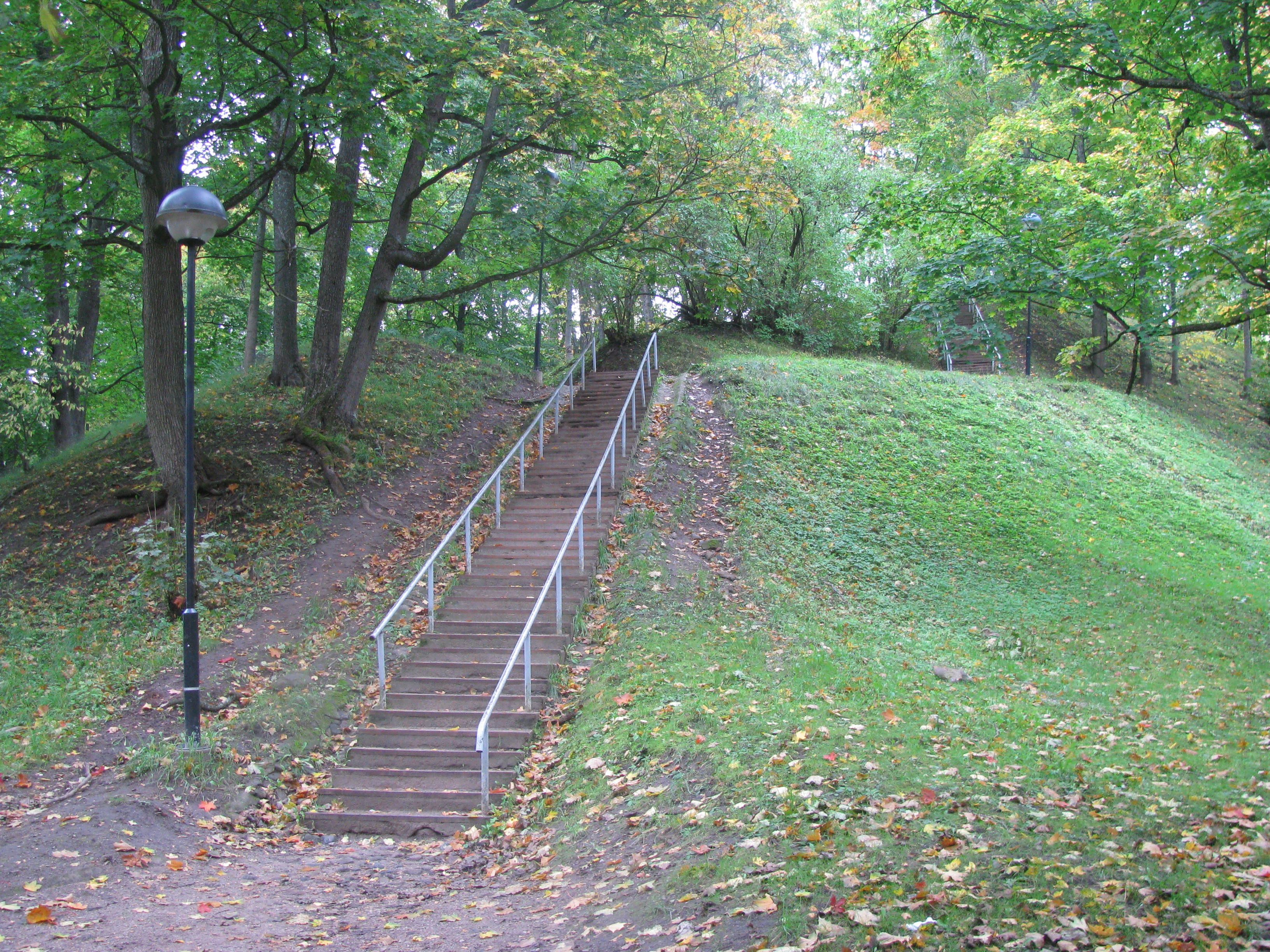
Stairs in Toomemägi

Toomemägi (or Toome Hill; Estonian: Toomemägi or Estonian: Toome) is a hill in Tartu, Estonia.

Aerial view of Toomemägi, toomkirik and Tartu downtown

Geologically, Toomemägi is part of the Emajõgi's ancient valley.

Toomemägi is the site of Tartu's beginnings. By the 7th century CE, local inhabitants had built wooden fortifications on the east side of Toomemägi. In medieval times, there was also a bishop's castle.

Landmarks on Toomemägi:

- Tartu Cathedral
- Gunpowder Cellar of Tartu
- University of Tartu Old Observatory
- several monuments to people related to the University of Tartu
- Supreme Court of Estonia
- Devil's Bridge (Estonian: Kuradisild)
- Angel's Bridge (Estonian: Inglisild)
