= Kaarsild =

Bridge in Tartu, Estonia

Coordinates: 58°22′51″N 26°43′33″E

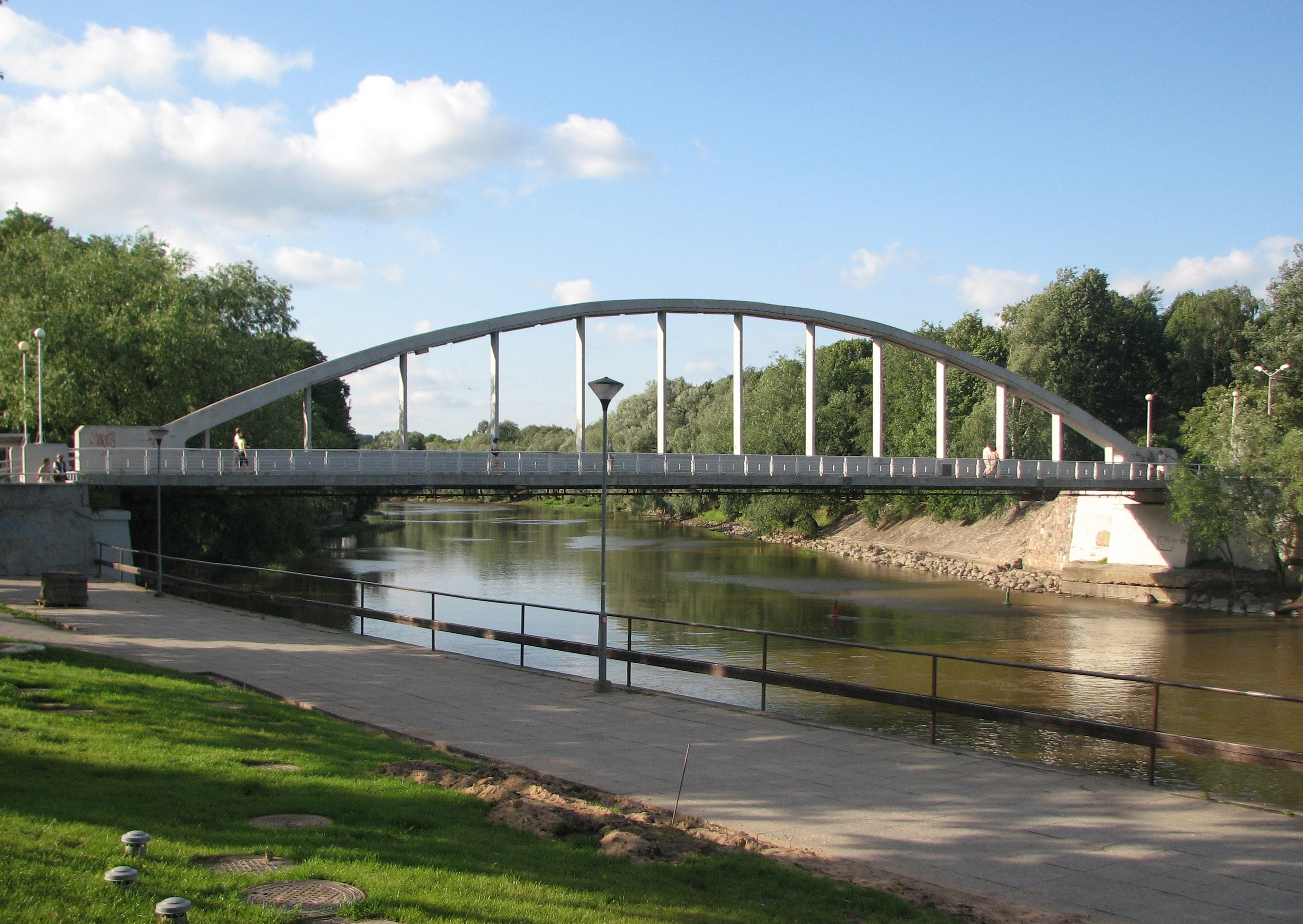
Kaarsild

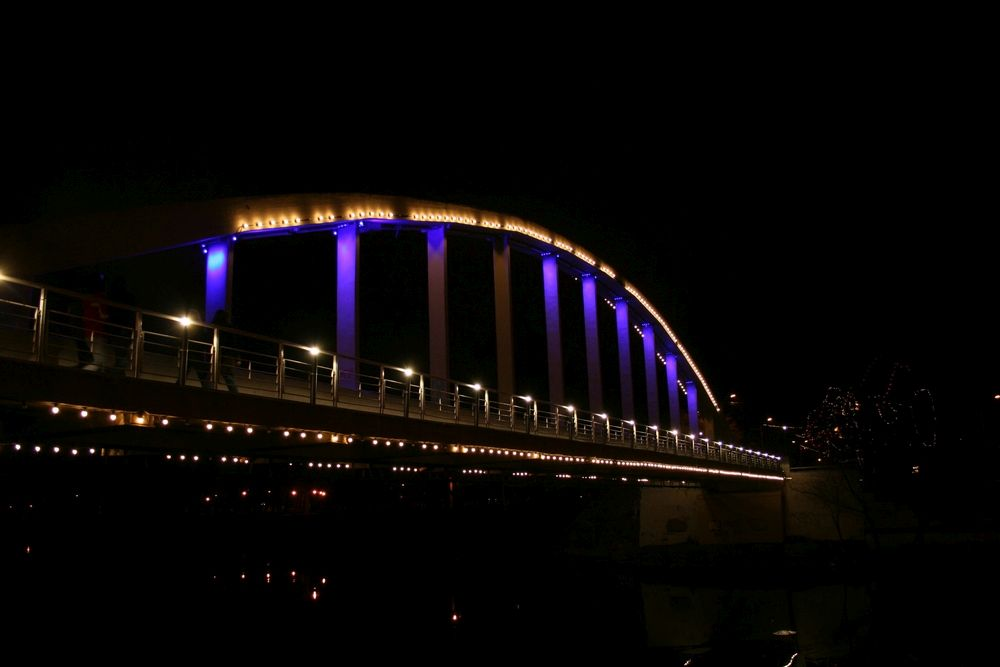
Kaarsild at night

Kaarsild ('Arch Bridge') is a pedestrian bridge in Tartu, Estonia. The bridge connects the city's centre and the Ülejõe District.

The bridge was built in 1957–1959 on the site of the former Stone Bridge; this bridge was destroyed during WWII.

In 2017, the bridge was renovated.

At night, the bridge is illuminated with lighting effects.
