= Raudsild =

Bridge in Tartu, Estonia

Coordinates: 58°23′6.79″N 26°43′26.37″E

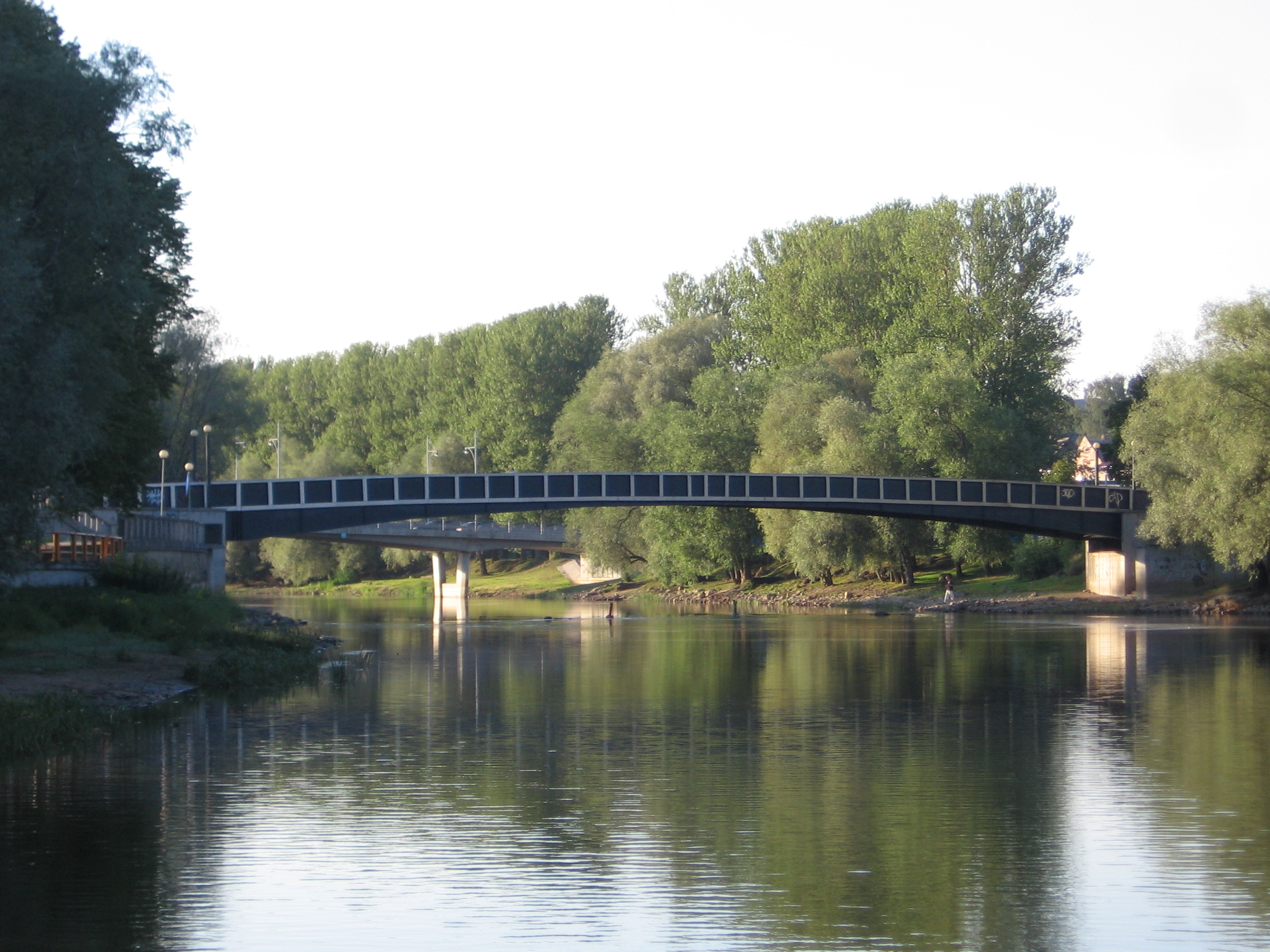
Raudsild (foreground) and Kroonuaia Bridge (summer 2006)

Raudsild (Iron Bridge) was a footbridge across Emajõgi in Tartu, Estonia, which was opened on 3 June 1993, and dismantled again in 2007. It connected the neighbourhood of Kesklinn (city centre) with Ülejõe.

The pedestrian bridge had a design flaw which made it gyrate noticeably at even minor impacts, like a normal-sized person jumping or running across it.

The bridge was taken apart in 2007 to be replaced by Vabaduse Bridge, a 3-lane traffic bridge opened in the summer of 2009. The bridge was planned to be eventually moved upstream and re-assembled for pedestrian traffic. As of 2016, no action has been taken in this regard.

The decision to dismantle Raudsild is sometimes considered being controversial because of the costs and worsening of the conditions for pedestrians in Tartu downtown while not substantially improving the traffic conditions.
