= Friendship Bridge (Tartu) =

Bridge in Tartu, Estonia

Coordinates: 58.3719°N 26.7443°E

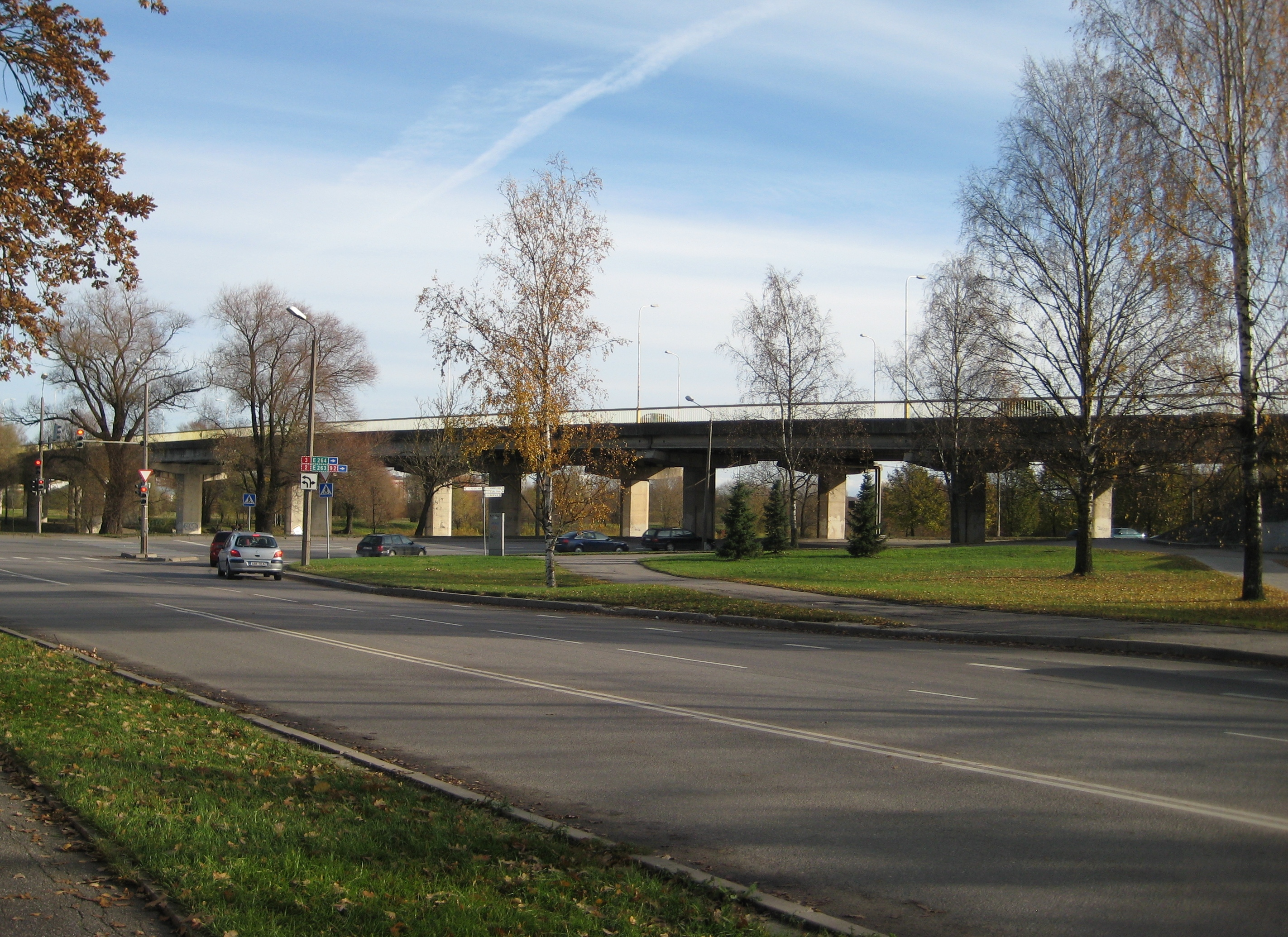
Sõpruse Bridge

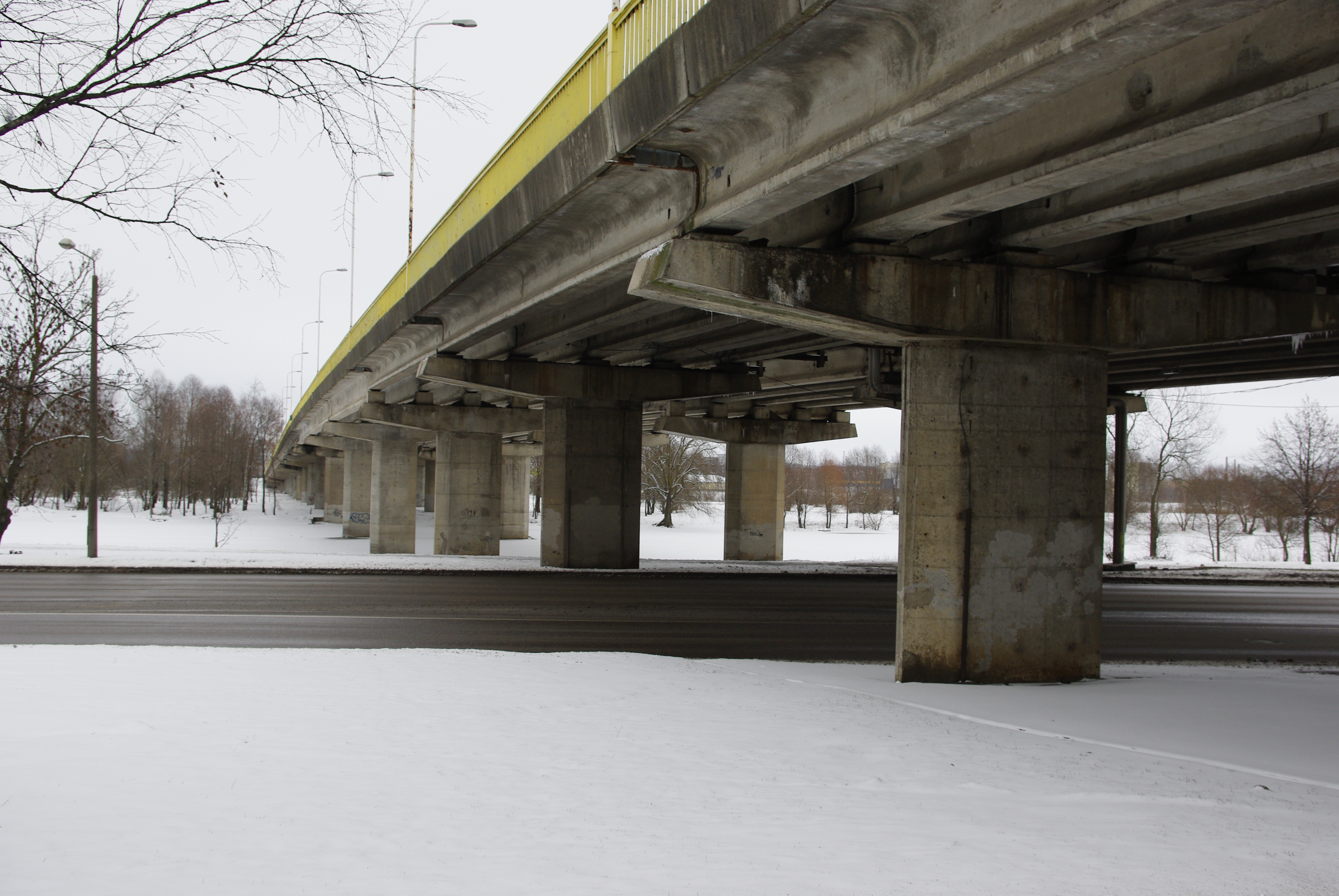
Sõpruse Bridge in 2009

Sõpruse Bridge (Estonian: Sõpruse sild) is a bridge in Tartu, Estonia. This is the longest bridge in Estonia. Its length is 488.2 m and width 26.5 m.

The bridge was opened on 5 December 1981.

== See also ==
- List of bridges in Estonia
