= Ülejõe, Tartu =

Neighbourhood of Tartu, Estonia

Coordinates: 58°23′16.41″N 26°43′38.01″E

Ülejõe
- Neighbourhood of Tartu
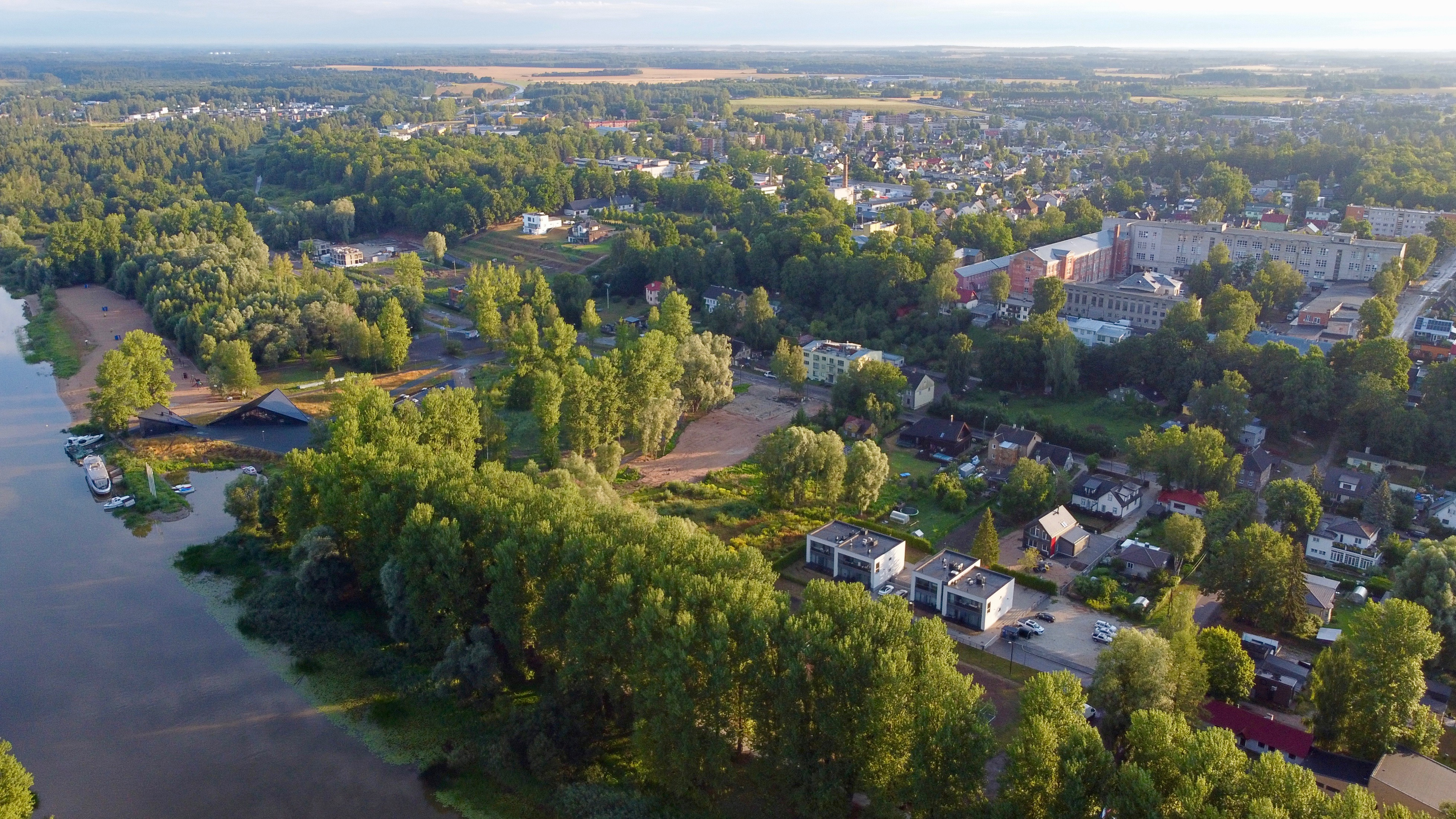

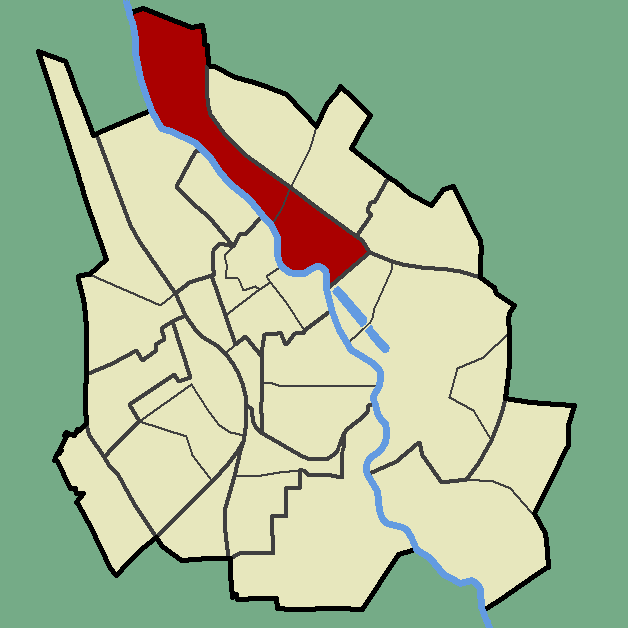
- Location of Ülejõe in Tartu.
- Country: Estonia
- County: Tartu County
- City: Tartu

Area
  - Total: 3.02 km^{2} (1.17 sq mi)

Population (31.12.2013)
  - Total: 8,226
  - Density: 2,720/km^{2} (7,050/sq mi)

Ülejõe (Estonian for 'across the river') is a neighbourhood of Tartu, Estonia. It has a population of 8,226 (as of 31 December 2013) and an area of 3.02 km^{2} (1.17 mi^{2}).

Ülejõe lies across the Emajõgi from Tartu's city center, featuring Ülejõe Park alongside the river. Its most prominent site is the University of Tartu's Delta Center for Computer Science alongside other buildings of the University of Tartu.

The northern part of Ülejõe was formerly called Kvissental (:et).

== See also ==
- University of Tartu Sports Hall
- University of Tartu Stadium (:et)
- Raudsild
