= Stone Bridge (Tartu) =

Bridge in Tartu, Estonia

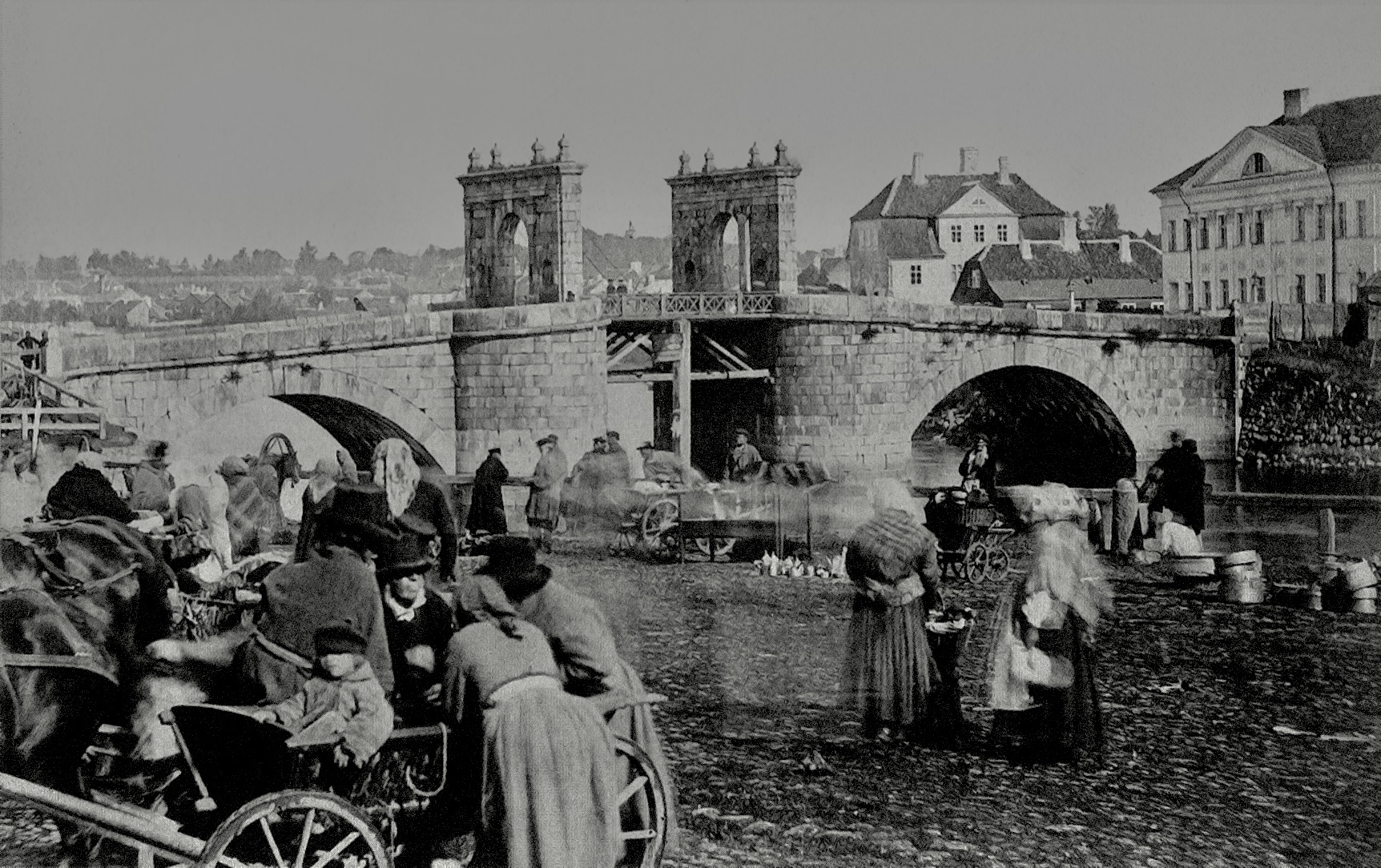
- Stone Bridge in 1880.
- Coordinates: 58°22′51″N 26°43′33″E
- Crossed: Emajõgi
- Locale: Tartu

History
- Opened: September 1784, 16; 241 years ago
- Destroyed: 1941; 85 years ago

Location
- Interactive map of Stone Bridge

Stone Bridge (Estonian: Kivisild) was a bridge in Tartu, Estonia.

The bridge was opened on 16 September 1784. The bridge was built on the orders of Empress Catherine II of Russia.

The bridge was destroyed during WWII in 1941. Today, Kaarsild stands where the bridge used to be.

There are plans to restore the bridge to its original glory.
