= Kuradisild =

Bridge in Tartu, Estonia

Coordinates: 58.3789°N 26.7159°E

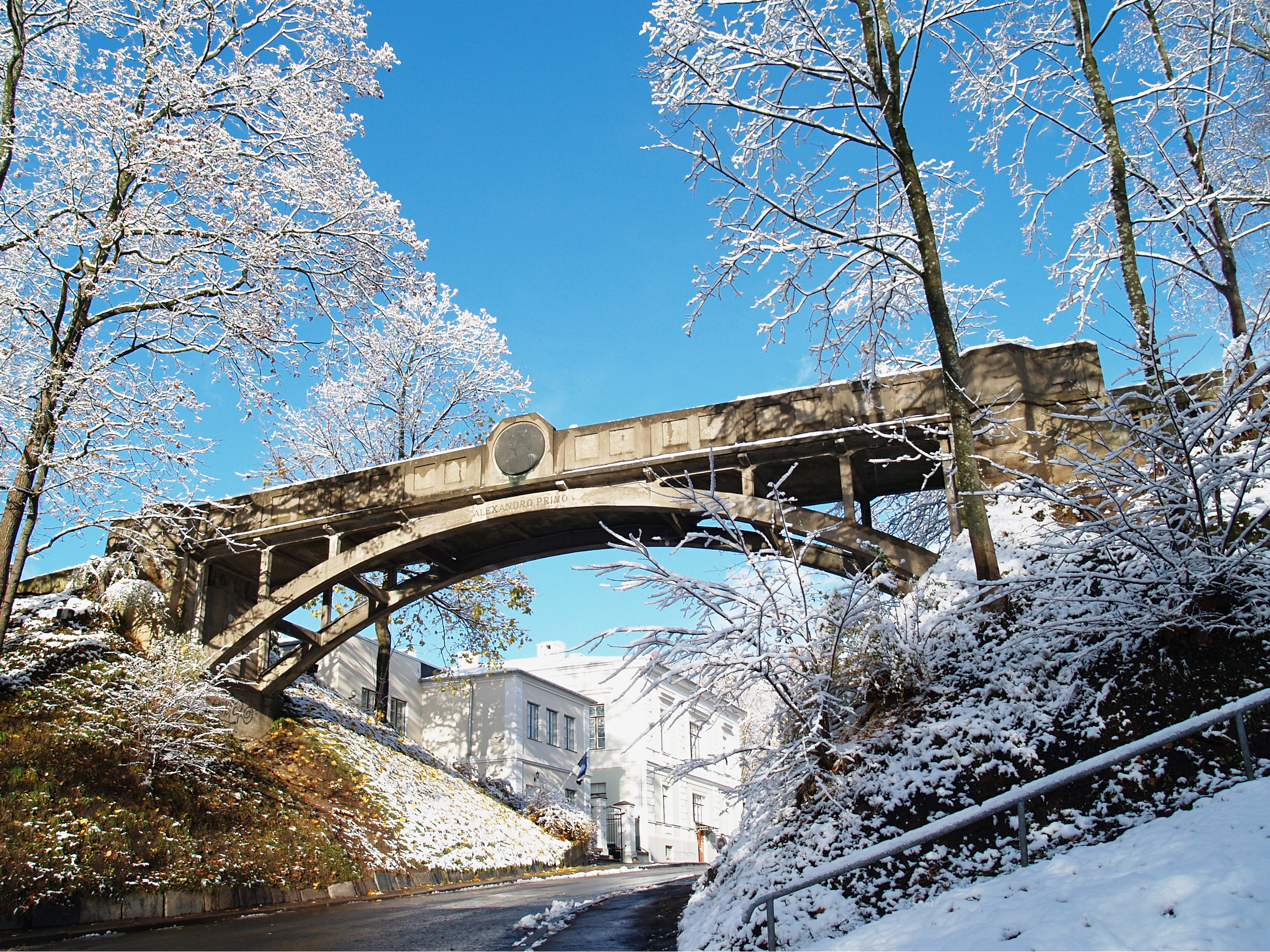
Kuradisild in winter

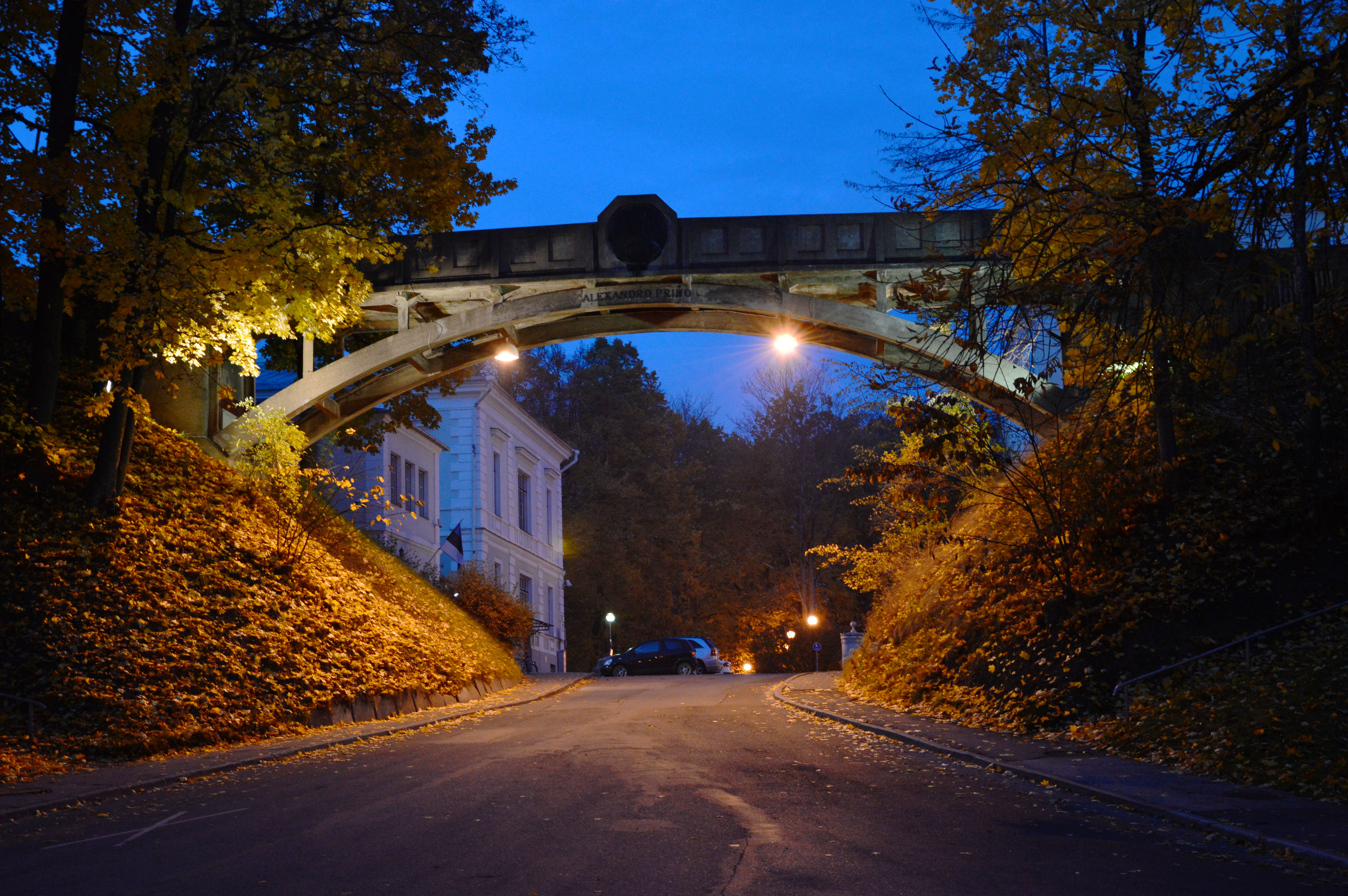
Kuradisild at night

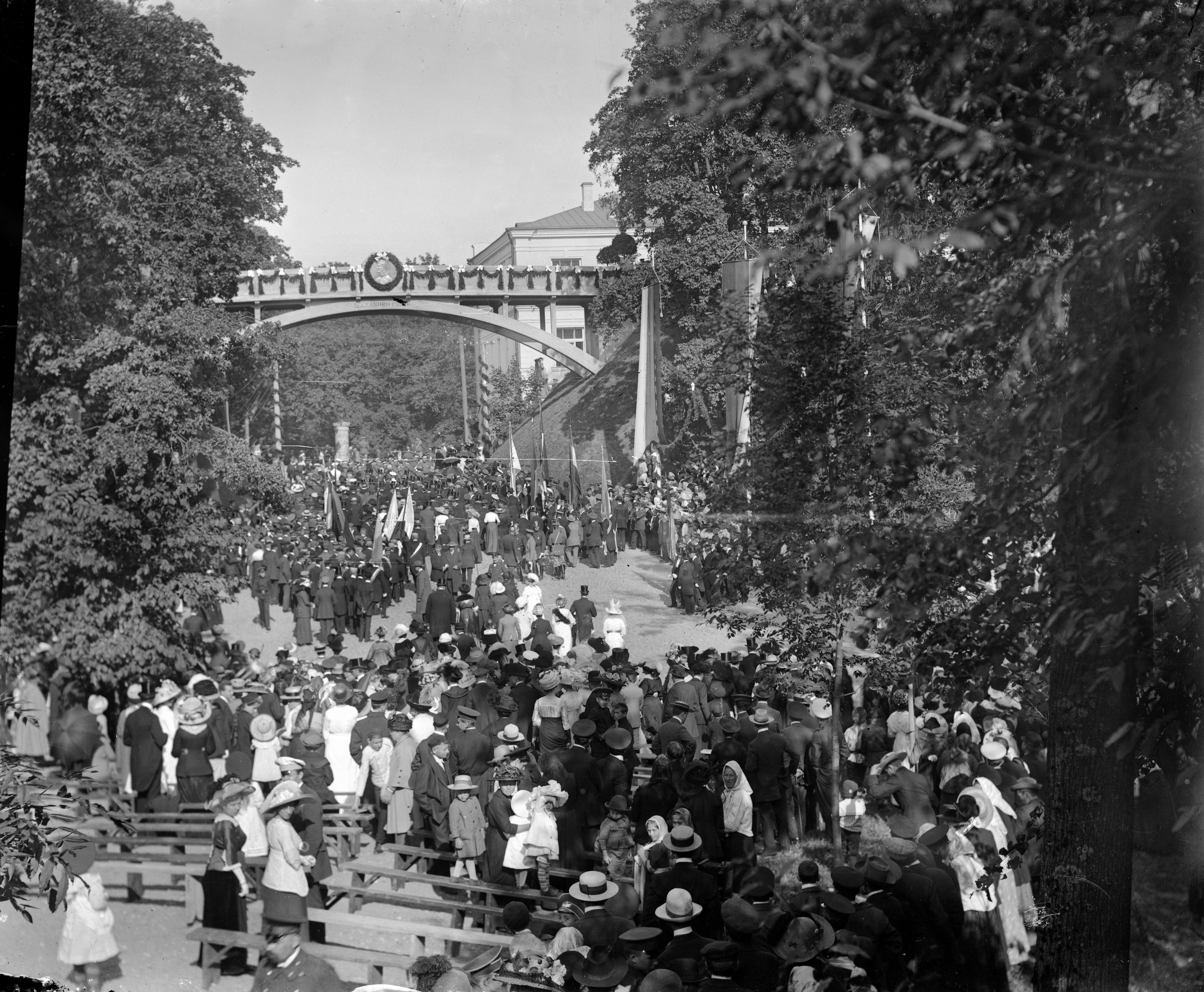
The opening ceremony of the bridge (1913)

Flying from Kuradisild to Inglisild (Angel's Bridge)

Kuradisild (Estonian "The Devil's Bridge"; originally Aleksandri sild, "Alexander's Bridge") is a dark concrete footbridge located on the Toomemägi hill in Tartu, Estonia, built to commemorate the Tercentenary of the then ruling Romanov dynasty in 1913, at the time when Estonia was part of the Russian Empire.

Kuradisild is one of the few remaining concrete bridges built in early 20th century. It is one of the symbols and landmarks of Tartu alongside Inglisild ("Angel's Bridge") located on the other side of Toomemägi hill. The bridge is supported by two arches. Its massive parapet is decorated with ornamental panels and seating recesses.

The first bridge located in the place of modern-day Kuradisild was built in 1809. The Neogothic wooden bridge was based on designs by the University of Tartu architect Johann Wilhelm Krause. This bridge was later replaced by a single span wooden bridge designed by Johann Gottlieb Köningsmann and built in 1842–1844. The current single span concrete bridge was built to commemorate the 300th anniversary of the ruling Romanov dynasty after designs made by Tartu city architect Arved Eichhorn. The uphill (Toomemägi) side of the bridge is decorated with the numbers 1613 and 1913, commemorating the jubilee; the downhill side of the bridge bears a bronze relief of Emperor Alexander I of Russia (made by Constanze von Wetter-Rosenthal) and the emperor's name Alexandro Primo (in Latin).

The bridge is a protected heritage site.

== Origin of the name ==
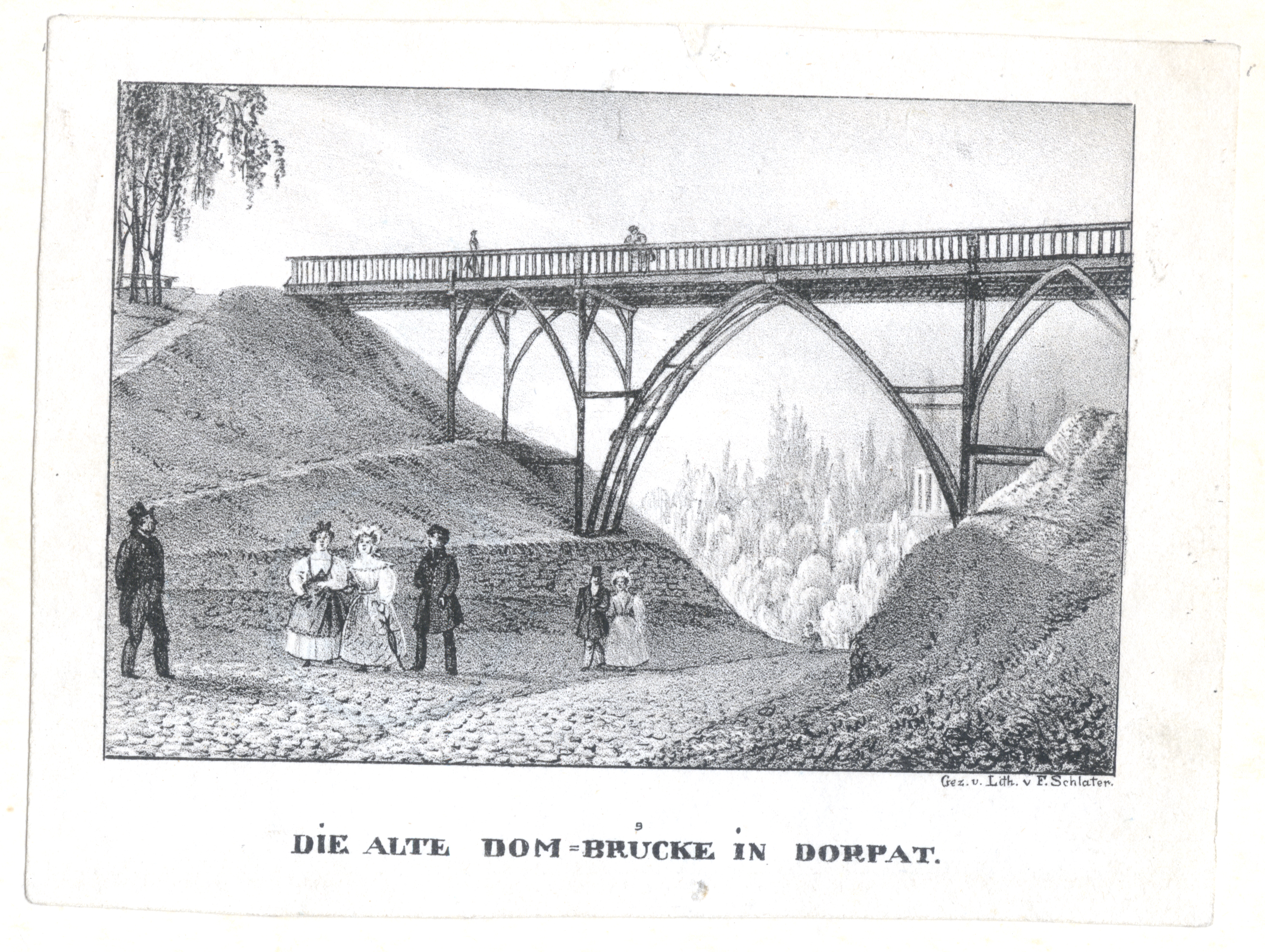
The first wooden bridge at the location of Kuradisild (lithography by Georg Friedrich Schlater, 1830)

The origin of the name of the Devil's Bridge is unclear. The name may have derived from the dark color of the bridge which stands in sharp contrast with the nearby, much lighter, Angel's Bridge. It has also been suggested that the name may have originated from the name of the supervisor of the construction of the bridge, professor of medicine and surgeon Werner Zoege von Manteuffel (Teufel – German for "Devil"), or, alternatively, from its similarity to the Teufelsbrücke bridge on the Reuss river in Switzerland.

== See also ==
- Inglisild (Angel's Bridge)
