= Inglisild =

Bridge in Tartu, Estonia

Coordinates: 58°22′47″N 26°43′03″E

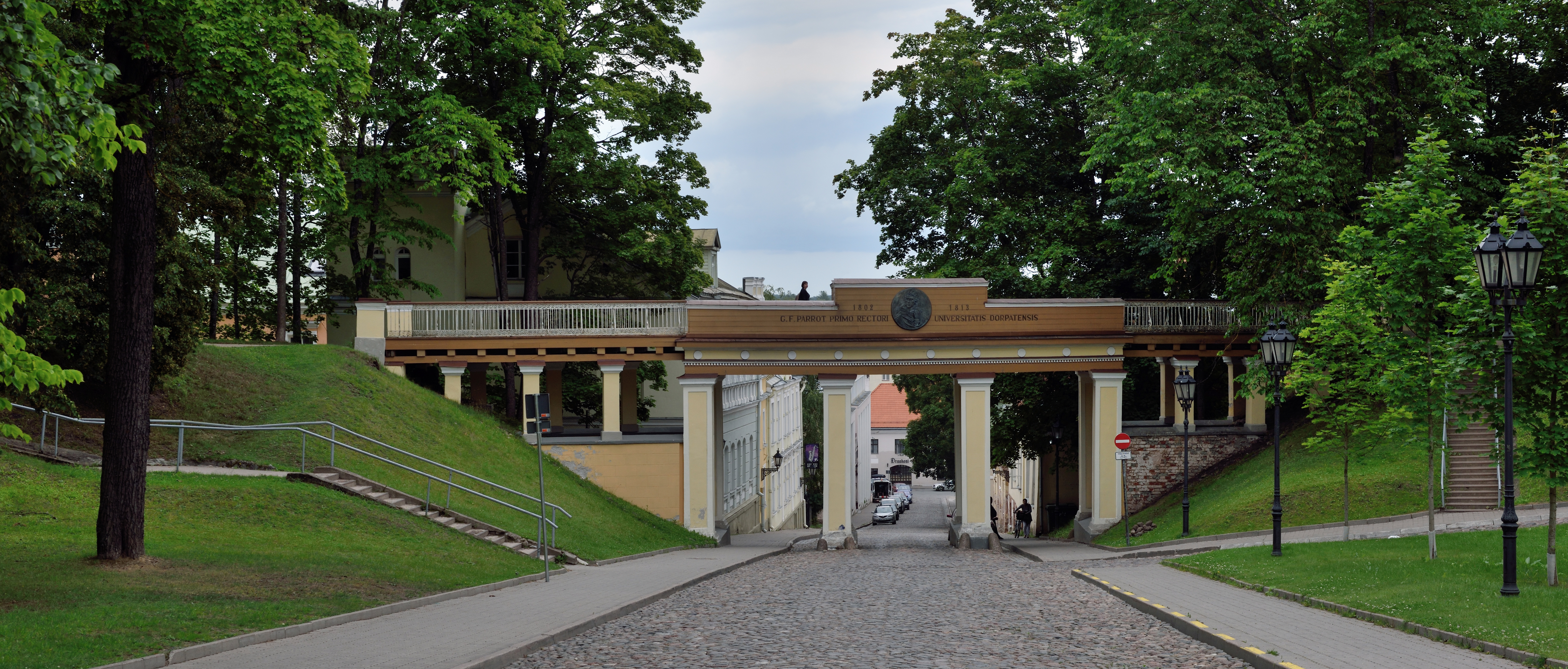
Inglisild in 2015

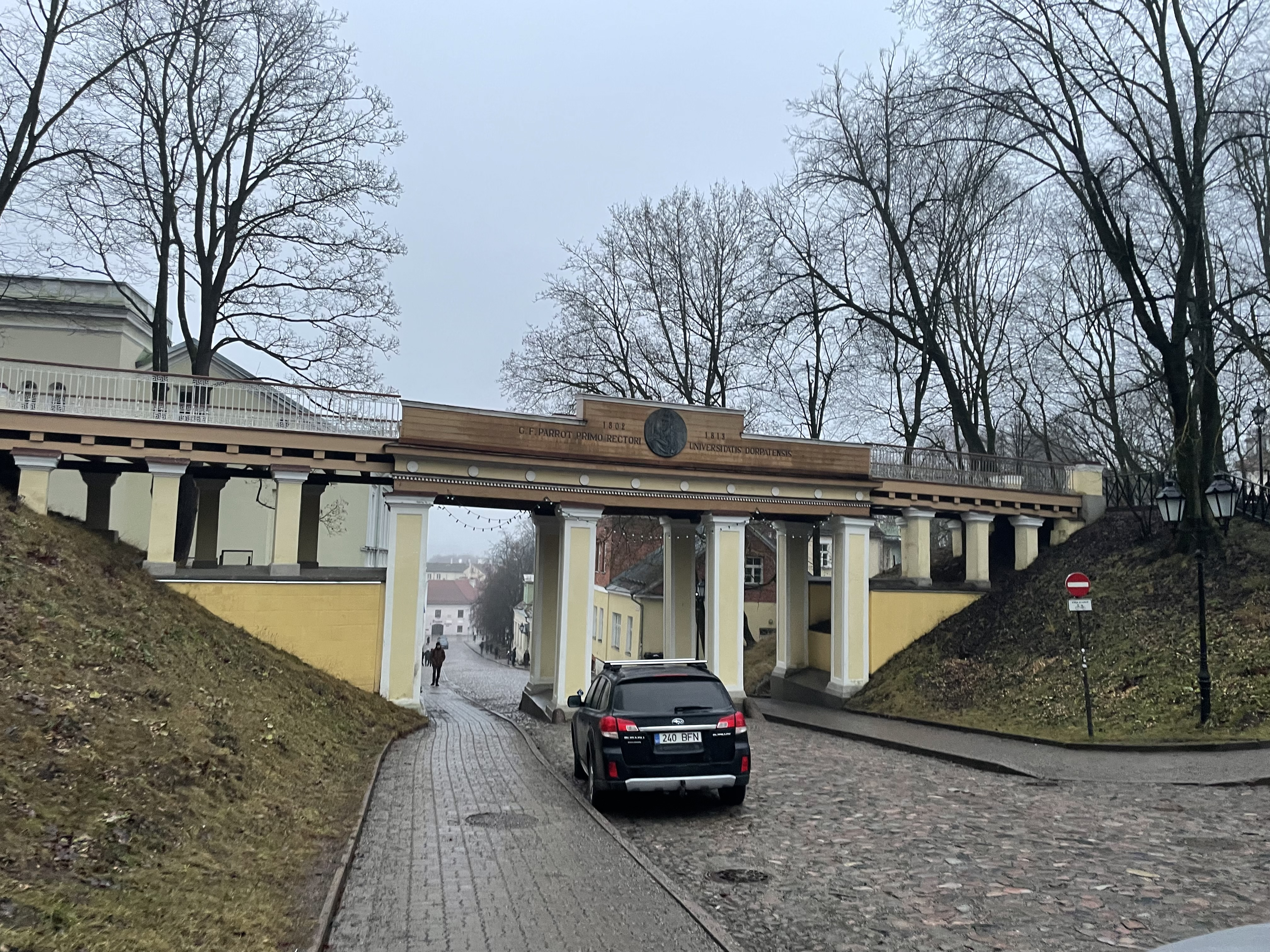
Inglisild in 2025

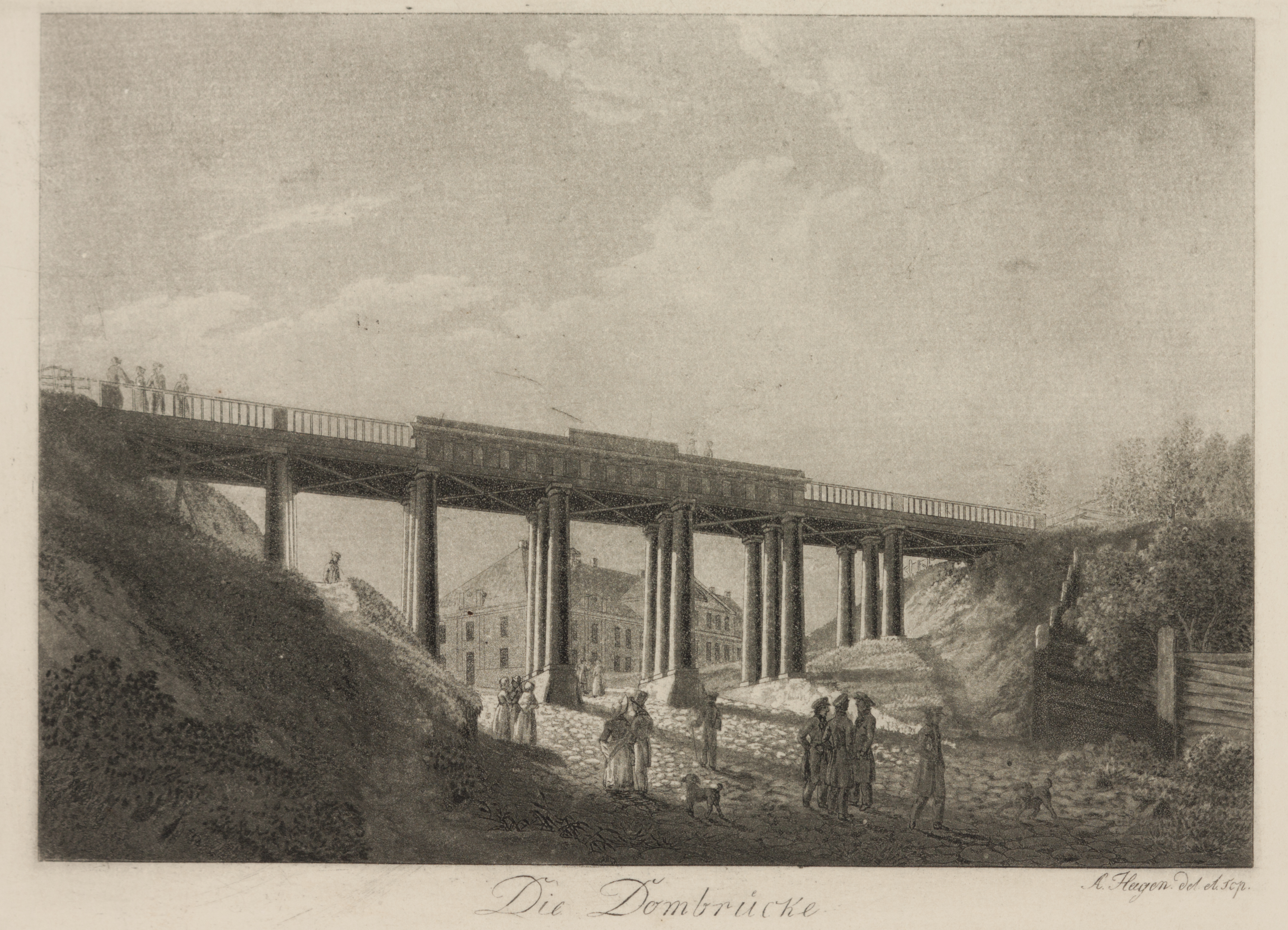
The old Dombrücke in 1827–1828 (by August Matthias Hagen)

Flight from Kuradisild (Devil's Bridge) to Inglisild

Inglisild (Estonian "Angel's Bridge"; originally Toomesild, German Dombrücke, "The Cathedral Bridge") is a bridge located on the Toomemägi hill in Tartu, Estonia.

The original wooden footbridge was built on the site in 1814–1816, designed by Johann Wilhelm Krause. A partially re-designed and enlarged version of the bridge was completed in 1836. The rebuilt structure was designed by Moritz Hermann von Jacobi.

The portrait relief in the middle of the bridge commemorates Georg Friedrich Parrot (1767–1852, the first rector of University of Tartu after the university reopened in 1802) and bears the inscription Otium reficit vires (Latin 'Leisure Renews the Powers').

In 2012, several wooden structures of the bridge sustained damage in a fire set by arsonists. The bridge was soon repaired and has remained open to the public to this day.

== See also ==
- Kuradisild ('The Devil's Bridge')
