= Gunpowder Cellar of Tartu =

Historic building in Tartu, Estonia

Coordinates: 58.379154°N 26.718975°E

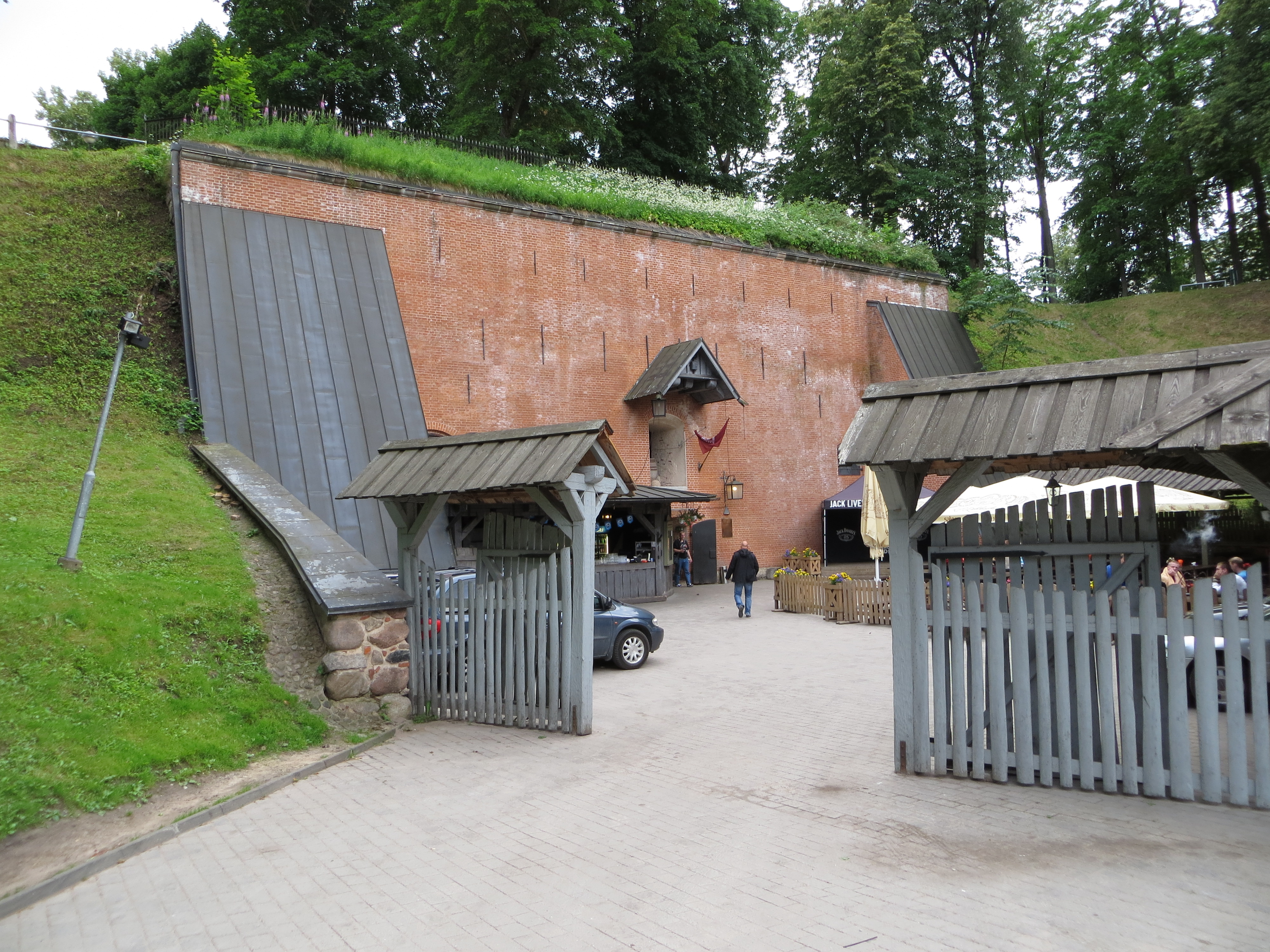
Entrance

The Gunpowder Cellar (Estonian: Püssirohukelder) is a historic building in Tartu, Estonia which now functions as a beer restaurant.

The name is derived from the restaurant's location: it is situated in an 18th-century gunpowder cellar constructed in 1768–1778 by order of Catherine II of Russia on the site of an earlier fort, making use of the natural valley and pre-existing very thick brick walls for added safety. The building served as a gunpowder cellar until 1809 when it was converted to a beer storage room. At the end of the 19th century the building began to be used by the University of Tartu which meant that lectures and scientific work were often conducted on top of gunpowder barrels. In the 1990s it functioned as a large medieval restaurant before reopening in 2001 as a pub and disco though retaining a wine cellar.

Its unique structure also lends it a unique distinction: it is in the Guinness Book of World Records for having the highest pub ceiling in the world, at 11 metres (36 ft).

The restaurant is a popular meeting place among Tartu's student population. It boasts a regular cultural programme, including a number of plays by the Vanemuine theatre. This programme includes regular live music events.

== Gallery ==
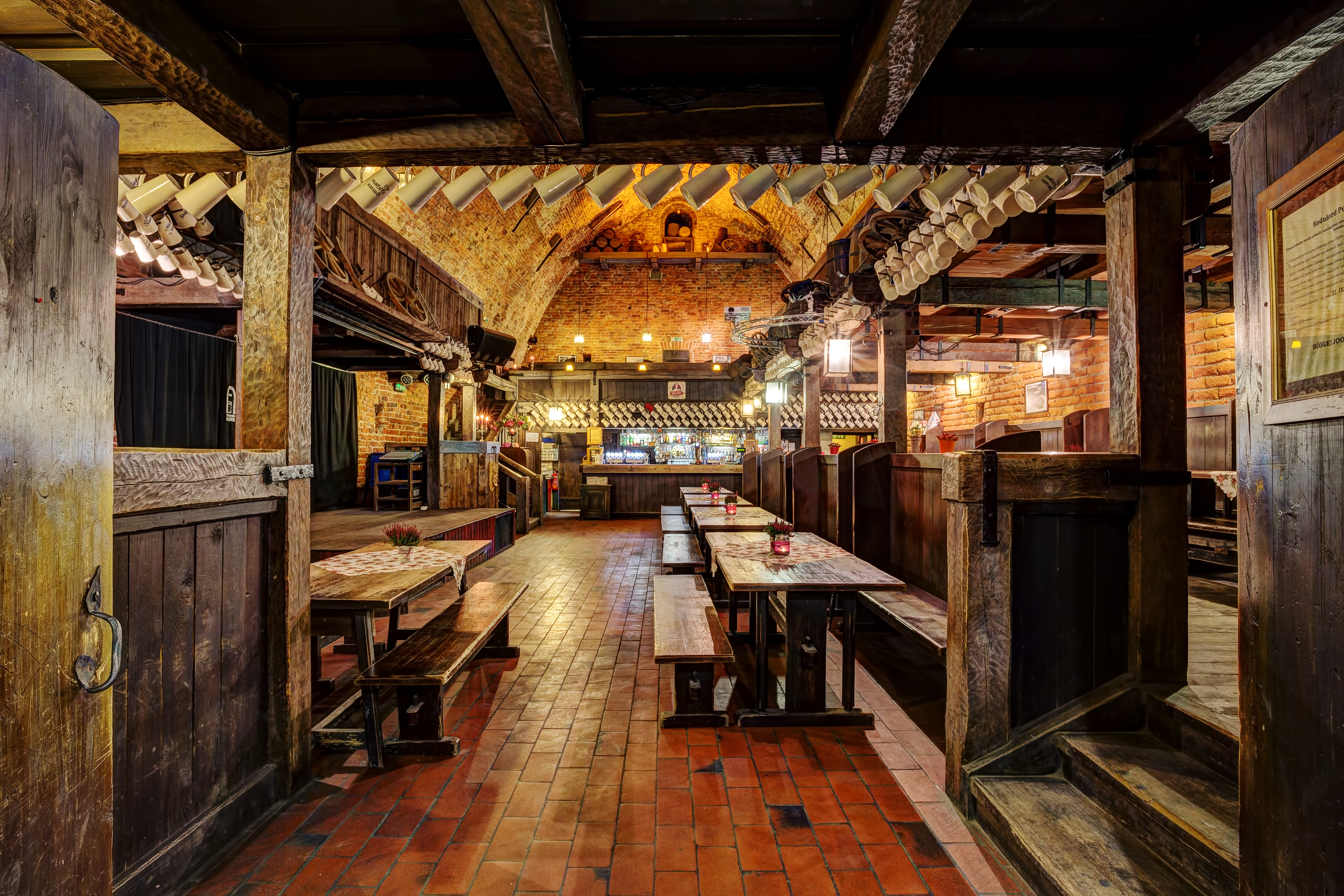

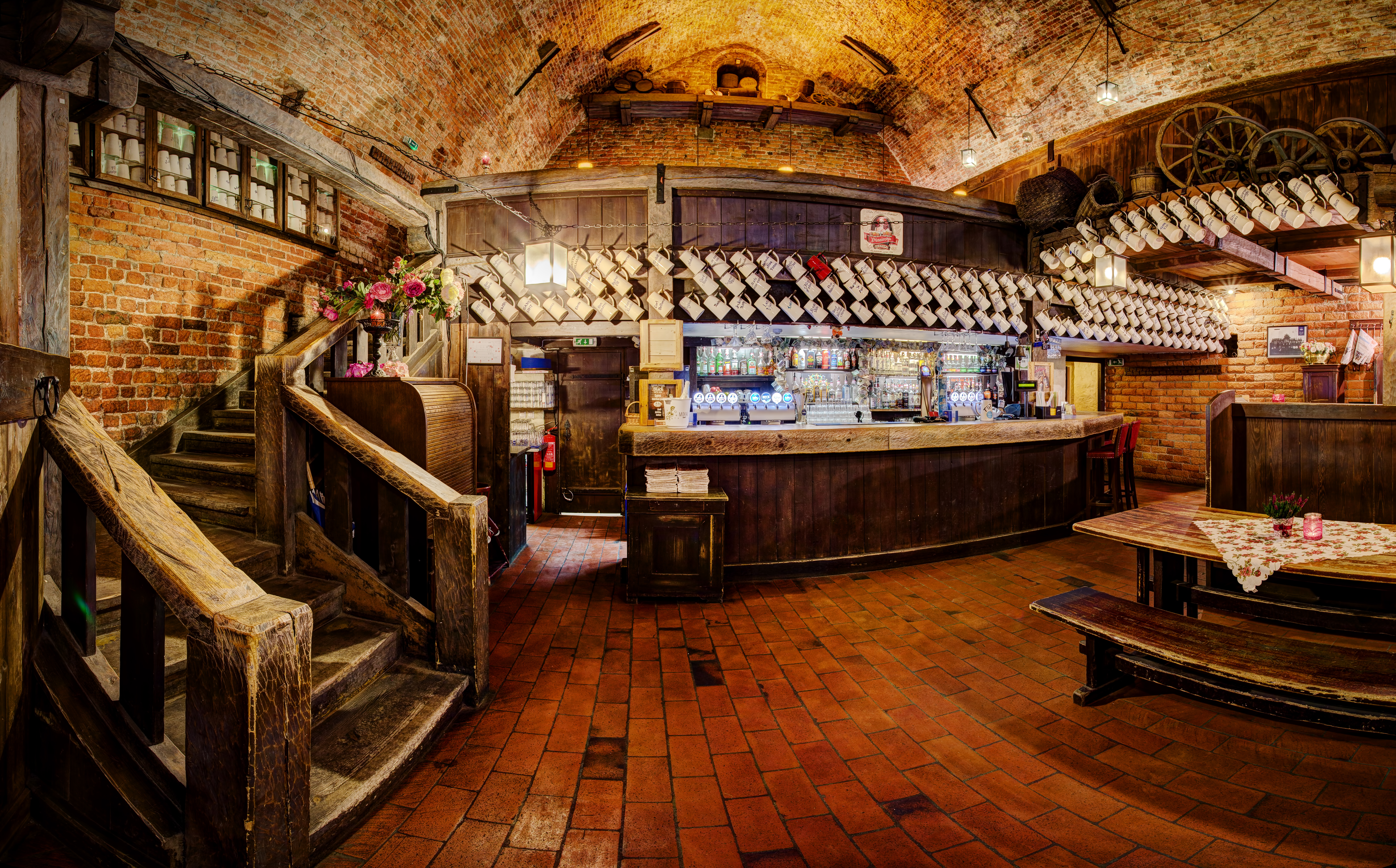

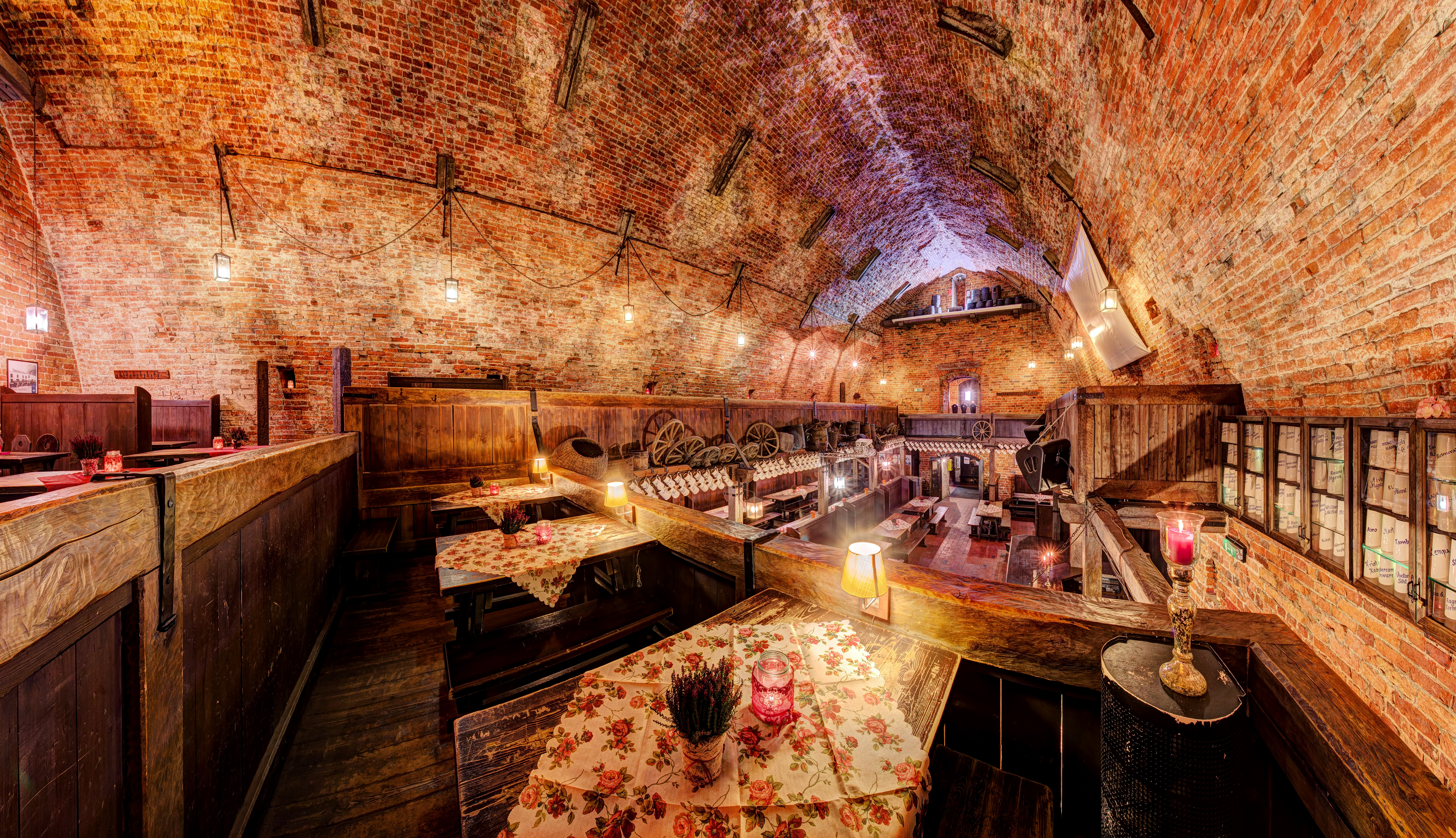
