= List of museums in Estonia =

This is a list of museums (including art museums or art galleries) in Estonia.

| Name | Image | Type | Summary | County | Municipality | Location | URL |
|---|---|---|---|---|---|---|---|
| A-Gallery | | Art | | Harju | Tallinn | endriku 15a | Tallinn |
| AHHAA | | Science | Introduction of science. | Tartu | Tartu | Sadama 1; 58°22′35.87″N 26°44′4.59″E | |
| Art Museum of Estonia: Adamson-Eric Museum | | Art | Personal museum of artist Adamson-Eric. | Harju | Tallinn | Lühike jalg 3; 59°26′10.73″N 24°44′30.91″E | |
| Art Museum of Estonia: Kadriorg Art Museum | | Art | Western European and Russian art from 16th to 19th centuries. Located at Kadriorg Palace. | Harju | Tallinn | A. Weizenbergi 37; 59°26′18.65″N 24°47′27.5″E | |
| Art Museum of Estonia: Kumu | | Art | Estonian art from the 18th century to the present day. | Harju | Tallinn | A. Weizenbergi 34; 59°26′11.64″N 24°47′48.12″E | |
| Art Museum of Estonia: Mikkel Museum | | Art | European and Oriental art from Johannes Mikkel's private collection. | Harju | Tallinn | A. Weizenbergi 28; 59°26′14.93″N 24°47′28.79″E | |
| Art Museum of Estonia: Niguliste Museum | | Art | Ecclesiastical art dating back to the Middle Ages. Located at the St. Nicholas' Church. | Harju | Tallinn | Niguliste 3; 59°26′9.31″N 24°44′33.71″E | |
| Art Museum of Estonia: Kristjan Raud House Museum (et) | | Biographical | Located in a house where artist Kristjan Raud lived between 1929 and 1943. Exposes his artwork (drawings, drafts, etudes), also hs studio. | Harju | Tallinn | K. Raua 8; 59°23′22.31″N 24°41′30.84″E | |
| Baer Museum | | Biographical | House museum dedicated to scientist Karl Ernst von Baer. Established in 1976. Part of the Estonian University of Life Sciences. | Tartu | Tartu | | |
| Banned Books Museum | | History | Museum dedicated to the collection, preservation, and exhibition of books that have been banned or censored around the world. | Harju | Tallinn | Munga 2; 59°26′17″N 24°44′53″E | |
| Betti Alver Museum (et) | | Biographical | House museum dedicated to poet Betti Alver. | Jõgeva | Jõgeva | Jaama 3 B 58°44′48.12″N 26°24′03.96″E | |
| Car Museum | | | Before 2016, the museum was located in Tallinn (Tallinn Car Museum) | Pärnu | Halinga | | |
| Chocolala Chocolate Museum | Suur-Karja 20, Tallinn, Estonia | History | History of Estonian chocolate industry since 1806 | Harju | Tallinn | Suur-Karja 20; 59°26′5.18″N 24°44′48.88″E | |
| Dominican Monastery Museum | | Historic Site | Former monastery | Harju | Tallinn | Müürivahe 33; 59°26′16.38″N 24°44′57.04″E | |
| Draakon Gallery | | | Art gallery | Harju | Tallinn | Pikk Street 18 | |
| Estonian Agricultural Museum | | | | Tartu | | | |
| Estonian Aviation Museum | | Aviation | Aircraft, helicopters and gliders, aircraft models, air defence systems etc. | Tartu | Lange | Veskiorg 1, Lange; 58°36′13.87″N 27°7′47.49″E | |
| Estonian Broadcasting Museum (et) | | History | History of Estonian broadcasting in television and radio. | Järva | Türi | Vabriku puiestee 11; 58°48′14″N 25°25′46″E | |
| Estonian Dairy Museum (et) | | History | History of the dairy industry in Estonia. | Järva | Imavere | Hans Rebase tee 1; 58°44′0″N 25°45′59″E | |
| Estonian Flag Museum (et) | | History | History of the Estonian flag. | Valga County | Otepää | Kirikumõis 67406; 58°3′40″N 26°29′56″E | |
| Estonian Health Museum (et) | | Medicine | Collection of items related to the history of medicine in Estonia. | Harju | Tallinn | Lai 30; 59°26′22.6″N 24°44′43.94″E | |
| Estonian History Museum: Great Guild Hall | | History | Museum of Estonian history | Harju | Tallinn | Pikk 17; 59°26′18.26″N 24°44′42.05″E | |
| Estonian History Museum: Maarjamäe Palace | | History | Museum of Estonian history. | Harju | Tallinn | Pirita tee 56; 59°27′8.93″N 24°48′36.9″E | |
| Estonian History Museum: Estonian Film Museum (et) | | Cultural | Museum dedicated to the Cinema of Estonia. | Harju | Tallinn | Pirita tee 56; 59°27′8.93″N 24°48′36.9″E | |
| Estonian Jewish Museum (et) | | Cultural | Dedicated to the history and culture of Jews in Estonia. | Harju | Tallinn | Karu 16; 59°26′18.85″N 24°45′58.85″E | |
| Estonian Literary Museum | | Cultural | Museum of Estonian literature and folklore. | Tartu | Tartu | Vanemuise 42; 58°22′26.23″N 26°43′4.26″E | |
| Estonian Maritime Museum: Fat Margaret | | Maritime | Museum about history of ships and navigation in Estonia. | Harju | Tallinn | Pikk 70; 59°26′33.12″N 24°44′58.6″E | |
| Estonian Maritime Museum: Seaplane Harbour | | Maritime | Exhibition of museum ships: EML Kalev, EML Lembit, Suur Tõll and others. | Harju | Tallinn | Vesilennuki 6; 59°27′6.18″N 24°44′18.74″E | |
| Estonian Museum of Applied Art and Design | | Art | Exposition on the history of Estonian applied art. | Harju | Tallinn | Lai 17; 59°26′23.08″N 24°44′42.23″E | |
| Estonian National Museum | | Cultural | Museum of the cultural history of Estonia. | Tartu | Tartu | Muuseumi tee 2 | |
| Estonian National Museum: Heimtali Museum | | Cultural | Museum of the domestic life of Estonia. Located at old Heimtali village schoolhouse. | Viljandi | Heimtali | Heimtali; 58°19′35.9″N 25°28′49.62″E | |
| Estonian National Museum: Estonian Postal Museum | | | | | | | |
| Estonian Museum of Natural History | | Natural | Geological, botanical and zoological collections and exhibitions. | Harju | Tallinn | Lai 29A; 59°26′26.45″N 24°44′44.77″E | |
| Estonian Open Air Museum | | Cultural | Reconstruction of 18th-century Estonian countryside and village life. | Harju | Tallinn | Vabaõhumuuseumi tee 12; 59°25′53.53″N 24°38′16.99″E | |
| Estonian Police Museum (et) | | Cultural | Museum dedicated to the history of the Estonian Police (Eesti Politsei) | Lääne-Viru | Rakvere | Tallinna tänav 3A; 59°21′02.14″N 26°21′13″E | |
| Estonian Railway Museum at Lavassaare | | Railway | History of narrow-track railway in Estonia | Pärnu | Lavassaare | Ülejõe 1; 58°31′14″N 24°2′13″E | |
| Estonian Road Museum | | History | Automotive and road history in Estonia | Põlva | Varbuse | Varbuse 63122; 58°01′35″N 26°54′40″E | |
| Estonian Sports and Olympic Museum | | Sport | Museum of the history of Estonian sport. | Tartu | Tartu | Rüütli 15; 58°22′56.83″N 26°43′17.21″E | |
| Estonian Sports Museum: Otepää Winter Sports Museum (et) | | Sport | Museum of the history of winter sports in Estonia. | Valga | Nüpli | Valga mnt 12 Otepää; 58°3′12.28″N 26°30′6.84″E | |
| Estonian Theatre and Music Museum | | Cultural | Museum collects, preserves, studies and introduces the Estonian theatre and musicale life. | Harju | Tallinn | Müürivahe 12; 59°26′5.33″N 24°44′42.78″E | |
| Estonian Theatre and Music Museum: Andres Särev Museum (et) | | Biographical | An apartment-museum of theatre director and actor Andres Särev. | Harju | Tallinn | Tina 23; 59°26′10.55″N 24°46′24.21″E | |
| Estonian War Museum | | History | Dedicated to military history of Estonia | Harju | Viimsi | Mõisa tee 1; 59°30′05″N 24°50′04″E | |
| Fotografiska Tallinn | Exterior of Fotografiska Tallinn | Photography | Museum featuring works from international and local Estonian photographers. | Harju | Tallinn | Telliskivi 60a-8 59°26′17.934″N 24°43′41.67″E | |
| Museum of Fight for Estonia's Freedom | | Military | Private museum specialised on exhibits of World War II battles on Estonian soil. | Harju | Lagedi | Muuseumi tee 6, Lagedi; 59°23′19.84″N 24°56′27.71″E | |
| Haapsalu and Läänemaa Museums: Haapsalu Castle | | Historic Site | Historical Haapsalu Episcopal Castle. | Lääne | Haapsalu | Lossiplats 3; 58°56′50.77″N 23°32′19.71″E | |
| Haapsalu and Läänemaa Museums: Railway and Communications Museum | | Railway | Estonian railway history | Lääne | Haapsalu | Raudtee 2, Haapsalu; 58°56′19.03″N 23°31′55.54″E | |
| Haapsalu City Gallery | | Art | | | Haapsalu | | |
| Hanila Museum | | Cultural | Regional museum in western Estonia. | Pärnu | Lääneranna Parish | Hanila; 58°36′50.1″N 23°36′10.6″E | |
| Harju County Museum | | | Exhibits the life of Harju County throughout history. | Harju | Keila | Linnuse Street 9 | |
| Haus Gallery | | Art | | Tallinn | Tallinn | | |
| Hiiu County Museum | | | | Hiiu | | | |
| Hiiu County Museum: Rudolf Tobias Museum | | | Dedicated to Rudolf Tobias | Hiiu | | | |
| Ice Age Centre | | Geology | Museum dedicated to the understanding of ice ages. | Tartu | Äksi | Saadjärve 20; 58°31′33.61″N 26°40′34.32″E | |
| Iisaku Museum | | | | | | | |
| Instrument Museum (et) | | Cultural | | Tartu | Rõngu | Valga mnt 1; 58°08′31″N 26°14′47″E | |
| Carl Robert Jakobson Farm Museum (et) | | Biographical | | Pärnu | Vändra Parish | Kurgja-Linnutaja | |
| Järva County Museum | | | | | | | |
| Kalame Farm Museum | | | part of Virumaa Museums | Karepa | Haljala Parish | | |
| Kapp Family Home Museum | | | | Viljandi | Suure-Jaani | | |
| Karilatsi Open Air Museum | | | | Põlva | Karilatsi | | |
| Kehra Museum | | | Opened 2018 | Kehra | Anija Parish | | |
| Kihnu Museum | | | Opened 1974 | Pärnu | Kihnu Parish | | |
| Kreutzwald Memorial Museum | | Biographical | Dedicated to Friedrich Reinhold Kreutzwald | Võru | Võru | | |
| Küü Gallery | | Art gallery | | Tartu | Tartu | | |
| Lääne County Museum | | | | Lääne | | | |
| Ants Laikmaa Museum | | Art museum/gallery | | Lääne | Lääne-Nigula | Kadarpiku | |
| Liivi Museum | | | | | | | |
| Lühikese Jala Gallery | | Art | | Tallinn | Tallinn | | |
| Mahtra Peasant Museum | | History | | Võru | | | |
| Kalev Marzipan Museum Room | | | | Harju | Tallinn | | |
| Estonian Mining Museum | | History | | Ida-Viru | Kohtla-Nõmme | | |
| Mõniste Peasant Museum | | | | Võru | Rõuge | Kuutsi | |
| Muhu Museum | | | | Saare | | | |
| Muhu Museum: Juhan Smuul Museum | | | | Saare | | | |
| Museum of Estonian Architecture | | Architecture | Development of Estonian architecture through time. Located at an old Rotermann Salt Storage building. | Harju | Tallinn | Ahtri 2; 59°26′25.12″N 24°45′23.13″E | |
| Museum of Coastal Folk | | Cultural | The life of Estonian coastal people in the past and today. | Harju | Viimsi | Nurme tee 3, Pringi; 59°31′16″N 24°48′29″E | |
| Museum of Fight for Estonia's Freedom | | Military History | Privately owned museum specializing in exhibits of World War II battles on Estonian soil, or involving Estonian soldiers. | Harju | Lagedi | Muuseumi tee 2; 59°23′21.12″N 24°56′27.96″E | |
| Museum of New Art, Pärnu | | Art | | | | | |
| Museum of Occupations | | History | Museum dedicated to the period of 1940 to 1991 in Estonian history. | Harju | Tallinn | Toompea 8; 59°25′57.34″N 24°44′21.75″E | |
| Narva Museum (et): Narva Art Gallery (et) | | Art | Painting, sculpture, ornamental and applied art from 17th to 20th century. | Ida-Viru | Narva | Vestervalli 21; 59°22′56.87″N 28°11′47.08″E | |
| Narva Museum (et): Hermann Castle | | Historic Site | Historical Narva Hermann Castle. | Ida-Viru | Narva | Peterburi mnt 2; 59°22′32.21″N 28°12′5.93″E | |
| Nõmme Museum (et) | | History | Dedicated to the history of Nõmme. Located in the former Nõmme railway station building. | Harju | Tallinn | Jaama 18; 59°23′10.68″N 24°41′10.16″E | |
| Palamuse Museum | | History | An overview of the school life of Estonian farmers´ children in the 19th century through the book Kevade (Spring) is displayed in the large exhibition hall of the main building. | Jõgeva | Palamuse | Köstri allee 3 | |
| Pärnu City Gallery | | | | Pärnu | Pärnu | | |
| Pärnu Museum | | History | Dedicated to the history of Pärnu. | Pärnu | Pärnu | Aida 3; 58°38′6″N 24°4′9″E | |
| Pärnu Museum: Lydia Koidula Memorial Museum | | Biographical | Dedicated to poet Lydia Koidula and her father, poet and journalist Johann Voldemar Jannsen. | Pärnu | Pärnu | J. V. Jannseni 37; 58°39′8″N 24°4′8″E | |
| Konstantin Päts Museum (et) | | Biographical | Dedicated to Konstantin Päts, the first President of Estonia. | Harju | Tallinn | Pirita tee 56; 59°27′8.93″N 24°48′36.9″E | |
| Jaan Poska Museum (et) | | Biographical | House museum of diplomat and politician Jaan Poska. | Harju | Tallinn | J. Poska 8; 59°26′3.82″N 24°46′46.56″E | |
| Museum for Puppet Arts (et) | | Cultural | The museum explores history of puppet arts and the Estonian Puppet Theatre. | Harju | Tallinn | Lai 1; 59°26′18.65″N 24°44′35.43″E | |
| Rannarootsi Museum | | | | Lääne | | | |
| Karl Ristikivi Museum | | Biographical | | Tartu | Tartu | | |
| Russian Museum (et) | | Art | Dedicated to the Russian topics related to Estonia. | Harju | Tallinn | Pikk 29A; 59°26′20.11″N 24°44′46.28″E | |
| Saaremaa Museum (et): Johannes and Joosep Aavik's Memorial Museum (et) | | Biographical | House museum of linguist Johannes Aavik and local cultural activist Joosep Aavik | Saare | Kuressaare | Vanalinna 7; 58°15′27.72″N 22°29′3.61″E | |
| Saaremaa Museum (et): Kuressaare Castle | | Historic Site | Historical Kuressaare Episcopal Castle. | Saare | Kuressaare | Lossihoov 1; 58°14′48.86″N 22°28′45.88″E | |
| Saaremaa Museum (et): Mihkli Farm Museum (et) | | Cultural | 19th century local rural village | Saare | Kihelkonna Parish | Viki; 58°20′59.72″N 22°4′49.11″E | |
| Saatse Seto Museum (et) | | Cultural | Part of the larger Seto Museums | Võru | Samarina | Saatse 64037; 57°53′12″N 27°48′5″E | |
| SooSoo Gallery | | | | Harju | Tallinn | Telliskivi 60a | |
| Tallinn City Gallery | | | | Harju | Tallinn | | |
| Tallinn City Museum | | History | Overlook of Tallinn's history through centuries. | Harju | Tallinn | Vene 17; 59°26′19.26″N 24°44′53.37″E | |
| Tallinn City Museum: Children's Museum (et) | | Children | Introduces toys, table games, children's books, postcards etc. | Harju | Tallinn | Kotzebue 16; 59°26′34.23″N 24°44′12.68″E | |
| Tallinn City Museum: St. John the Baptist's Almshouse (et) | | Historic Site | Ruins of historical St. John the Baptist's Almshouse | Harju | Tallinn | Väike-Pääsukese 5; 59°26′0.62″N 24°45′36.92″E | |
| Tallinn City Museum: Kiek in de Kök and Bastion tunnels | | Historic Site | Historical artillery tower Kiek in de Kök and tunnels inside the Ingrian Bastion. | Harju | Tallinn | Komandandi 2; 59°26′4.91″N 24°44′28.88″E | |
| Tallinn City Museum: Miia-Milla-Manda (et) | | Children | Thematical expositions for children between 3 and 11. | Harju | Tallinn | L. Koidula 21C; 59°26′12.35″N 24°47′22.01″E | |
| Tallinn City Museum: Peter I House Museum (et) | | Historic Site | Summer cottage beside Kadriorg Palace, where Peter the Great stayed whyle in Tallinn. | Harju | Tallinn | Mäekalda 2; 59°26′15.43″N 24°47′46.21″E | |
| Tallinn City Museum: Photo Museum (et) | | History | History of Estonian photography. Located at the historical Town Council's Prison. | Harju | Tallinn | Raekoja 4/6; 59°26′12.67″N 24°44′42.98″E | |
| Tallinn City Museum: A. H. Tammsaare Museum (et) | | Biographical | House museum of writer A. H. Tammsaare | Harju | Tallinn | L. Koidula 12A; 59°26′16.21″N 24°46′42.77″E | |
| Tallinn City Museum: A. H. Tammsaare Museum (et); Deco Gallery | | | Art museum. Opened in 1988. Closed in 1998. Re-opened in 2001. | | Tallinn | | |
| Tallinn City Museum: Eduard Vilde Museum (et) | | Biographical | House museum of writer Eduard Vilde. | Harju | Tallinn | Roheline Aas 3; 59°26′11.48″N 24°47′6.95″E | |
| Tallinn City Museum: Eduard Vilde Museum; * Castellan House Gallery | | | art gallery | | | | |
| Tallinn Legends | Entrance to Tallinn Legends | History, Folklore | Features Tallinn's medieval history and legends. | Harju | Tallinn | Kullassepa 7 | |
| A. H. Tammsaare Muuseum | | | Dedicated to A. H. Tammsaare | Harju | Tallinn | | |
| Tartu Art Museum | | Art | Estonian and foreign art | Tartu | Tartu | Raekoja plats 18 | |
| Tartu Art Museum: Anton Starkopf Museum | | Art | | Tartu | Tartu | | |
| Tartu City Museum | | History | History of Tartu | Tartu | Tartu | Narva mnt 23 | |
| Tartu City Museum: Oskar Luts House Museum | | | | Tartu | Tartu | | |
| Tartu City Museum: KGB Cells Museum | | History | | Tartu | Tartu | | |
| University of Tartu Museum | | | | Tartu | Tartu | | |
| University of Tartu Museum: University of Tartu Art Museum | | | | Tartu | Tartu | | |
| University of Tartu Museum: University of Tartu Natural History Museum | | | | Tartu | Tartu | | |
| University of Tartu Geological Museum | | | | Tartu | Tartu | | |
| Tokko & Arrak Gallery | | | | Harju | Tallinn | Raekoja plats 14 | |
| Tartu Toy Museum | | Children | Toys | Tartu | Tartu | Lutsu 2; 58°22′56.4″N 26°43′5.34″E | |
| TYPA | | History Children | Print and Paper Centre | Tartu | Tartu | Kastani 48f, Tartu | |
| Eduard Tubin Museum | | Biographical | Dedicated to composer Eduard Tubin, located at Alatskivi Castle. | Tartu | Alatskivi Parish | Alatskivi Castle, Alatskivi; 58°36′13.87″N 27°7′47.49″E | |
| Vaal Gallery | | Art gallery | | Harju | Tallinn | | |
| Vabaduse Gallery | | Art gallery | | Harju | Tallinn | Vabaduse Square 6 | |
| Valga Museum | | History | | Valga | Valga | | |
| Viinistu Art Museum | | Art | | Harju | Kuusalu | Viinistu | |
| Eduard Vilde Memorial Museum | | | | Tallinn | Tallinn | | |
| Viljandi Museum | | | | Viljandi | Viljandi | | |
| Võru County Museum | | | | Võru | | | |
| Wiklandia (Iloni Imedemaa) | | | Dedicated to Estonian-Swedish artist and illustrator Ilon Wikland | Lääne | Haapsalu | | |

== See also ==
- List of museums
