= Tartu City Museum =

Museum organisation in Tartu, Estonia

Tartu City History Museums
- Tartu Linnaajaloo Muuseumid
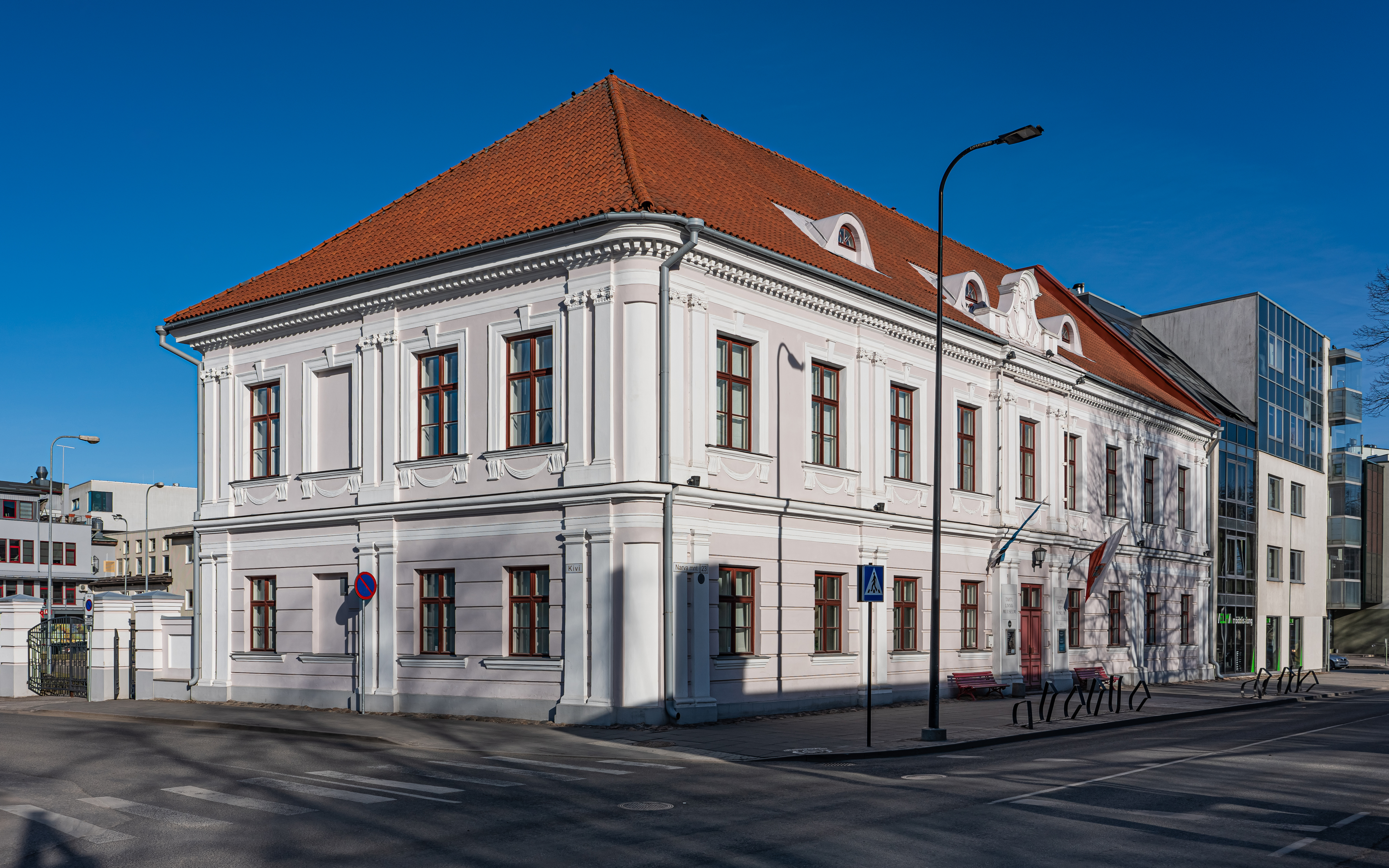
- The Tartu City Museum building, the institution's flagship branch
- Established: 1955; 71 years ago
- Location: Narva mnt 23, Tartu, Estonia
- Coordinates: 58.3820°N 26.7289°E
- Type: History museum
- Director: Risto Lehiste
- Owner: City of Tartu
- Website: muuseum.tartu.ee

Tartu City History Museums (officially Tartu City Museum; Estonian: Tartu Linnaajaloo Muuseumid) is a group of five branch museums administered by the city of Tartu, Estonia. It is financed from the budget of the City of Tartu together with targeted grants applied for by the museum.

The institution's purpose is to document and communicate the diverse history and present-day life of Tartu and to preserve and shape the identity of Tartu as a home city.

It comprises the Tartu City Museum, the Song Festival Museum, the KGB Cells Museum, the Oskar Luts House Museum, and the 19th-century Tartu Citizen's Museum. Although Tartu City Museum remains the institution's official name, the brand name Tartu City History Museums has been used alongside it since August 2020.

== History ==
Tartu City History Museums originated from the Tartu Interdistrict Local History Museum, established in 1955. Its tasks included researching and presenting in exhibitions the history, natural history, industry, agriculture and culture of the city of Tartu and eight surrounding districts: Tartu, Elva, Jõgeva, Kallaste, Mustvee, Otepää, Põlva and Räpina.

Until 2000, the museum was located on the edge of Kassitoome, at Oru 2.

Since its establishment, the institution has been headed by Hilja Kullaste, Lia Essenson-Kevvai, Evy Männik, Aili Suur-Raendi, Heivi Pullerits, Sirje Karis and Merike Toomas. Since 2022, the director has been Risto Lehiste.

== Branch museums ==
The five branch museums are located in different districts of Tartu.

Tartu City Museum is located at Narva mnt 23. It opened at this location on 31 August 2001.

Oskar Luts House Museum is located at Riia 38. It opened on 22 March 1964, eleven years after the death of writer Oskar Luts.

The 19th-century Tartu Citizen's Museum occupies a wooden residential building completed in the 1740s at Jaani Street 16 in central Tartu, arranged as the home of a middle-class citizen in the 1830s. It opened on 7 July 1993.

The Song Festival Museum is located at Jaama Street 14, in the former building of the Vanemuine Society, and covers, among other subjects, traditions initiated by the society. It opened on 19 October 2007.

The KGB Cells Museum is located at Riia 15b, where the Tartu department of the Ministry of State Security of the Estonian SSR operated in the 1940s and 1950s. It opened on 12 October 2001.

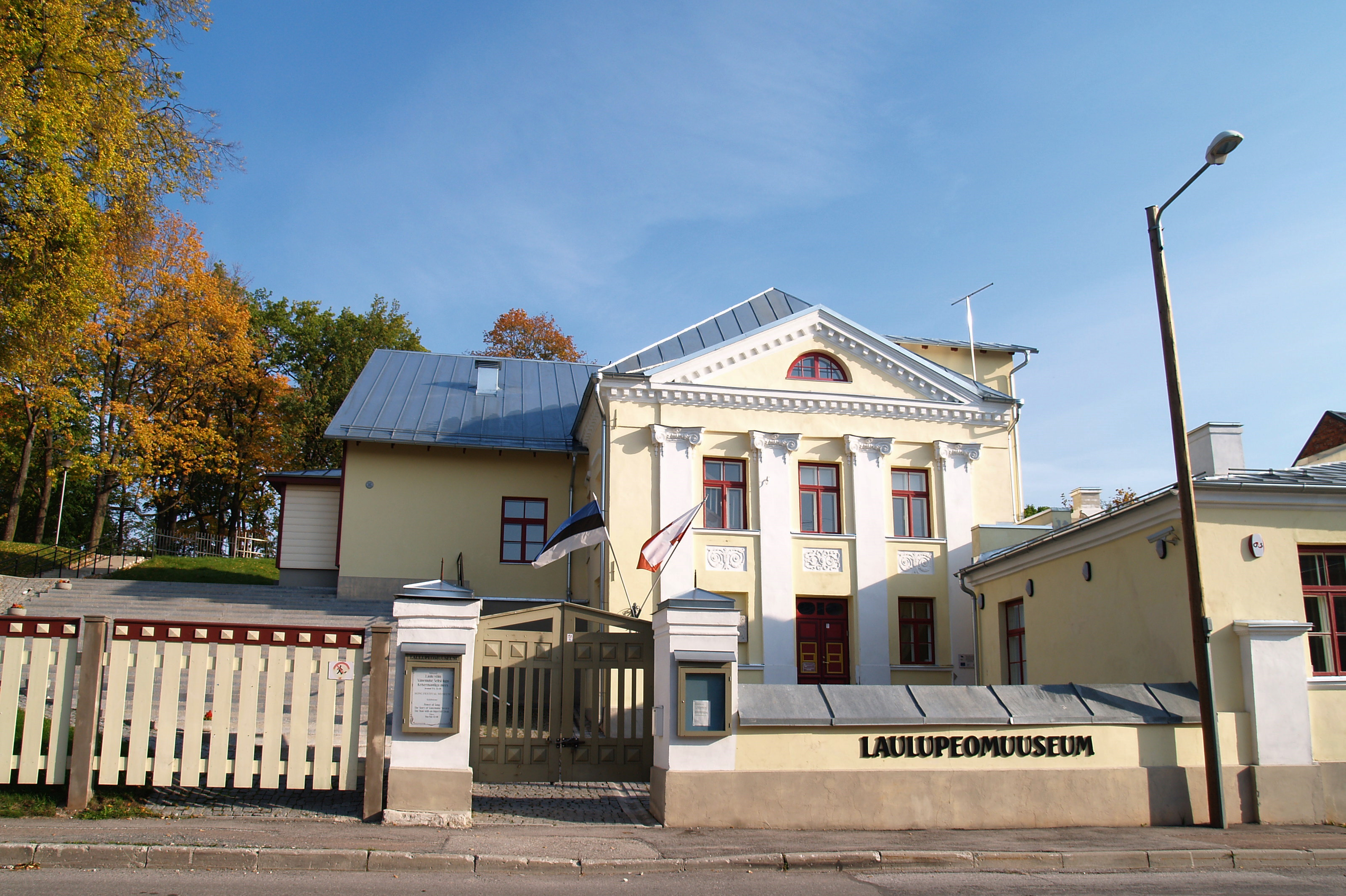
Song Festival Museum

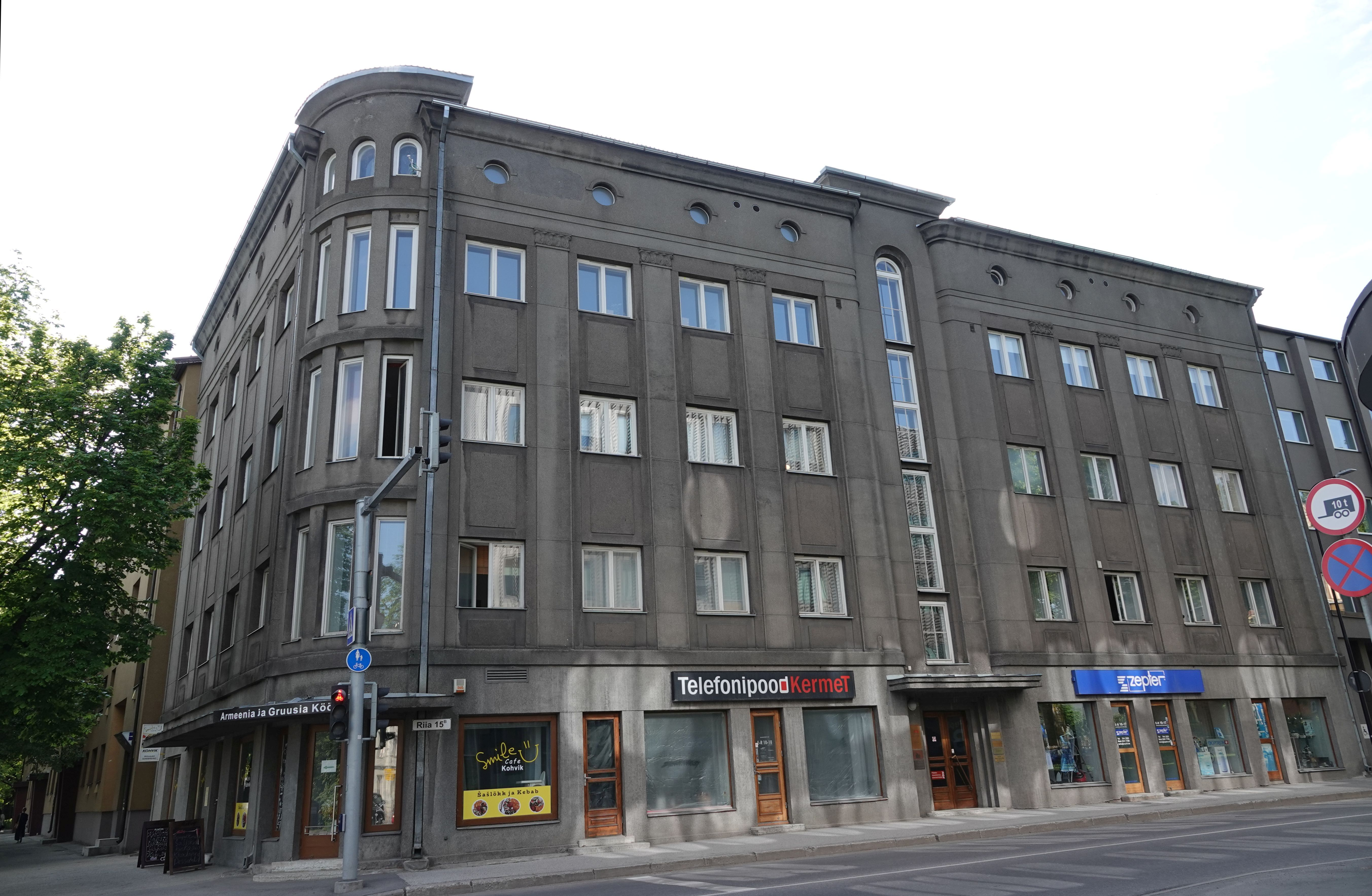
KGB Cells Museum

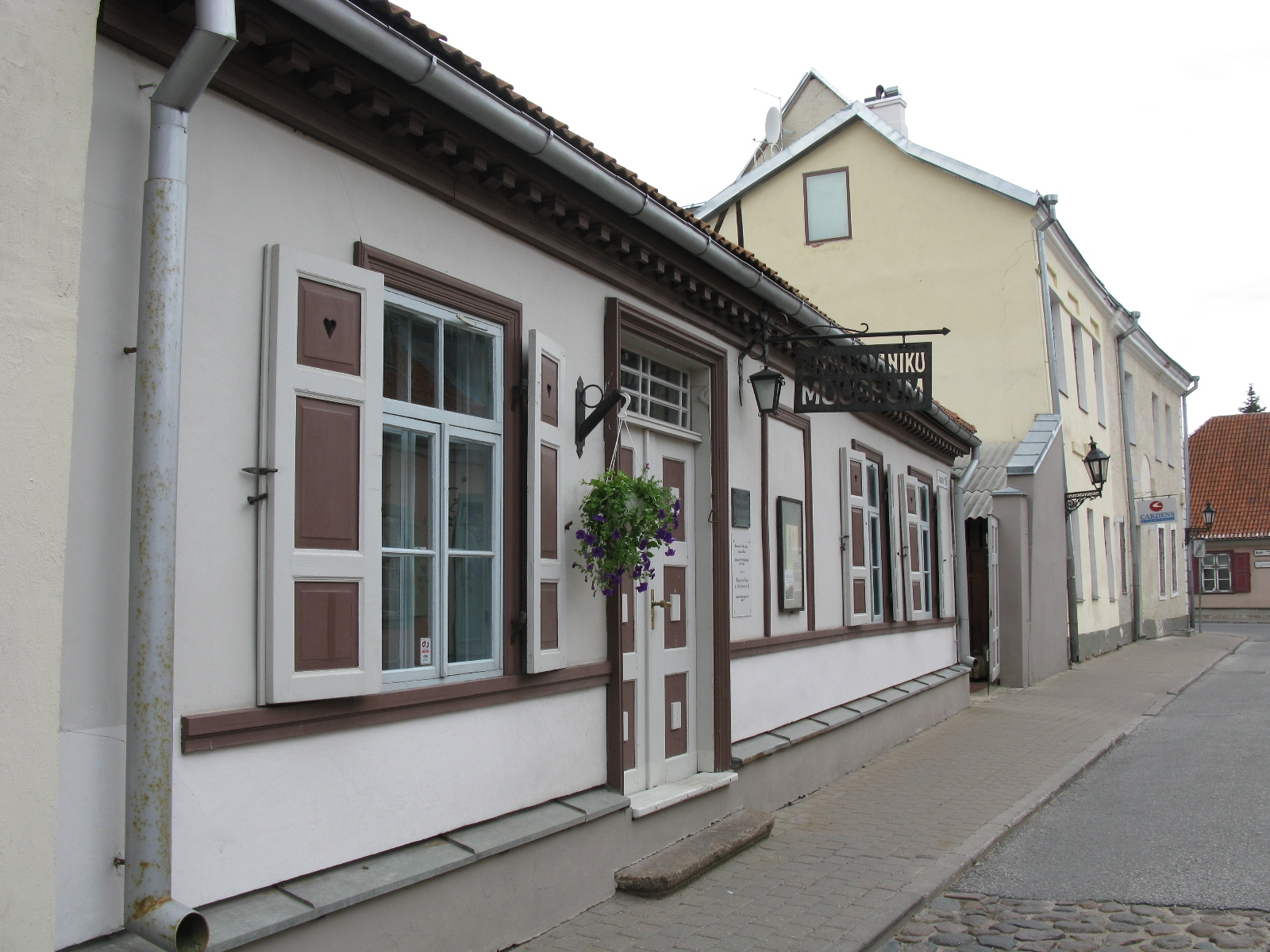
19th-century Tartu Citizen's Museum

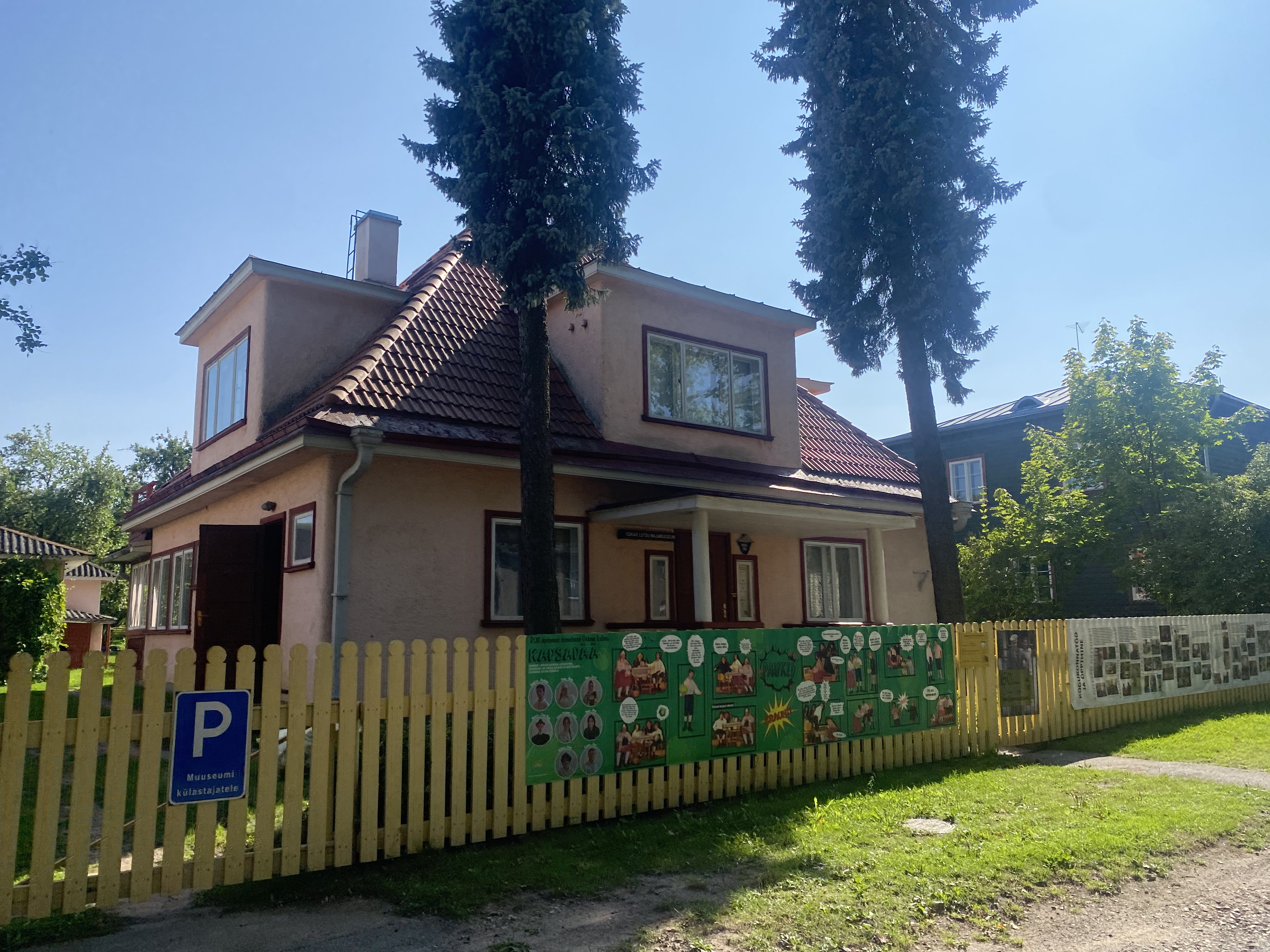
Oskar Luts House Museum

== Collections ==
As of the end of 2023, the museum's collections comprised 190,499 objects. These included 76,773 archaeological objects, 58,673 photographs, 31,178 archival items, 14,990 historical objects, 6,851 numismatic objects, 1,930 works of art and 104 audiovisual objects.
