= Mark Soosaar =

Estonian filmmaker and politician

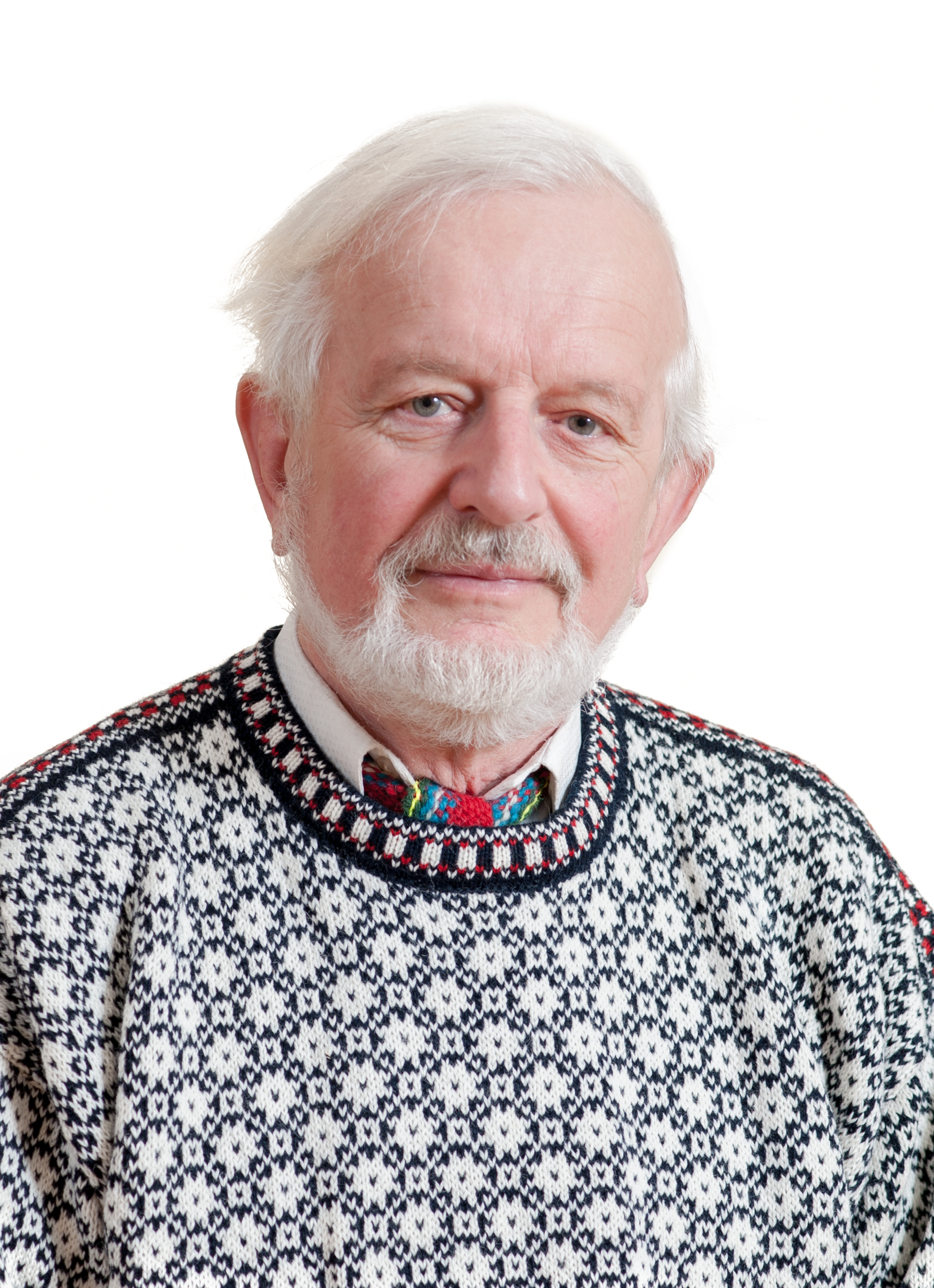
Mark Soosaar in 2015.

Mark Soosaar (officially Mark-Toomas Soosaar; born 12 January 1946 in Viljandi) is an Estonian film director, cinematographer, screenwriter and politician. He has been a member of the X and XI Riigikogu.

Soosaar graduated from the All-Union State Institute of Cinematography in 1970. He worked for Eesti Televisioon from 1970 until 1978 and Tallinnfilm from 1978 until in 1991 as a director and cinematographer before moving to Pärnu and founding his own film studio, Weiko Saawa Film. He is the director of Museum of New Art, as well the founding chairman of the Kihnu Cultural Institute.

He is a member of the Estonian Social Democratic Party.
