= Estonian Agricultural Museum =

Agricultural museum in Estonia

Coordinates: 58.3165°N 26.7244°E

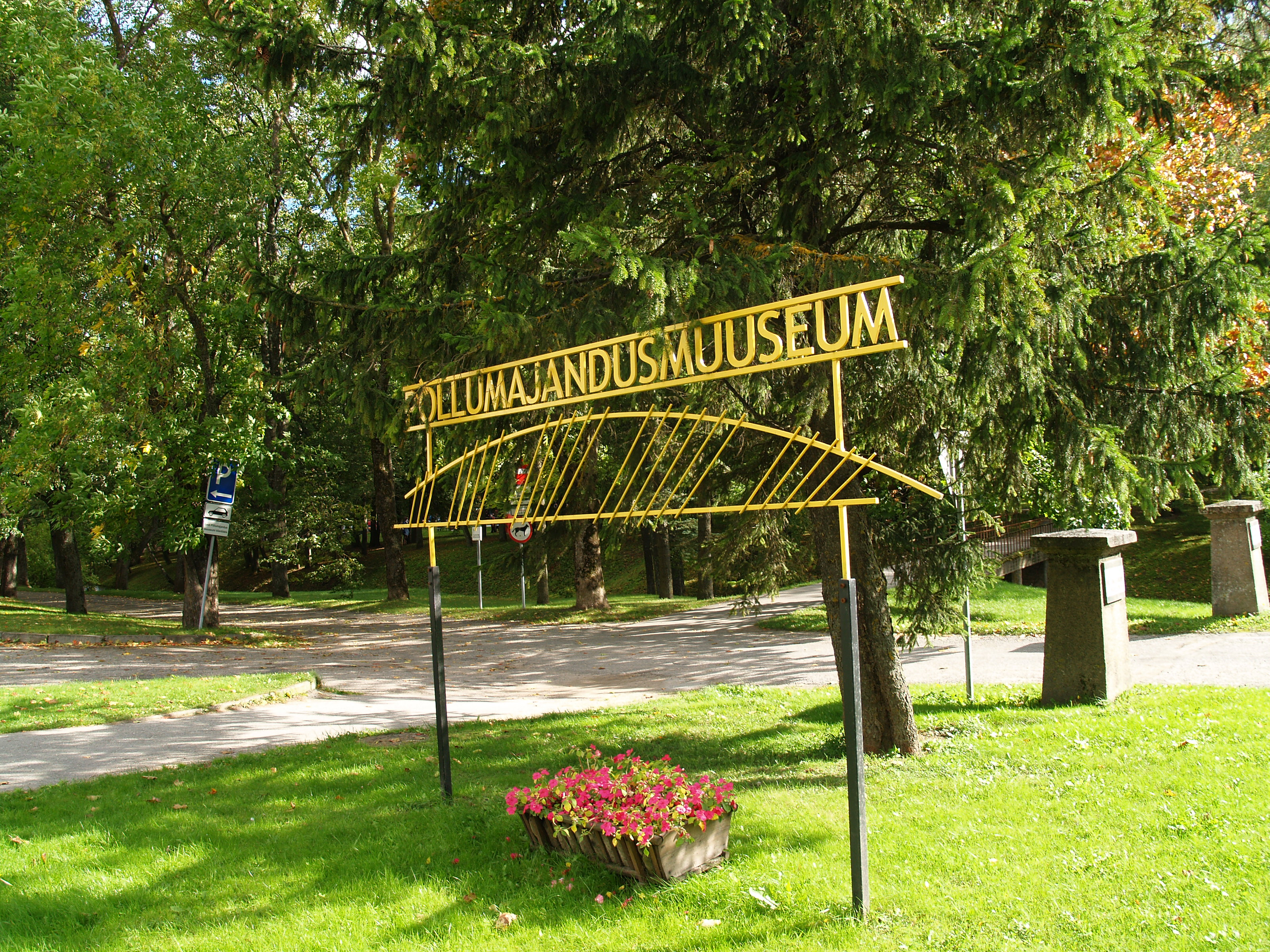
Museum entrance

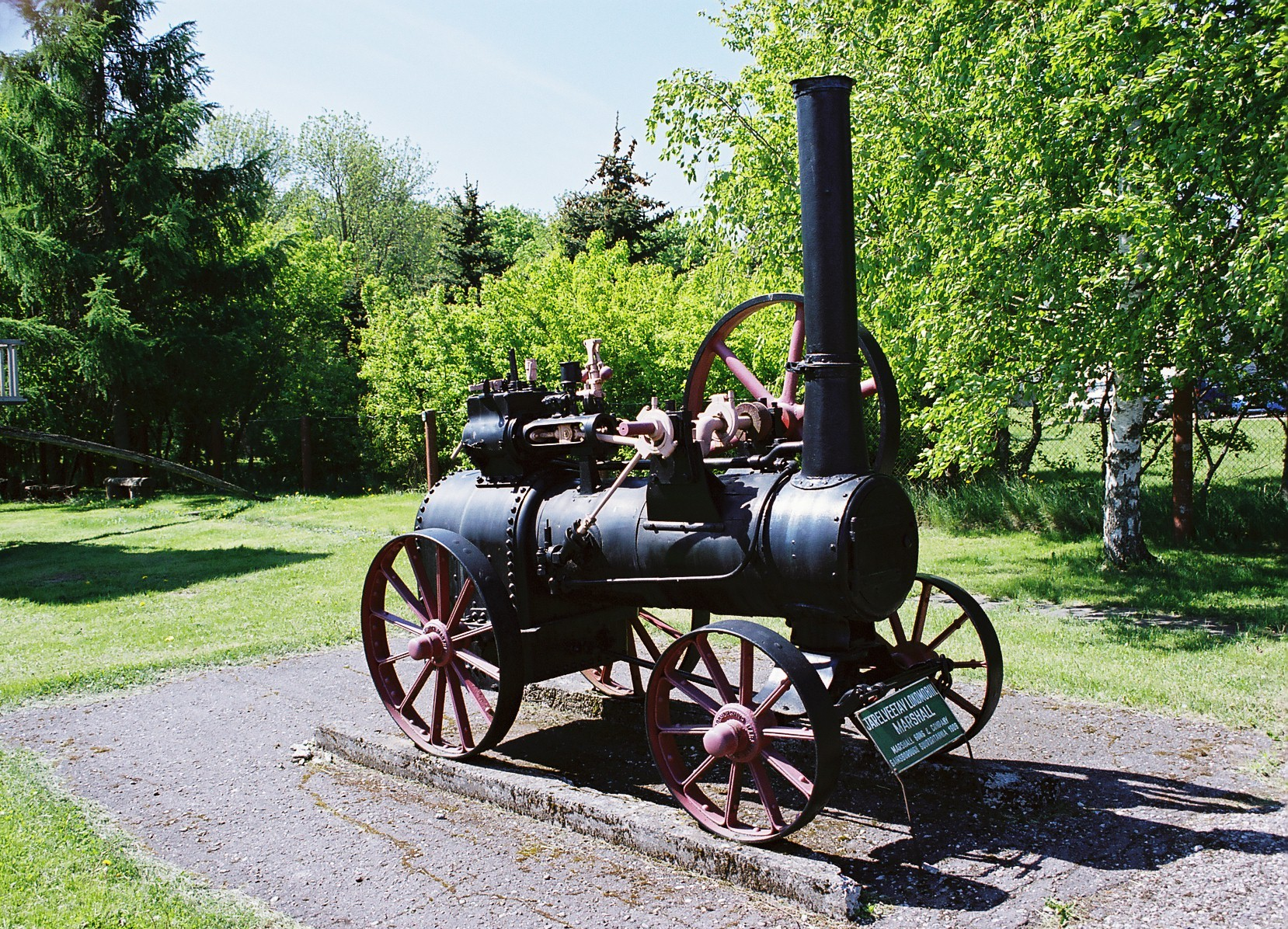
Steam tractor

Estonian Agricultural Museum (Estonian: Eesti Põllumajandusmuuseum) is an agricultural museum in Ülenurme, Tartu County, Estonia. The museum exhibits Estonian rural heritage, including culinary traditions, and features Estonia's largest collection of pre-WW2 steam engines and locomotives.

Some activities in museum:

- baking rye bread
- grain and flax processing
- wood and metal working
- exhibiting farm animal breeds.
