= Varbuse =

Village in Estonia

- Village
- Location in Estonia
- Coordinates: 58°01′35″N 26°54′40″E
- Country: Estonia
- County: Põlva County
- Municipality: Kanepi Parish

Population (2011 census)
  - Total: 30

Varbuse is a village in Kanepi Parish, Põlva County in southeastern Estonia. It is located about 9 km northeast of Kanepi, the centre of the municipality, and about 9 km southwest of the town of Põlva. As of the 2011 census, the village's population was 30.

The Estonian Road Museum is located in the former Varbuse coaching inn.

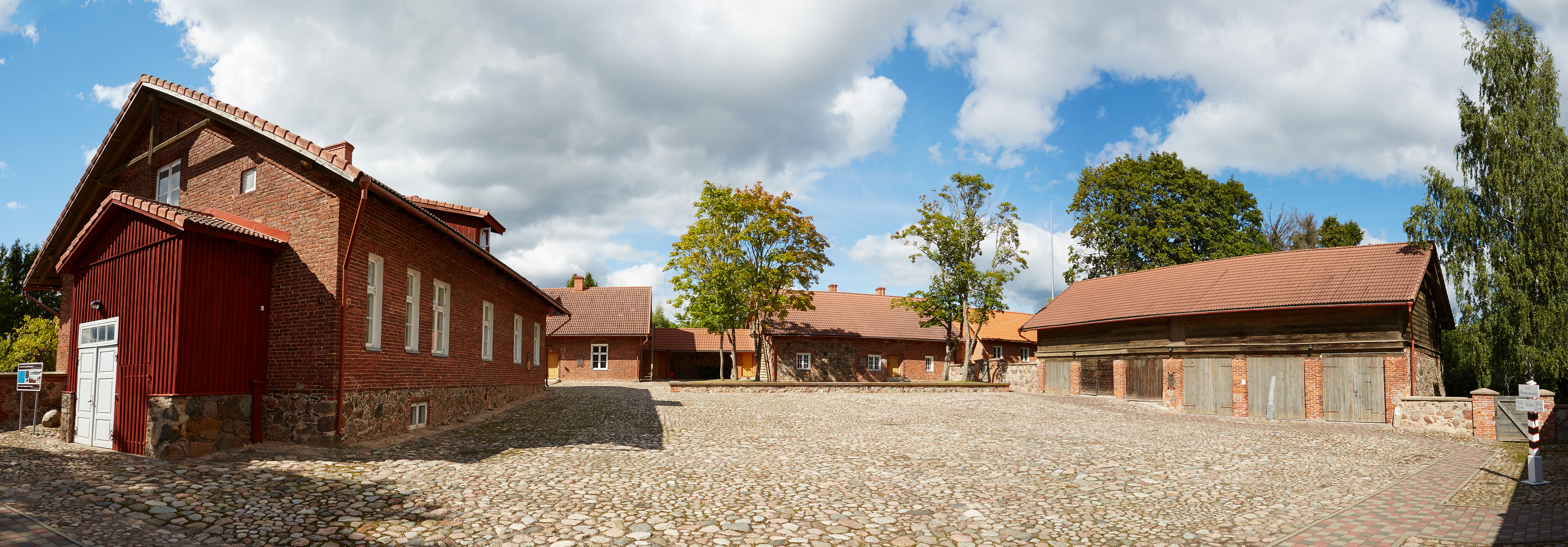
Varbuse coaching inn

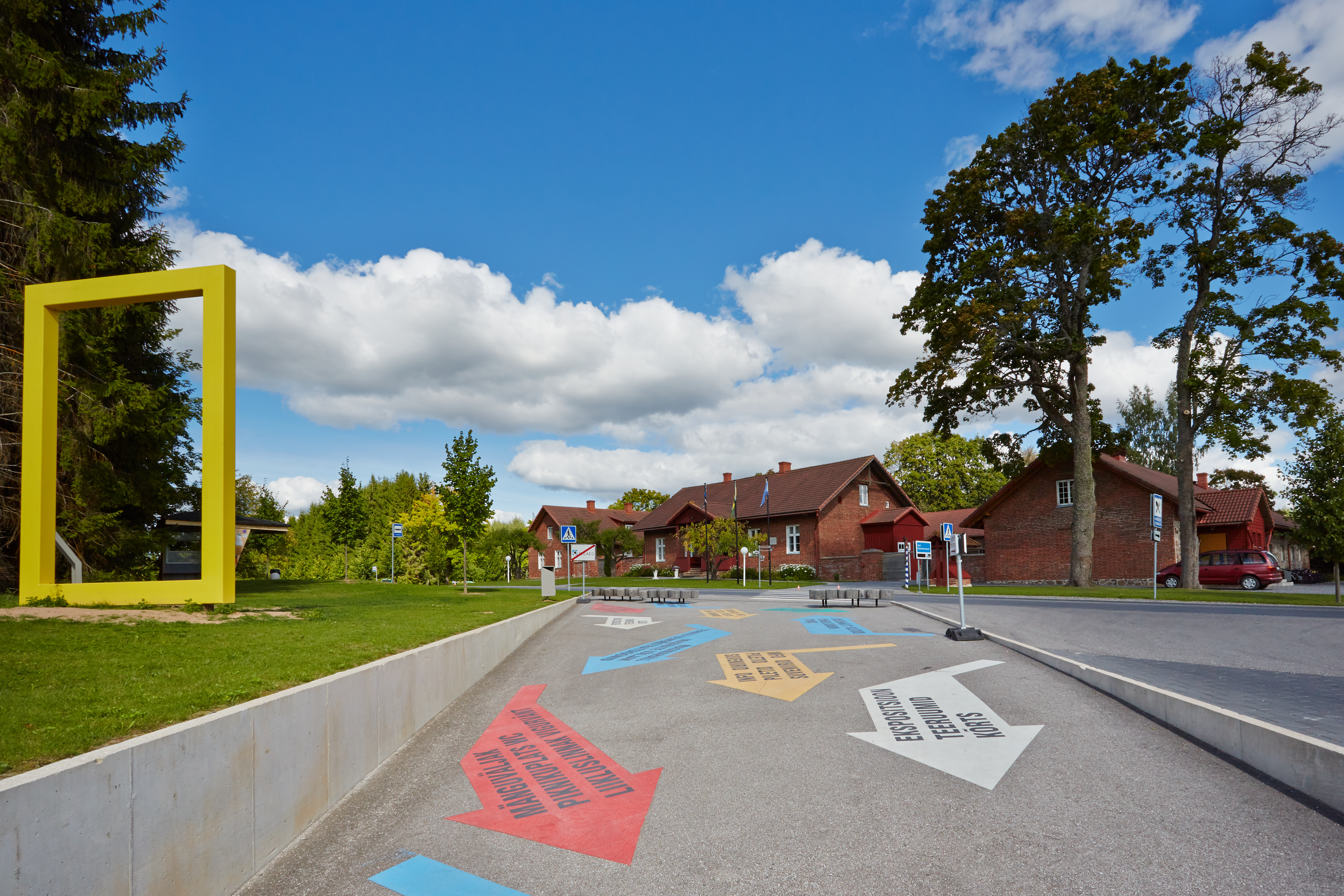
Estonian Road Museum

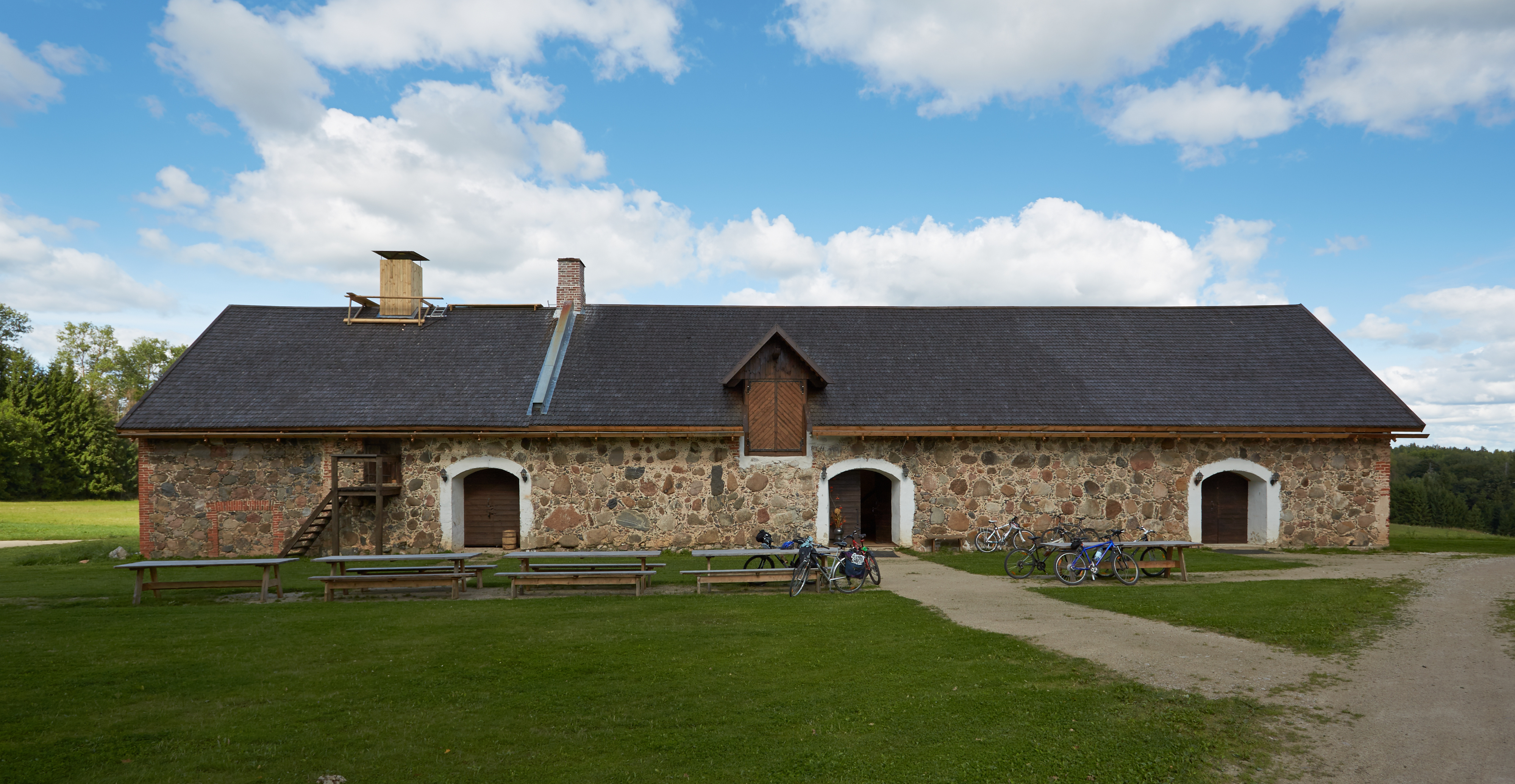
Varbuse Manor granary
