= Estonian Road Museum =

Museum in Estonia

Coordinates: 58.01607°N 26.91317°E

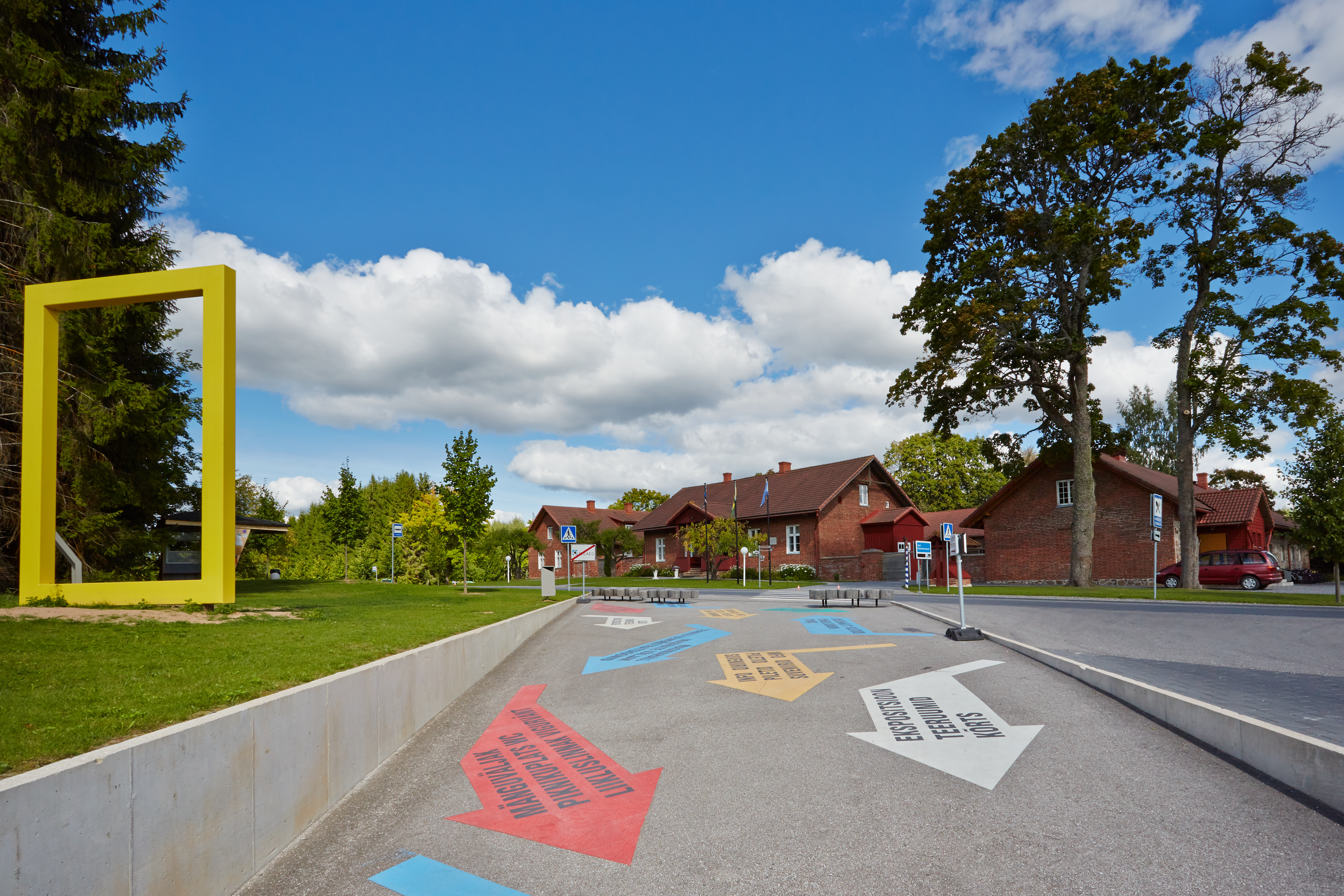
Estonian Road Museum

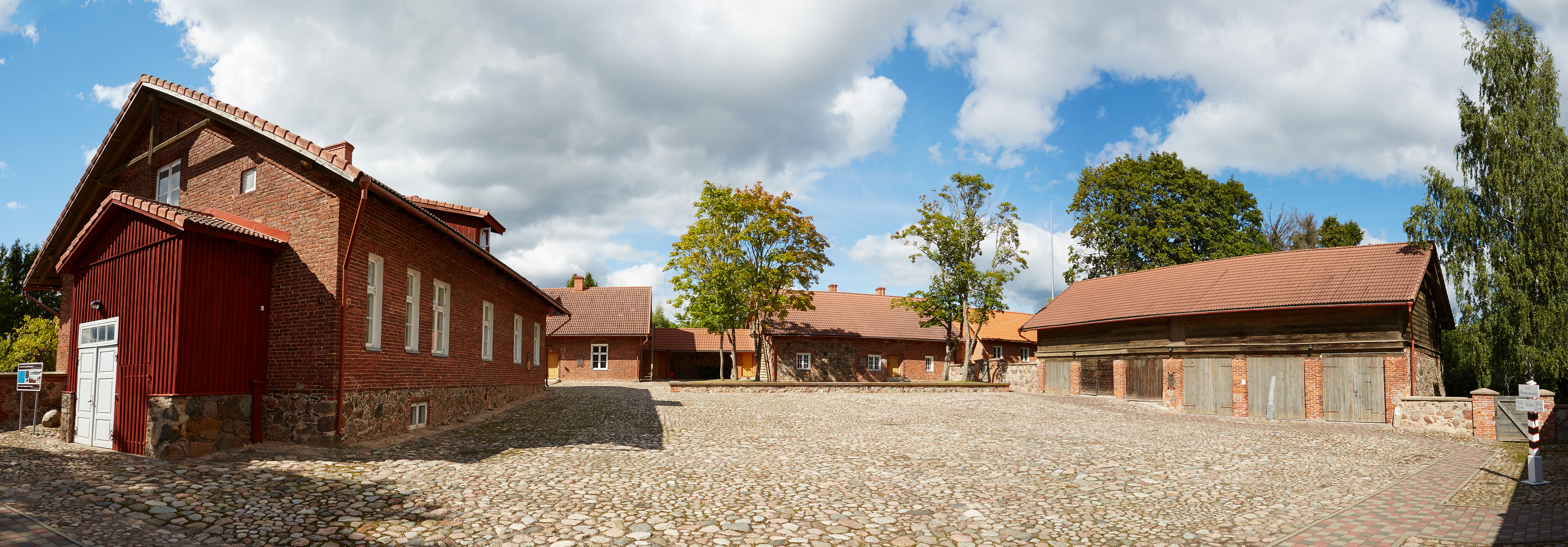
Buildings of the museum

Estonian Road Museum (Estonian: Eesti Maanteemuuseum) is a museum in Põlva County, Varbuse, Estonia. The museum is owned by Estonian Road Administration, which is a subunit of Ministry of Economic Affairs and Communications. The purpose of the museum is to collect, preserve, interpret, and exhibit items related to Estonian roads, road buildings and traffic heritage.

== Collections ==
The museum was opened on 6 June 2005, with the first permanent exhibition, entitled “Tee ajalugu!”, located in what was previously the Varbuse postal station. This exhibition was awarded Exhibition of the Year and won the National Museum Rat Award 2006. The permanent exhibition "Have a Great Journey" is now located in this building, which explores the history of roads.

In total, the museum contains about 43,000 items, and covers nearly 10 hectares. The museum is divided into to two sections, on either side of the historic road.

In summer 2019, 1,500-square-metre (16,000 sq ft) the machinery hall was opened, and amongst other things the hall exhibits collection of road construction machinery until 1985, the story of the development of public transport in Estonia and an exploration of the development of car culture. The museum has also the biggest road grader collection in Eastern Europe, and a variety of Estonian made and Soviet-era vehicles, including trucks and motorbikes.

The museum also hosts a traffic town for children with miniature vehicles.
