= Museum of New Art, Pärnu =

Museum in Pärnu, Estonia

Museum of New Art
- Uue Kunsti Muuseum
- Established: 1992
- Location: Rüütli 40a, Pärnu, 80011 Pärnu maakond, Estonia
- Coordinates: 58°23′07″N 24°30′18″E
- Type: Art museum
- Collection size: over 2000 archival units
- Website: mona.ee

Museum of New Art, Pärnu (Estonian: Uue Kunsti Muuseum) is an art museum / art gallery in Pärnu, Estonia. Museum's director is Mark Soosaar.

The museum was established in 1992 as Chaplin's Art Centre. In 1998, the museum was renamed.

One of the most notable exhibition is the act exhibition "Mees ja naine" (Man and Woman).

The museum has a collection of over 2000 archival units. The collection's main expert is Edward Lucie-Smith.
