= Estonian Health Museum =

Museum in Tallinn

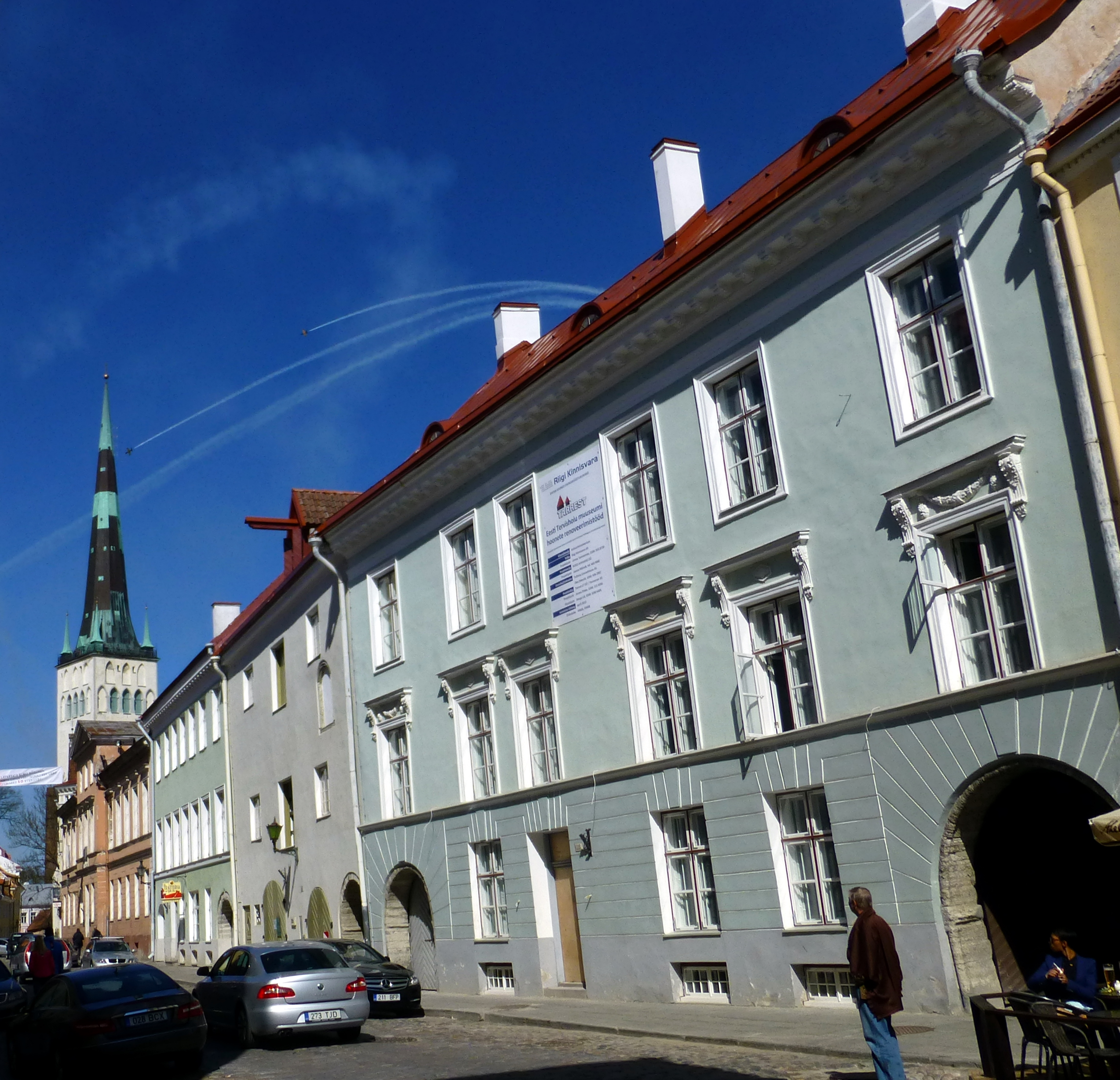
- Museum building (May 2012)
- Former name: Estonian Healthcare Museum
- Established: 1922
- Website: https://tervisemuuseum.ee/en/

The Estonian Health Museum (Estonian: Eesti Tervisemuuseum) is a museum in Tallinn, Estonia. It focuses on human anatomy, physiology, health, and well‑being, presenting these topics through interactive and educational exhibitions designed for visitors of all ages. The museum collects, exhibits, and analyzes objects related to healthcare in Estonia. It is located at Lai 30 in Tallinn's old town, a UNESCO World Heritage Site.

The Estonian Healthcare Museum was founded in 1921 in Tartu. During the Soviet occupation of Estonia, the museum was closed and many of its items were destroyed. The museum re-opened in 1980 in Tallinn as the Republic Health Museum of the Sanitation Education Centre. In 1989, when it was reorganized as an independent institution, the museum changed its name back to the Estonian Healthcare Museum. In November 2020, the institution changed its name to the Estonian Health Museum.

== Permanent exhibition ==
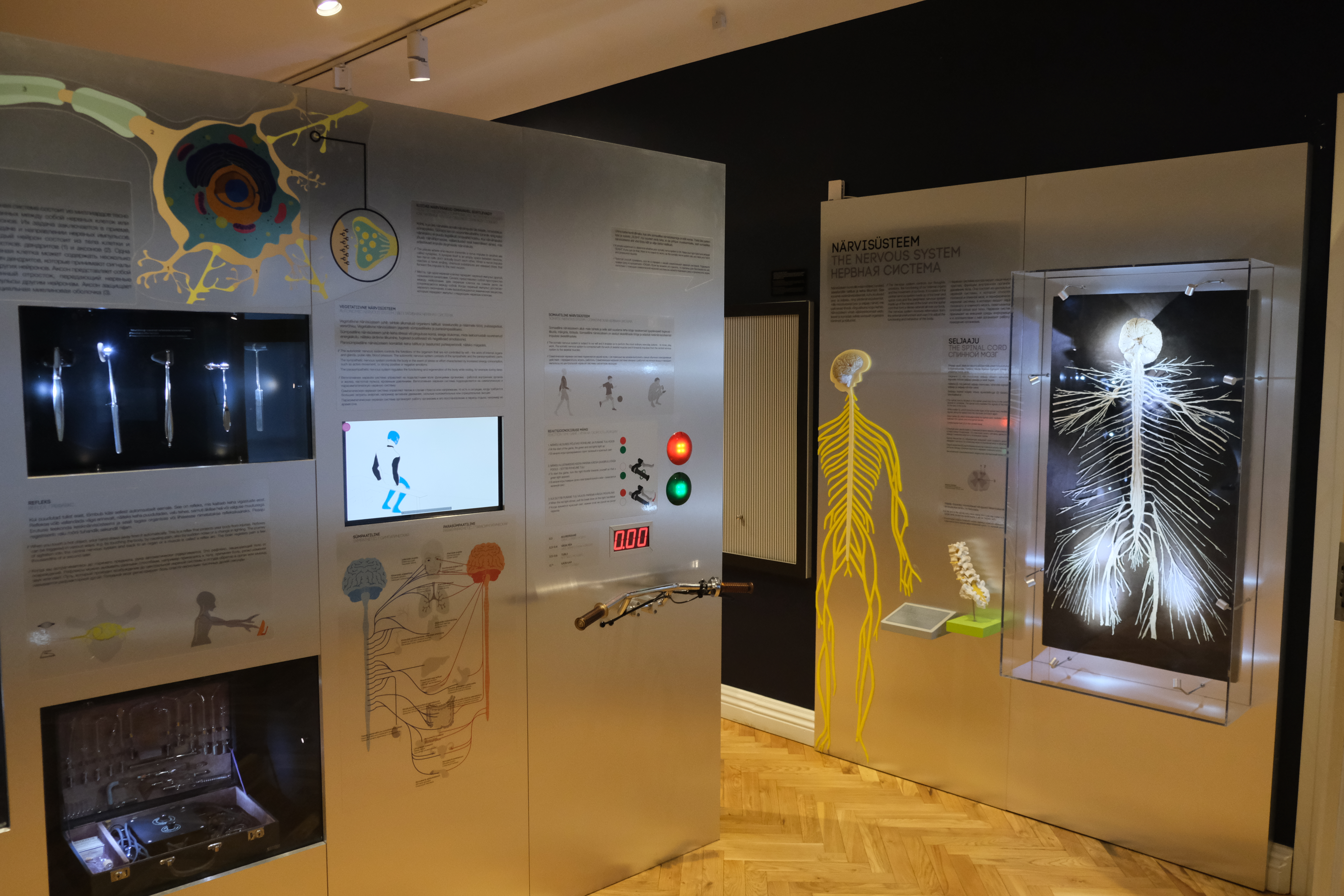
Thematic room "Brain and nerves" in Estonian Health Museums permanent exhibition in 2026

The permanent exhibition A Heart to Heart About Your Body (Estonian: Avameelselt Sinu kehast) is housed in two renovated medieval buildings. It presents an overview of human anatomy and physiology through display items such as replicas, plastinated organs, explanatory schematics, and electronic and interactive exhibits. Themed rooms explore the structure and function of organ systems and related topics inherent to the human condition, including birth, sexuality, hygiene and addictions. Designed for a broad audience, the exhibition aims to provide an engaging educational experience and to encourage healthy lifestyle choices.

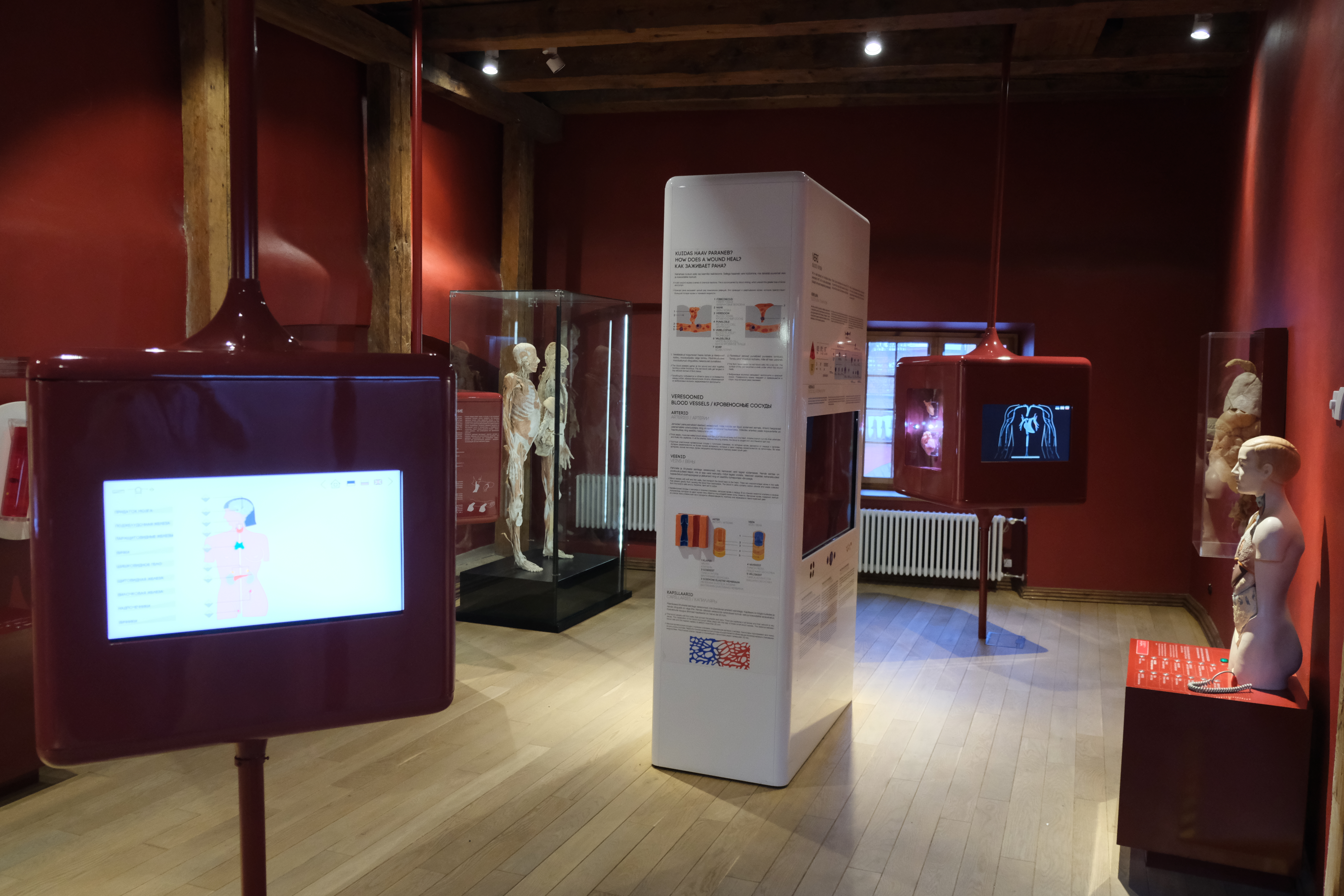
Thematic room "Blood and the lymphatic system. Endocrine glands. Internal organs" in Estonian Health Museums permanent exhibiton in 2026

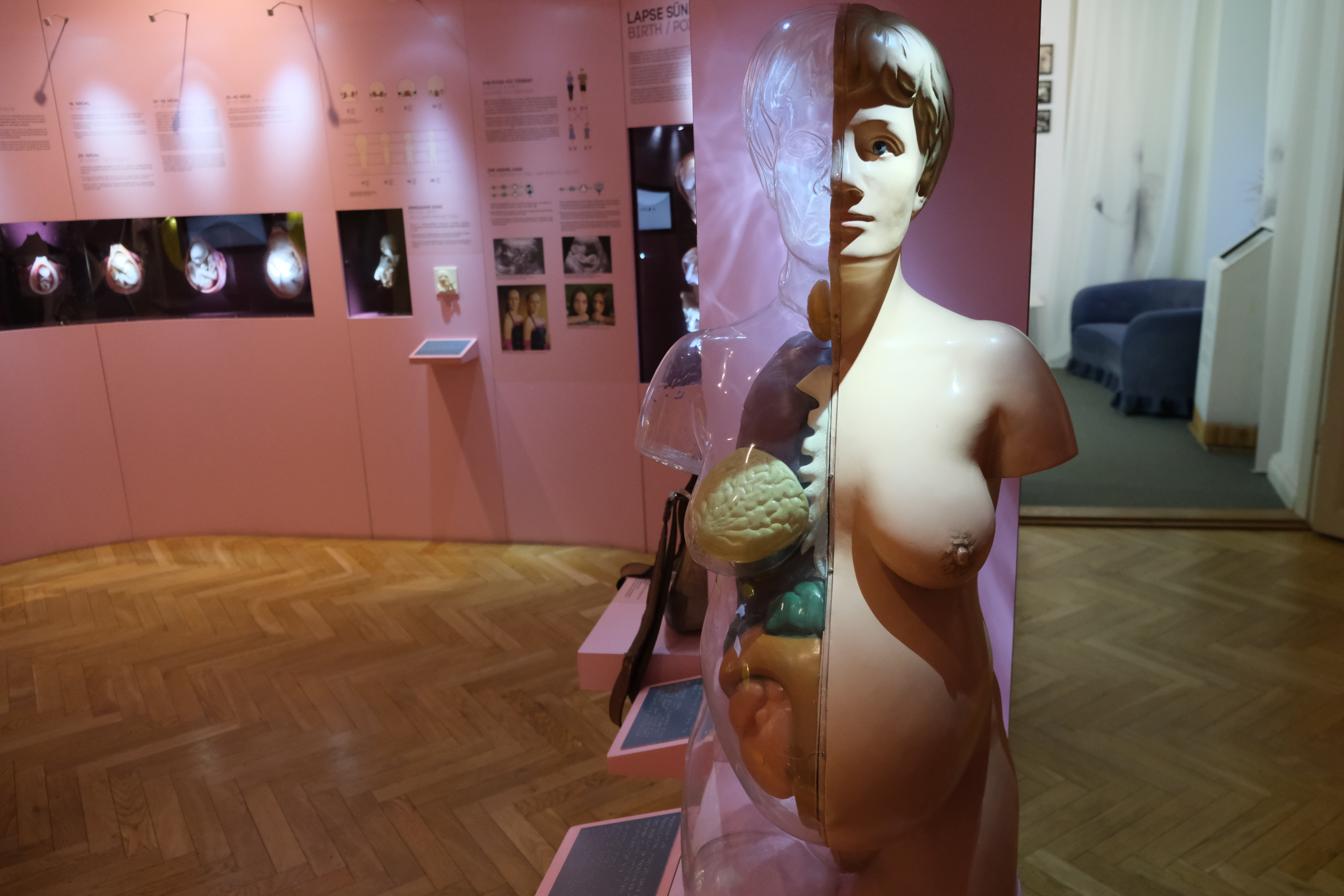
Thematic room "Man and woman. Pregnancy. Childbirth" in Estonian Health Museums permanent exhibiton in 2026

The museum features 15 exhibition rooms on two floors, addressing various aspects of the human body and health:

- Human evolution; bioelements; skin, bones, and muscles
- Blood and the lymphatic system, endocrine glands, internal organs
- DNA and genes
- The cell
- The brain and nerves
- Vision
- Senses
- Nutrition
- Teeth
- Hygiene, bacteria and viruses, parasites
- Man and woman, pregnancy, childbirth
- Natural death
- Sexuality
- Addiction
- The arc of life

"A Heart to Heart About Your Body" received the highest national recognition in the Estonian museum sector in 2015, when it was awarded the Muuseumirott Award for Best Exhibition. In 2016, the museum was nominated for the European Museum of the Year Award (EMYA).

== History ==
The Estonian Health Museum traces its origins to 1922, when a working group was established in Tartu to found a museum dedicated to health education. Led by medical professionals including Professor Aleksander Rammul and secretary Voldemar Sumberg. The initial exhibit opened in 1924, emphasising health promotion and disease prevention through engaging displays. Early activities included travelling exhibitions, radio lectures, public courses, and extensive publications aimed at increasing public health awareness.

In 1929 the museum moved to a larger facility in Tartu (Pepleri 32) and expanded its departments, while also maintaining a travelling collection shown across Estonia. During the Soviet era, following Estonia's annexation and the arrest of Sumberg in 1944, the original museum ceased formal operations and its collections suffered significant loss or destruction. Attempts to revive the institution began in the late 1970s, resulting in a new museum opening in Tallinn in 1980 as part of the Sanitation Education Centre.

The museum regained independent status in 1989 and was reorganised as the Estonian Healthcare Museum, continuing its focus on anatomy, physiology, sexual biology, and health education. Since then it has developed exhibitions, educational programmes, and collaborations with schools and health organisations. The museum later adopted the name Estonian Health Museum to reflect its broader mission.

== Collections ==
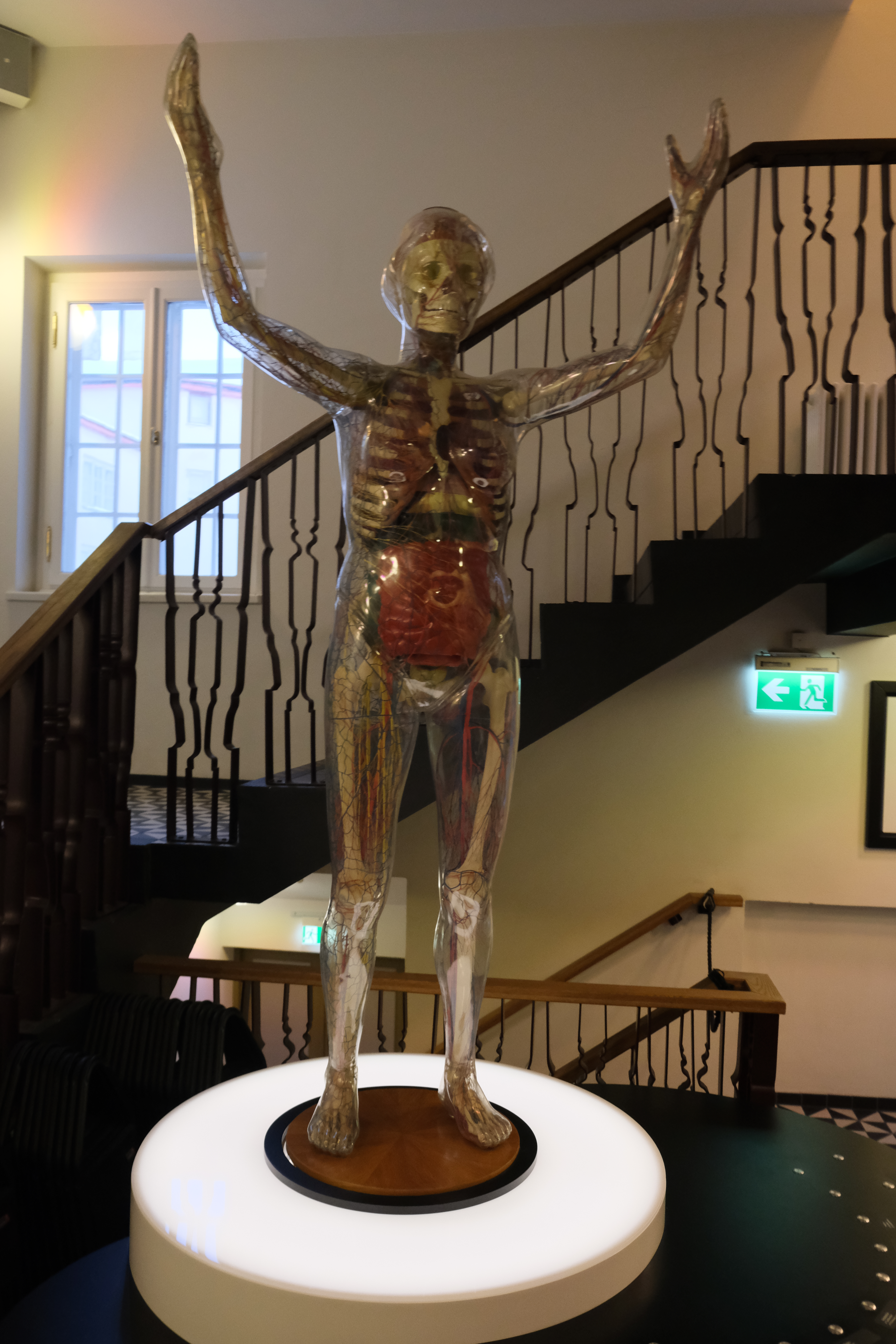
Glass Woman in the Estonian Health Museums exhibition (2026)

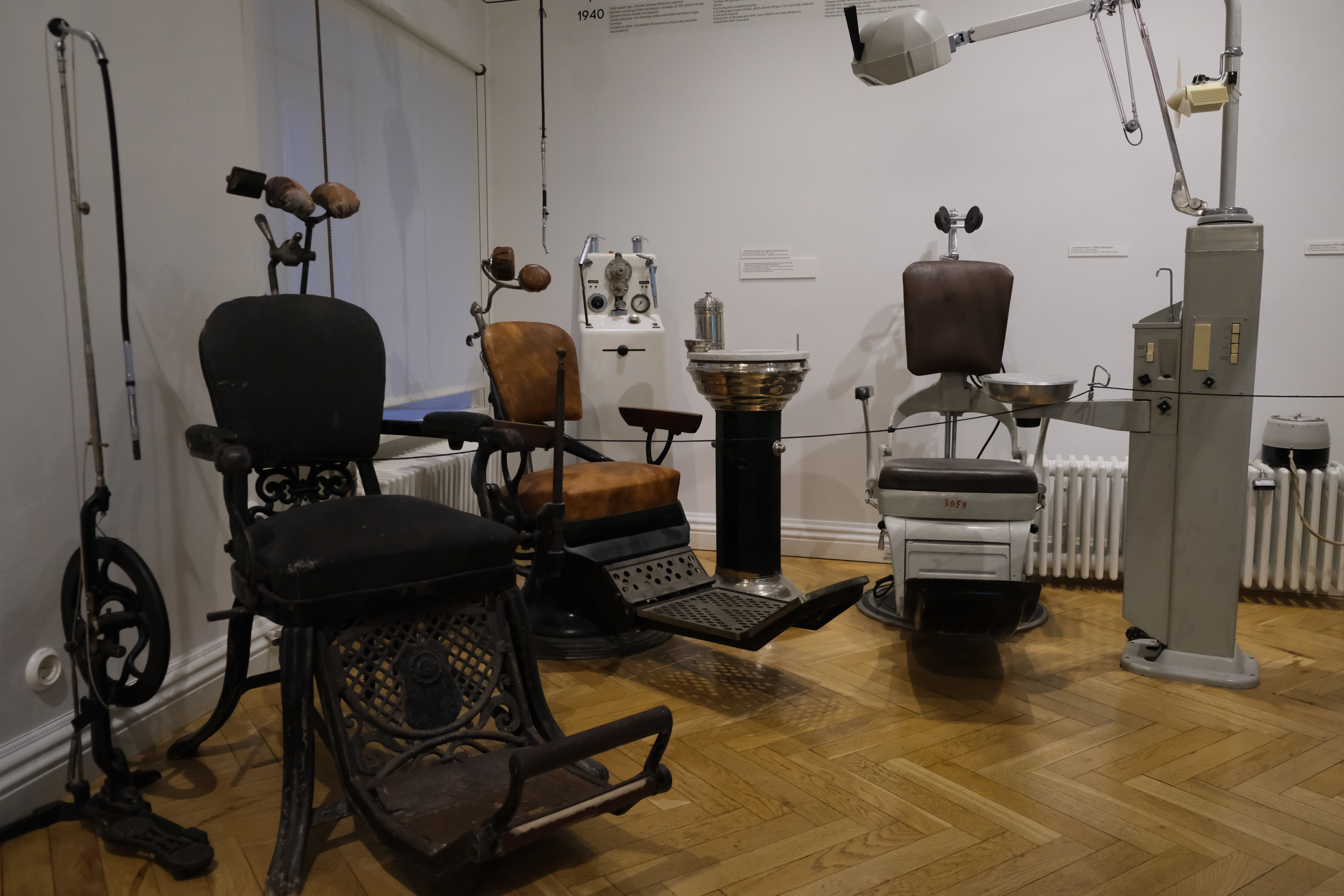
Historical dental chairs from the Estonian Health Museums collections (2026)

The Estonian Health Museum holds a collection of artefacts related to the history of health, medicine, and biomedical practice in Estonia. The collection includes medical instruments, anatomical specimens, photographs, documents, and publications dating mainly from the 19th century to the present. These materials document the development of healthcare, medical education, and public health, as well as the everyday work of medical professionals. As of the 2020 inventory, the main collection contains nearly twenty thousand items divided into four principal categories: objects, photographs, documents, and publications.

The object collection includes medical instruments and apparatus from multiple specialties — such as pharmacology, surgery, ophthalmology, and neurology — as well as anatomical preparations and notable artefacts like historical medicines and a Florence Nightingale Medal.

The photo collection holds over seven thousand images and negatives from the late 19th century to the present, documenting health-related themes and practitioners.

The document collection holds nearly eight thousand items including institutional records, prescriptions, and professional correspondence, which together illuminate developments in Estonian medical education, healthcare organisations, and practice.

The publications collection features thousands of printed works. The oldest publications include German-language doctoral dissertations in medicine from Dorpat (Tartu) from 1870 to 1880. This collection also includes historical posters and postcards.

The museum's collections are accessible digitally through the national Museums Public Portal (MUIS).
