= Tallinn City Museum =

Museum in Tallinn, Estonia

- Tallinna Linnamuuseum
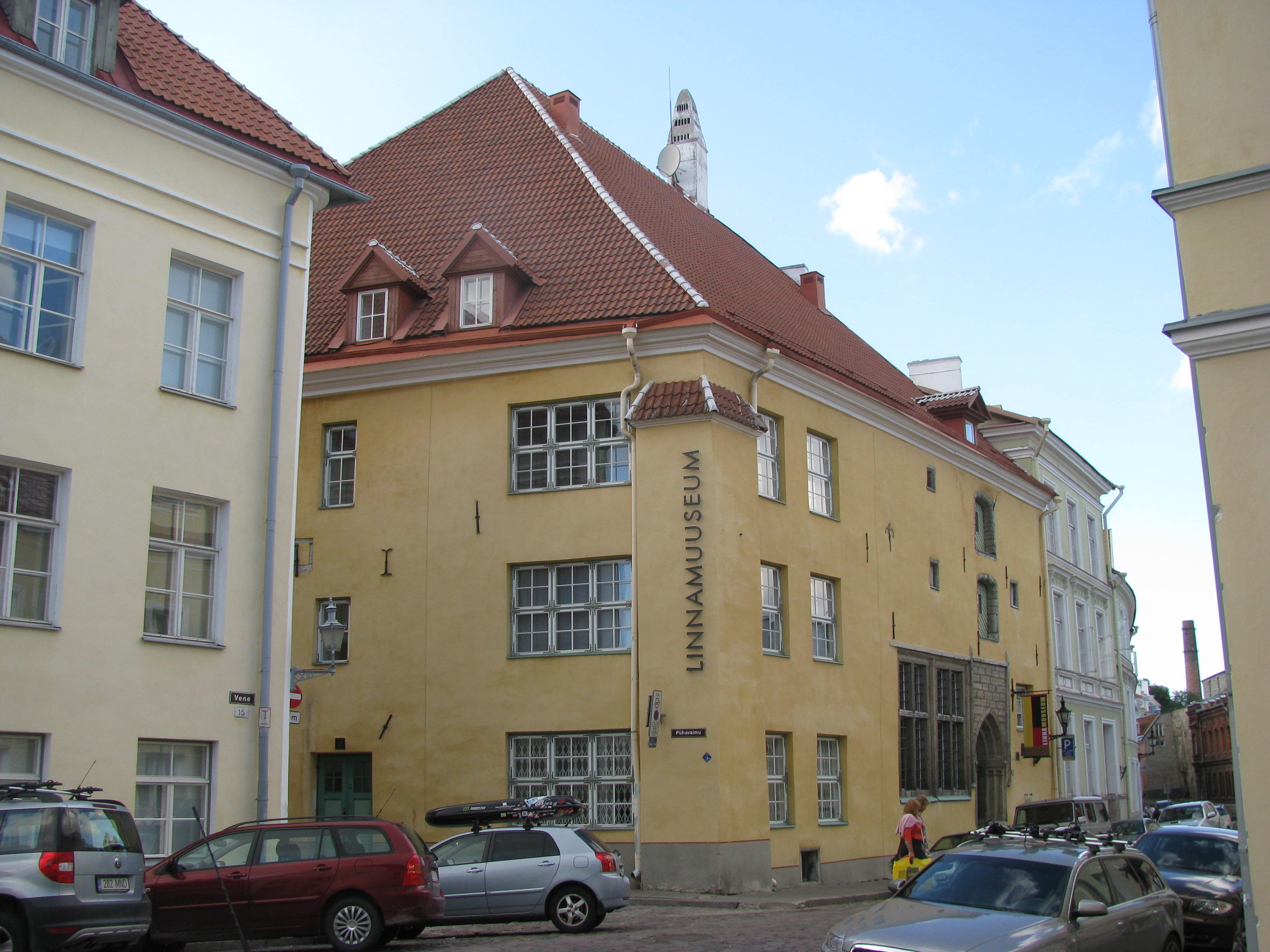
- The museum building on Vene street in 2011
- Interactive fullscreen map
- Established: 1937
- Location: Vene 17, 10123 Tallinn, Estonia
- Coordinates: 59°26′19″N 24°44′53″E
- Website: linnamuuseum.ee

Tallinn City Museum (Estonian: Tallinna Linnamuuseum) is a city museum in Tallinn, Estonia. The museum was founded in 1937 as Historic Museum of the City of Tallinn. Since 2015 the museum co-operates with Google Inc. In October 2016 co-operation resulted from virtual Tallinn City Museum on Google Arts & Culture platform.

== Gallery ==
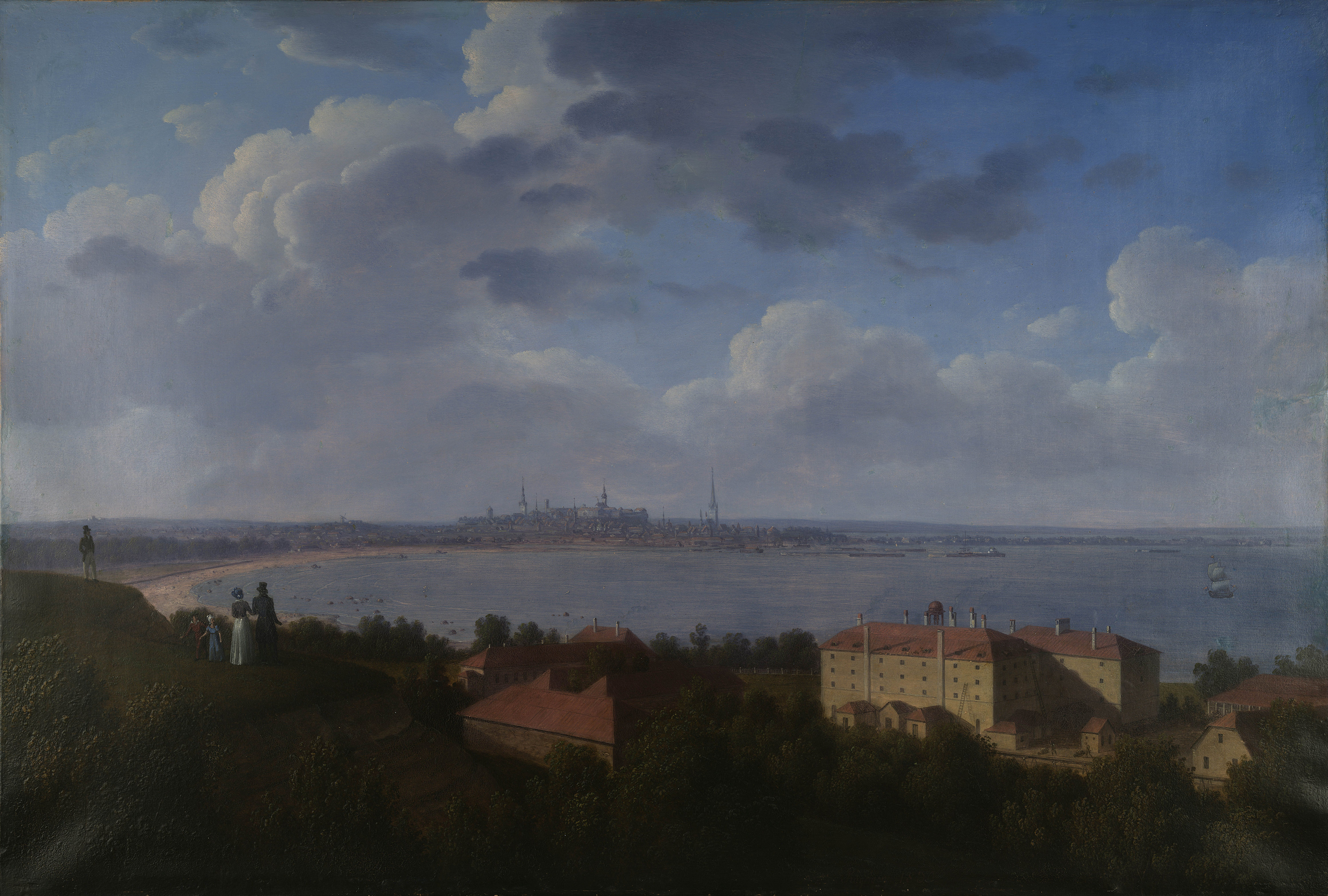
Karl von Kügelgen, The view of Tallinn from the Sugar Factory

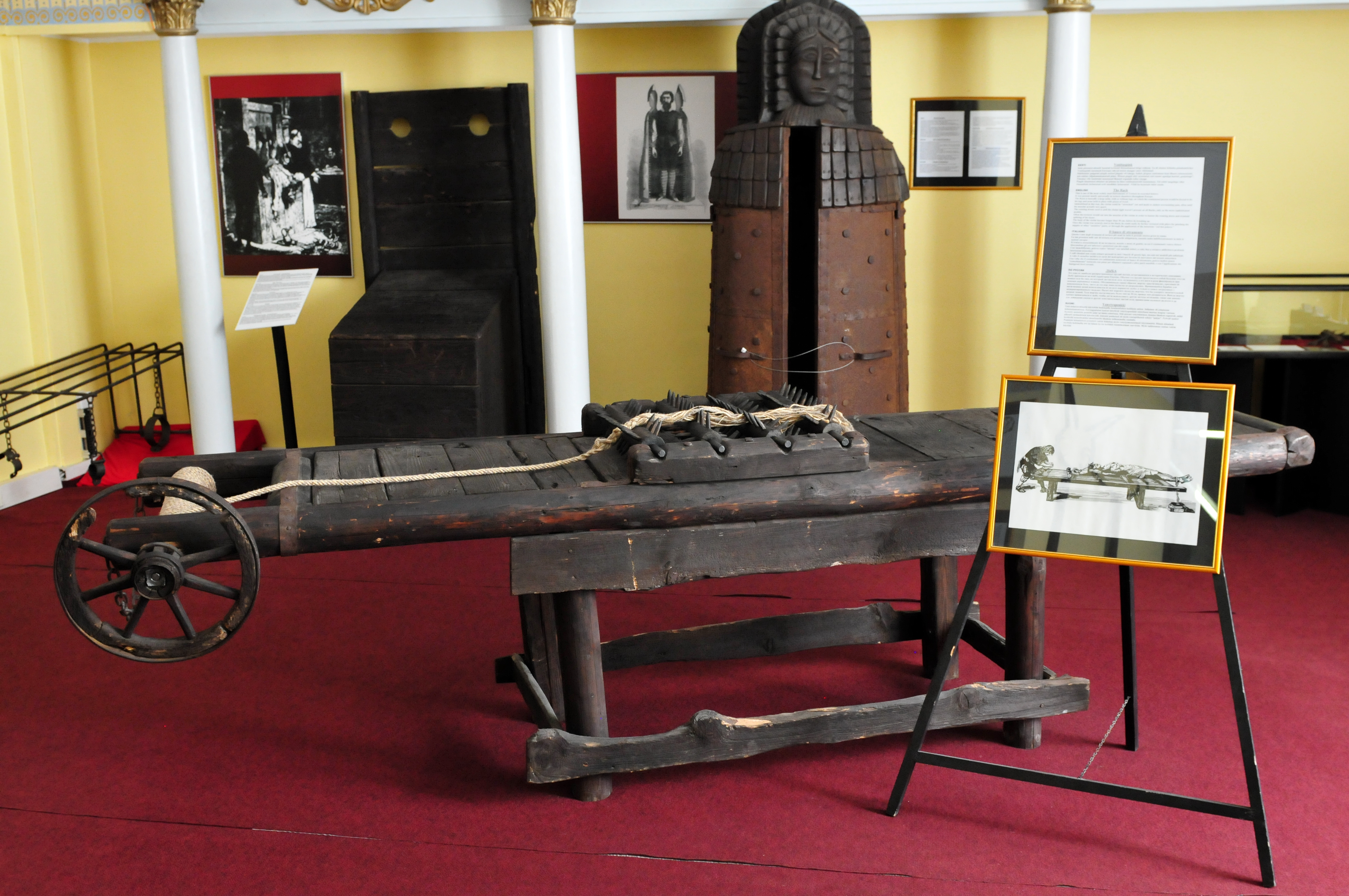
Historical torture devices

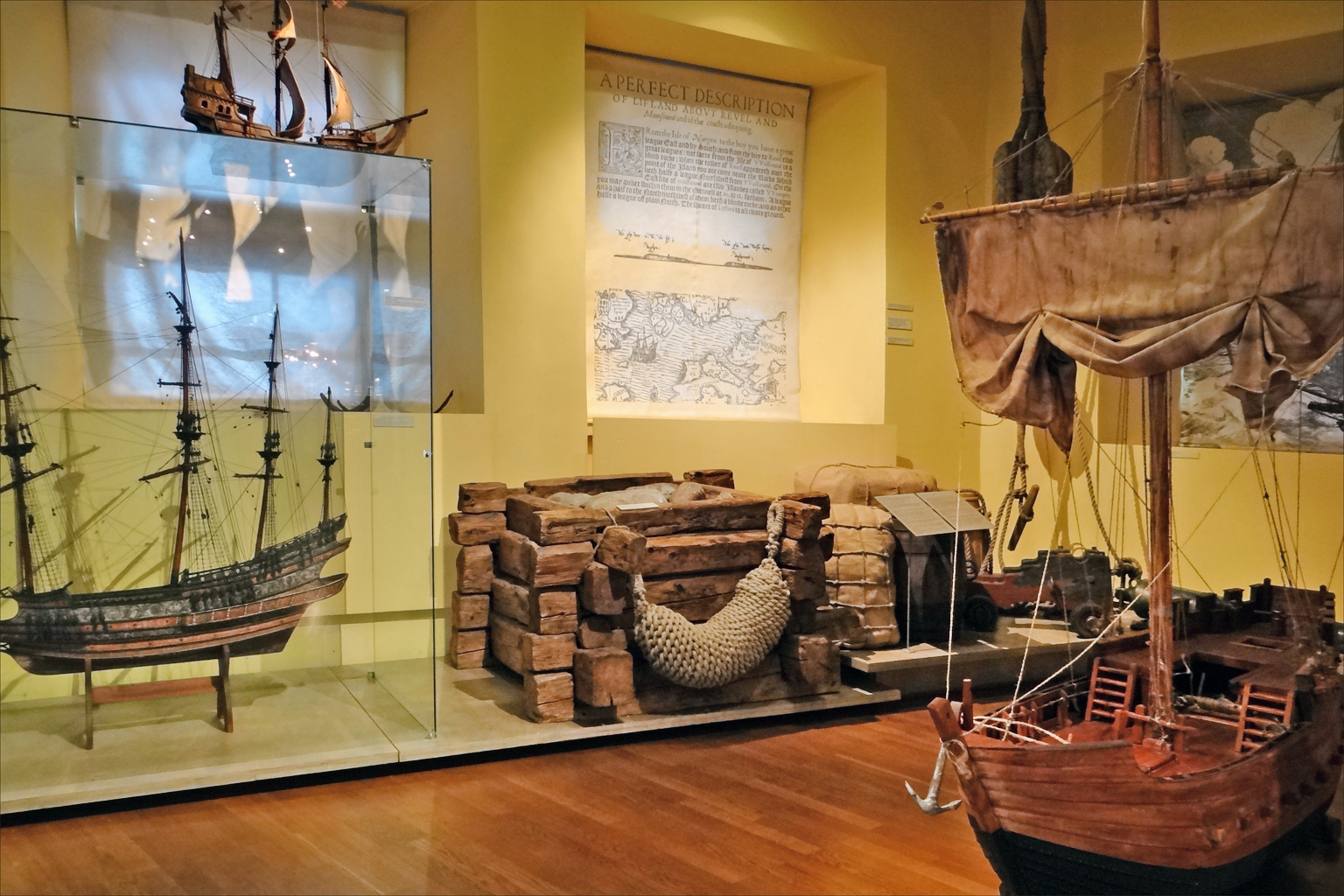
Mockups of medieval merchant vessels

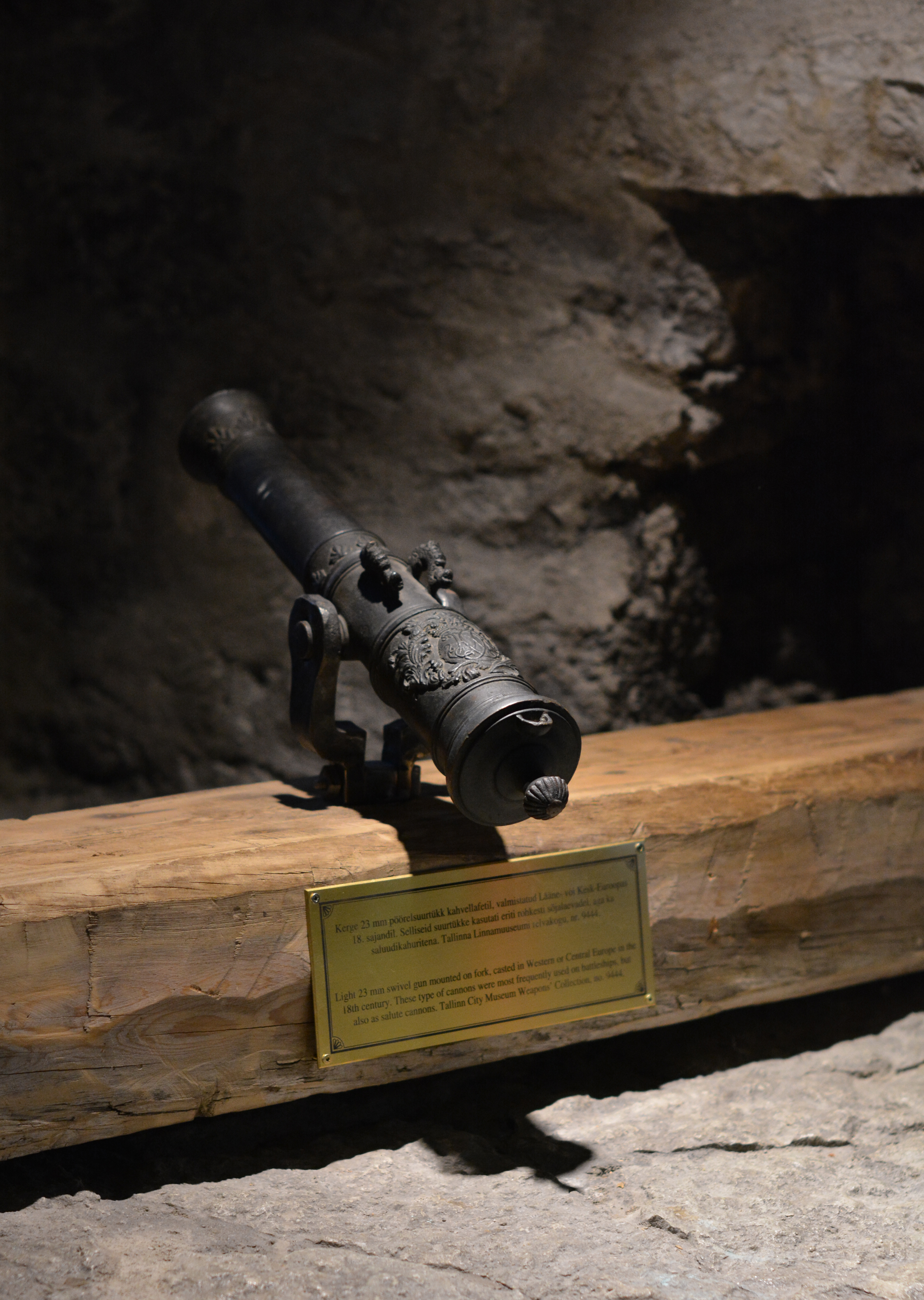
Mockup of cannon

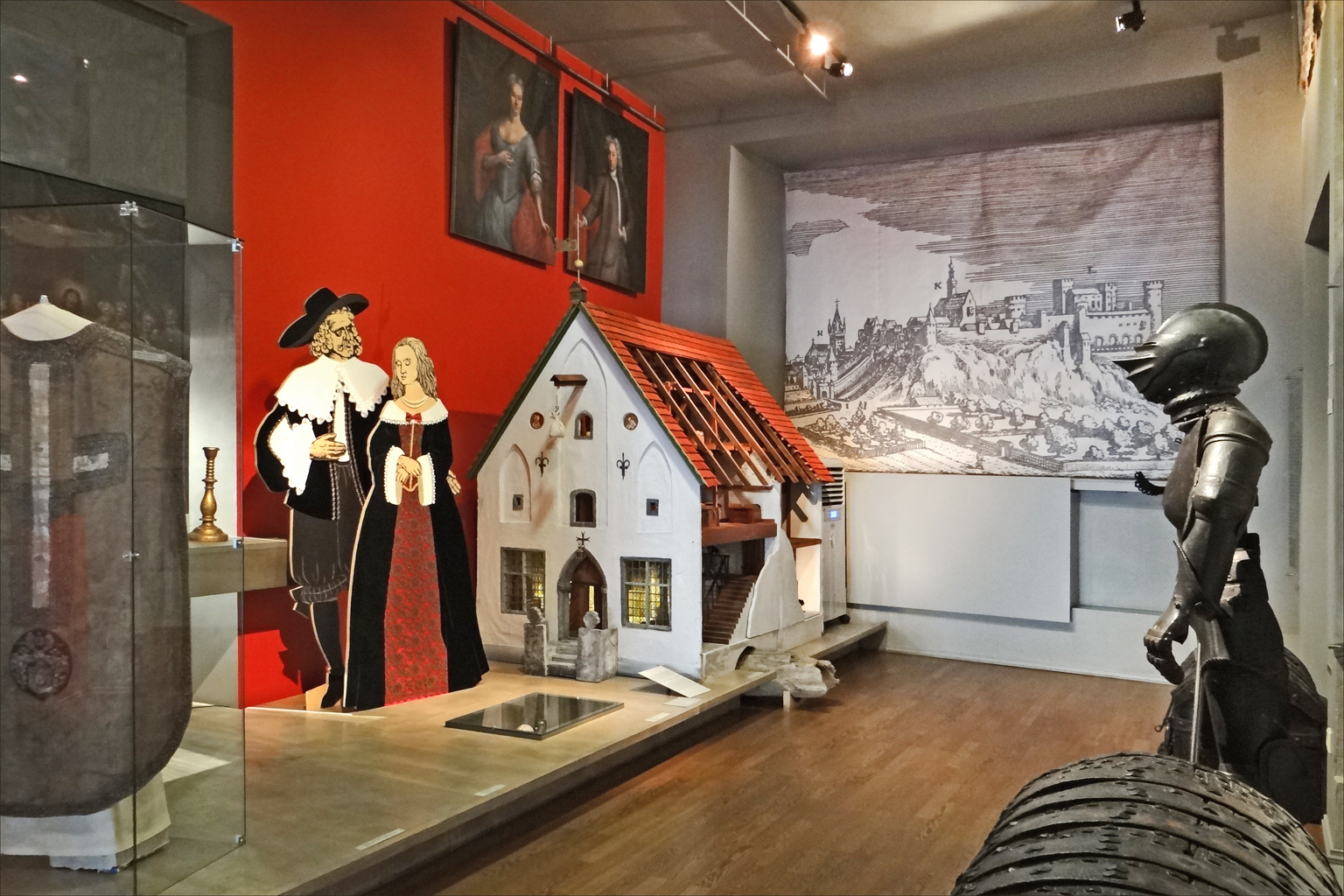
Mockups and relics of medieval Tallinn (Reval)

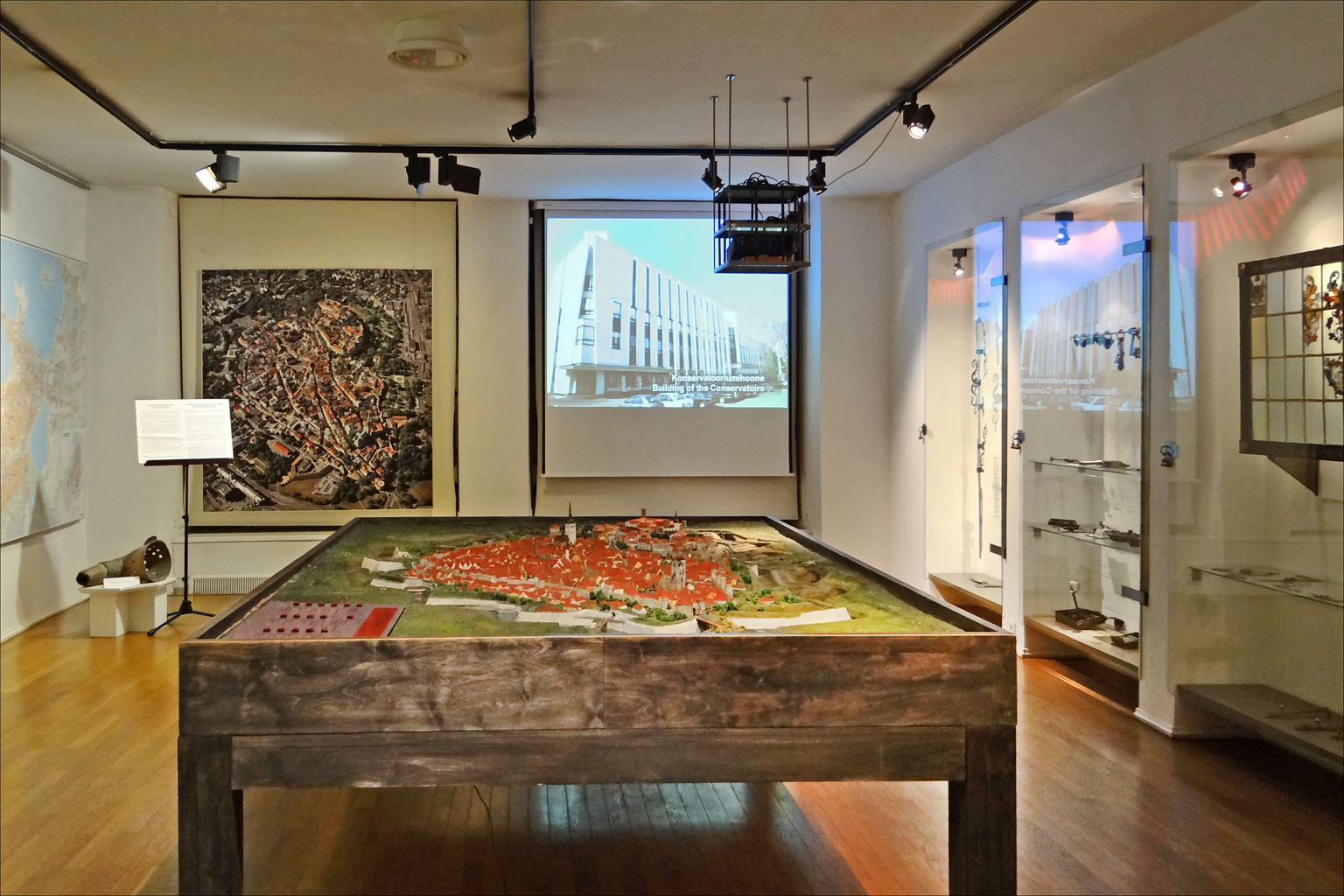
Mockup of Tallinn Old Town

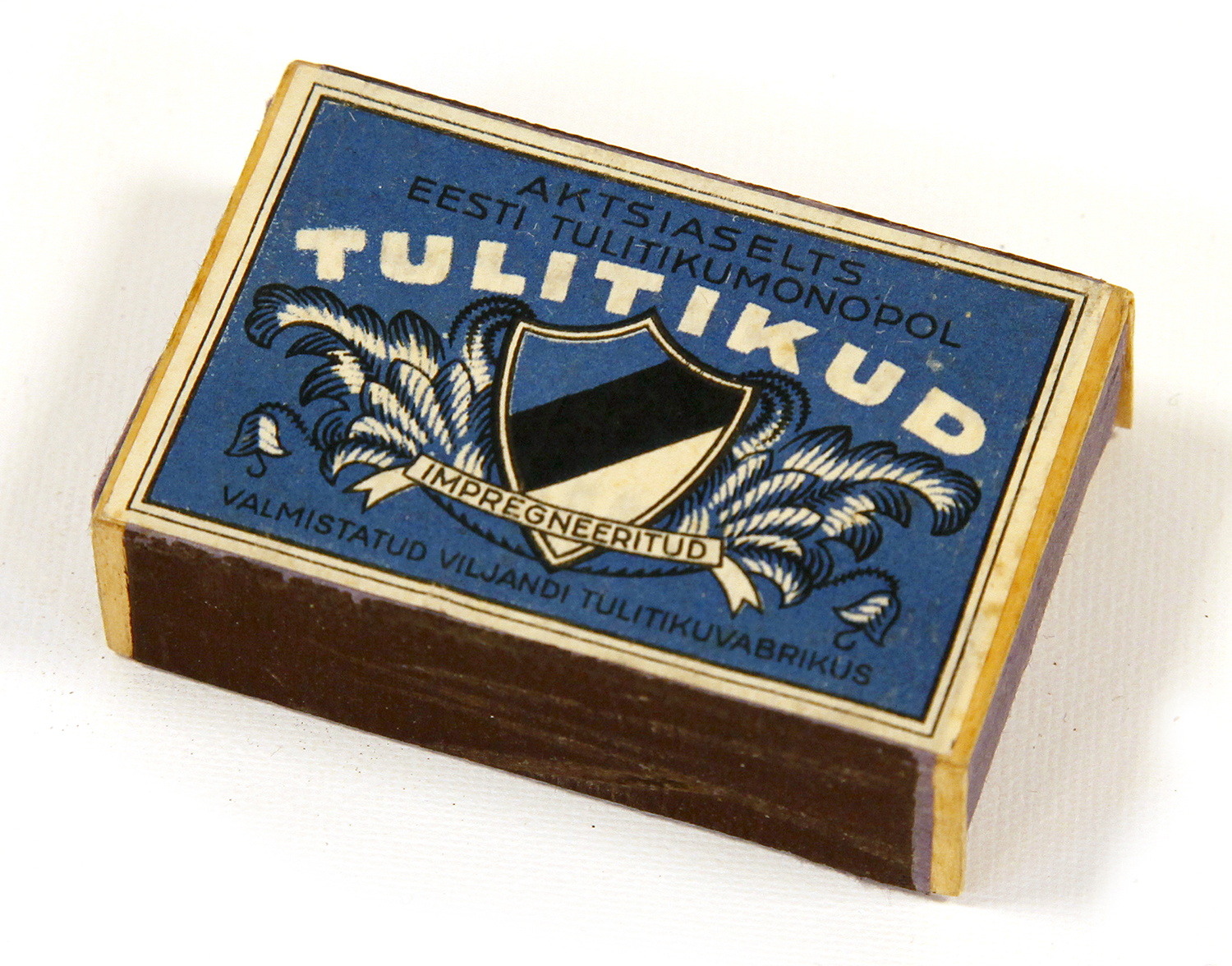
Matchbox by Estonian Match

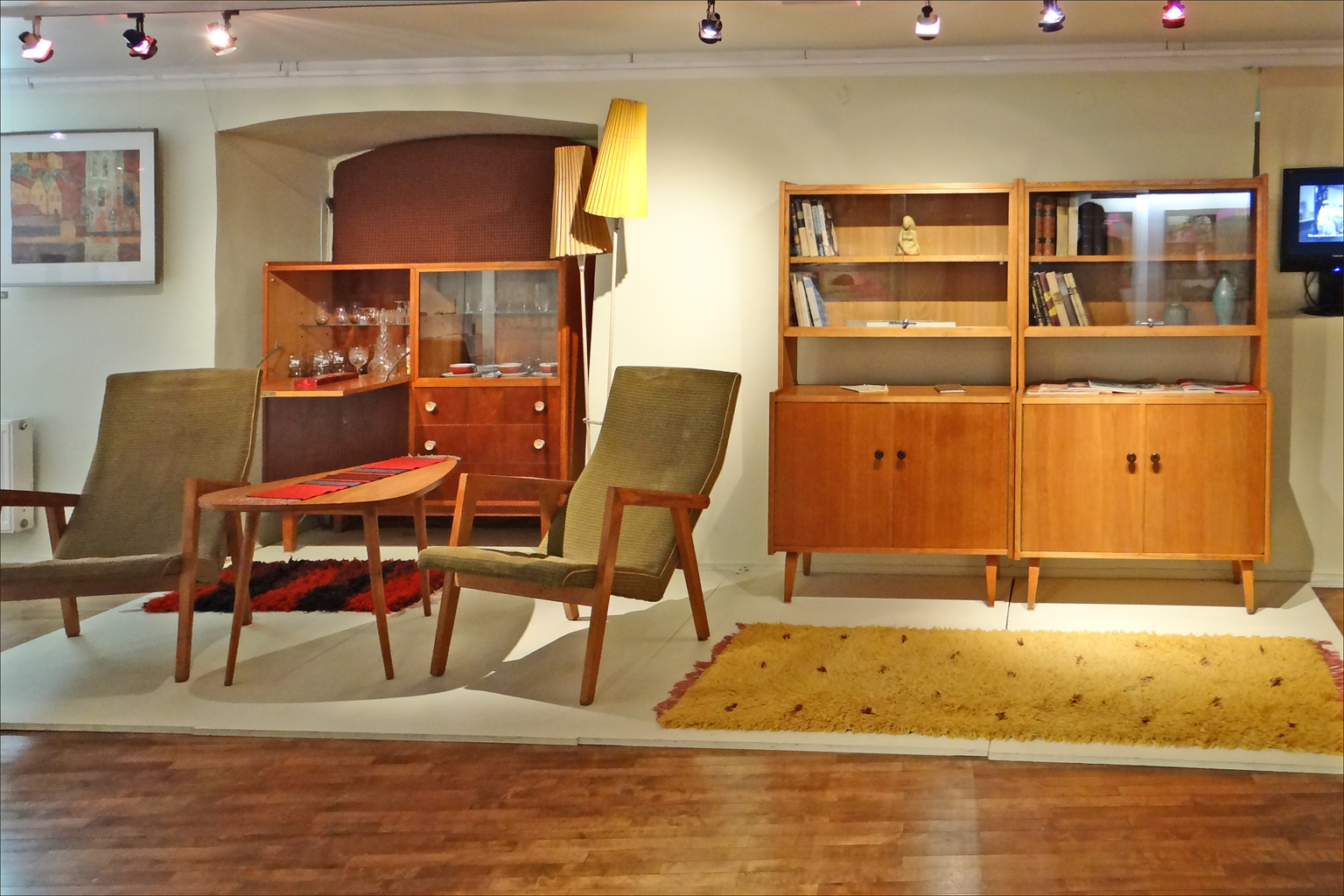
20th century furniture

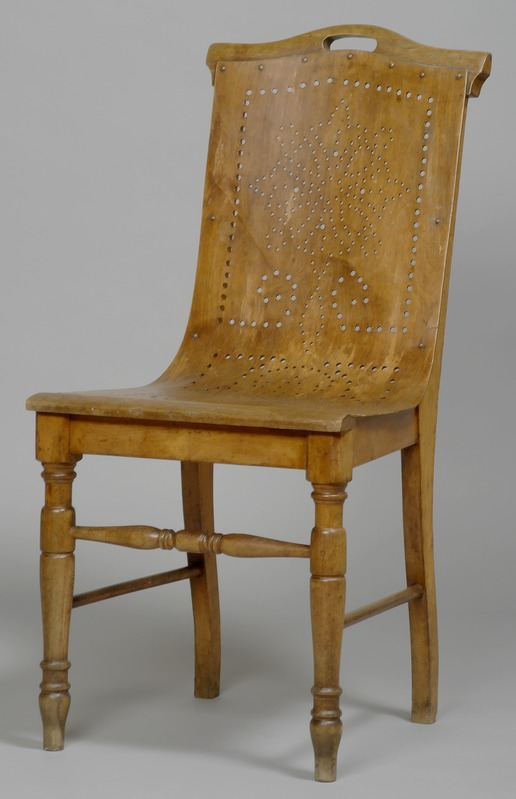
Wooden chair by the Luther factory

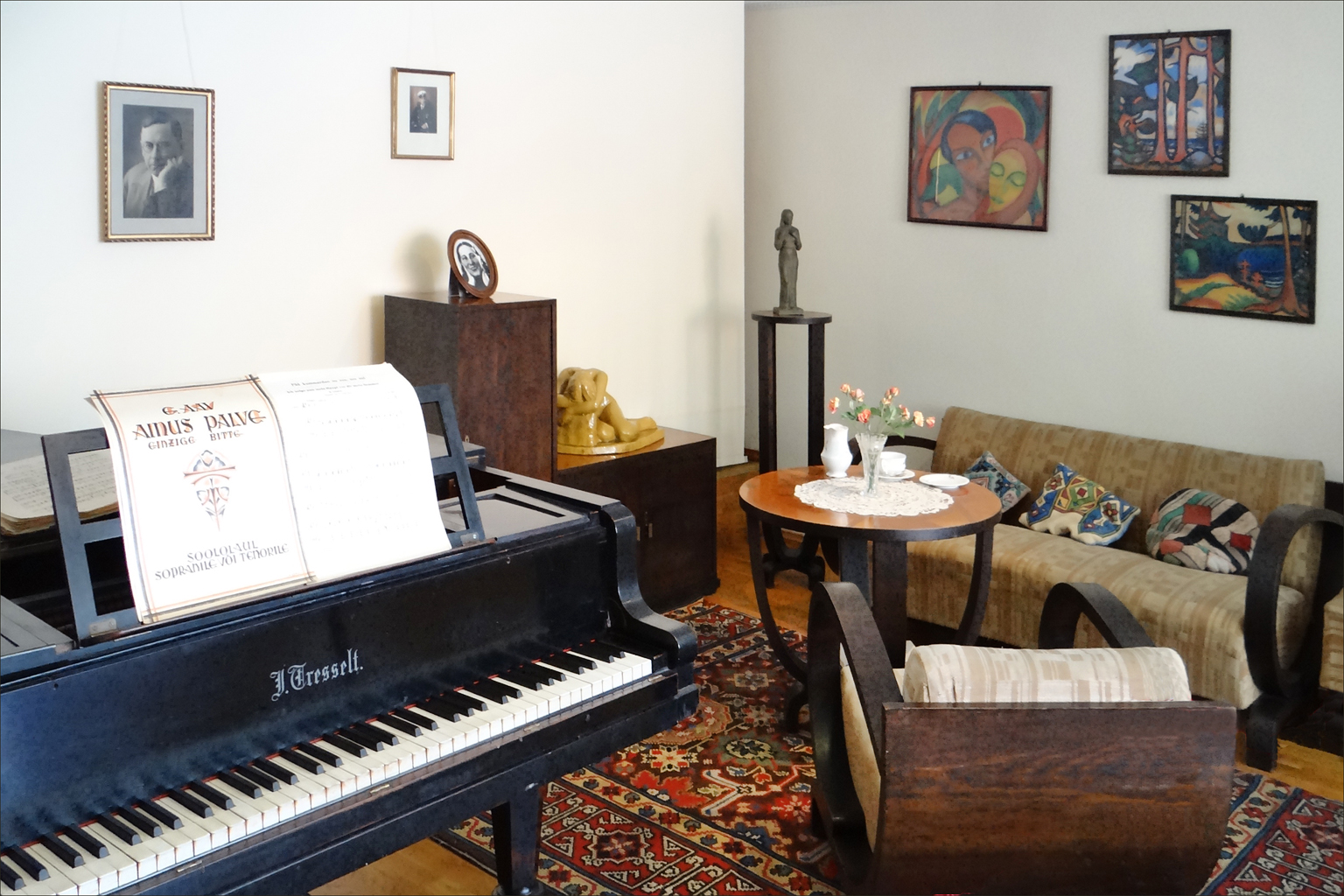
J. Tresselt piano

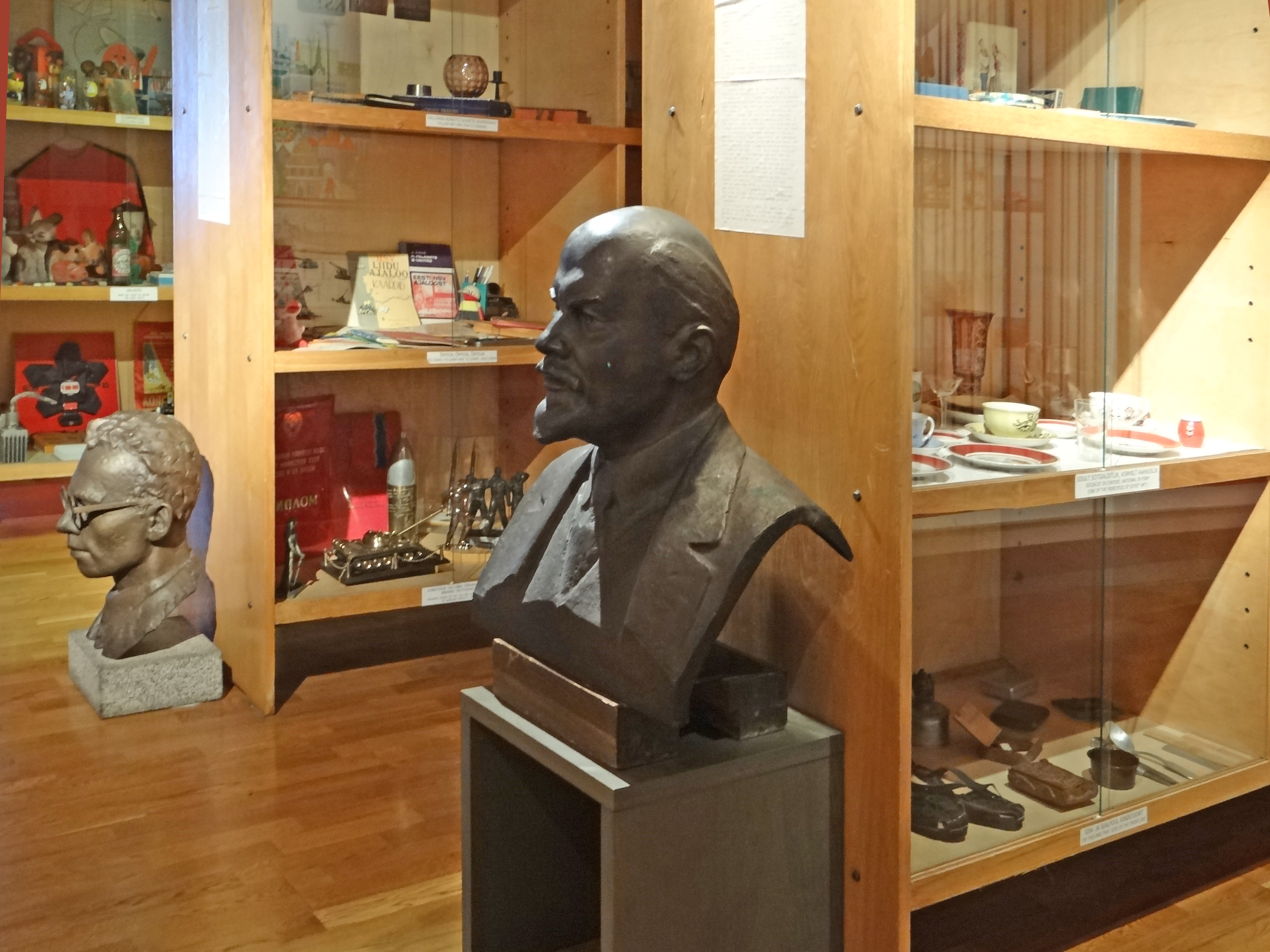
A bust of Vladimir Lenin

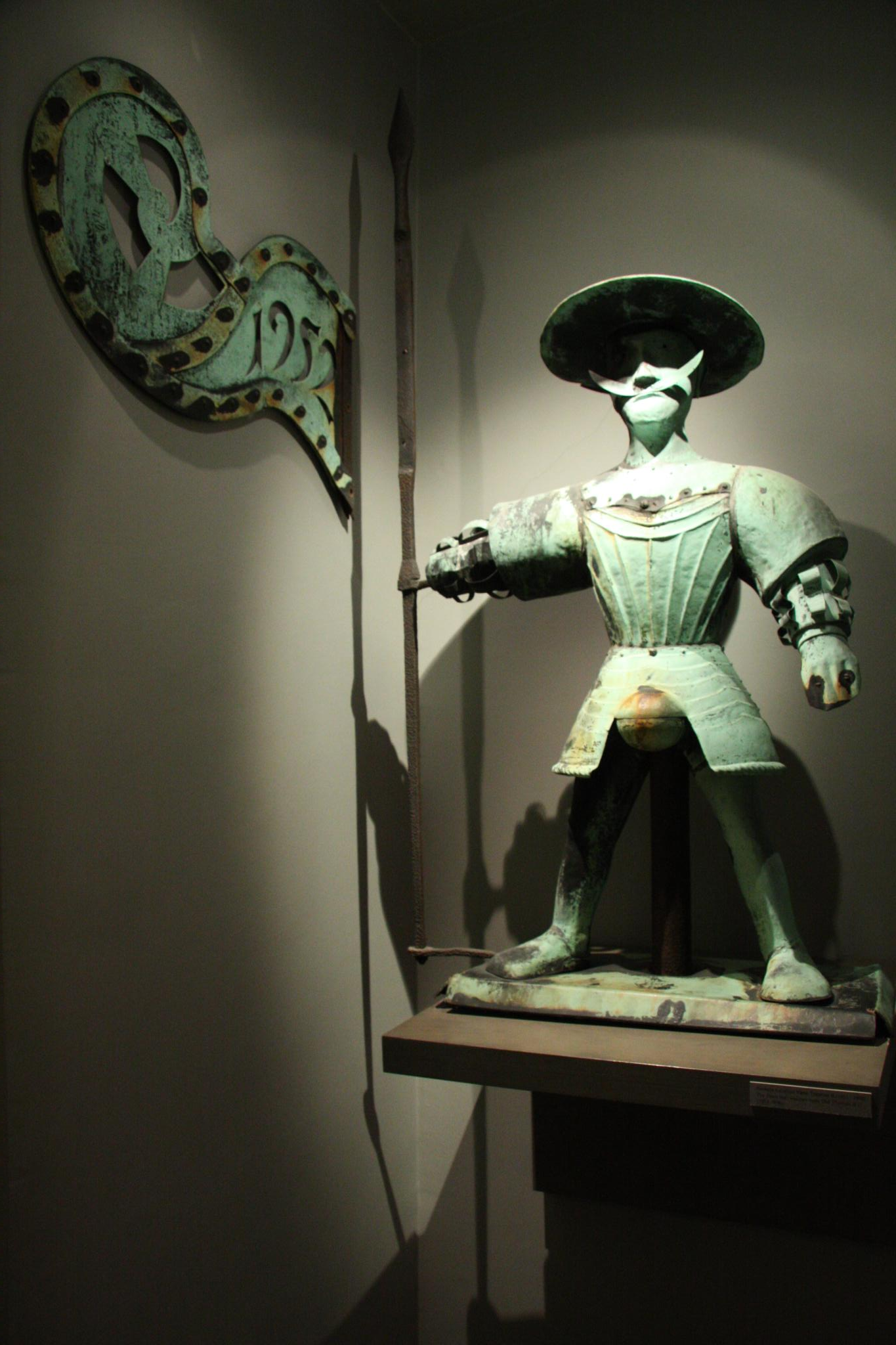
Soviet version of the Old Thomas

== Affiliate museums ==
The museum has several branches:

- Kiek in de Kök Fortifications Museum
- Children's museum Miiamilla
- City Museum
- Kalamaja Museum
- House of Peter the Great
- Museum of Photography
- People's Museum of Tallinn
- Anton Hansen Tammsaare Museum (former)
- Eduard Vilde Museum (former)
