= Väli =

Family name

Origin
- Language: Estonian
- Meaning: "field", "outdoor", "open space"
- Region of origin: Estonia

Other names
- Related names: Väljas

Väli is an Estonian surname meaning "field" and an "outdoor, open space" in nature. As of 1 January 2021, 382 men and 422 women in Estonian have the surname Väli. Väli is ranked as the 107th most common surname for men in Estonia, and 104th for women. The surname Väli is most common in Saare County, where 50.31 per 10,000 inhabitants of the county bear the surname.

Notable people bearing the Väli surname include:

- Arder Väli (born 1945), politician
- Ekke Väli (born 1952), sculptor
- Heino Väli (1928–1990), writer
- Hugo Väli (1902–1943), footballer
- Katrin Väli (born 1956), poet and translator
- Neeme Väli (born 1965), Major General of the Estonian Defence League
- Valdemar Väli (1909–2007), painter
- Velvo Väli (born 1974), actor
- Voldemar Väli (1903–1997), Greco-Roman wrestler
