= Kärt Jänes-Kapp =

Estonian research journalist and editor

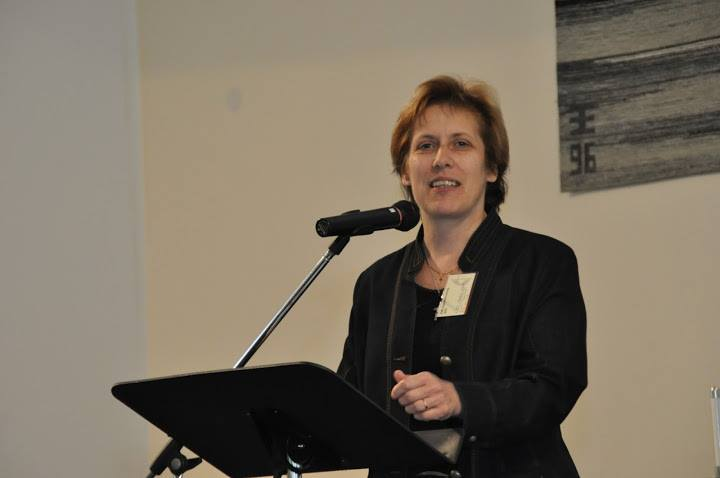
- Jänes-Kapp in the 2000s
- Born: Kärt Jänes; 9 January 1960
- Died: 10 September 2015 (aged 55); Tallinn, Estonia
- Resting place: Metsakalmistu
- Father: Harri Jänes

Kärt Jänes-Kapp (born Kärt Jänes; 9 January 1960 – 10 September 2015) was an Estonian research journalist and editor.

Jones-Kapp graduated from Tallinn 37th Secondary School in 1978 and in 1983 with a degree in history from the University of Tartu cum laude. During her university studies, she studied with other later prominent public figures such as Mart Laar, Lauri Vahtre, Küllo Arjakas, and Eero Medijainen.

In addition to university studies, she worked as a junior research fellow at the Estonian Academy of Sciences Institute of History from 1983 to 1989. Since 1989, she has been working at Horisont, at the beginning as a humanitarian assistant, and later as chief and executive editor. She was a member of the board of the Estonian Research Journalists' Association.

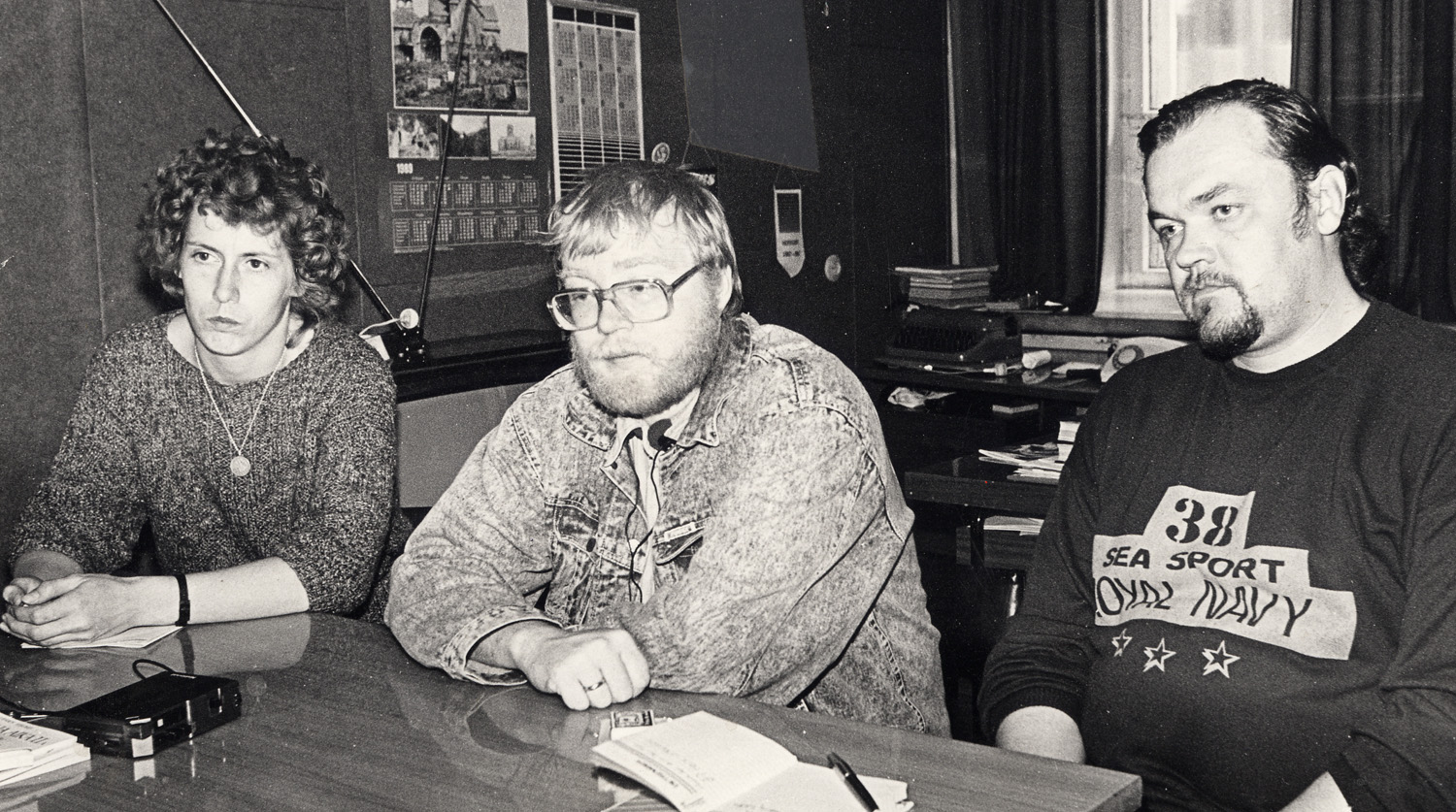
Kärt Jänes, Mart Laar and Hannes Walter at a discussion of ENE at Horisont magazine's headquarters in 1989.

Jänes-Kapp worked alongside the work of a research journalist from Koolibri in 2001, mainly teaching humanities and social science teaching materials. In addition, she completed her studies at the Hebrew University of Jerusalem and in the Master's program at the Estonian Institute of Demography.

Jänes-Kapp died on 10 September 2015 in Tallinn and was buried in Metsakalmistu.

== Personal life ==
Jänes-Kapps' father was a medical scientist, hygienist and popularist in medicine Harri Jänes.
