= Tartu War of Independence Monument =

Monument on Freedom Boulevard, Tartu, Estonia

- Tartu Vabadussõja mälestussammas
- Vabaduse puiestik, Tartu; Freedom Boulevard, Tartu
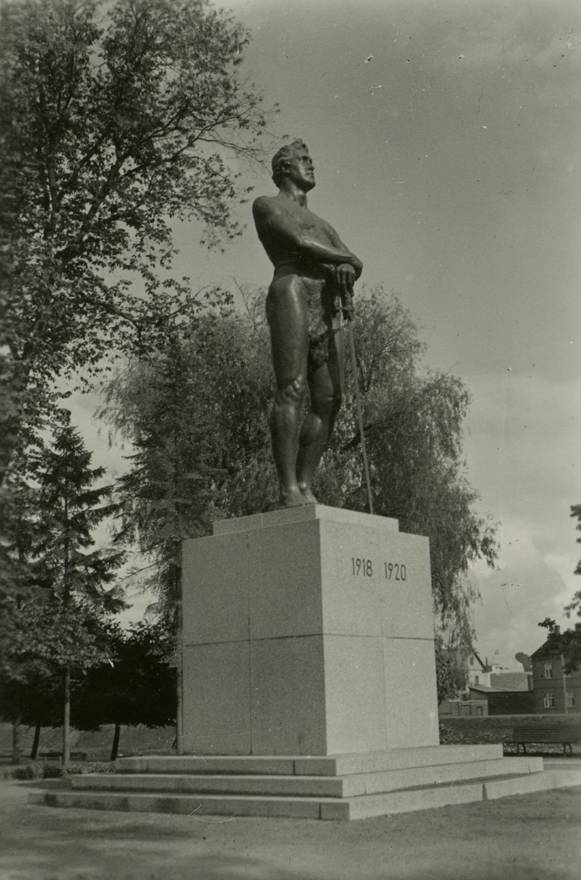
- For soldiers killed in action during the Estonian War of Independence between 1918 and 1920
- Established: September 17, 1933; June 22, 2003
- Removed: April 28, 1950
- Location: 58°22′58″N 26°43′28″E; Tartu, Estonia
- Designed by: Amandus Adamson, Ekke Väli
- 1918 1920

The Tartu War of Independence Monument (Estonian: Tartu Vabadussõja mälestussammas) is a memorial to the soldiers that fell in the Estonian War of Independence. It stands on Tartu's Freedom Boulevard (Estonian: Vabaduse puiestik).

It is a copy of the monument unveiled on September 17, 1933, and demolished by the Soviet authorities on April 28 (according to some reports April 29), 1950. Because people continued to bring flowers to the location after the original memorial was taken down, a monument to Friedrich Reinhold Kreutzwald was erected there in 1952.

The new memorial was unveiled at its former location on June 22, 2003. It is a cube on a granite base with steps, on which stands a bronze statue of Kalevipoeg—a copy of the original sculpture by Amandus Adamson. The sculptor Ekke Väli modeled it based on old photographs. Kalevipoeg is standing, looking ahead, leaning on his sword, and his lower body is covered by an animal skin. The years of the war are engraved on the pedestal: 1918–1920.

== Gallery ==
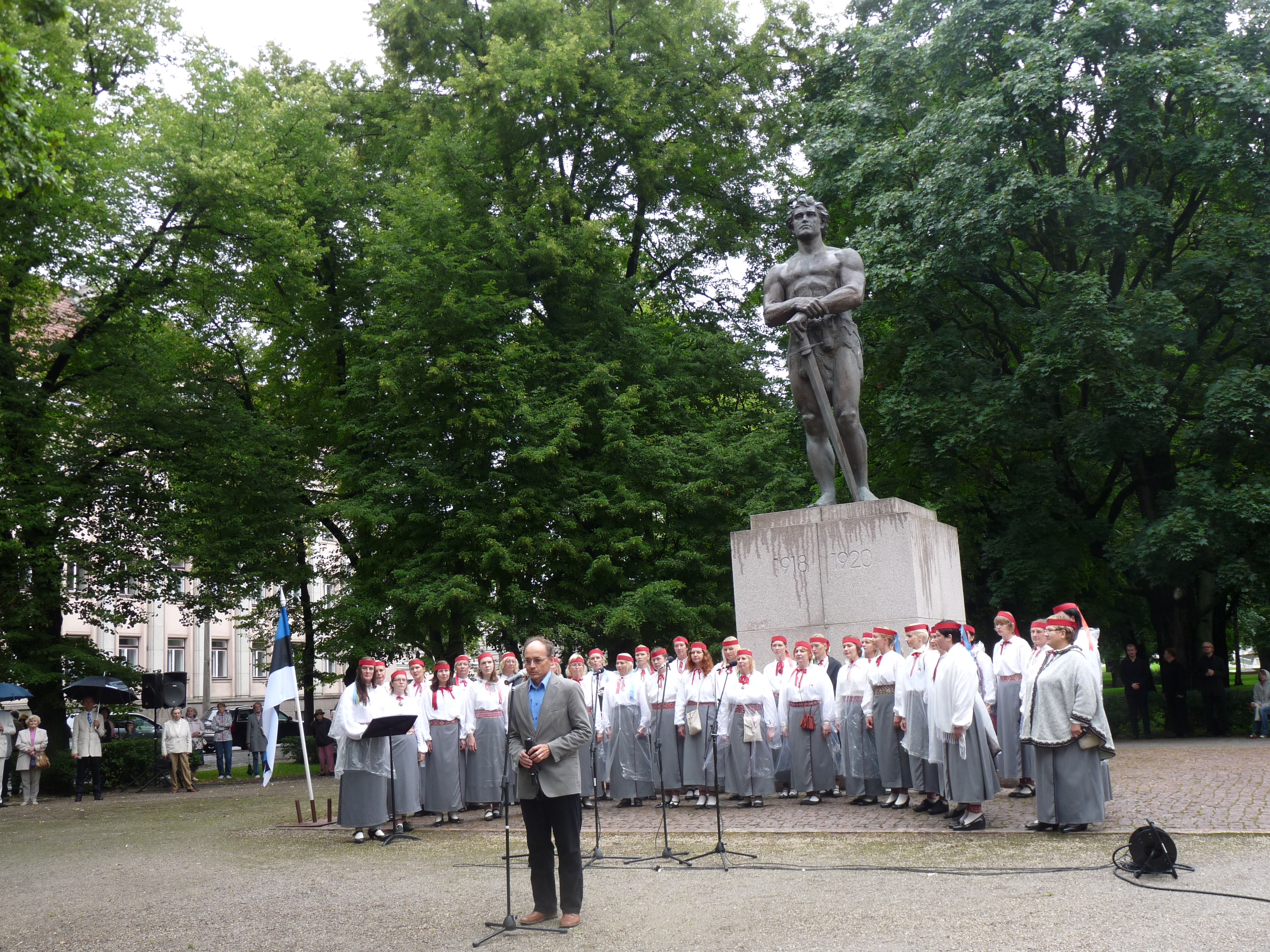
The historian Eero Medijainen speaking on Estonian Independence Day in front of the Tartu War of Independence Monument, behind him the female choir Emajõe Laulikud, August 20, 2012
