= Russian monitor Rusalka =

Imperial Russian Navy's Charodeika-class monitor

Coordinates: 59°51′55″N 24°53′07″E

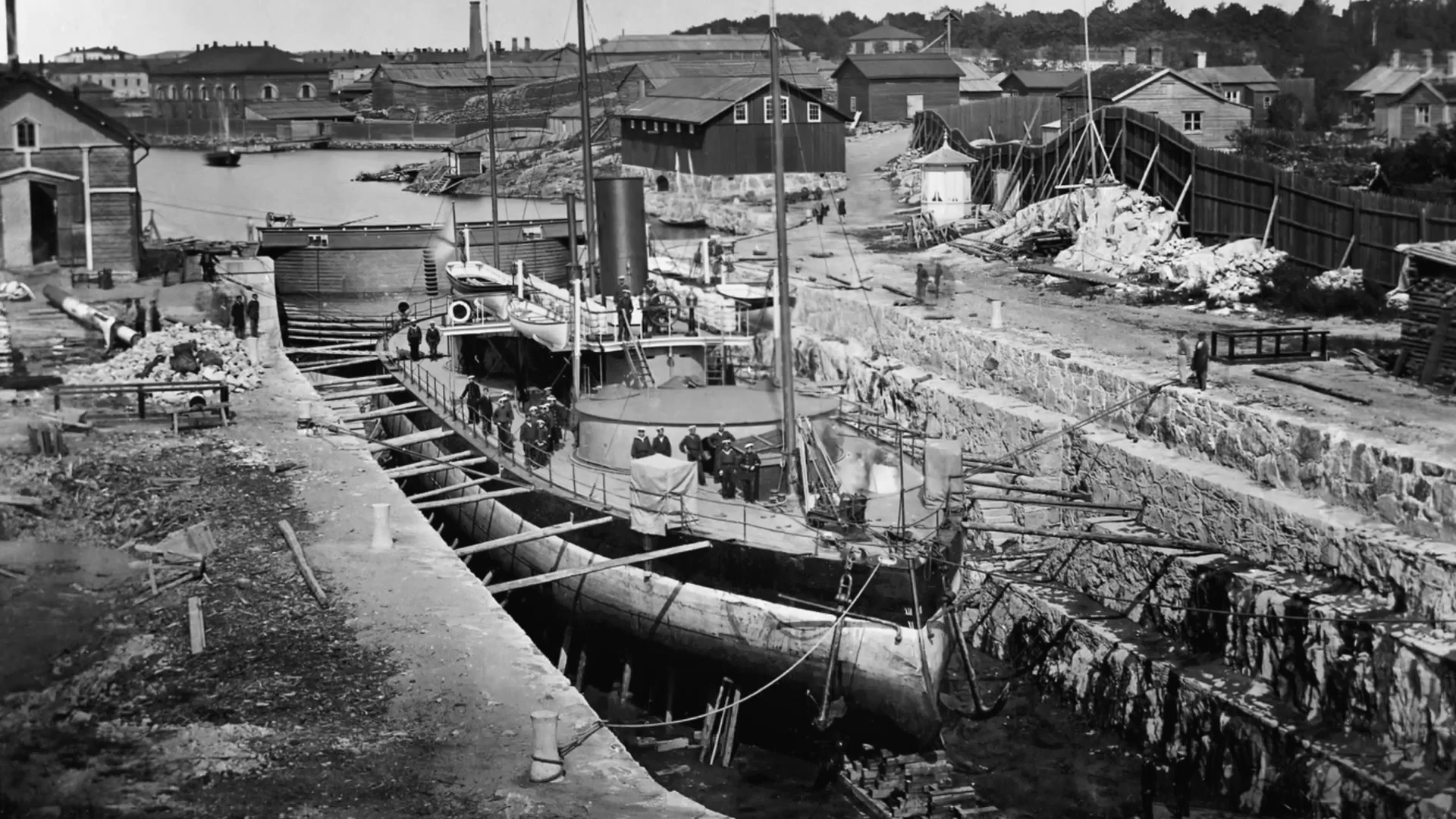
- Rusalka in drydock, 1868

History

Russian Empire
- Name: Rusalka
- Namesake: Rusalka
- Ordered: 26 January 1865 (Note: All dates used in this article are New Style)
- Builder: Admiralty Shipyard, St. Petersburg
- Cost: 762,000 rubles
- Laid down: 6 June 1866
- Launched: 12 September 1867
- In service: 1869
- Reclassified: As coast-defense ironclad, 13 February 1892
- Stricken: 26 October 1893
- Fate: Sank in the Gulf of Finland, 7 September 1893

General characteristics (as completed)
- Class & type: Charodeika-class monitor
- Displacement: 2,100 long tons (2,134 t)
- Length: 206 ft (62.8 m) (waterline)
- Beam: 42 ft (12.8 m)
- Draft: 12 ft 7 in (3.8 m)
- Installed power: 875 ihp (652 kW); 2 rectangular boilers
- Propulsion: 2 shafts, 2 Horizontal direct-action steam engines
- Speed: 8 knots (15 km/h; 9.2 mph)
- Complement: 172 officers and crewmen
- Armament: 2 × 9-inch (229 mm) Smoothbore guns; 2 × 15-inch (381 mm) Rodman guns
- Armor: Belt: 3.25–4.5 in (83–114 mm); Gun turrets: 5.5 in (140 mm); Conning tower: 4.5 in (114 mm); Deck: 1 in (25 mm)

Rusalka (Russian: Русалка, Mermaid), was one of two Charodeika-class monitors built for the Imperial Russian Navy in the 1860s. She served for her entire career with the Baltic Fleet. Aside from hitting an uncharted rock not long after she was completed in 1869, she had an uneventful career. Rusalka sank in a storm in 1893 with the loss of all hands in the Gulf of Finland. In 1902, a memorial was built in Reval (Tallinn) to commemorate her loss. Her wreck was rediscovered in 2003, bow-down in the mud, which has prompted a new theory regarding her loss.

== Design and description ==
Rusalka was 206 feet (62.8 m) long at the waterline. She had a beam of 42 feet (12.8 m) and a maximum draft of 12 feet 7 inches (3.8 m). The ship was designed to displace 1,882 long tons (1,912 t), but turned out to be overweight and actually displaced 2,100 long tons (2,100 t). Her crew numbered 13 officers and 171 crewmen in 1877.

The ship had two simple horizontal direct-acting steam engines, each driving a single propeller. The engines were designed to produce a total of 900 indicated horsepower (670 kW) using steam provided by two coal-fired rectangular fire-tube boilers, but only achieved 705 ihp (526 kW) and a speed of approximately 9 knots (17 km/h; 10 mph) during her sea trials. She carried a maximum of 250 long tons (254 t) of coal for her boilers.

Rusalka was initially armed with a pair of nine-inch (229 mm) rifled Model 1867 guns in the forward gun turret and a pair of fifteen-inch (381 mm) smoothbore Rodman guns in the aft turret. The Rodman guns were replaced by a pair of Obukhov 9-inch (229 mm) rifled guns in 1871 and all of the nine-inch guns were replaced in their turn by longer, more powerful nine-inch Obukhov guns in 1878–79. No light guns for use against torpedo boats are known to have been fitted aboard the ship before the 1870s when she received 3 four-pounder 3.4-inch (86 mm) guns mounted on the turret tops as well as a variety of smaller guns that included 45-millimeter (1.8 in) Engström quick-firing (QF) guns, 1-inch (25 mm) Nordenfelt guns, single-barreled QF 47-millimeter (1.9 in) Hotchkiss guns and QF 37-millimeter (1.5 in) Hotchkiss revolving cannon.

The ship had a complete waterline belt of wrought iron that was 4.5 inches (114 mm) thick amidships and thinned to 3.75 inches (95 mm) at the bow and 3.25 inches (83 mm) at the stern. The armor was backed by 12 to 18 inches (300 to 460 mm) of teak. The circular turrets were protected by armor 5.5 inches (140 mm) thick and the walls of the ship's oval conning tower were also 4.5 inches thick. Her deck was 1 inch (25 mm) thick amidships, but reduced to 0.25–0.5 inches (6.4–12.7 mm) at the ends of the ship.

== Construction and service ==
Rusalka, named after the mythological creature, was ordered on 25 January 1865 and construction began on 10 June at the Admiralty Shipyard, Saint Petersburg, although the formal keel-laying was not until 6 June 1866. She was launched on 12 September 1867 and completed in 1869 at the cost of 762,000 rubles. Construction was considerably delayed by late deliveries of drawings, material, and the death of her original builder. The ship struck an uncharted rock off the Finnish coast in June 1869 and damaged her bottom plating badly enough that she had to be run aground to prevent her from sinking. Rusalka served her entire career with the Baltic Fleet and was assigned to the Artillery Training Detachment in March 1870. The ship had her boilers replaced in 1878 and 1891 and she was reclassified as a coast-defense ironclad on 13 February 1892.

=== Sinking ===
Rusalka, under the command of Captain 2nd Rank V. Kh. Ienish sailed from Reval harbor at 08:30 on 7 September 1893, bound for Helsingfors (Helsinki). She was escorted by the gunboat Tucha (Russian: Туча, Cloud) under Captain 2nd Rank N. M. Lushkov. Several hours after their departure the weather deteriorated into a storm, with gale force winds and rain; Tucha lost her charge from sight around noon, but sailed on and arrived safely at Helsingfors.

No trace of the monitor was found until the corpse of a sailor in a dinghy and a few lifebuoys washed ashore on the Finnish island of Kremare. Extensive searches of the sea bottom also failed to locate the ship. In January 1894 a commission appointed to investigate convened and reprimanded Rear Admiral P. S. Burachek, commander of the detachment, for letting Rusalka go to sea in bad weather as well as Lushkov for losing contact with the monitor. The commission concluded that the ship's steering gear failed or that water had entered the ship and caused her to lose power. Either would have caused Rusalka to turn parallel to the waves where her superstructure would have been demolished and extensive flooding would have soon overwhelmed her small reserve of buoyancy. Whatever the cause, Rusalka obviously broached and sank with the loss of all 177 members of her crew.

=== Monument ===
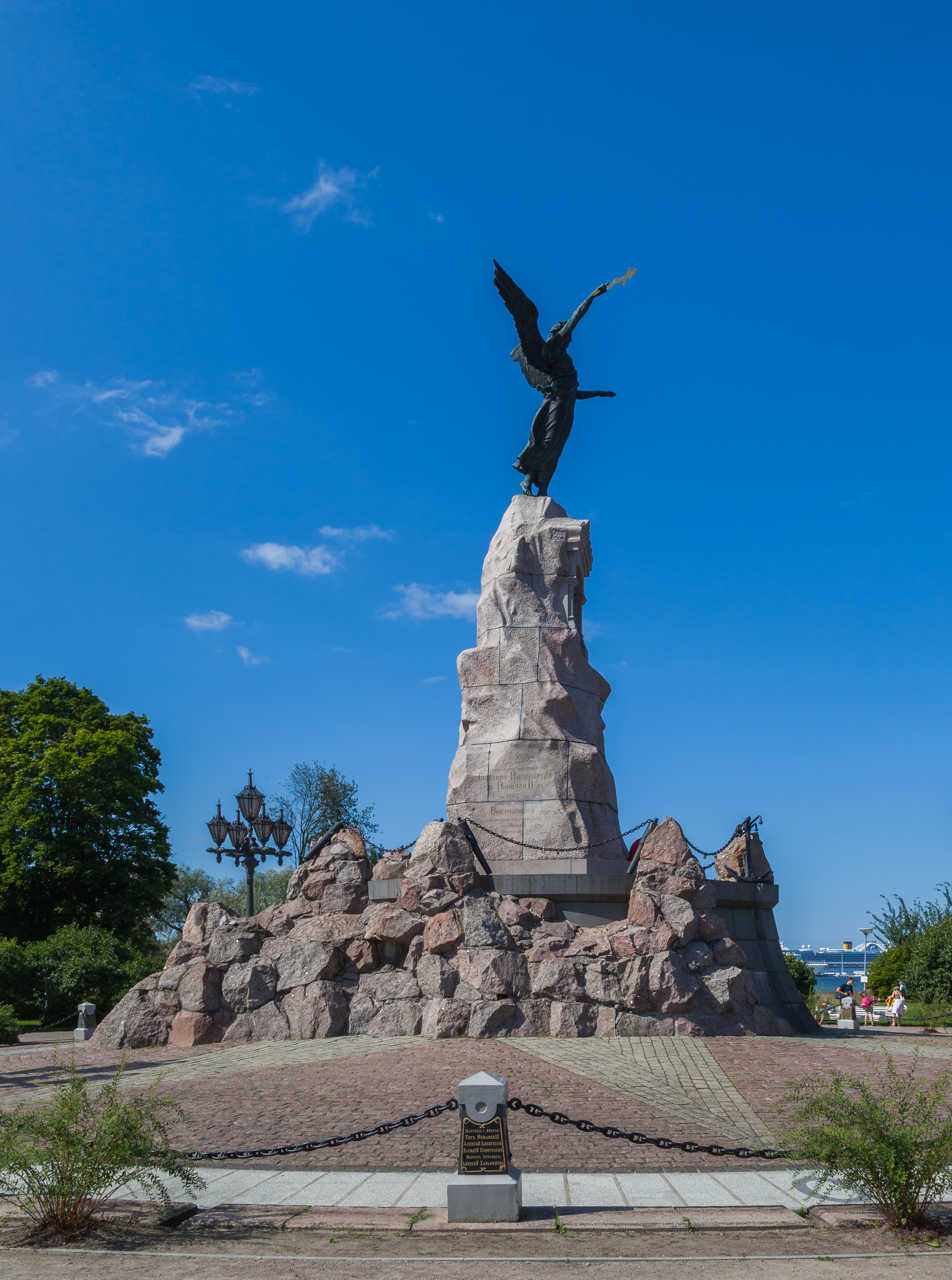
Side view of the monument in 2012

On 7 September 1902, the ninth anniversary of the loss of the ship, a monument to Rusalka (Estonian transliteration from Russian: Russalka) was erected in Tallinn. Sculpted by Amandus Adamson, it takes the form of a bronze angel standing on a granite pedestal.

=== Discovery ===
The wreck of Rusalka was claimed to have been found by divers of the Soviet EPRON salvage agency in 1932, but they made no attempt to salvage it. EPRON's location does not match that of the ship as discovered in 2003.

In spring 2003, a joint project was launched by the Estonian Maritime Museum and the commercial diving company Tuukritööde OÜ with the aim of finding Rusalka which had sunk 110 years earlier. On 22 July 2003 the wreck of Rusalka was located in the Gulf of Finland, 25 kilometers (16 mi) south of Helsinki, by the museum's research vessel Mare. Two days later, deep divers Kaido Peremees and Indrek Ostrat more precisely located and videoed the wreck. Most unusually, the wreck is in a near-vertical position; following her sinking, the vessel plunged, bow first, 74 meters (243 ft) directly downward into the muddy bottom of the gulf, and is buried in the bottom to almost half her length. The divers found the stern of the lost vessel rising 33 meters (108 ft) above the sea bed and her rudder turned to starboard.

The wreck is generally intact although draped with snagged fishing nets. The aft turret, however, has fallen out off the ship. The vertical position of the wreck has inspired a new theory of her loss by nautical archaeologist Vello Mäss. He believes that Rusalka was taking on water forward, perhaps from a leak or through ventilation hatches and was bow-heavy when her captain decided to make a turn, possibly to return to Reval, and the ship capsized during the turn with her engines still running. Her forward speed and flooded forward hull meant that she descended vertically and drove her hull into the muddy sea bottom.

== Bibliography ==
- Chesneau, Roger & Kolesnik, Eugene M., eds. (1979). Conway's All the World's Fighting Ships 1860–1905. Greenwich, UK: Conway Maritime Press. ISBN 0-8317-0302-4.
- McLaughlin, Stephen (2013). "Russia's Coles 'Monitors': Smerch, Rusalka and Charodeika". In Jordan, John (ed.). Warship 2013. London: Conway. pp. 149–63. ISBN 978-1-84486-205-4.
- Silverstone, Paul H. (1984). Directory of the World's Capital Ships. New York: Hippocrene Books. ISBN 0-88254-979-0.
