= Russian ship Dvienadsat Apostolov (1841) =

Ship of the line of the Russian Imperial Navy

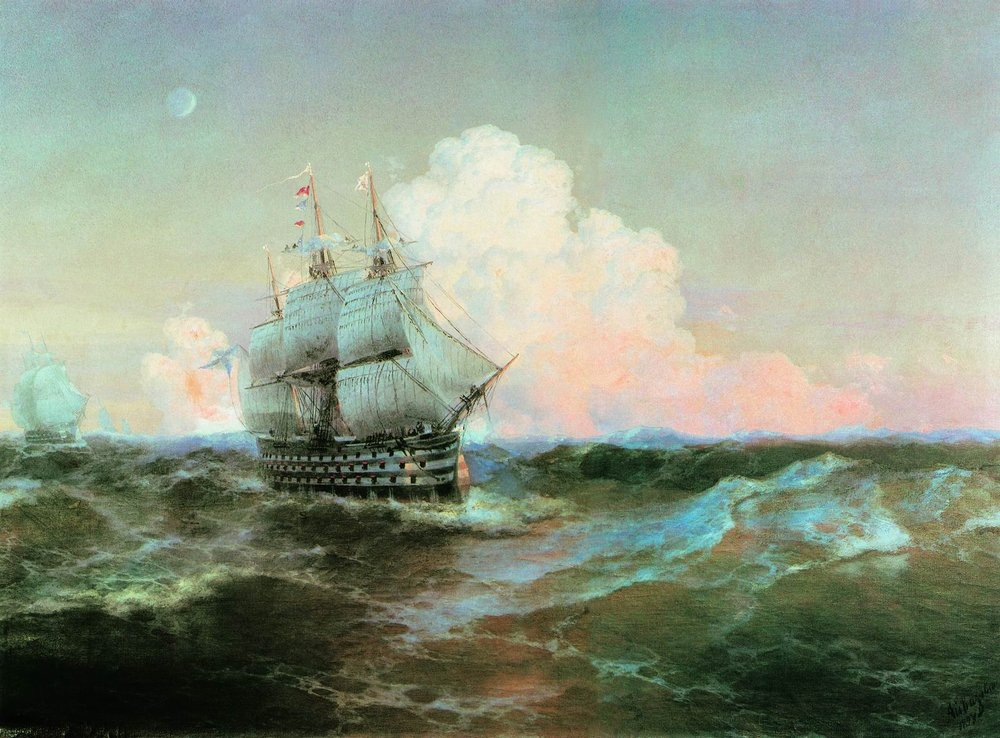
- A painting of Dvienadsat Apostolov by Ivan Aivazovsky (1878)

History

Russian Empire
- Name: Dvienadsat Apostolov
- Builder: S. I. Chernyavskiy, Nikolaev
- Laid down: 4 October 1838
- Launched: 15 July 1841
- Completed: 1842
- Fate: Scuttled at the Siege of Sevastopol, 25 February 1854

General characteristics (as built)
- Class & type: 120-gun Dvienadsat Apostolov-class ship of the line
- Displacement: 4,790 long tons (4,870 t)
- Tons burthen: 3,190 tons (bm)
- Length: 211 ft 2 in (64.36 m) (p/p)
- Beam: 59 ft 6 in (18.14 m)
- Draft: 25 ft 9 in (7.85 m)
- Armament: Lower gundeck: 28 × 68 pdr Paixhans guns; 4 × 36 pdr long guns; Middle gundeck: 34 × 36 pdr short guns; Upper gundeck: 34 × 36 pdr gunnades; Forecastle and quarterdeck: 24 × 24-pound gunnades; 1 × 24 pdr carronades; 2 × 12 pdr carronades; 2 × 8 pdr carronades

The Russian ship Dvienadsat Apostolov (Russian: Двенадцать Апостолов, lit. 'Twelve Apostles') was the lead ship of her class of three first rate ship of the line built for the Imperial Russian Navy. Completed in 1842, she served her whole career with the Black Sea Fleet. Dvienadsat Apostolov took part in the defence of Sevastopol during the Crimean War. Rather than facing the powerful Anglo-French fleet, her guns were landed to reinforce the landward fortifications and she was used as a hospital ship. On the night of 25/26 February 1854, she was one of the Russian ships that was sunk as a blockship in the northern bay of Sevastopol.

== Design and description ==
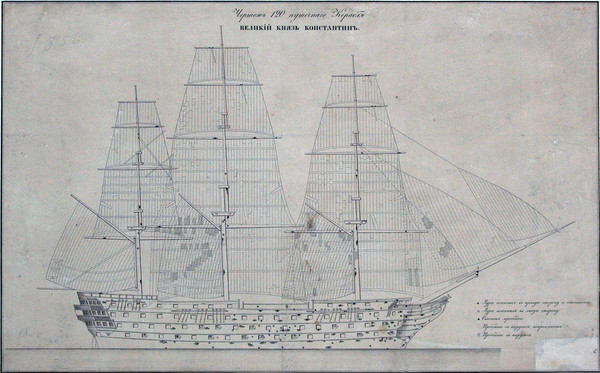
An 1853 drawing of sister ship Velikiy Kniaz Konstantin showing battle damage incurred at the Battle of Sinop.

The design of the Dvienadsat Apostolov-class was said to have been based on the 1839 British ship of the line, HMS Queen. The ship was 202 feet 8 inches (61.8 m) long between perpendiculars and measured 208 feet 9 inches (63.6 m) at the lower gundeck. She had a beam of 59 feet 6 inches (18.1 m) and a deep draught of about 25 feet 9 inches (7.8 m). (Note: The dimensions given here should be regarded as approximate as the sources used by naval historians John Tredea and Eduard Sozaev differ amongst themselves.) The ship displaced 4,790 long tons (4,870 t) and measured 3,190 tons bm.

Her modern main armament of 28 Paixhans guns, designed to fire a 68 lb (31 kg) explosive shell and located on the lower gundeck; these had been introduced into the Russian Navy in 1838 and were based on the latest British and French designs. Also on that deck were located four 36-pounder long guns. The armament of the middle gundeck consisted of thirty-four short 36-pounder guns, while the upper gundeck was fitted with thirty-four 36-pounder gunnades. Distributed between the forecastle and quarterdeck were twenty-four 24-pounder gunnades, and a variety of carronades: one 24-pounder, two 12-pounders and a pair of 8-pounders.

== Service history ==
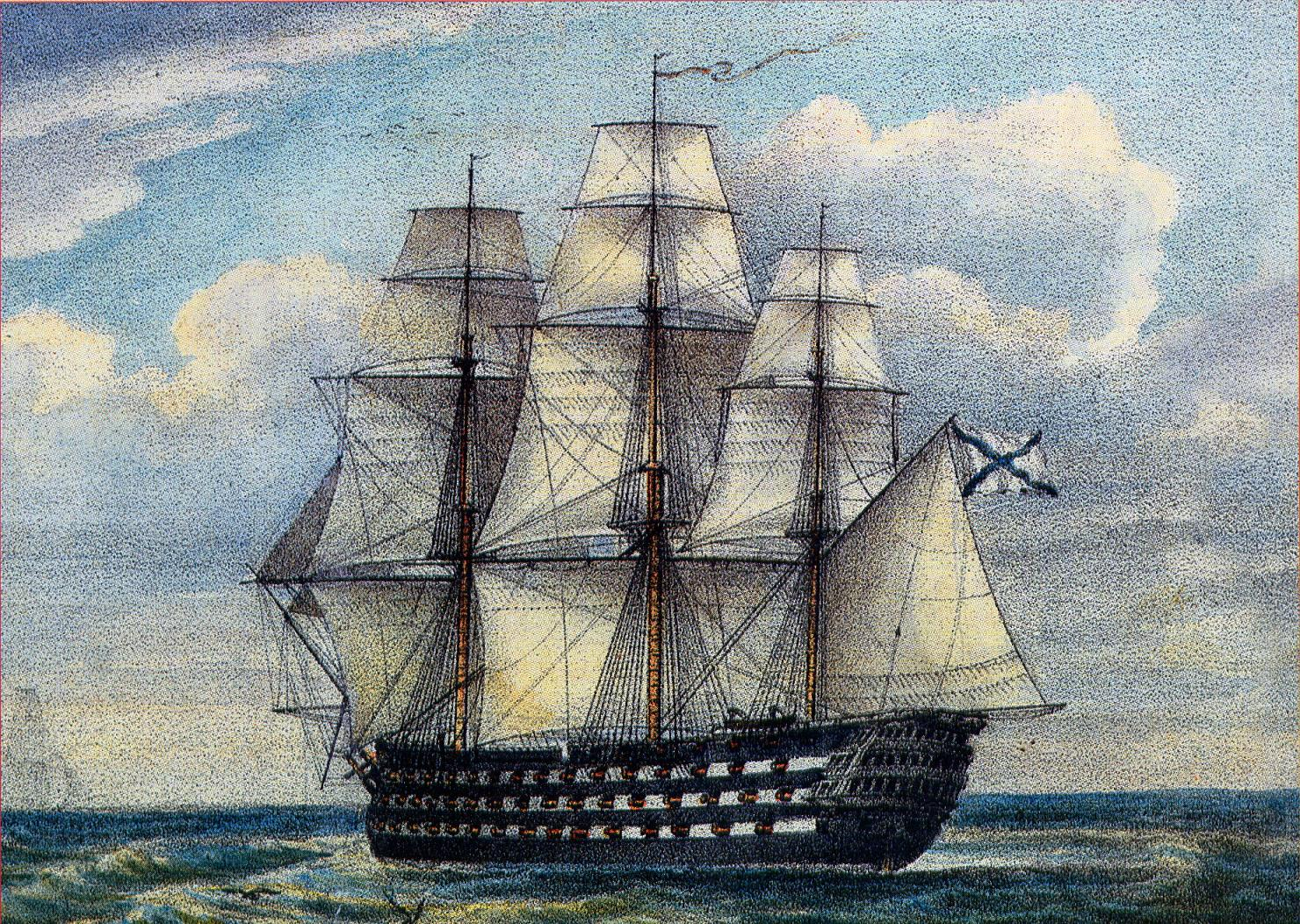
A depiction of Dvienadsat Apostolov by Vasiliĭ Aleksandrovich Prokhorov (1818-1882)

Dvienadsat Apostolov was laid down on 4 October 1838 at the Nikolaev (modern Mykolaiv) shipyard of S. I. Chernyavskiy and was launched on 15 July 1841. Her first voyage was from Nikolaev to the main Black Sea Fleet base Sevastopol in 1842, followed by a cruise in the Black Sea. Her first commander was Captain Vladimir Kornilov (1806-1854), who later became an admiral. In 1843, Dvienadsat Apostolov helped to transport the 13th Infantry Division from Sevastopol to Odessa and then return them. She took part in further cruises in the Black Sea between 1843 and 1847 and between 1849 and 1850. She underwent a refit from 1851 to 1852, during which her carronades were removed.

In October 1853, she transported 1,466 Russian troops from Sevastopol to Sukhum Kale (modern Sukhumi in Georgia), where the outbreak of the Crimean War had reignited the Russo-Circassian War. Returning to Sevastopol in April 1854, she participated in the defence of the port by being listed over to one side, so that her main guns could engage the British positions on the hills overlooking the harbour; other guns were landed with their crews to establish an onshore artillery battery named after the ship, located between the Panaitova ravine and Hollandia Bay to the west of the town. All of her guns had been landed by December 1854, leaving only 80 sailors aboard to convert her into a temporary hospital ship, which was completed on 18 December. Dvienadsat Apostolov was scuttled on 13 February 1855 as part of a line of blockships to prevent the Anglo-French fleet from entering the harbour.

The Russian naval jack, believed to have been taken from the Dvienadsat Apostolov, in the collection of the National Maritime Museum in Greenwich.

A Russian naval jack, believed to have been taken from the ship by Henry Keppel, is in the collection of the National Maritime Museum in Greenwich. Following the end of hostilities, an American salvage engineer, John Gowen, was contracted by the Russian government to recover the sunken vessels and clear the Savastopol roadstead for navigation. Work commenced in the summer of 1857 and continued into 1862. Although some valuable steamships were salvaged, it proved impossible to lift any of the large wooden warships, which were firmly embedded in silt and heavily damaged by the shipworm Teredo navalis. It was found that these ships could only be removed by the use of explosives. In the summer of 1862, Tsar Alexander II and Grand Duke Konstantin Nikolayevich visited Sevastopol to see the cleared harbour and thank Gowen for his work, but because of his failure to raise any of the major warships, Gowan was never paid and his equipment was confiscated. In 1905, the Monument to the Sunken Ships was erected in Sevastapol Harbour on the 50th anniversary of the siege, to commemorate the scuttling of the Black Sea Fleet.

== Bibliography ==
- Dowling, Timothy C. (2014). Russia at War: From the Mongol Conquest to Afghanistan. Santa Barbara, California: ABC-CLIO. ISBN 978-1-59884-947-9.
- Fletcher, Ian & Ishchenko, Natalia (2008). The Battle of the Alma 1854: First Blood to the Allies in the Crimea. Barnsley, UK: Pen & Sword Military. ISBN 978-1-84415-672-6.
- Melvin, Mungo (2017). Sevastopol's Wars: Crimea from Potemkin to Putin. Oxford: Osprey Publishing. ISBN 978-1472807946.
- Tredrea, John & Sozaev, Eduard (2020). Russian Warships in the Age of Sail 1696–1860: Design, Construction, Careers and Fates. Barnsley, UK: Seaforth Publishing. ISBN 978-1-84832-058-1.
