= Russalka Memorial =

Monument in Tallinn, Estonia

Coordinates: 59°26′36.19″N 24°47′38.30″E

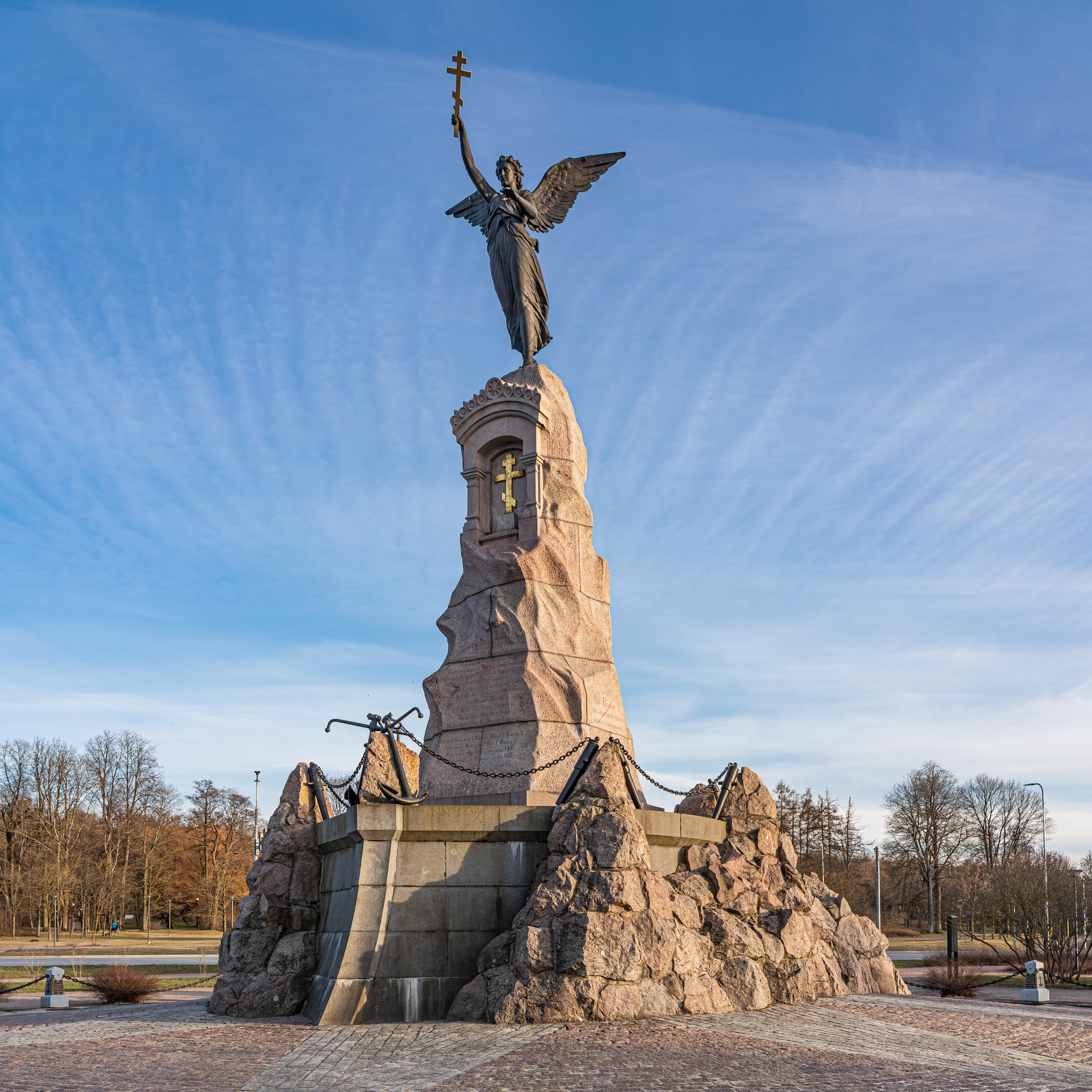
Russalka Memorial

Russalka Memorial (Estonian: Russalka mälestussammas) is a bronze monument sculpted by Amandus Adamson, erected on 7 September 1902 in Kadriorg, Tallinn, Estonia (then part of the Russian Empire) to mark the ninth anniversary of the sinking of the Russian warship Rusalka, or "Mermaid", which sank en route to Finland in 1893. It was the first monument in Estonia made by an Estonian sculptor. The monument depicts an angel holding an Orthodox cross towards the assumed direction of the shipwreck. The model for the angel was the sculptor's housekeeper.

In 2005, Eesti Post, the national postal service company, issued a postage stamp series for the 150th anniversary of the sculptor Amadus Adamson, with the Russalka Memorial depicted on the cover.

== Gallery ==
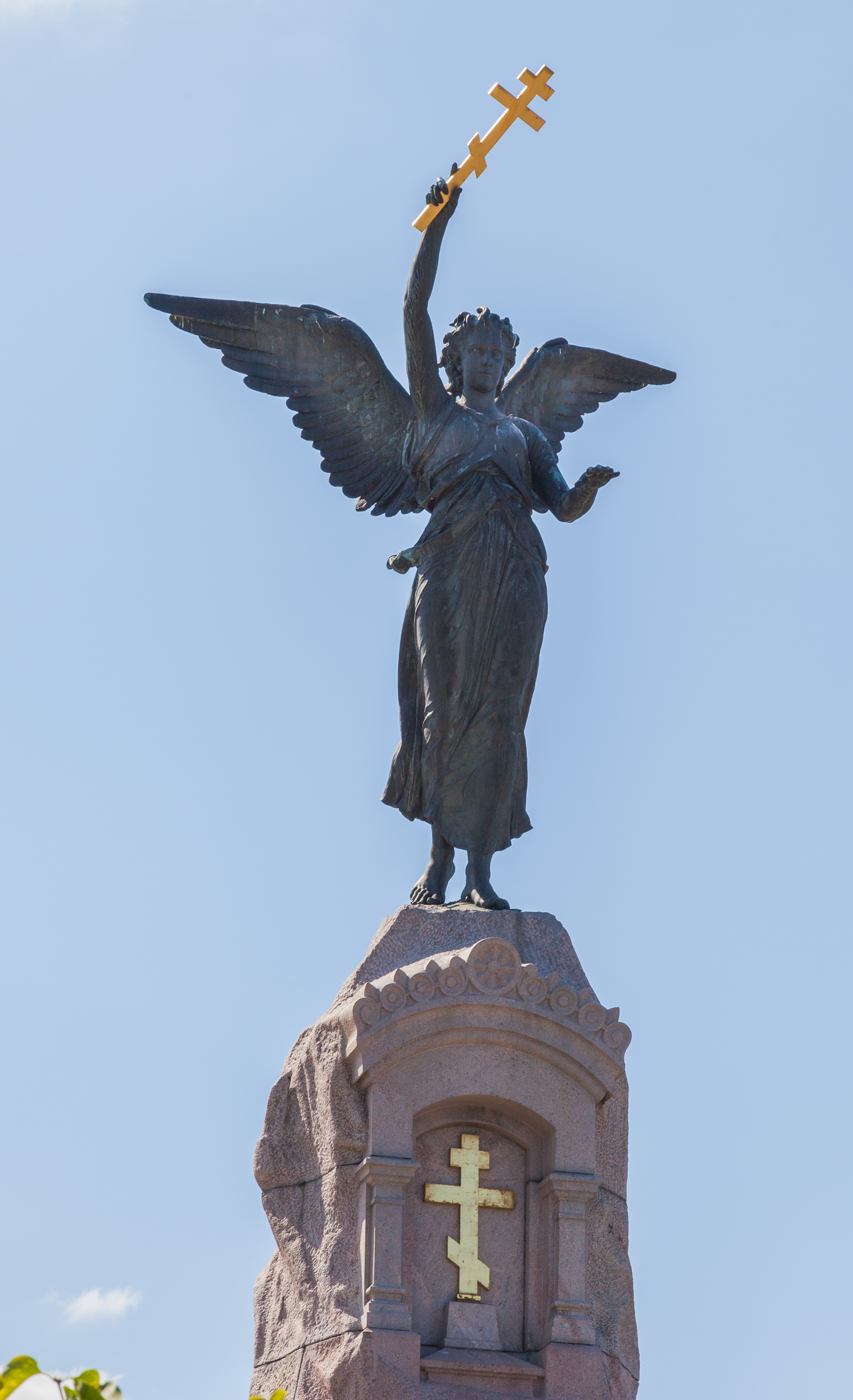
Russalka Memorial against the summer sky

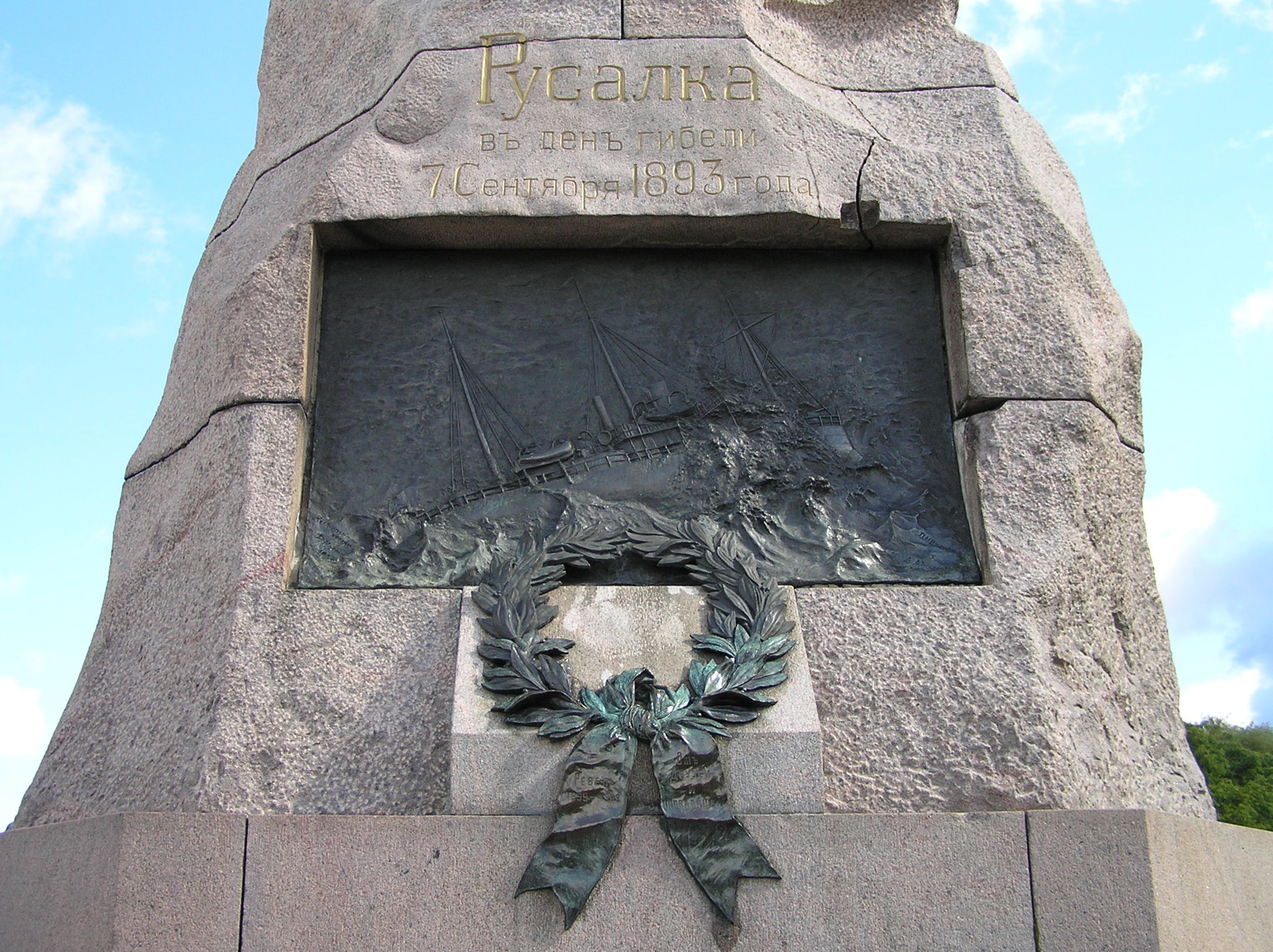
Sailors of the battleship Rusalka

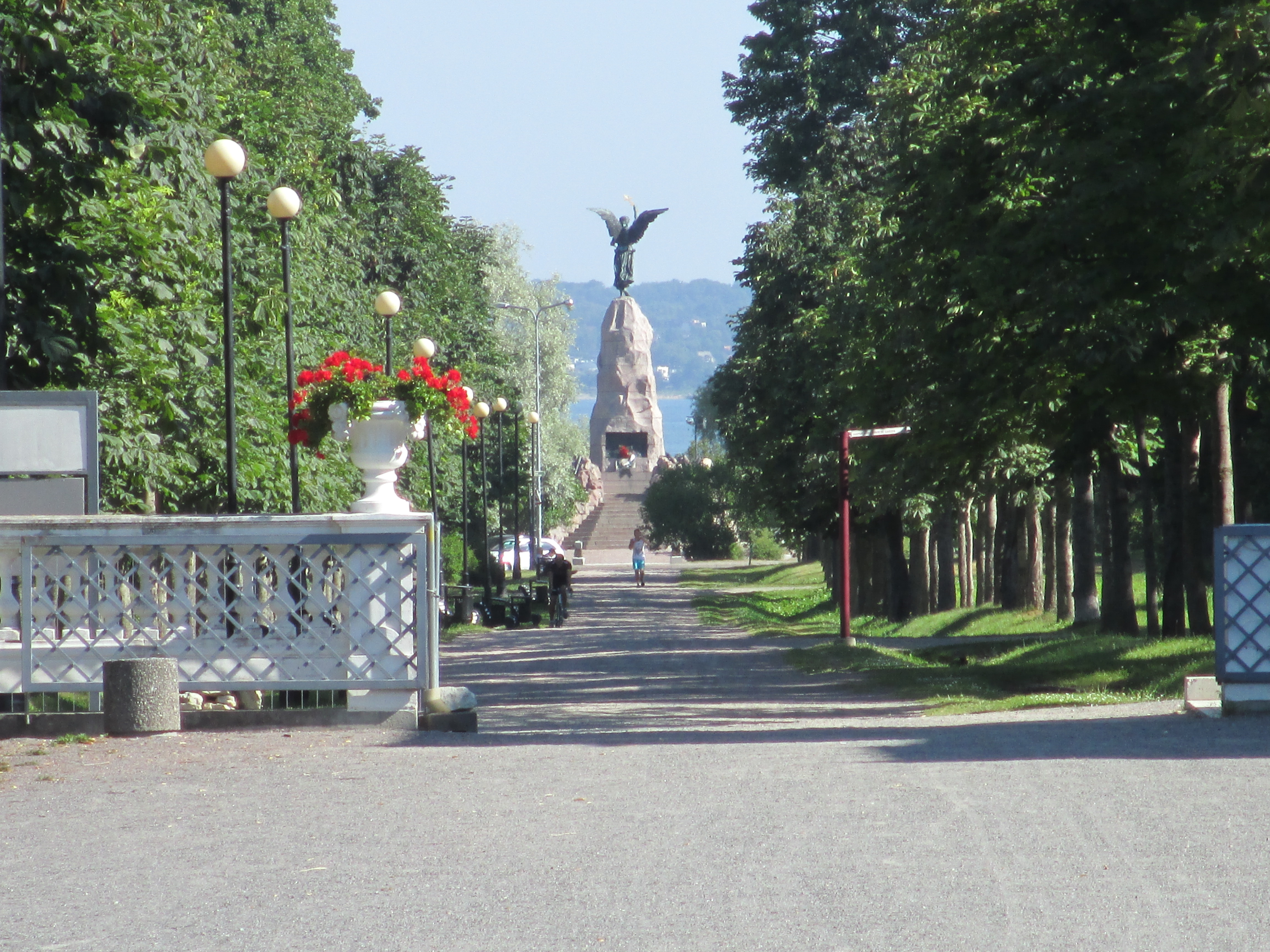
View from Kadriorg Park

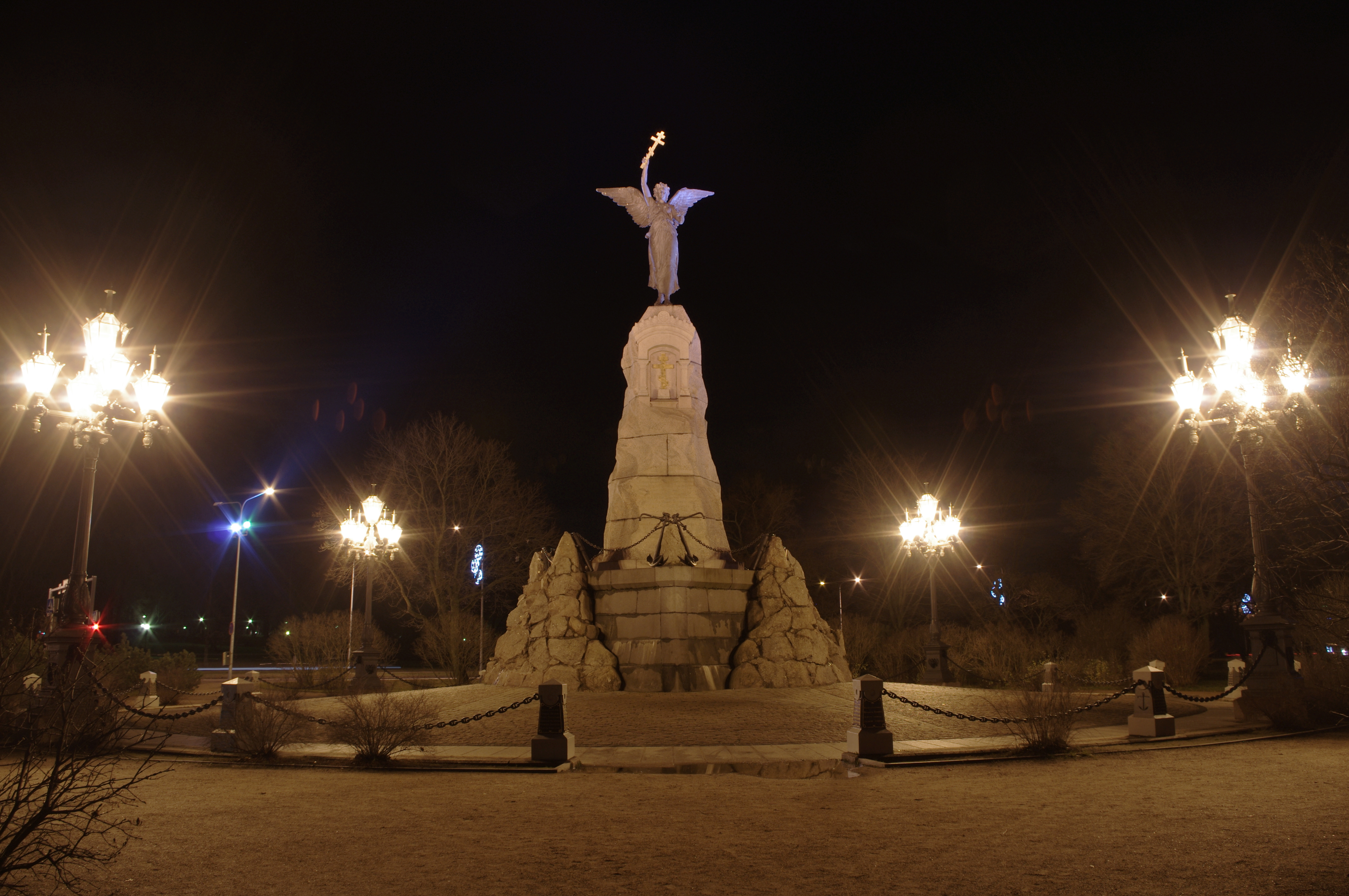
Memorial at night
