= Ekke Väli =

Estonian sculptor (born 1952)

- Born: April 19, 1952 (age 74); Tallinn, then part of Estonian SSR, Soviet Union
- Education: State Art Institute of the Estonian SSR
- Occupation: Sculptor

Ekke Väli (born April 19, 1952) is an Estonian sculptor.

He graduated from the State Art Institute of the Estonian SSR (ERKI) as a sculptor in 1979. He is a member of the Estonian Artists' Association.

== Awards and recognitions ==
- 1991: Kristjan Raud Art Award for Monument monumendile (Monument to a Monument), 1990
- 2009: Anton Starkopf Fellowship
- 2017: Aino Kallas Award

== Works ==
- 1988: Bust of Viktor Kingissepp at 14 Karu Street in Tallinn
- 1991: Paul Keres Memorial on Tõnismägi Street in Tallinn
- 2003: Replica of the Tartu War of Independence Monument destroyed by the Soviet authorities: Amandus Adamson's Kalevipoeg sculpture
- 2004: Gustav Ernesaks Statue at the Tallinn Song Festival Grounds
- 2008: Peeter Põld Monument in front of the Ministry of Education and Research in Tartu
- 2018: Statue of Artur Sirk in Ambla
- 2019: Statue of Karl Kikas in Põlva

== Family ==
Väli is the brother of the surgeon Toomas Väli.
