= Monument to the Sunken Ships =

- Памятник затопленным кораблям Пам'ятник затопленим кораблям
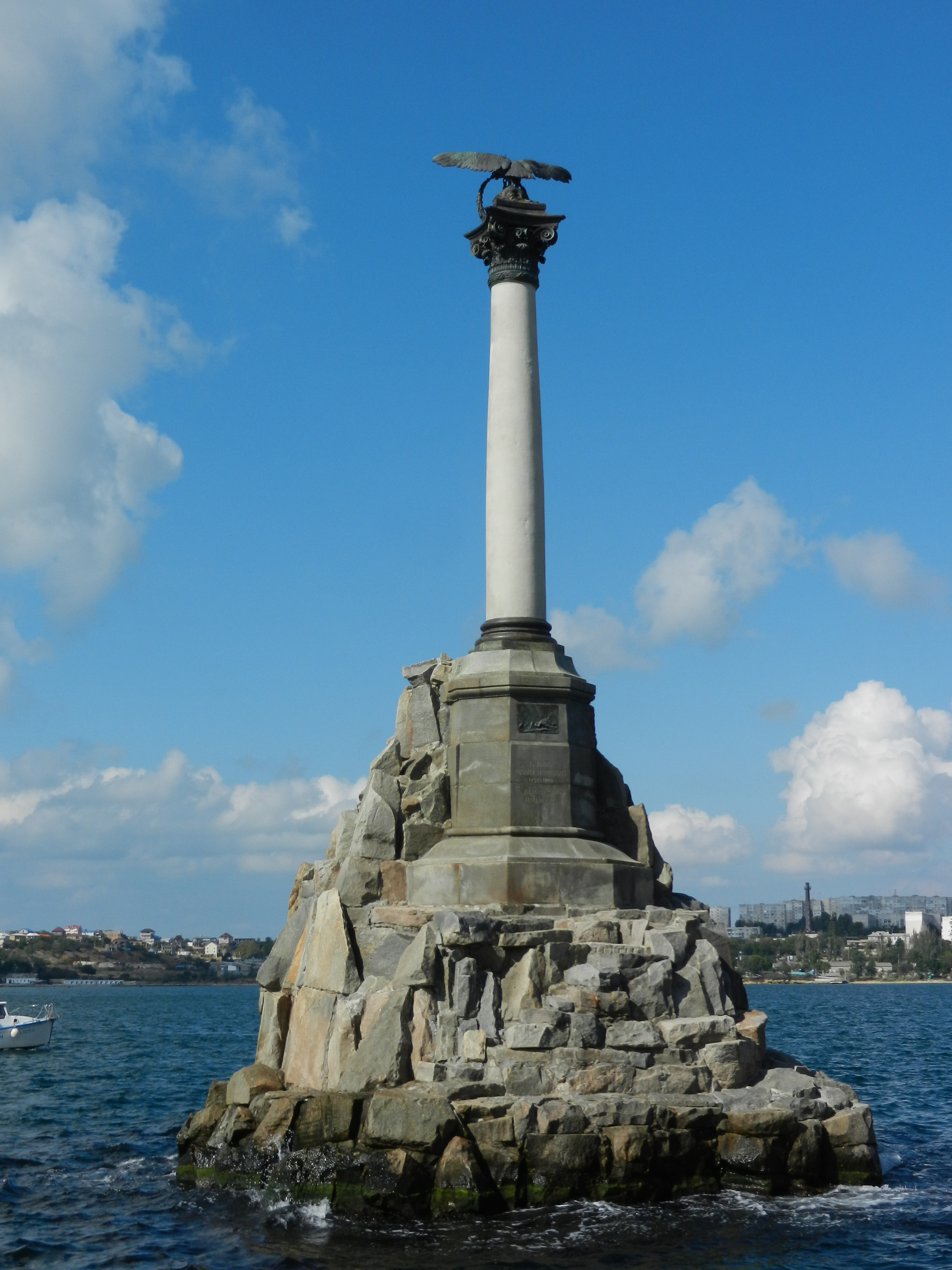
- Location: Sevastopol, Crimea
- Coordinates: 44.618388°N 33.524263°E
- Designer: Amandus Adamson
- Type: Monument
- Material: Granite and Bronze
- Height: 16.7 m (55 ft)
- Opening date: 1905
- Dedicated to: Imperial Russian Navy ships destroyed during the Siege of Sevastopol

Immovable Monument of National Significance of Ukraine
- Official name: Пам'ятник затопленим кораблям (Monument to the Sunken Ships)
- Type: Monumental Art
- Reference no.: 270010-Н

The Monument to the Sunken Ships (Russian: Памятник затопленным кораблям, romanized: Pamyatnik zatoplennym korablyam; Ukrainian: Пам'ятник затопленим кораблям, romanized: Pamiatnyk zatoplenym korabliam) is the symbol of the city of Sevastopol, on the disputed Crimean peninsula. Located in Sevastopol Bay, it was designed by Amandus Adamson and built by Valentin Feldmann in 1905.

== History ==
The monument was erected in 1905 on the 50th anniversary of the Siege of Sevastopol, during the Crimean War, in which many ships of the Imperial Russian Navy were scuttled, most of them part of the Black Sea Fleet.

== Symbol of the city ==
On 12 February 1969, the monument was included in the coat of arms of Sevastopol, and on 12 April 2000 in the flag of Sevastopol.

Flag of Sevastopol.

Coat of arms of Sevastopol.

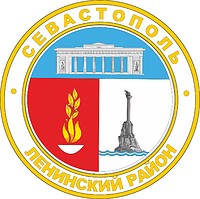
Coat of arms of Lenin District of Sevastopol.

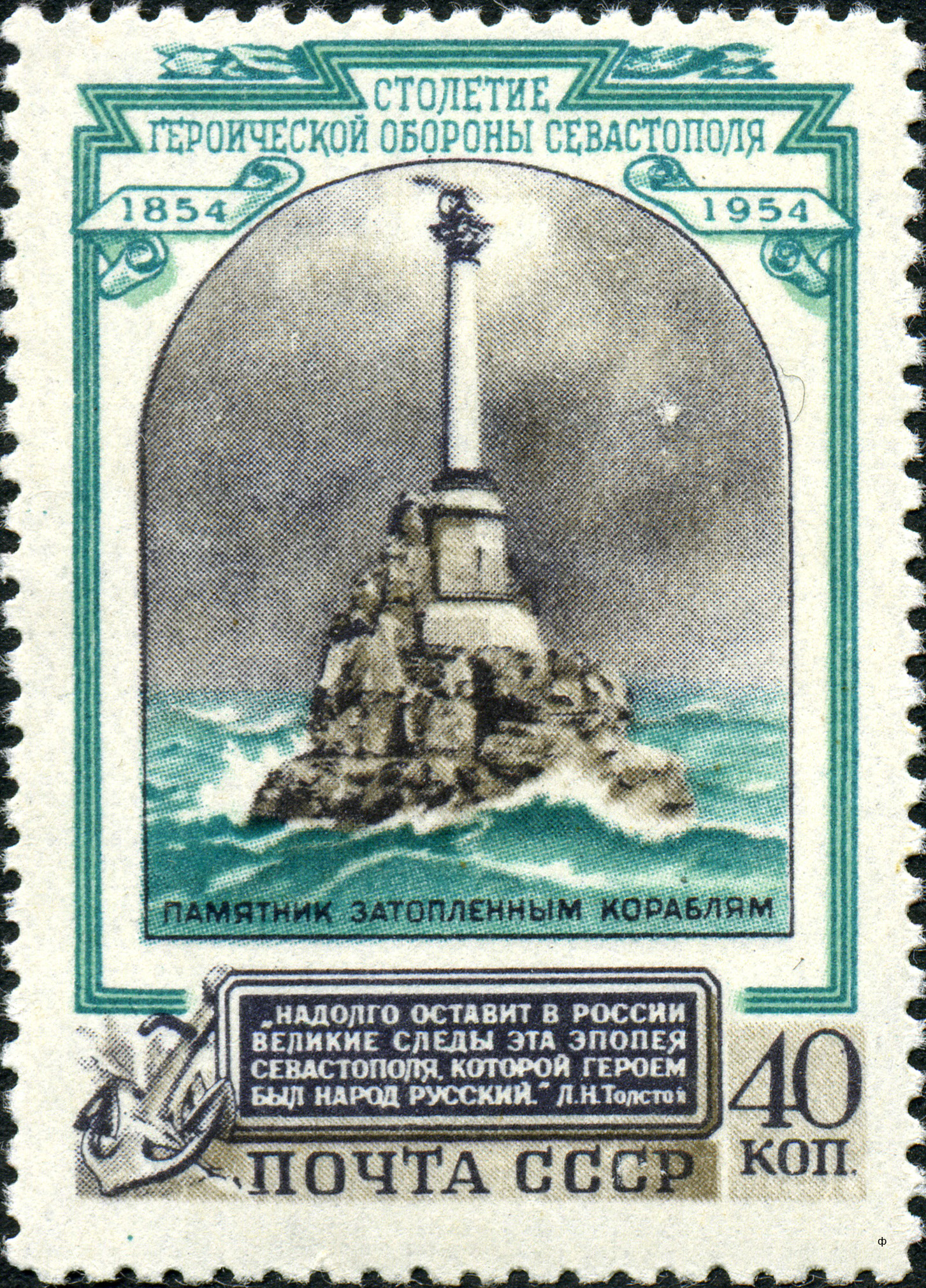
Soviet stamp "Centenary of the Siege of Sevastopol".

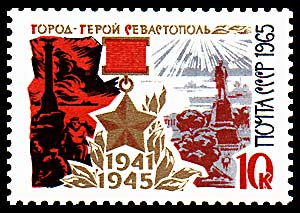
Soviet stamp "Hero City of Sevastopol".

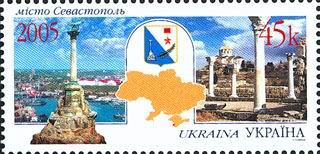
Ukrainian stamp from "Regions of Ukraine" series.

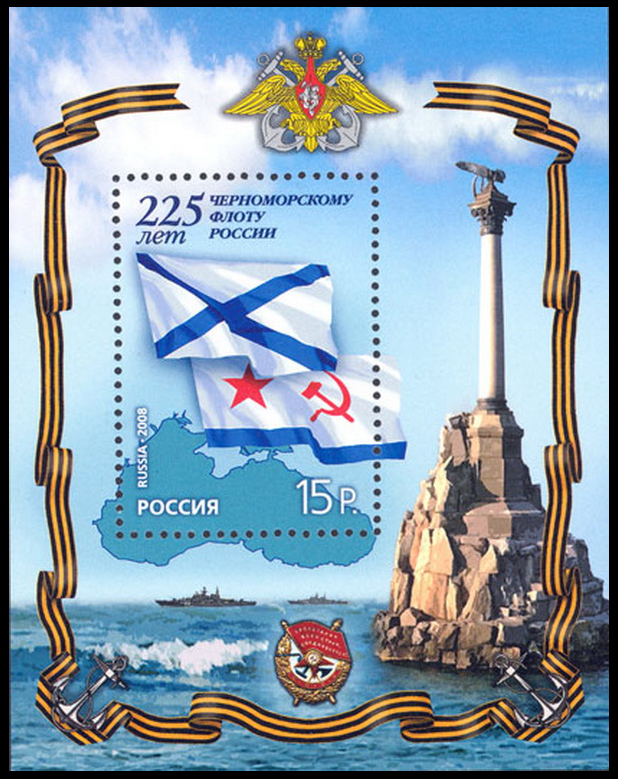
Russian stamp "225 years of the Black Sea Fleet".

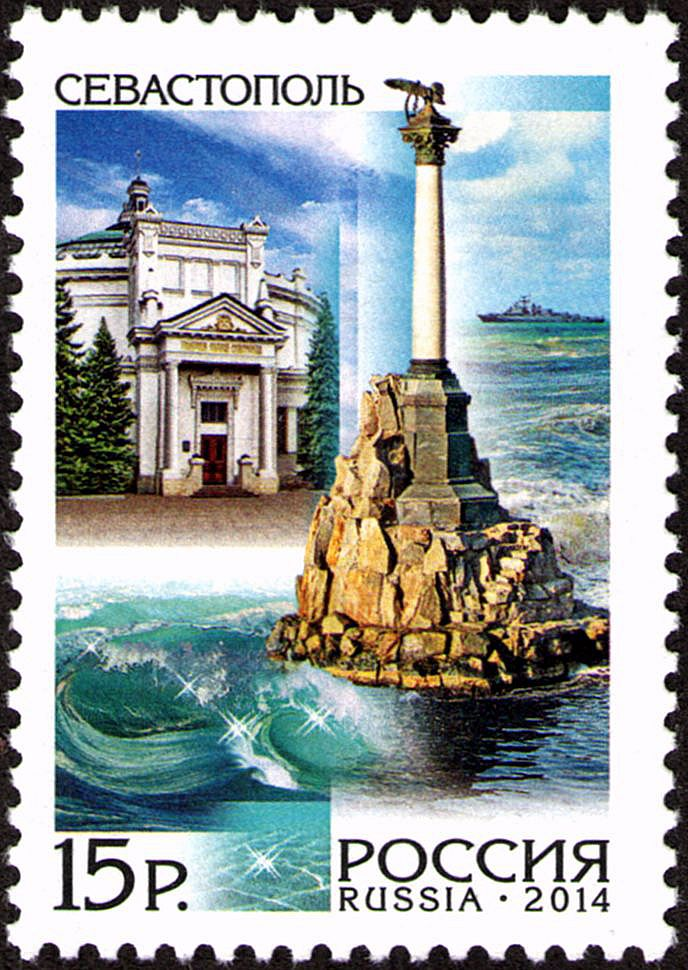
Russian stamp from "Regions of Russia" series.

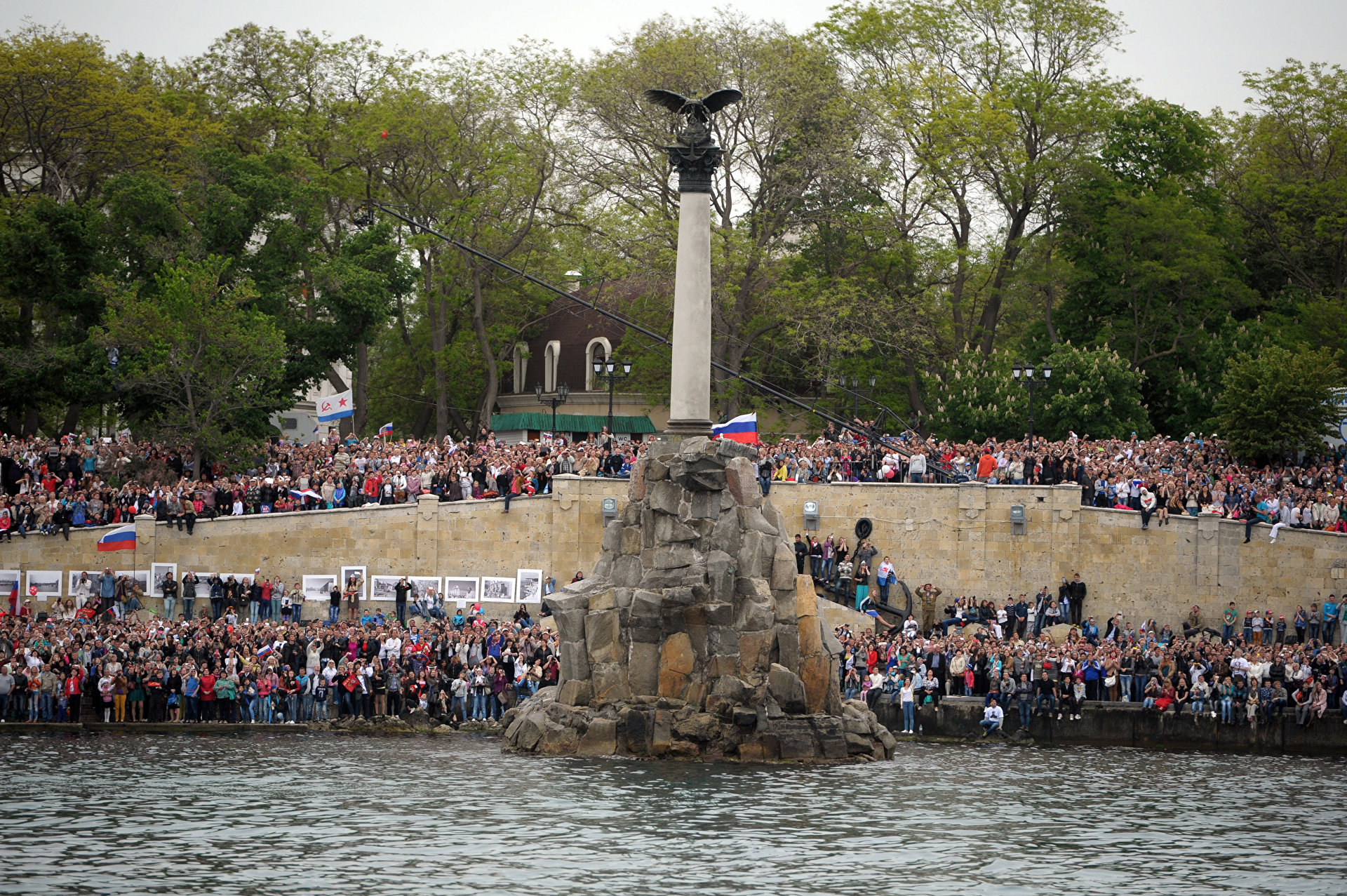
Victory Day celebration, 9 May 2014.

== Numismatics ==
Since 2017 the monument appears on the obverse of the 200 banknote of Russian ruble. Previously in 2015 it appeared on the obverse of the 100 commemorative banknote of the Russian ruble dedicated to "the accession of the Republic of Crimea to the Russian Federation and formation of new constituent entities – the Republic of Crimea and the federal city of Sevastopol".

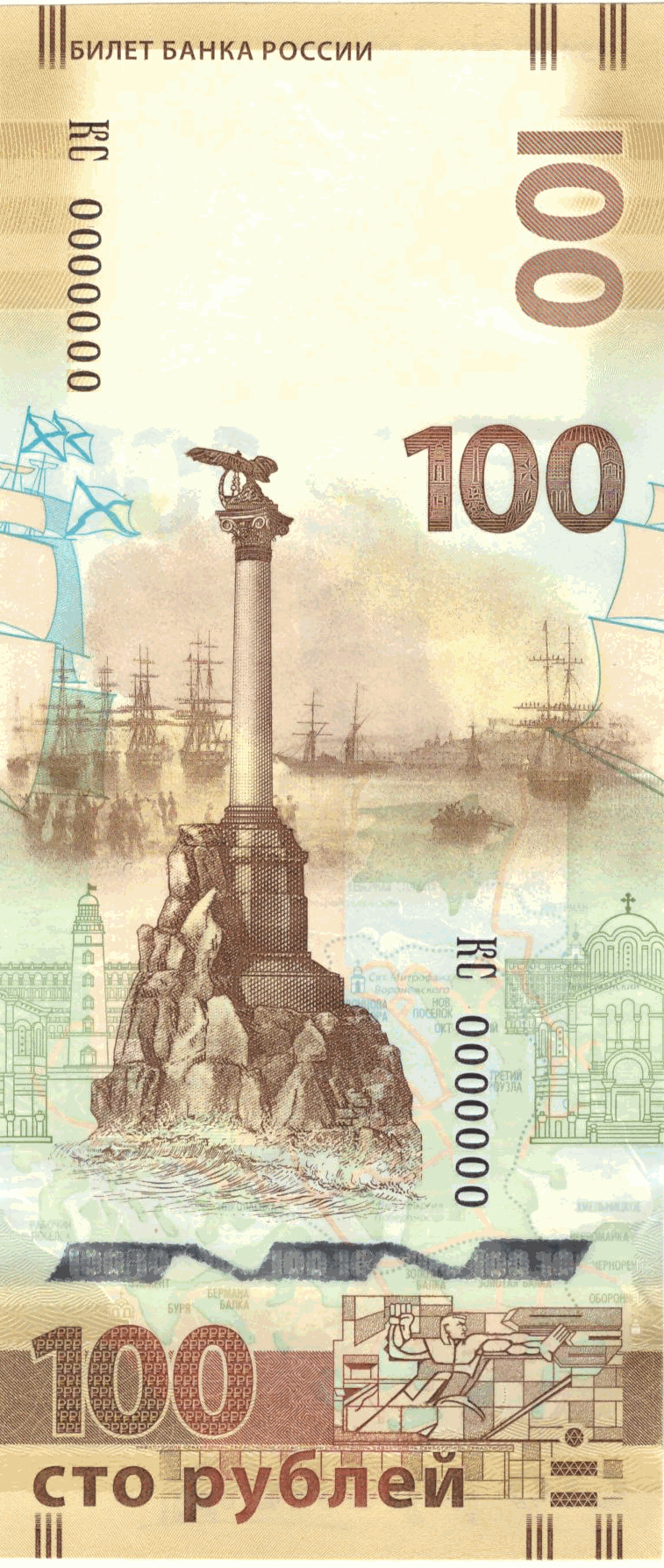
100₽ banknote (2015).

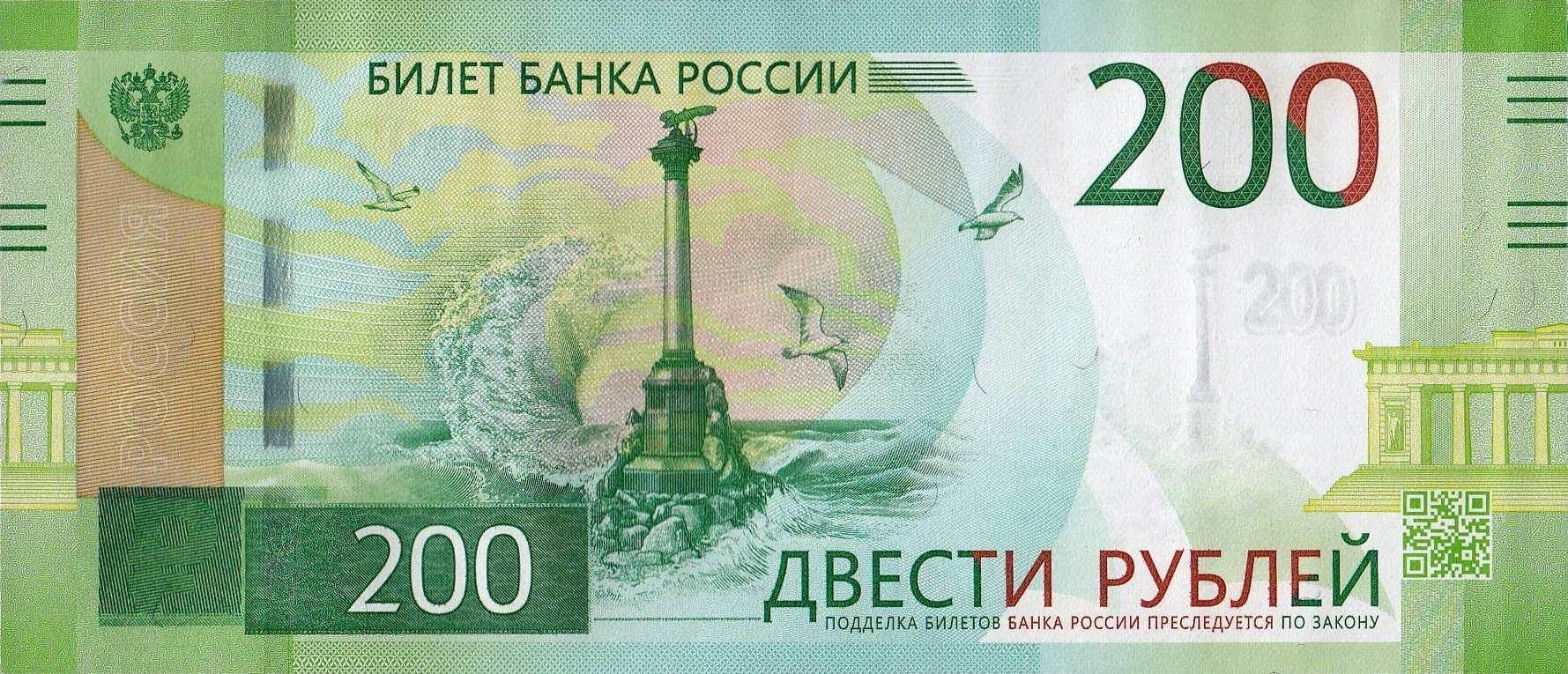
200₽ banknote (2017).

== See also ==
- Russian ship Dvienadsat Apostolov (1841), the flagship of the Black Sea fleet which was scuttled at Sevastapol in February 1854
