= Akadeemia =

Estonian magazine

- Frequency: monthly
- Website: Official website

Akadeemia is an Estonian-language cultural magazine published by Kultuurileht. 1989–2004, the journal was published by Perioodika. The journal's chief-in-editor is Toomas Kiho.

First number was issued in April 1989.
