= Eero Medijainen =

Estonian historian (born 1959)

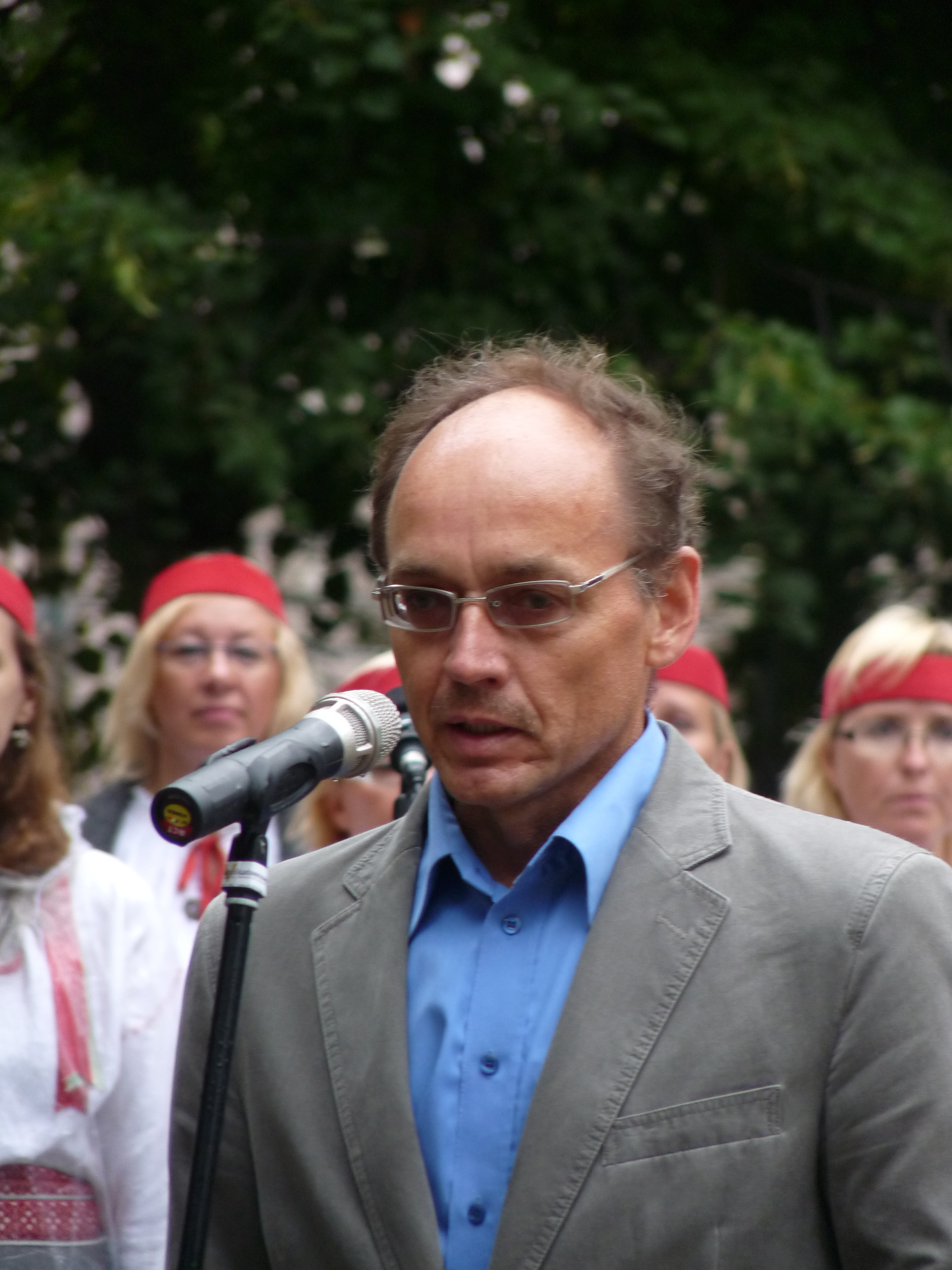
Eero Medijainen

Eero Medijainen (born 1 December 1959) is an Estonian historian. He focuses on Estonian history in the 20th and 21st centuries and Estonian foreign politics.

Since 1991 he has taught at Tartu University's Department of Contemporary History.

In 2001, he was awarded the Order of the White Star, Fifth Class.

== Publications ==
- 1939: võimalused ja valikud. Tartu 2000
- Ajaloo ja poliitika piiridel: mõtteid ja mõtisklusi. Koolibri. Tallinn 2008. ISBN 9789985020234 (in volume)
- Eesti välisministeerium ja saatkonnad 1918-1940. Tartu 1997
- Eesti välispoliitika Balti suund 1926-1934. Tartu 1991
- Entsüklopeediaga emotsioonide vastu? - Eesti Päevaleht, 22. mai 2007
- Maailm prowintsionu peeglis: rahvusvahelised suhted ja Eesti välispoliitika karikatuuridel 1918-1940. Tartu 1998
- Optieren für Estland - eine freiwillige oder eine erzwungene Migration 1920-1923? - Estland und Russland: Aspekte der Beziehungen beider Länder. Hamburg, 2005
- Salaagent Sergius Riis Eestis. - Akadeemia 2001, nr 8
- The Republic of Estonia 1918-1940. Tallinn 2001
- USA de jure tunnustusest Balti riikidele. - Akadeemia 1992, nr 10
- Raudse eesriide lõimed: propaganda, avalik arvamus ja Baltikum 1939-1944. SE & JS. Tallinn 2018. ISBN 9789949721610
