= Väljas =

Family name

Väljas is an Estonian surname. Notable people with the surname include:

- Len Väljas (born 1988), Canadian cross-country skier of Estonian descent
- Vaino Väljas (born 1931), Estonian politician
