= Amandus Adamson =

Estonian sculptor and painter (1855–1929)

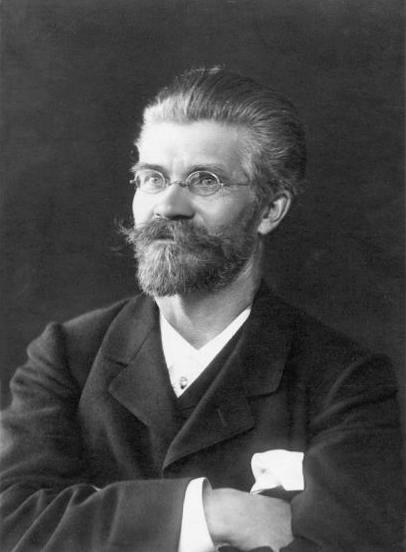
Amandus Adamson in 1914

Amandus Heinrich Adamson (12 November 1855 near Paldiski, Governorate of Estonia, Russian Empire – 26 June 1929 in Paldiski, Estonia) was an Estonian sculptor and painter.

== Life ==
Adamson was born in 1855 into an Estonian-speaking seafaring family at Uuga-Rätsepa, near Paldiski by the Gulf of Finland. His father, of local partially Swedish (Note: In a 24 September 1925 congratulatory article ahead of his 70th birthday, the Estonian newspaper Postimees wrote in a biographical paragraph that his father had originated "from an old Swedish family".) descent and a merchant vessel captain by profession, sailed to the United States in 1860, participated in the American Civil War, but never returned to Estonia and lost contact with his family after 1869.

Adamson excelled in wood carving as a child. In 1875, aged 19, he moved to Saint Petersburg (then capital of the Russian Empire) to study at the Imperial Academy of Arts under Alexander von Bock. After graduation he continued to work as a sculptor and teacher in Saint Petersburg, with an interruption from 1887 through 1891 to study in Paris and Italy, influenced by the French sculptors Jules Dalou and Jean-Baptiste Carpeaux.

Adamson produced his best-known work in 1902: His Russalka Memorial in Tallinn, dedicated to the 177 lost sailors of the Russian warship Rusalka, features a bronze angel on a slender column. Some of his other work is architectural, e.g., his four allegorical bronzes for the Elisseeff department store in Saint Petersburg, and the French-style caryatids and finial figures for the Singer House are major components of the Art Nouveau architecture visible along Nevsky Prospekt.

He was named an academician of the Imperial Academy in 1907. In 1911, Adamson, as a result of a competition arranged by the Imperial Academy, received the commission for the monument to the Tricentennial of the House of Romanov. It was to be erected in Kostroma. Adamson invested all of his money into the project, which was never finished due to the 1917 Russian Revolution. In 1918, during the Estonian War of Independence, Adamson returned to his home town of Paldiski in northwest Estonia, where he would spend most of the rest of his life, except for the larger part of 1922, when he worked in Italy.

In independent Estonia, Adamson was commissioned to sculpt multiple monuments dedicated to the recent 1918—1920 War of Independence, including one in Pärnu at the Alevi cemetery, where he himself was ultimately buried. In the aftermath of the Soviet invasion of Estonia in World War II, almost all of these monuments were destroyed by the Soviet authorities, and since Estonia regained independence in 1991, most of them have been restored.

In addition to war memorials, Adamson also created a monument to Friedrich Reinhold Kreutzwald, author of the Estonian national epic Kalevipoeg. His last work was a monument in Pärnu dedicated to Lydia Jannsen (Koidula), the national poet of Estonia.

== Selected works ==
The work of Adamson varies in style and material. He sculpted monuments in Estonia, Saint Petersburg and the Crimea, as well as architectural sculpture, allegorical figures, and portraits.

- Fisherman from the Island of Muhu (plaster, 1892)
- In Anxious Expectation (bronze, 1897)
- allegorical sculptures of Commerce, Industry, Science and Arts on the façade of Elisseeff Emporium in Saint Petersburg (bronze, 1902)
- The Russalka Memorial, Tallinn, (1902)
- allegorical sculpture for the Singer House, Saint Petersburg (1902–1904)
- Tšempion (English: Champion), bronze sculpture of Estonian strongman Georg Lurich (1903)
- Monument to the Sunken Ships, Sevastopol (1904)
- Memorial to Johann Köler, Suure-Jaani cemetery (1912)
- Monument to the Estonian War of Independence in Kuressaare (1928, destroyed 1941, restored 1941, destroyed 1945, restored 1990)
- Monument to Lydia Jannsen (Koidula), Pärnu (1929)
- Kalevipoeg (1927), part of the War of Independence monument (opened 1933, destroyed 1950, copy reopened 2003) in Tartu
- Sculpture "The Birth of Venus"

== Gallery ==
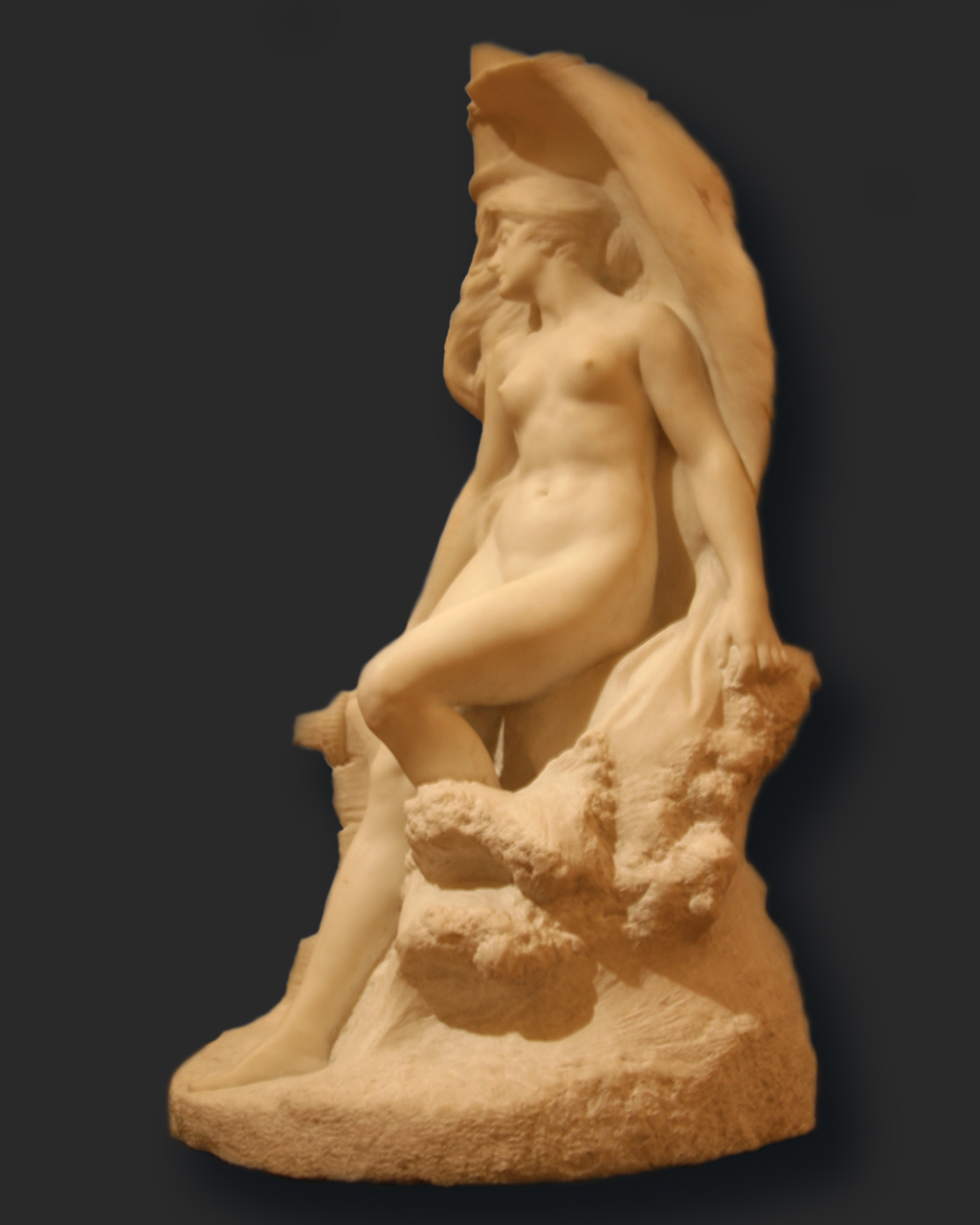
The Ship's Last Sigh, in bisque, 1899

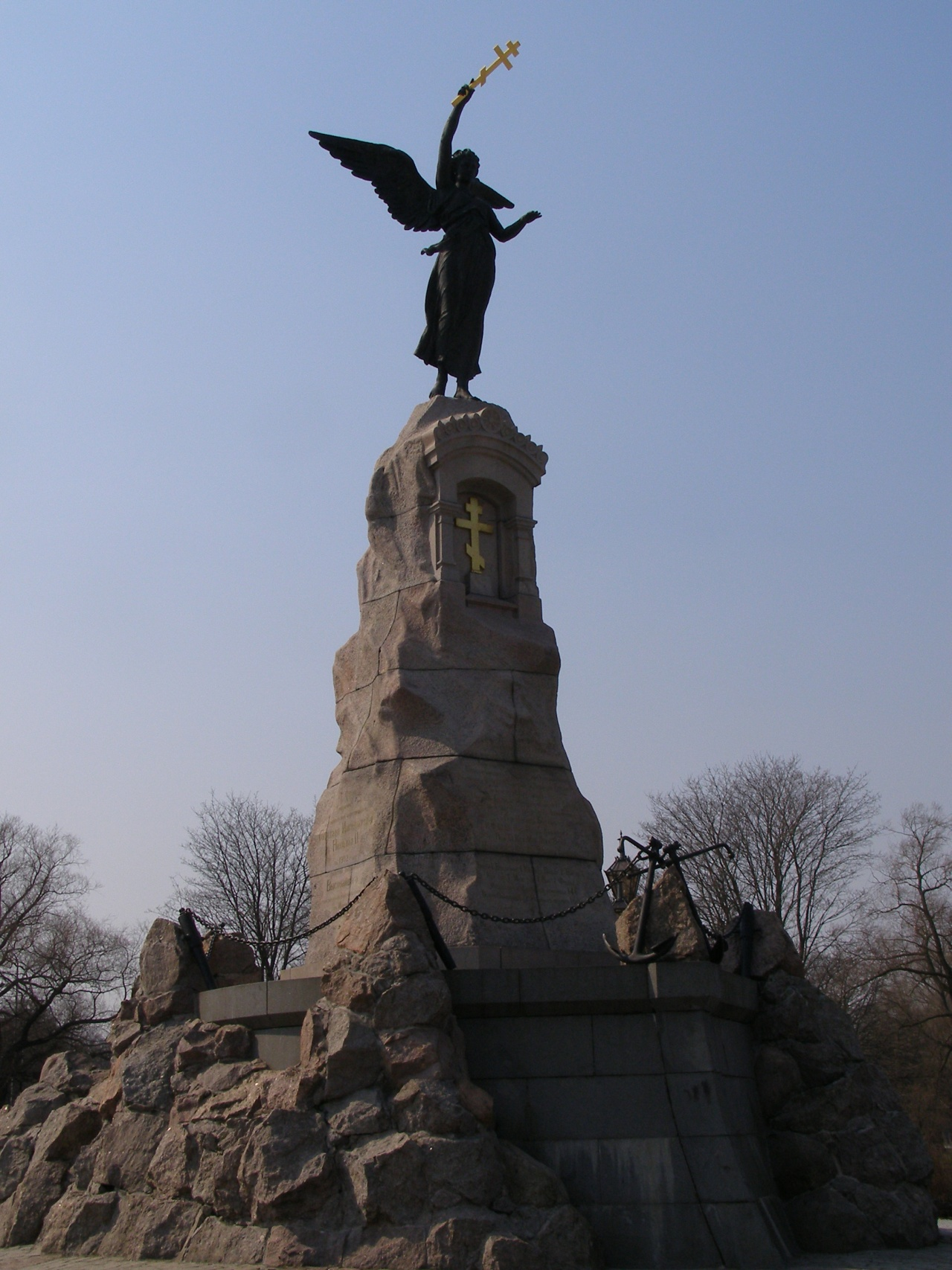
Memorial to the sailors of sunk Russian warship Rusalka, Tallinn, 1902

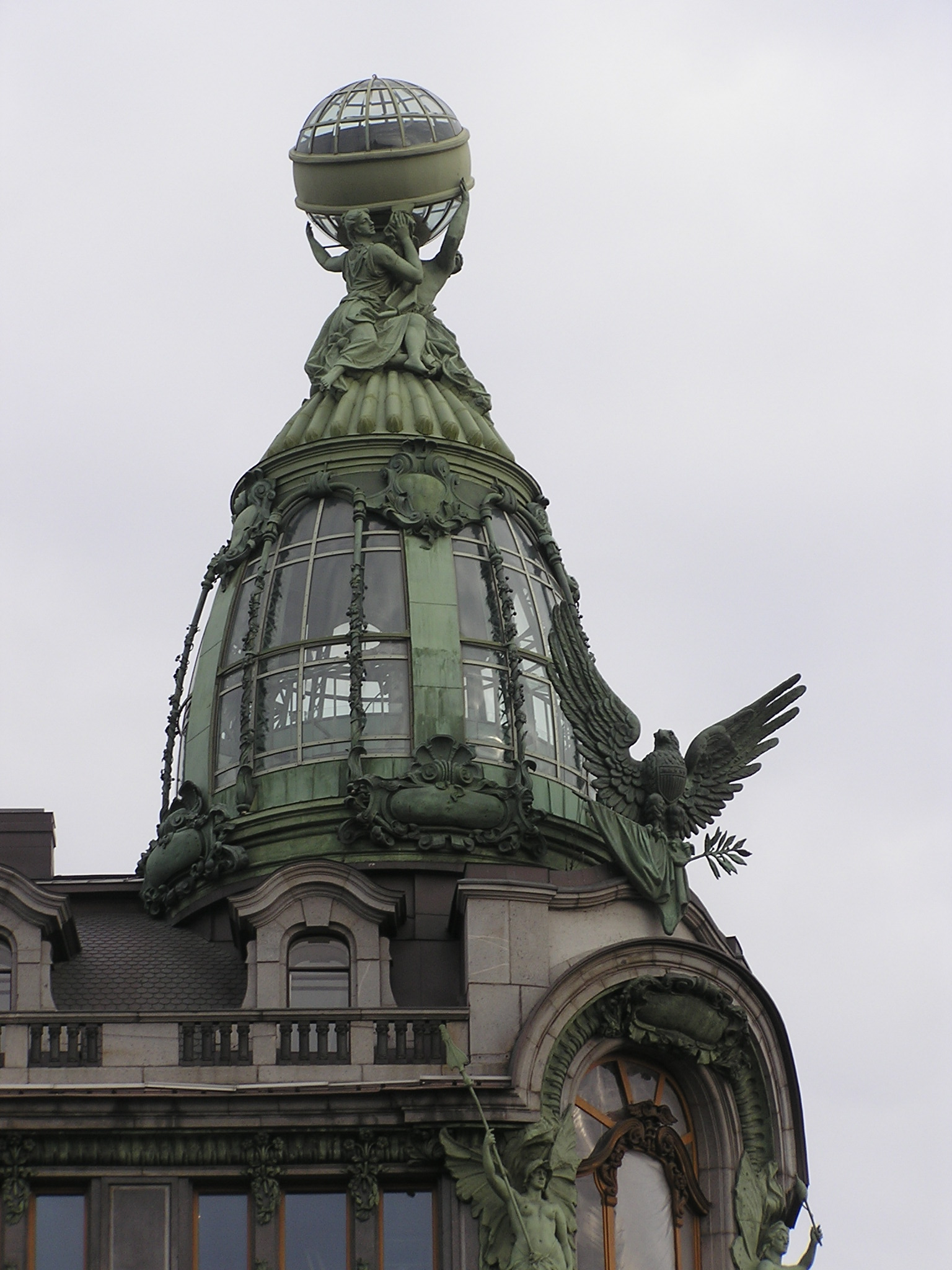
Finial figures and globe, Singer House. Saint Petersburg, 1902–1904

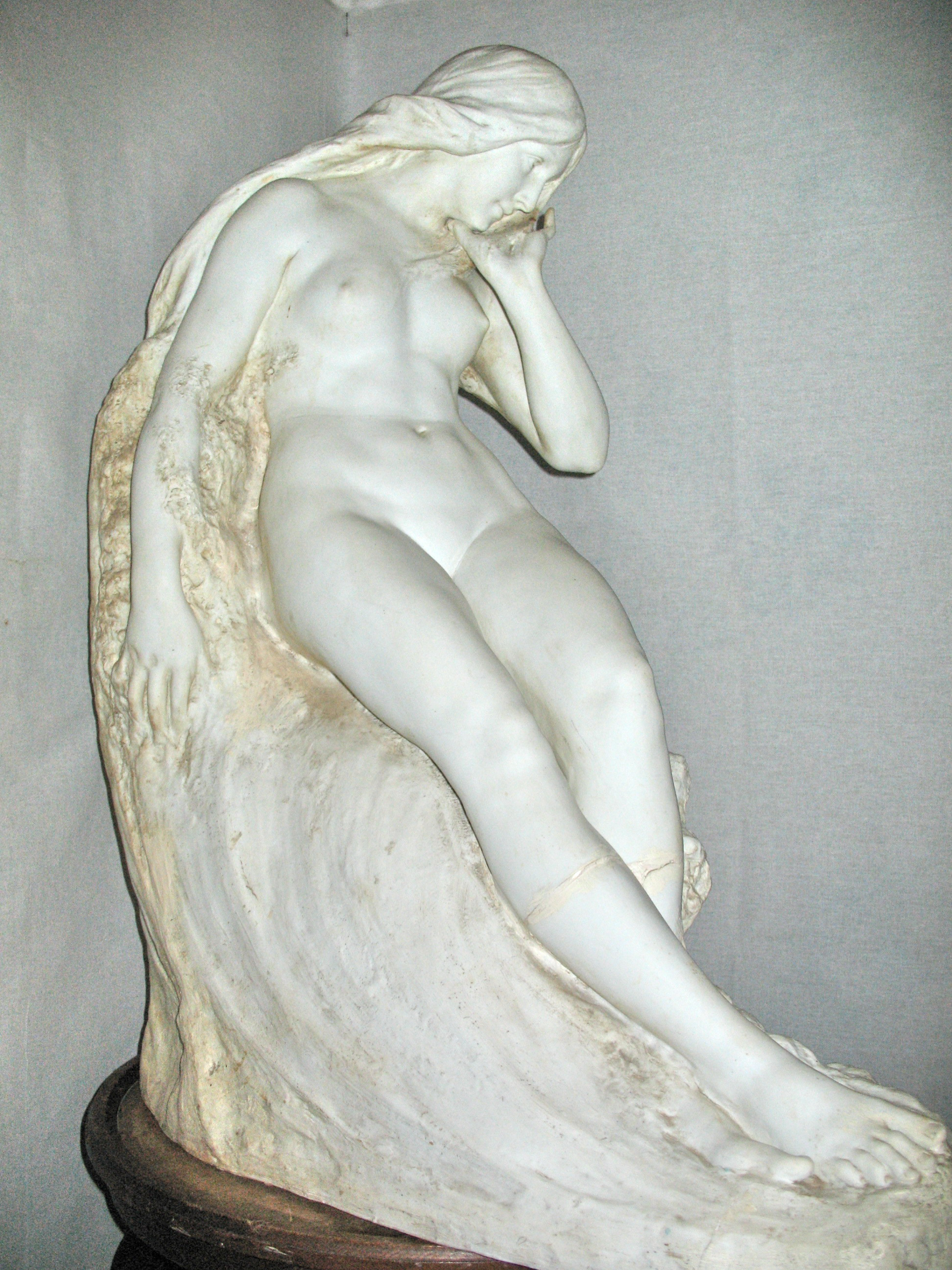
Birth of Venus, 1903

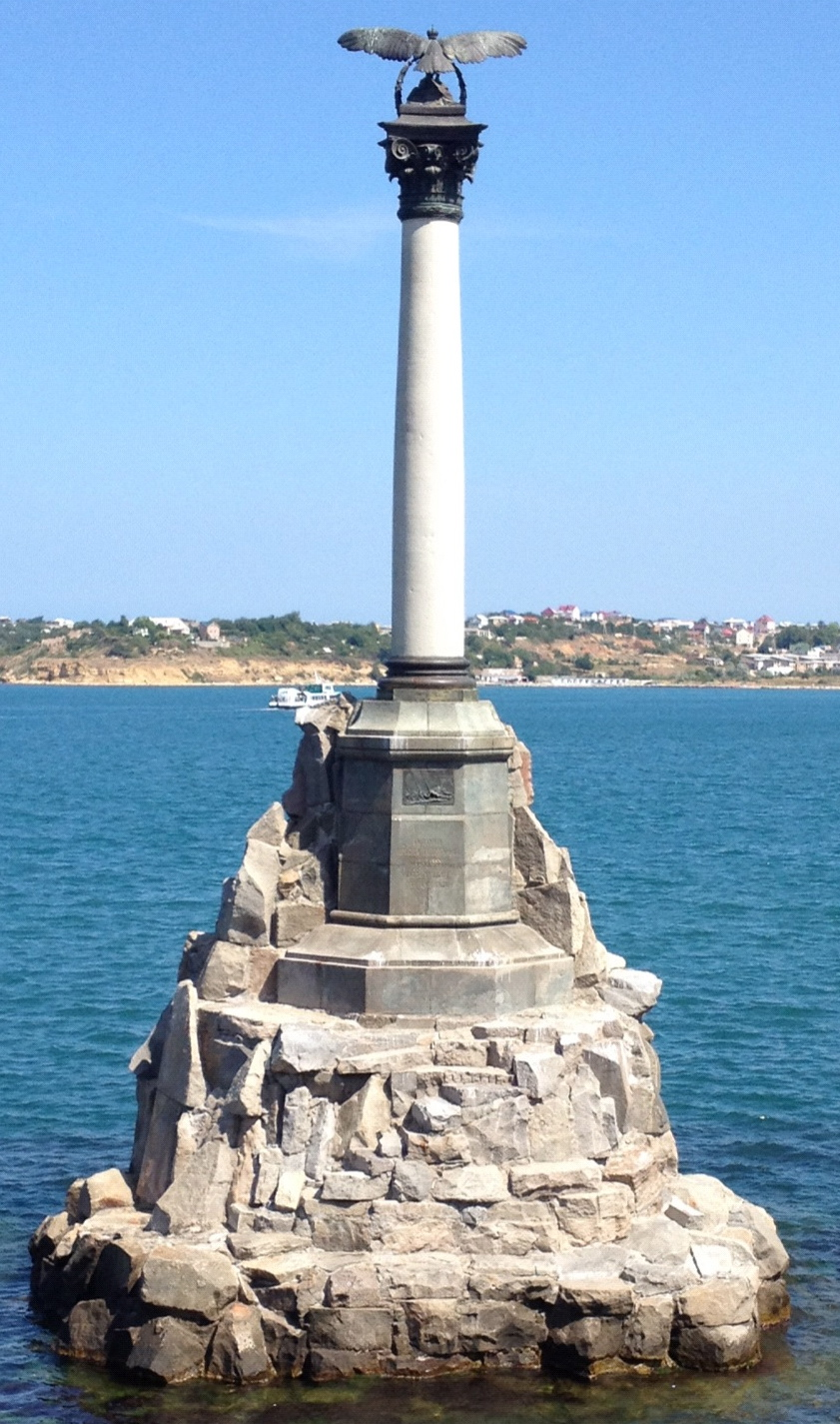
Monument to the Sunken Ships, Sevastopol, Crimea, 1905

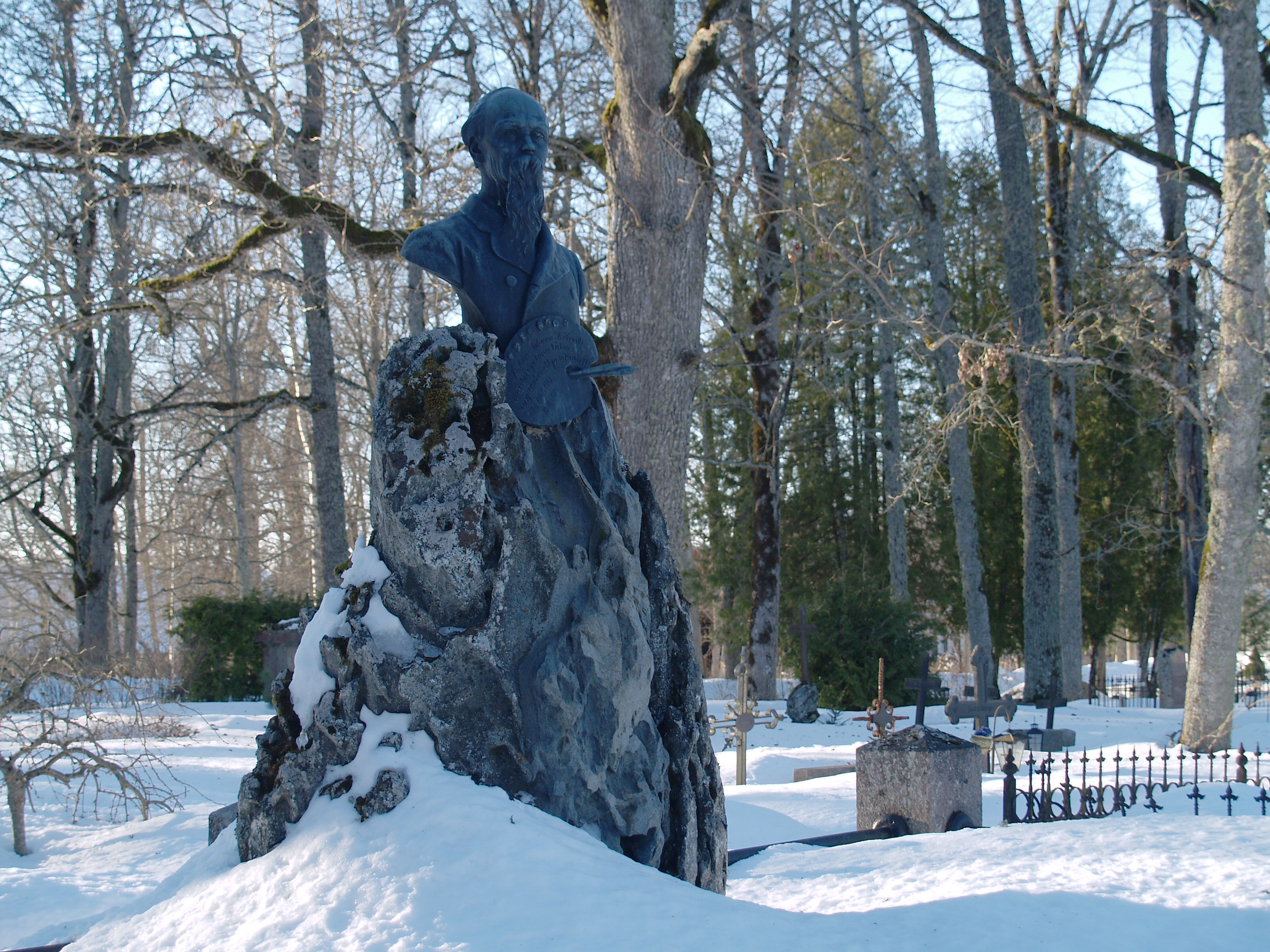
Memorial to Johann Köler, Suure-Jaani cemetery, 1912

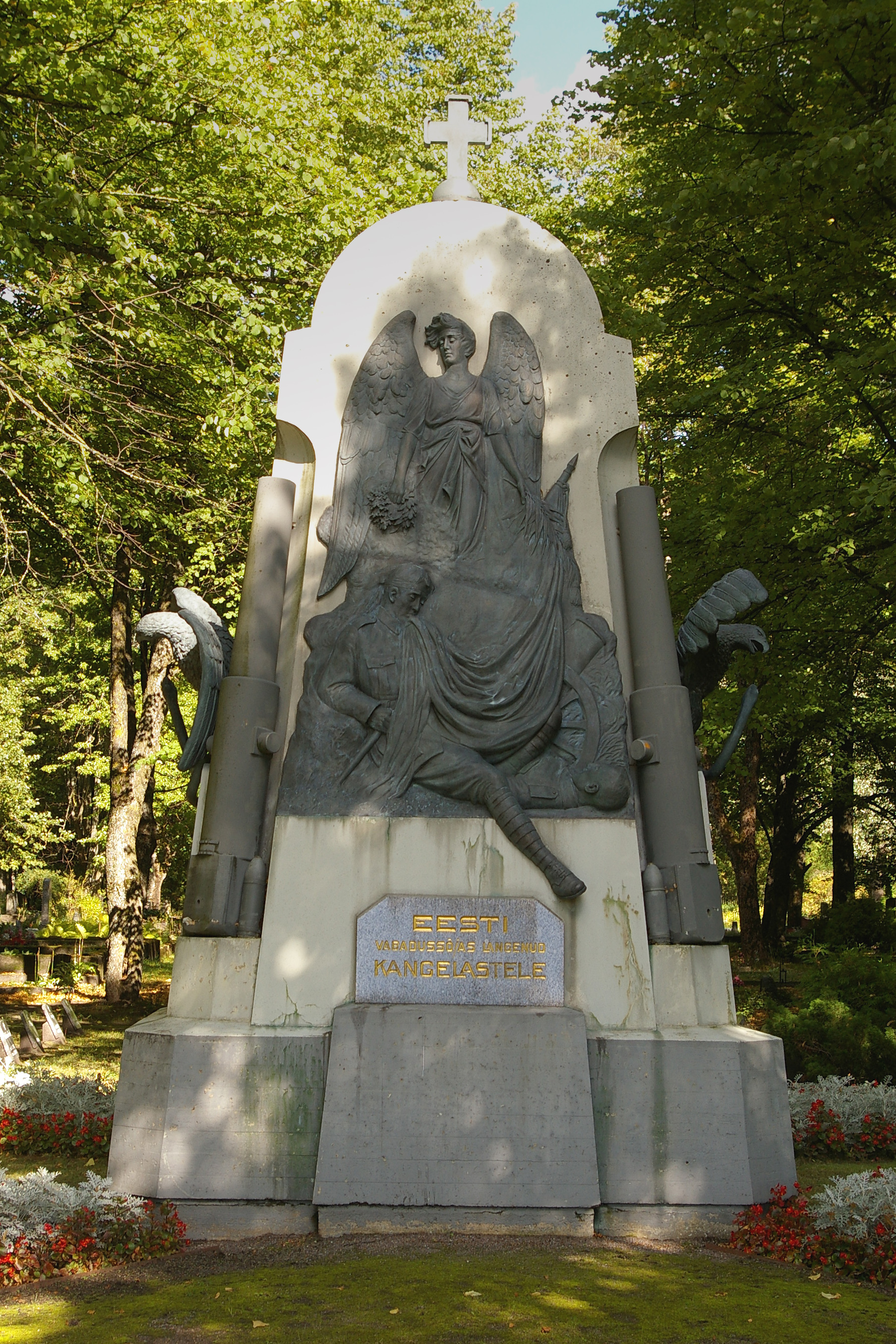
Memorial to the fallen of Estonian War of Independence, Pärnu, 1922

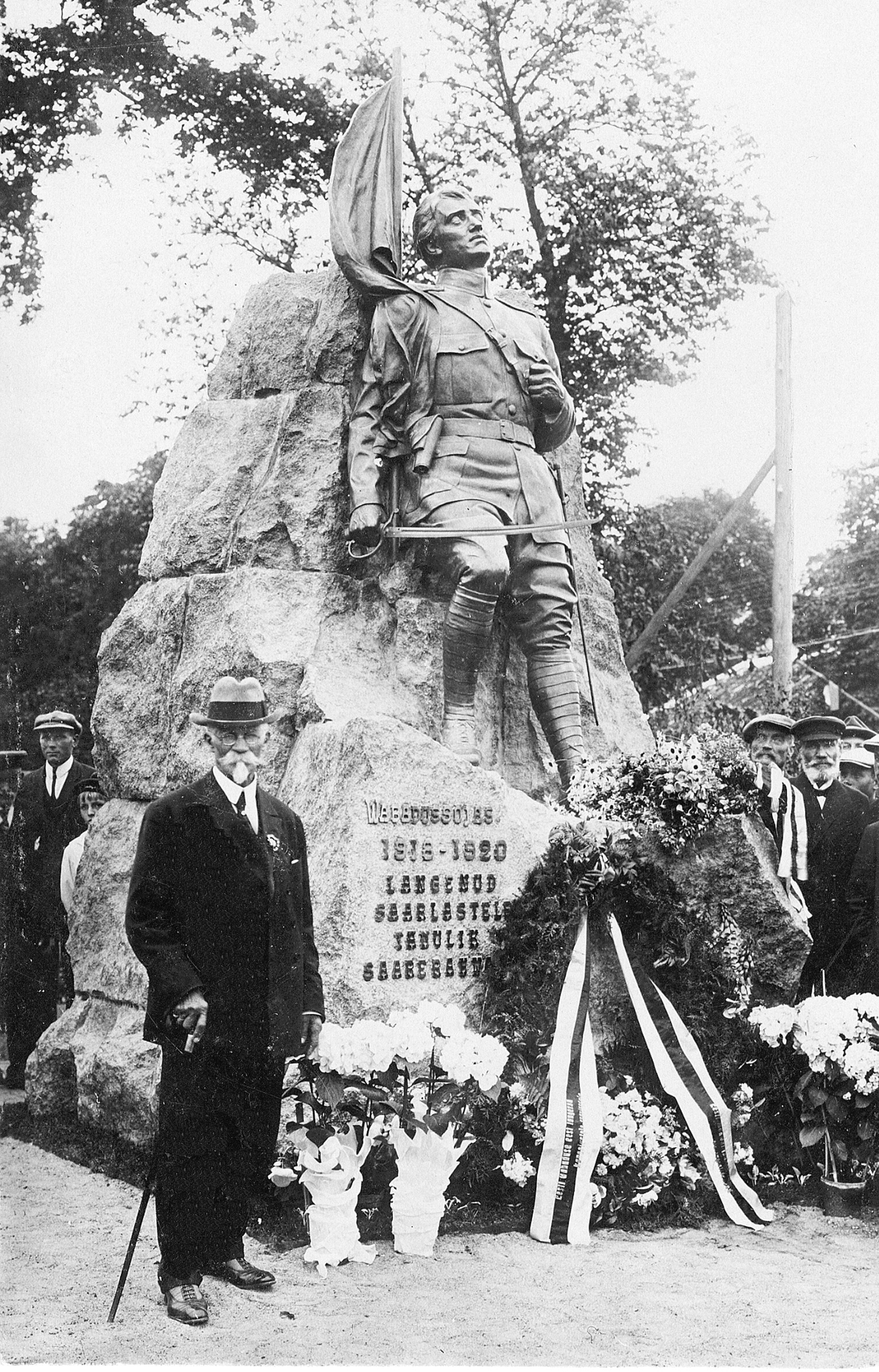
Amandus Adamson at the opening of his memorial to the fallen of Estonian War of Independence, Kuressaare, 1928

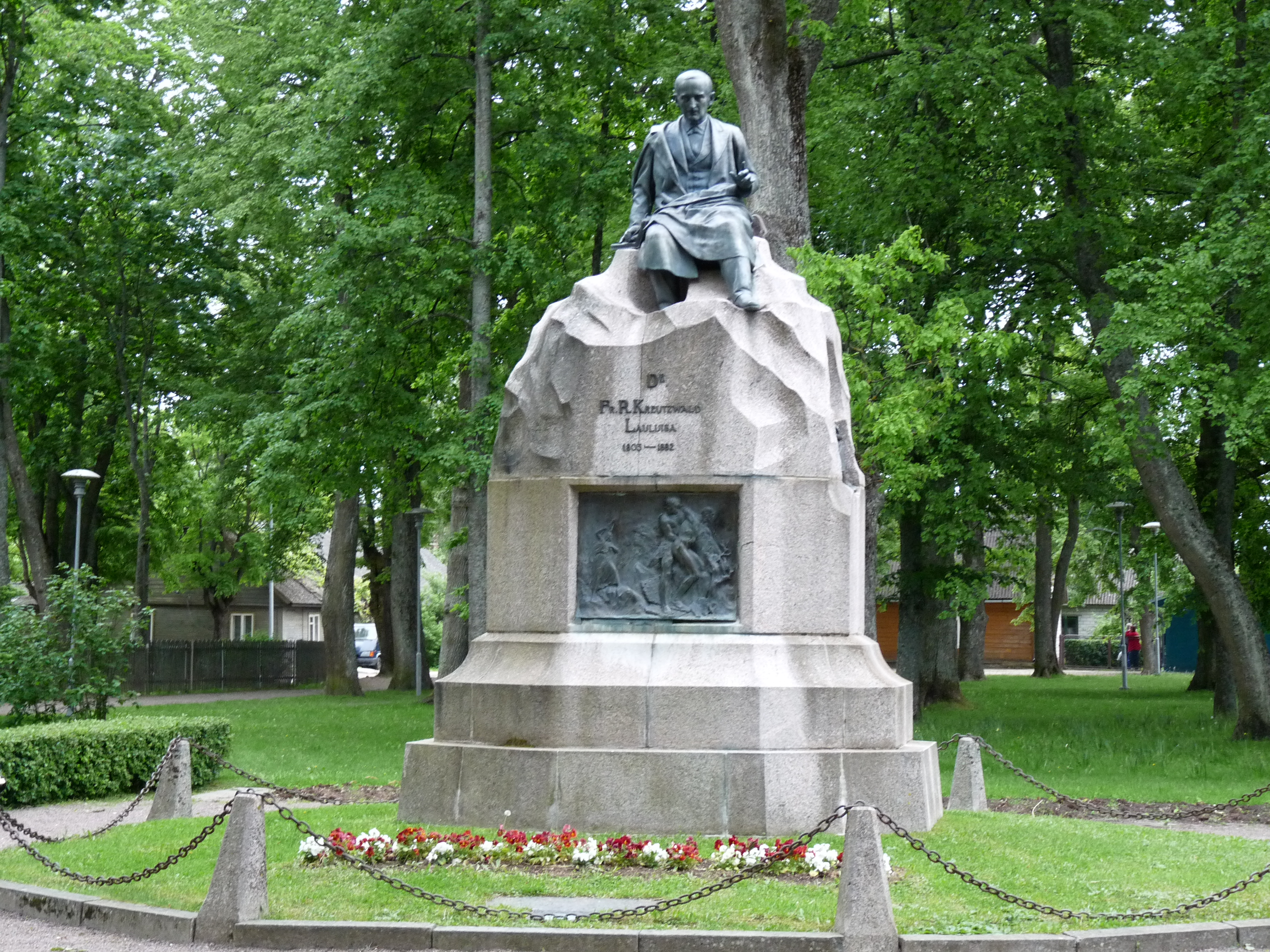
Monument to Friedrich Reinhold Kreutzwald, Võru, 1926

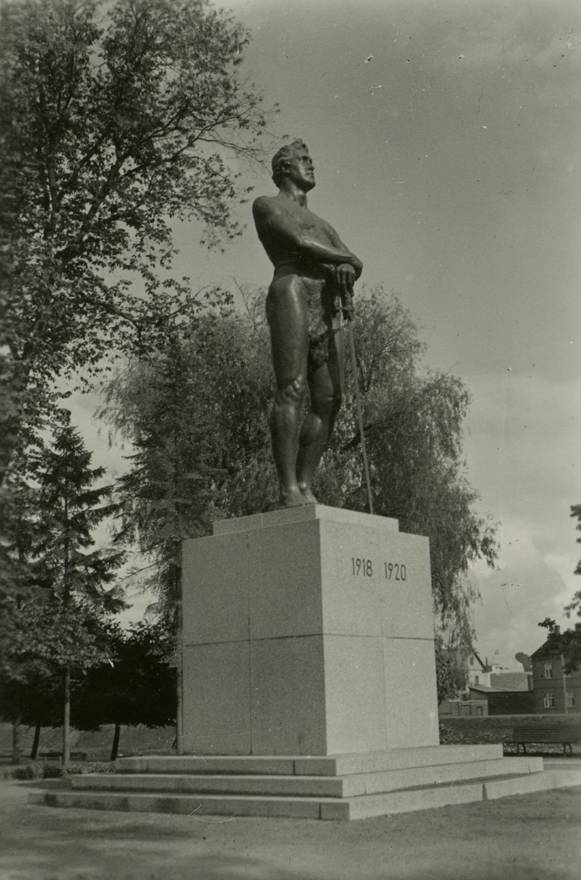
Kalevipoeg, 1927, part of the War of Independence monument, Tartu, Estonia (opened 1933)

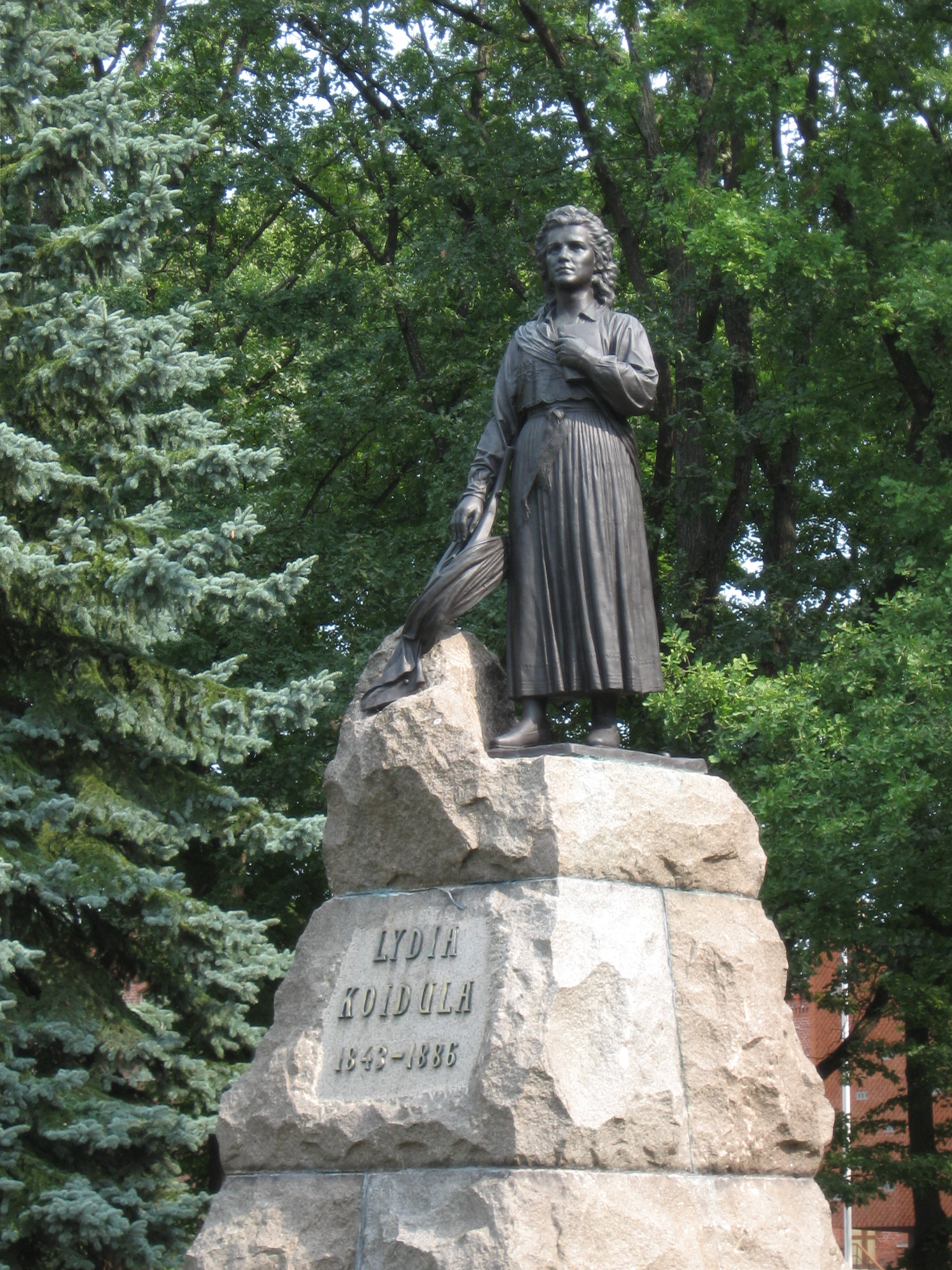
Monument to Lydia Jannsen (Koidula), Pärnu, 1929

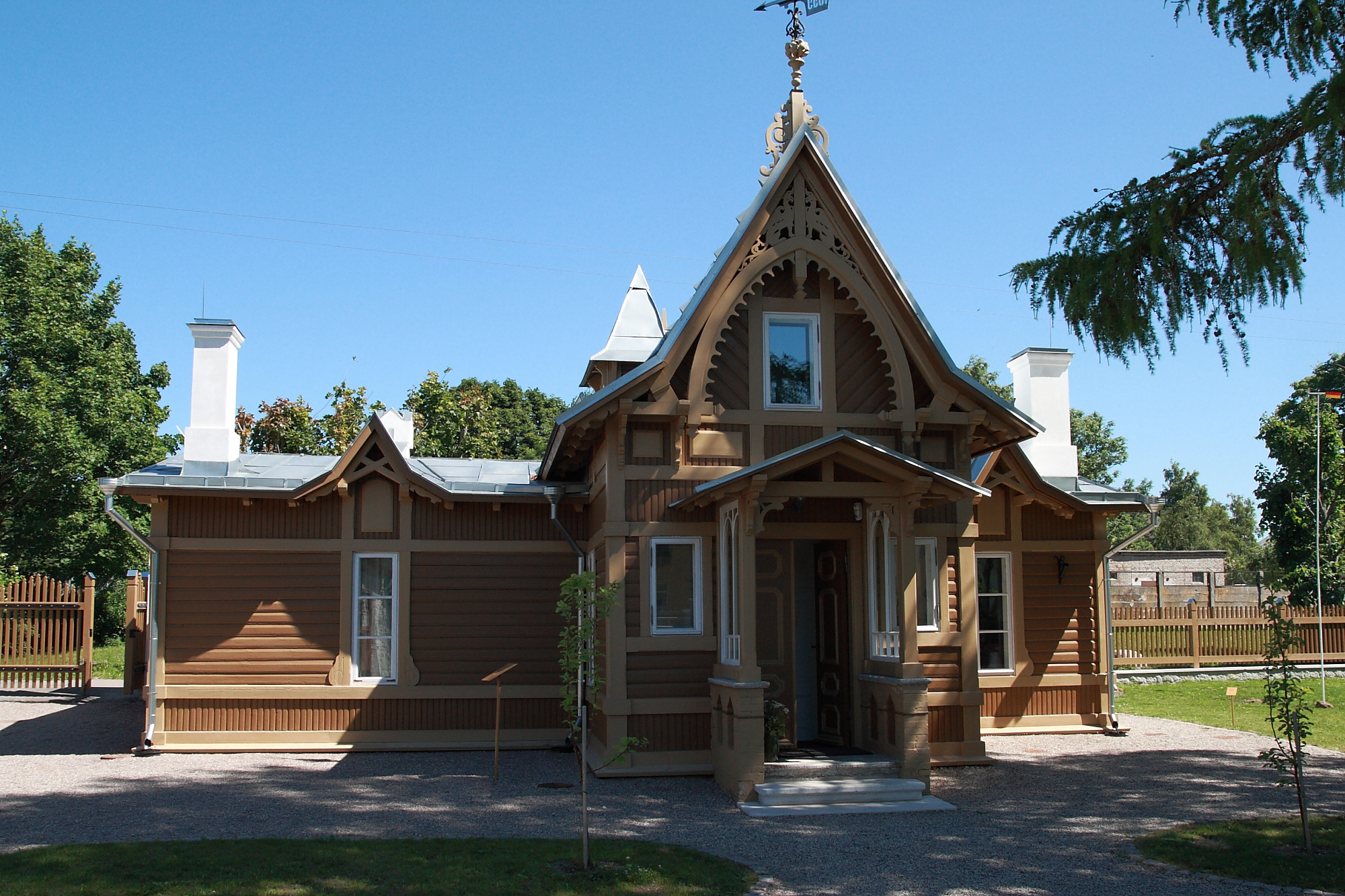
The house in Paldiski, Estonia, where Adamson lived in 1918—1929
