= Enn Kunila =

Estonian entrepreneur and art collector (born 1950)

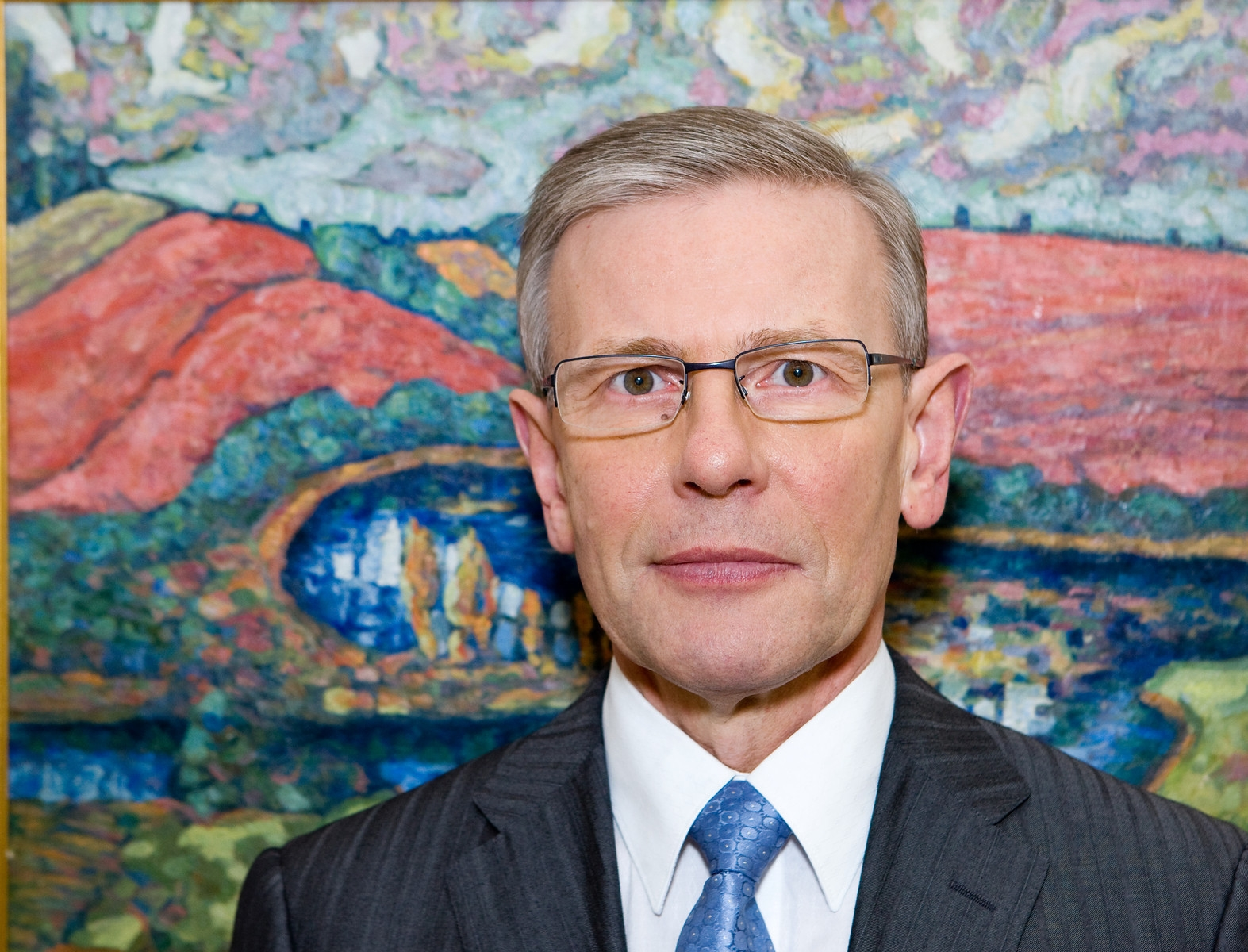
Kunila in 2010

Enn Kunila (born 19 March 1950 in Tallinn) is an Estonian entrepreneur and art collector.

Kunila is a Member of the Board and one of the shareholders of NG Investeeringud, which is one of the biggest Estonian private capital based investment and holding companies in Estonia. NG Investeeringud group employs more than 4,700 people and operates in trade, industry and real estate.

He was awarded the Order of the White Star, Fourth Class in 2006 by the President of the Republic of Estonia in recognition for his contribution to Estonian entrepreneurship.

Kunila is a member of the governing bodies of different public enterprise-related organizations. He has been the Chairman of the Council of the Association of Estonian Food Industry and a Member of the Council of The Estonian Cultural Endowment for several years.

As an art collector and patron, Kunila has been an endorser of Estonian art life. The Estonian Museum Association entitled Enn Kunila “Friend of Estonian Museums” in 2009, and in 2010 he was the honouree for the U.S. Baltic Foundation Philanthropy Award of the Baltic States. In 2012, the Estonian Minister of Culture awarded the title “Friend of Culture 2011” to Kunila.

Kunila has served as the Chairman of the Board of the Art Museum of Estonia Friends of Art Society since its foundation in 2007. He is also the founder of the Board of Art Patrons that has been an important financial supporter of the Art Museum of Estonia Friends of Art Society. Kunila is also a member of the Supervisory Board of the Art Museum of Estonia Foundation since its establishment in 2016.

By profession, Kunila is an engineering-technologist in the field of metal cutting processing.

== Career ==
- 1970–1974 the repair and mechanics factory “Progress”, Engineer in Chief/Technologist;
- 1974–1983 the specialized office of construction at the Ministry of Building Materials’ Industry of the ESSR, Metrologist in Chief of the Ministry
- 1983–1984 the manufacturing company “Vasar”, Executive of the Marketing Department
- 1984–1990 the manufacturing company “Norma”, Executive of the Marketing Department
- 1990–1991 Union of Manufacturing Cooperatives, Director
- 1991–1994 the public company “Norma”, Import Manager
- 1994–1996 Norma AS, Import Manager
- 1996–1999 Norma AS, Vice-Chairman of the Council
- 1994– ... NG Investeeringud OÜ, Vice-Chairman of the Board

== Business ==
- AS Liviko, Chairman of the Board
- AS Balbiino, Chairman of the Board
- AS Tallinna Kaubamaja Kinnisvara, Chairman of the Council
- OÜ Tartu Kaubamaja Kinnisvara, Chairman of the Council
- OÜ Roseni Kinnisvara, Chairman of the Council
- OÜ Roseni Majad, Chairman of the Board

Kunila is also a member of the boards of all the enterprises that belong to the concern of NG Investeeringud.

== Social Activity ==
- Member of the Estonian Business Association
- Member of the Board of Trustees of the Estonian Academy of Music and Theatre
- Chairman of the Board of the Art Museum of Estonia Friends of Art Society
- Member of the Board of the Cultural Society of Hiiu County
- Chairman of the Society of Friends of Hiiu County
- Member of the Council of The Estonian Employers’ Confederation 2007–2015
- Member of the Board of the Estonian Chamber of Commerce and Industry 2009–2015
- Member of the Council of The Association of Estonian Food Industry, in 2007–2015 Chairman of the Council
- Member of the Council of The Estonian Cultural Endowment in 2007–2009, 2009–2011, 2013–2015
- Member of the Supervisory Board of the Art Museum of Estonia Foundation
- Chairman of the Supervisory Board of the Konrad Mägi Foundation

== Art Collection ==
Kunila is the founder and owner of one of the finest art collections in Estonia. His art collection comprises works of art by important Estonian artists of the classical period. Kunila's art collection, both at the level of the works of art and at the level of the artists, is comparable to the permanent exhibitions of Estonian art museums concentrating on the same era.

Kunila's art collection has been exhibited at many significant exhibitions, for example in 2010 at the Tallinn Art Hall, where the exhibition From Köler to Subbi beat the all-time audience record with nearly 13,000 visitors, and in the autumn at Kunsthalle Helsinki, with the exhibition Viron Värit (Estonian Colours), which hosted the most elaborate exhibition of Estonian classical art exhibited abroad. In 2015, Kunila's art collection was exhibited in Rome at the Vittoriano Museum (Il Vittoriano) with the exhibition I colori del Nord (Nordic Colours).

Kunila has written in Estonian Classical Painting from Enn Kunila’s Collection, the book introducing his art collection:

I believe that in a small country like Estonia, every bigger art collection is also an inseparable element of the national culture. Hence, every art collector not only has the right, but also the duty to reveal their collection, to both art scholars and researchers, but first and foremost to the wider public.

— Enn Kunila, Estonian Classical Painting from Enn Kunila’s Collection, p. 6

Kunila also believes that a particular painting may be owned by him, but the value of art pertains to our culture and this obliges him to arrange exhibitions and publish books of his collection.

Artists represented in Kunila's collection include Johann Köler, Amandus Adamson, Paul Raud, Ants Laikmaa, Konrad Mägi, Nikolai Triik, August Jansen, Roman Nyman, Johannes Greenberg, Paul Burman, Ado Vabbe, Aleksander Vardi, Adamson-Eric, Johannes Võerahansu, Richard Uutmaa, Eerik Haamer, Lepo Mikko, Endel Kõks, Elmar Kits, Evald Okas, Henn Roode, Olev Subbi, Tiit Pääsuke, et cetera. The collection comprises works of art by more than 60 artists.

Kunila's main adviser in the field of art has been his friend, the painter Olev Subbi.

The art critic Eero Epner has written in the book Viron värit – 150 vuotta virolaista maalaustaidetta Enn Kunilan kokoelmasta

If, however, we look at Kunila’s art collection in a European context, then we must point out its capacity to concentrate within its framework the history of painting of a small country from its beginning to the present day. We must once again at this point emphasise that the aim of the collector has been to make his subjective choices and to base those choices on clear performances in taste. At the same time, Kunila’s collection has a museum-like quality since there are few such private collections in Europe that cover the art history of some country so thoroughly.

— Eero Epner, Viron värit – 150 vuotta virolaista maalaustaidetta Enn Kunilan kokoelmasta, p. 291

=== Art exhibitions ===
- In 2004 – the exhibition Pühapäev (Sunday) in Lohusalu
- In 2007 – exhibition of paintings by Olev Subbi at Kärdla Cultural Centre, Hiiu County
- In 2007 – the exhibition Igatsus ja kohalejõudmine. Töid Enn Kunila kogust (Yearning and Arrival. Artworks from the Collection of Enn Kunila) at the Museum of Hiiu County and Haus Gallery in Tallinn. The exhibition rendered a selection of motifs of journeys and homeland in Estonian art that had been painted in 1880–1960.
- In 2008 – the exhibition Paar sammukest rändamise teed (A Couple of Steps on the Road of Travel) at the Museum of Hiiu County. The exhibition was dedicated to the 90th anniversary of the Republic of Estonia.
- In 2010 – the exhibition Kölerist Subbini. 150 aastat eesti klassikalist maalikunsti Enn Kunila kogust (From Köler to Subbi. 150 Years of Estonian Classical Paintings from the Collection of Enn Kunila) at the Tallinn Art Hall, where 85 paintings from 34 artists were on display.

During the exhibition, Kunila also started an educational program, offering tours led by art scholar free of charge. He also gave the book Estonian Classical Painting from Enn Kunila’s Collection to all Estonian school libraries as a gift.

- In 2010 – the exhibition Valik moodsa kunsti klassikat Enn Kunila kollektsioonist (A Selection of Modern Art Classics from the Collection of Enn Kunila) at Kärdla Cultural Centre, Hiiu County.
- In 2010 – the exhibition Meri, rand ja Saaremaa Enn Kunila kollektsioonis (The Sea, the Shore, and Saaremaa in the Collection of Enn Kunila) at Kuressaare Town Hall Gallery.
- In 2010 – the most elaborated survey exhibition of Estonian art exhibited abroad, Viron värit – 150 vuotta virolaista maalaustaidetta Enn Kunilan kokoelmasta (Estonian Colours – 150 Years of the Art of Classical Estonian Painting from the Collection of Enn Kunila) at Kunsthalle Helsinki.

There were 111 artworks by 44 painters on display at the exhibition in Kunsthalle Helsinki.

- November 2010–February 2011 – the exhibition Valik graafikat ja joonistusi Enn Kunila kollektsioonist (A Selection of Graphic Art and Drawings from the Collection of Enn Kunila) at the Museum of Hiiu County.
- In 2013 – the exhibition Ühe keti neli lüli. Laikmaa, Mägi, Vabbe, Kits (Four Links of One Chain. Laikmaa, Mägi, Vabbe, Kits) at the Museum of Hiiu County.

The exhibited artists were pioneers of the traditions of Estonian painting. The artists displayed are the four links of one chain which is the history of Estonian art, particularly the painting tradition based on colour-concentration and the impression of nature.

- In 2013 – the exhibition Ühe keti neli lüli 2. Roode, Subbi, Põldroos, Pääsuke (Four Links of One Chain 2. Roode, Subbi, Põldroos, Pääsuke) at the Museum of Hiiu County.
- In 2013 – the exhibition Nordic Colours. Estonian Art 1910–1945 from Enn Kunila´s Collection at the European Parliament, Brussels.
- In 2014 – the exhibition Kuldaja värvid. Eesti klassikaline maalikunst Enn Kunila kollektsioonist (Colours of the Golden Age. Classical Estonian Painting from Enn Kunila's Collection) at Mikkel Museum

For the first time in Estonia, an interactive multimedia programme Journey in the Golden Age was available to visitors. It utilised tablet computers that visitors could borrow from the museum. The exhibition was accompanied by a catalogue compiled by the curator Eero Epner, as well as a story and colouring book called Fish Net and Milk Can.

- In 2015 – the exhibition I Colori del nord. L'arte estone tra il 1910 ed il 1945 dalla collezione di Enn Kunila (Nordic Colours. Estonian Art 1910–1945 from Enn Kunila´s Collection) at Vittoriano Museum Il Vittoriano in Rome.
- In 2015 – the exhibition Värvide sümfoonia. Eesti klassikaline maalikunst Enn Kunila kollektsioonist (Symphony of Colours. Classical Estonian Painting from Enn Kunila’s Collection) at Kuressaare Castle in Saaremaa.

7 March 2015 marked the passing of 85 years since the birth of the painter Olev Subbi. The anniversary of his birth was commemorated with two exhibitions:

- 7–15 March 2015 – Abstract Art by Olev Subbi. This exhibition was held at the Vabaduse [Freedom] Gallery in Tallinn, where nine Olev Subbi paintings from five private collections were on display.
- 11 March – 5 April 2015 – Human Form and Space in the Work of Olev Subbi. 20 paintings from Enn Kunila’s collection and the collections of the Art Museum of Estonia, the Tallinn Art Hall, and the Tartu Art Museum were on display at this exhibition that was held at the Tartu Art House.
- In 2017 – the exhibition Visioni dal nord. Pittura estone dalla collezione Enn Kunila, 1910–1940 / Visions from the North. Estonian Painting from Enn Kunila’s Collection, 1910–1940 in Florence, at Museo Novecento.
- In 2017 – the exhibition Eesti kunstnike rännakud. Valik maale Enn Kunila kollektsioonist (Wanderings of Estonian Artists. A Selection of Paintings from Enn Kunila’s Collection) at the Museum of Hiiu County.
- In 2017 – the exhibition Põhjamaa suvi. Olev Subbi aktimaalid (Northern Summer. Nude Paintings by Olev Subbi) at Kuressaare Castle in Saaremaa.
- In 2018 – the exhibition Rõõm linna südames. Maalid Enn Kunila kollektsioonist (Joy in the Heart of the City. Paintings from Enn Kunila's Collection) at Tallinn Town Hall.
- In 2018 – the exhibition Olev Subbi aktimaalid ja Lurich (Olev Subbi's Nudes and Lurich) at Kärdla Cultural Centre, Hiiu County.
- In 2018 – the exhibition Traditsiooni sünd. Eesti klassikaline maalikunst Enn Kunila kollektsioonist (The Birth of a Tradition. The Golden Age of Estonian Art from Enn Kunila’s Collection) at Tartu Art Museum.
- In 2018 – the exhibition Muusika ja teater Eesti maalikunstis (Music and Theatre in Estonian Painting) at Kuressaare Castle.

Additionally, works of art from Enn Kunila's art collection have been on display at many important exhibitions, including the representational exhibition of Estonia in Paris in 2001, and the exhibitions Grand Tour. Eesti kunstnikud Itaalias (Grand Tour. Estonian Artists in Italy) in 2008–2009, Neoimpressionismi jälgedes. Mägi ja Finch. (Tracing Neo-Impressionism: Mägi and Finch) in 2010, Igavesti naiselik. Johannes Greenbergi ja Ferdi Sannamehe looming (Forever Feminine. The Work of Johannes Greenberg and Ferdi Sannamees) in 2011, Aedade järelelu (The Afterlives of Gardens) in 2013, Lepo Mikko in 2013–2014, Natuuri rikkus. Eluläheduse idee ja Düsseldorfi koolkond (The Force of Nature. Realism and the Düsseldorf School of Painting) in 2015, Ants Laikmaa. Vigala ja Capri (Ants Laikmaa. Vigala and Capri) in 2015–2016, Konrad Mägi at the Galleria Nazionale d'Arte Moderna e Contemporanea in Rome in 2017–2018, Konrad Mägi in 2018–2019 at the Art Museum of Estonia, and also at several other exhibitions.

=== Publications ===
Art books and albums that have accompanied the exhibitions of Enn Kunila's collection:

- Hain, J. (2004). Pühapäev: Olev Subbi maalid (Sunday: The Paintings of Olev Subbi). Tallinn: Printon. (28 pages)
- Epner, E. (2007). Igatsus ja kohalejõudmine: töid Enn Kunila kogust (Yearning and Arrival: Artworks from the Collection of Enn Kunila). Tallinn: Sperare. (173 pages)
- Epner, E., Pählapuu, L., (2007). Paar sammukest rändamise teed: valik maale Enn Kunila kogust (A Couple of Steps on the Road of Travel: A Selection of Paintings from the Collection of Enn Kunila). Tallinn: Sperare. (55 pages)
- Epner, E. (2010). Eesti klassikaline maalikunst Enn Kunila kollektsioonis (Estonian Classical Painting from Enn Kunila's Collection). Tallinn: Sperare. (207 pages), published during the exhibition From Köler to Subbi. 150 Years of the Art of Classical Estonian Painting from the Collection of Enn Kunila.
- Epner, E. (2010). Valik moodsa kunsti klassikat Enn Kunila kollektsioonist (A Selection of Modern Art Classics from the Collection of Enn Kunila). Tallinn: Sperare. (38 pages)
- Epner, E., Pählapuu, L., (2010). Meri, rand ja Saaremaa Enn Kunila kollektsioonis (The Sea, the Seashore, and Saaremaa in the Collection of Enn Kunila). Tallinn: Sperare (52 pages)
- Epner, E. (2010). Viron värit – 150 vuotta virolaista maalaustaidetta Enn Kunilan kokoelmasta (Estonian Colours – 150 Years of the Art of Classical Estonian Painting from the Collection of Enn Kunila). Tallinn: Sperare. (270 pages). The book includes summaries in English, Swedish and Estonian.
- Epner, E. (2013). Ühe keti neli lüli. Laikmaa, Mägi, Vabbe, Kits (Four Links of One Chain. Laikmaa, Mägi, Vabbe, Kits). Tallinn: Sperare. (116 pages)
- Epner, E. (2013). Ühe keti neli lüli 2. Roode, Subbi, Põldroos, Pääsuke (Four Links of One Chain 2. Roode, Subbi, Põldroos, Pääsuke). Tallinn: Sperare. (46 pages)
- Epner, E. (2013). Nordic Colours. Estonian Art 1910–1945 from Enn Kunila´s Collection. (Exhibition at the European Parliament in Brussels 23–27 September 2013) Tallinn: Sperare. (87 pages)
- Epner, E. (2013). Nordic Colours. Estonian Art from Enn Kunila´s Collection. Tallinn: Sperare. (159 pages)
- Epner, E. (2014). Kuldaja värvid. Eesti klassikaline maalikunst Enn Kunila kollektsioonist (Colours of the Golden Age. Classical Estonian Painting from Enn Kunila's Collection). Tallinn: Sperare. (120 pages)
- Epner, E., Rõõmus, J. (2014) Kalavõrk ja piimamannerg (Fish Net and Milk Can), colouring book. Tallinn: Sperare. (32 pages).
- Epner, E. (2015). I colori del nord. L'arte estone tra il 1910 ed il 1945 dalla collezione di Enn Kunila (Nordic Colours. Estonian Art 1910–1945 from Enn Kunila's Collection). Tallinn: Sperare. (135 pages)
- Epner, E. (2015). Värvide sümfoonia. Eesti klassikaline maalikunst Enn Kunila kollektsioonist (Symphony of Colours. Classical Estonian Painting from Enn Kunila's Collection). Tallinn: Sperare. (56 pages)
- Epner, E. (2017) Visioni dal nord. Pittura estone dalla collezione Enn Kunila, 1910–1940 (Visions from the North. Estonian Painting from Enn Kunila’s Collection, 1910–1940). Tallinn: Sperare. (130 pages)
- Epner, E. (2017) Põhjamaa suvi. Olev Subbi aktimaalid (Northern Summer. Nude Paintings by Olev Subbi). Tallinn: Sperare. (80 pages)
- Epner, E. (2018) Rõõm linna südames. Maalid Enn Kunila kollektsioonist (Joy in the Heart of the City. Paintings from Enn Kunila's Collection). Tallinn: Sperare. (104 pages)
- Epner, E. (2018) Traditsiooni sünd. Eesti kuldaja kunst Enn Kunila kollektsioonist (The Birth of a Tradition. Art from Estonia's Golden Age from Enn Kunila's Collection). Tallinn: Sperare. (245 pages)

Kunila has additionally published several biographical and art books:

- Epner, E. (2006). Subbi, monograph, Tallinn: Sperare (295 pages), which Kunila dedicated to Olev Subbi, his friend and adviser in the field of art.
- Põldroos, E. (2008). Enn Põldroos. Maalid 1967–2007 (Enn Põldroos. Paintings 1967–2007), Tallinn: Sperare, (166 pages), published to celebrate the 75th birthday of Enn Põldroos.
- Epner, E. (2015). Olev Subbi, biography, Tallinn: Sperare. (390 pages). The 85th anniversary of the birth of Olev Subbi was commemorated with the publication of this book.
- Epner, E. (2017). Konrad Mägi, biography in the Estonian language. Tallinn: Sperare. (626 pages). This biography has been translated into English (2017), Italian (2017), French (2018) and Finnish (2018).
- Epner, E. (2017). Konrad Mägi ja tema värvide salakeel, colouring book in the Estonian language. Tallinn: Sperare. (48 pages). This book has been translated into English (Paint like Konrad Mägi, 2017), Italian (Dipingi come Konrad Mägi, 2017), French (Colorie comme Konrad Mägi, 2018) and Finnish (Konrad Mägi ja salaperäiset värit, 2018).

== Acknowledgements ==
- In 2006 Kunila was awarded the Order of the White Star, Fourth Class by the President of the Republic of Estonia for his contribution in Estonian entrepreneurship.
- In 2009 the Estonian Museum Association entitled Kunila “Friend of Estonian Museums”.
- In 2010 Kunila was the honouree for the U.S. Baltic Foundation's Philanthropy Award of the Baltic States for introducing and supporting Estonian art and culture. Thereat he was acknowledged for his charitable activity in organizing art exhibitions, in publishing different art books, and in arranging events to introduce art and culture.
- In 2012 the title “Friend of Culture 2011” was awarded to Kunila by the Estonian Minister of Culture.
- 2012 – the Hiiu County Government recognised Kunila with the Hiiu County Distinguished Service Plaque for supporting and fostering cultural and athletic activity in Hiiumaa.
- 2013 – the Harju County Honorary Decoration was conferred on Kunila.
- 2015 – the Ministry of Foreign Affairs of the Republic of Estonia recognised Kunila with a letter of appreciation for introducing Estonian culture in the world.
- 2016 – the Estonian Food Industry Association mark of distinction for long-term contribution to the work of the Association.
- 2017 – the Estonian Chamber of Commerce and Industry Order of Merit, 1st Class.
- 2017 – Kultuurivedur [Cultural Locomotive] award conferred by the Postimees newspaper.
- 2018 – EY Eesti Ettevõtja [Estonian Entrepreneur] lifetime achievement award.
- 2018 – Tallinn’s Honorary Decoration – for his major contribution to the development of Tallinn’s enterprise and business culture and as a token of appreciation for his patronage of Estonian art.
- 2018 – Commander of the Order of Merit of the Italian Republic [Commendatore Ordine al Merito della Repubblica Italiana].
- 2018 – Kultuurisõber [Friend of Culture] 2018.
- 2019 – recognition from the City of Tartu for supporting culture

== Personal life ==
In addition to art, Kunila's interests also include tennis and chess.
