= Art Museum of Estonia Friends of Art Society =

Art organization based in Estonia

The logo of the Art Museum of Estonia Friends of Art Society

Art Museum of Estonia Friends of Art Society was founded in 2007 with the intention to contribute in the improvement of art in Estonia and to popularize art within the Estonian nation, to introduce Estonian art abroad and also to support the organizing of the exhibitions of the Estonian Art Museum abroad. The goals of the Society are also improving the activity of the Estonian Art Museum, collocating open-minded friends of culture who are interested in contributing in the growth of the collections of the Estonian Art Museum, and also developing and supporting the library of the Estonian Art Museum.

Next to the Art Museum of Estonia Friends of Art Society operates the Board of Art Patrons which is an important financial supporter of the Art Museum of Estonia Friends of Art Society, as the members of the Board are paying higher membership fee.

== Members of the Board of the Friends of Art Society ==
The members of the Board of the Art museum of Estonia Friends of Art Society are Enn Kunila (chairman of the board), Märt Haamer, Sirje Helme, Kai-Riin Meri, Tarmo Saaret ja Kersti Tiik.

== Artwork donations ==
The Art Museum of Estonia Friends of Art Society has helped the Estonian Art Museum to complement its collection, purchasing important artwork for the museum.

The artwork donations of the Art Museum of Estonia Friends of Art Society to the Estonian Art Museum:

- In 2008 the painting „Merepõhi“ (“Seafloor“) (1964) by Eerik Haamer.
- In 2009 the portrait of Peter August Friedrich von Koskull by Michael Ludwig Claus.
- In 2010 the oil painting „Laud“ (“The Table“) by Märt Laarmann

== Postage stamps of the Gold Foundation ==
On the birthday of the Art Museum of Estonia the Art Museum of Estonia Friends of Art Society, in collaboration with Eesti Post and the Art Museum of Estonia annually publish an art stamp. The purpose of publishing the stamp series is to introduce Estonian art to the biggest audience possible.

=== Artwork depicted on the stamps ===
- On the stamp published in 2010 ─ a partial reproduction of the painting „Lennuk“ (“Airplane“) by Nikolai Triik, the stamp was designed by Lembit Lõhmus.
- On the stamp published in 2011 ─ a partial reproduction of the painting „Turg (Lilleturg)“ (“Market (Flower Market)”) by Henn Roode, the stamp was designed by Lembit Lõhmus.
- On the stamp published in 2012 ─ a fragment of the painting „Natüürmort mandoliiniga“ (“Still-life with the Mandolin“) (1958, oil/canvas) by Leppo Mikko, the stamp was designed by Lembit Lõhmus.

=== Postal stationery ===
In 2008 Kumu Art Museum was awarded with the European Art Museum title and to celebrate the award, the Society in collaboration with Eesti Post published the postal stationery depicting the reproduction of the painting "Maastik punase pilvega" ("Landscape With A Red Cloud“) by Konrad Mägi, the master of the Estonian classic art. "Maastik punase pilvega" (“Landscape With A Red Cloud“) is the only artwork by an Estonian author that the experts of art have chosen to the chrestomathy "1001 Paintings You Must See Before You Die".

In addition to publishing the postal stationery, the Society gave booklets both in Estonian and English of the oil painting "Maastik punase pilvega" ("Landscape With A Red Cloud") by Konrad Mägi to Kumu Art Museum as a gift for handing out for free. The gift also included the passport of the painting and a chrestomathy, compiled by art scientists, which includes the full history of the painting.

== Supporting Art Museum of Estonia ==
In addition to the art donations and postage stamp series of the Gold Foundation of the Art Museum the Society has also financially supported the Art Museum in publishing catalogues of its exhibitions.

Catalogues published with the support of the Society:

- In 2011 ─ catalogues of the exhibition „Vinum et panis. Veini ja leiva motiiv 16.-20. sajandi kunstis“ („Vinum et panis. Motifs of Wine and Bread in the Art of the 16th─20th century)
- In 2012 ─ „Kollektsionääri kirg. Hõbe ja graafika Reinansi kogust“ (“The Passion of A Art Collector. Silver and Graphics in the Collection of Reinans”).

On the request of the Art Museum of Estonia the Society also supported the organizing of the exhibition "John Constable. Victoria & Alberti muuseumi kogudest" ("John Constable. From the Collections of Victoria and Albert Museum").
