= Saaremaa Museum =

Museum in Kuressaare, Estonia

- Saaremaa Muuseum
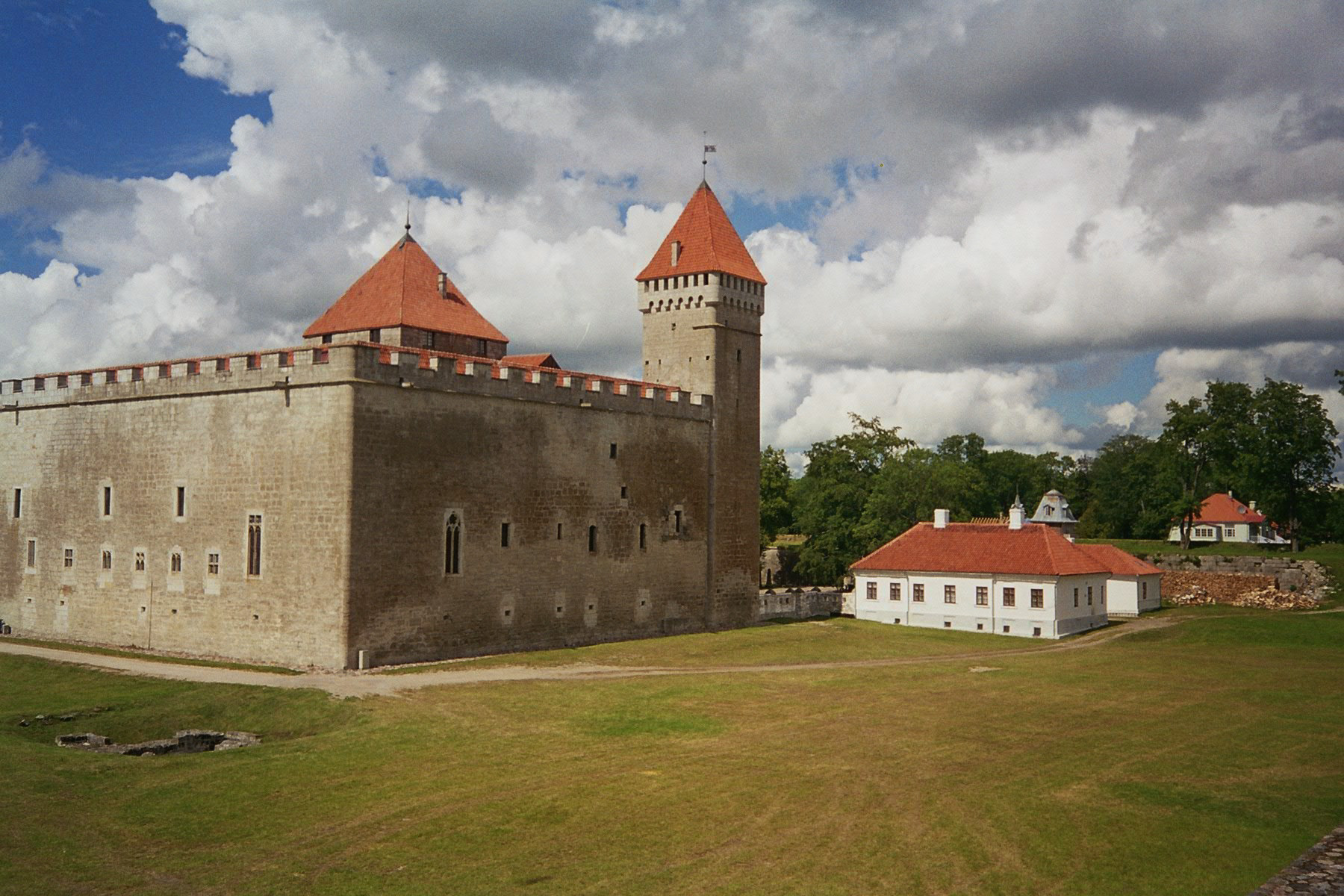
- Kuressaare Castle in 2004, where the Saaremaa Museum is housed in
- Established: 1865; 161 years ago
- Location: Kuressaare, Estonia
- Coordinates: 58.2473°N 22.4794°E
- Type: History museum
- Director: Priit Kivi
- Website: samu.ee

The Saaremaa Museum (Estonian: Saaremaa Muuseum) is a museum in Kuressaare, Saare County, Estonia. The museum exhibits items from Saaremaa. It is one of the oldest and largest museums in Estonia.

== History ==
On 17 February 1865, the Saaremaa Research Society (Estonian: Saaremaa Uurimise Selts; German: Verein zur Kunde Oesels) was founded in Kuressaare. The society collected museum exhibits which would be held in the Saaremaa Museum. The first exhibition was done on 4 January 1866.

The museum underwent several name changes particularly during and after World War II. During the Soviet occupation of the Baltic states in 1940, the Saaremaa Museum was renamed to the Local History Museum (Estonian: koduloomuuseumiks). The former name was restored during the German occupation of the Baltic states until the Soviet re-occupation of the Baltic states. After World War II, the museum officially reopened for visitors on 15 June 1947. From 1946–1950, the name Kuressaare County Museum (Estonian: Kuressaare Maakondlik Muuseum) was also used. In 1950, the museum was renamed to Kuressaare rajoonidevaheliseks koduloomuuseumiks (since 1952 Kingissepa rajoonidevaheliseks koduloomuuseumiks due to the renaming of the city of Kuressaare to Kingissepa). In 1959, the museum was renamed to the Saaremaa Local History Museum (Estonian: Saaremaa koduloomuuseum). In 1990, the original name of the museum, Saaremaa Museum, was restored.

The current director of the Saaremaa Museum is Priit Kivi.

== Exhibitions ==
Name	Image	Type	Summary	Location	URL
Johannes and Joosep Aavik's Memorial Museum (et)		Biographical	House museum of linguist Johannes Aavik and local cultural activist Joosep Aavik	Vanalinna 7; 58°15′27.72″N 22°29′3.61″E	
Kuressaare Castle		Historic Site	Historical Kuressaare Episcopal Castle	Lossihoov 1; 58°14′48.86″N 22°28′45.88″E	
Mihkli Farm Museum (et)		Cultural	19th century local rural village	Viki; 58°20′59.72″N 22°4′49.11″E	
