= Andres Järving =

Estonian entrepreneur (born 1960)

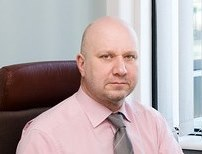
Andres Järving

Andres Järving (born 3 July 1960) is an Estonian entrepreneur who is known for one of Estonia's largest private capital based investment and holding companies, NG Investeeringud, of which Järving was one of the majority shareholders until the end of 2023. NG Investeeringud group employs nearly 5400 people and operates in trade, industry and real estate.

== Education ==
- 1983 Tartu State University, Economic Cybernetics
- 2005 University of Tartu, Psychology, BA
- 2002 University of Tartu, Business Management master's course

== Academic membership ==
- Fraternitas Estica (coetus)

== Professional experience ==
- 1983-1988 Tallinn city soviet council committee, economist and department deputy manager
- 1988-1990 manufacturing community Norma, deputy head accountant
- 1992-1996 AS Norma, financial manager
- 1996-1999 AS Norma, vice chairman of the board
- 1994-2023 OÜ NG Investeeringud, member of the board
- 1999-2022 AS Selver, chairman of the board
- 2002-2024 OÜ NG Kapital, member of the board
- Since 2000 OÜ Probus, member of the board

== Entrepreneurship ==
Until 2023

- OÜ NG Investeeringud, vice chairman of the board
- AS Selver, chairman of the board
- Kulinaaria OÜ, chairman of the board
- AS Liviko, member of the board
- AS Balbiino, member of the board
- Kitman Thulema AS, member of the board
- AS Tallinna Kaubamaja Group, member of the board
- AS Tallinna Kaubamaja, member of the board
- AS TKM King, member of the board (TKM King was created as a result of merging Suurtüki NK OÜ and AS ABC King)
- ABC King AS, member of the board
- AS TKM Auto, member of the board
- AS KIA Auto, member of the board
- AS Viking Motors, member of the board
- UAB KIA Auto, member of the board
- SIA Forum Auto, member of the board
- AS Tallinna Kaubamaja Kinnisvara, member of the board
- OÜ Tartu Kaubamaja Kinnisvara, member of the board
- AS Viking Security, member of the board
- OÜ TKM Beauty, member of the board
- OÜ Roseni Kinnisvara, member of the board
- OÜ Roseni Majad, member of the board
- AS Wellman Invesco, member of the board
- 2001-2007 Ganiger Invest OÜ, member of the board
- 2000-2007 Baltic Rail Services, OÜ member of the board

== Membership in business organisations and associations ==
- 2015-2023 Estonian Chamber of Commerce and Industry, member of the board
- 2008-2015 Estonian Traders Association, member of the board
- Member of the Oversight Board of the Ministry of Finance

== Participation in non-profit and social organisations ==
- Long-term member of Enterprise Estonia's mentor programme
- Member of Fraternitas Estica alumni council

== Interests ==
- History
- Nature
- Forestry
