= Landscape with a Red Cloud =

1913 painting by Konrad Mägi

- Maastik punase pilvega (Estonian)
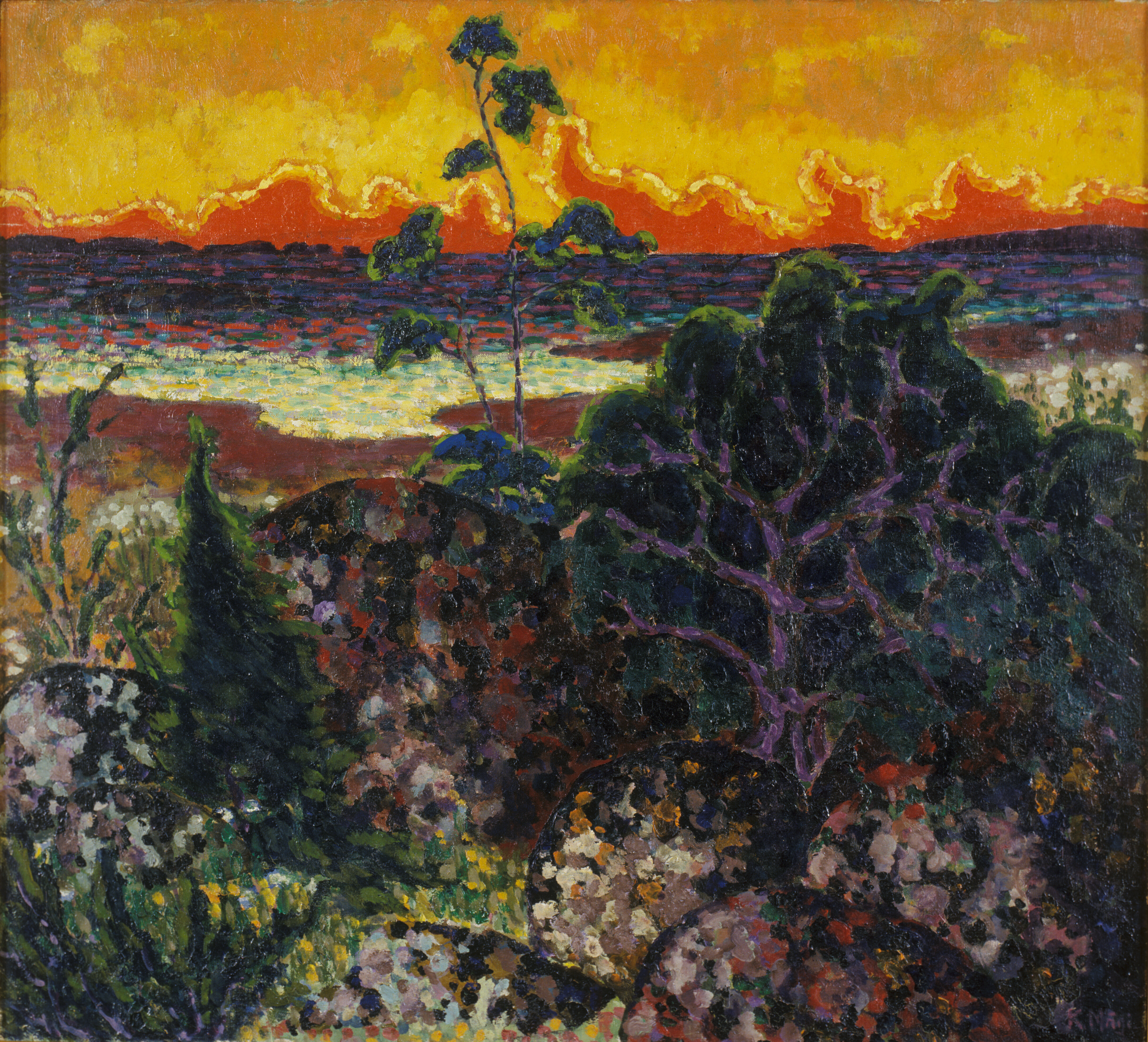
- Artist: Konrad Mägi
- Year: 1913
- Medium: oil on canvas
- Dimensions: 66.3 cm × 55 cm (26.1 in × 22 in)
- Location: Kumu Art Museum; Tallinn

Landscape with a Red Cloud (Estonian: Maastik punase pilvega) is a painting by Estonian artist Konrad Mägi from 1913 to 1914.

== Description ==
The painting's dimensions are 66.3 x 55 centimeters. It is in the collection of the Art Museum of Estonia and is exhibited in Kumu Art Museum.

== Analysis ==
Stephen Farthing added it to his book 1001 Paintings You Must See Before You Die, published in 2008.
