= Kadriorg =

Subdistrict of Tallinn, Estonia

Coordinates: 59°26′18.39″N 24°47′30.82″E

- Subdistrict of Tallinn
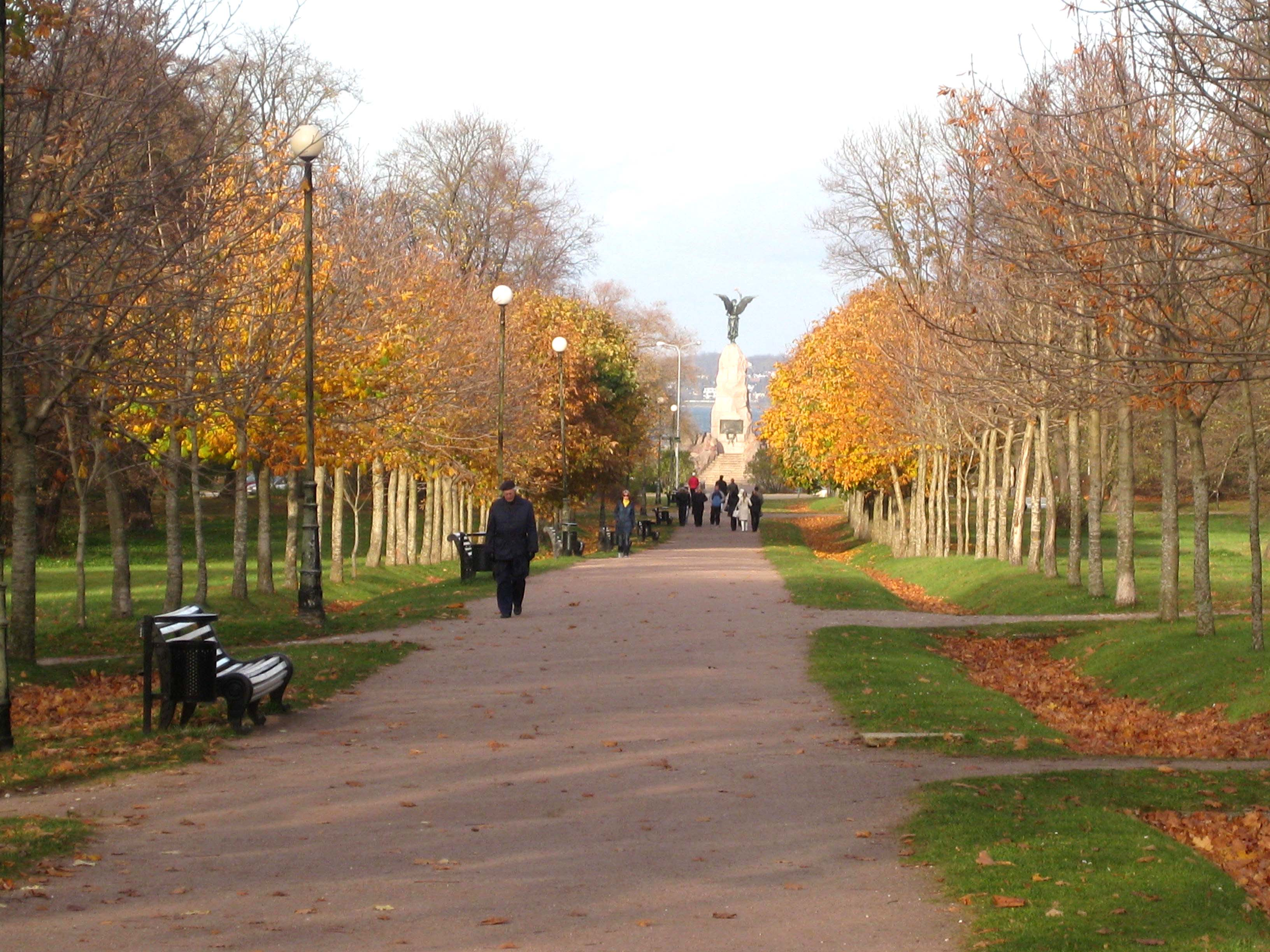
- Russalka Memorial seen from Kadriorg Park

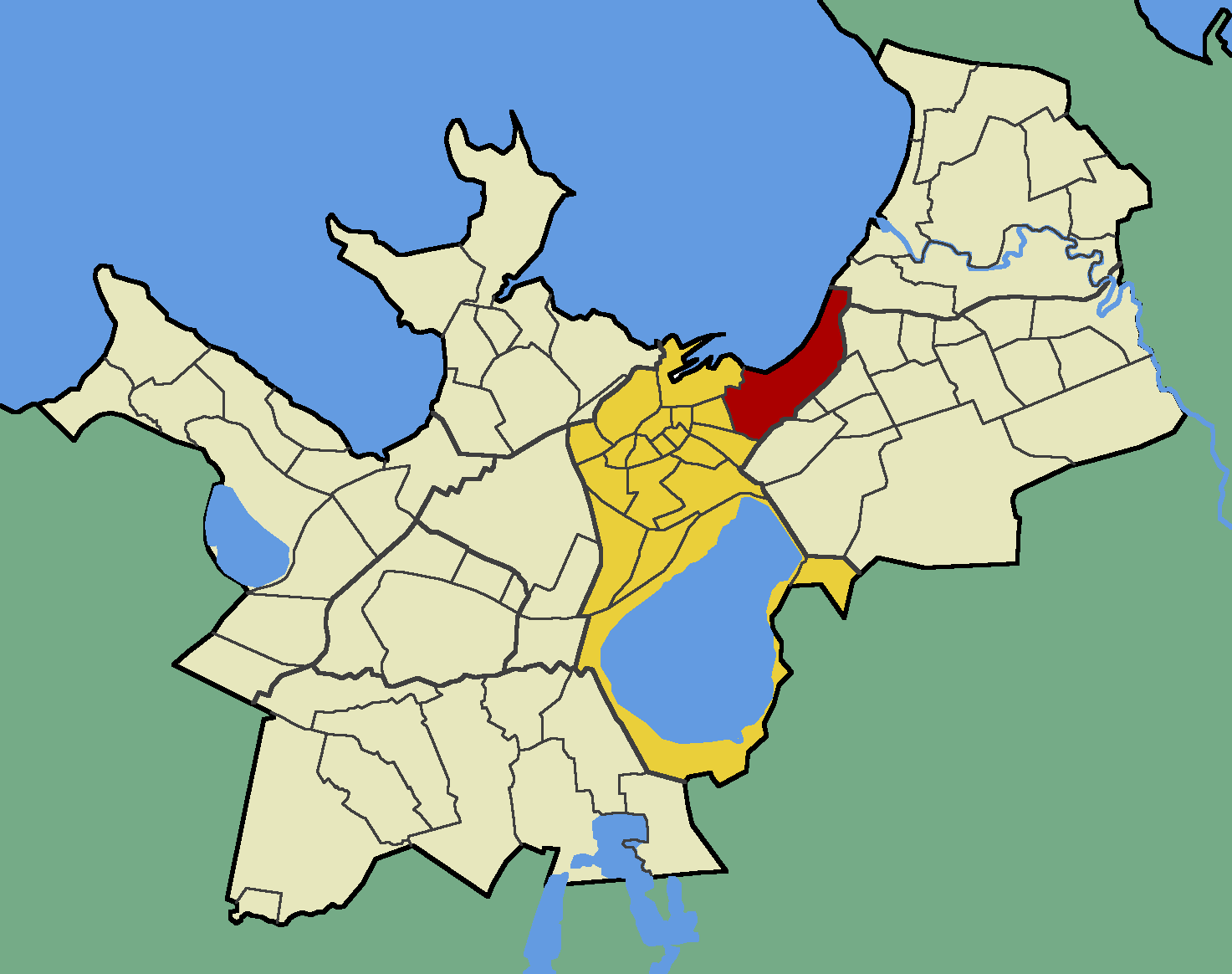
- Kadriorg within the district of Kesklinn (Midtown).
- Country: Estonia
- County: Harju County
- City: Tallinn
- District: Kesklinn

Population (01.01.2015)
  - Total: 4,561

Kadriorg (Estonian for 'Catherine's Valley') is a subdistrict in the district of Kesklinn ("Midtown"), Tallinn, the capital of Estonia. It has a population of 4,561 (As of 1 January 2015). The subdistrict name derives from the Catherinethal, a Baroque palace of Catherine I of Russia. It is one of the wealthiest neighbourhoods in Estonia.

Kadriorg is known for Kadriorg Palace and surrounding Kadriorg Park, commissioned by the Russian Czar Peter the Great. Nowadays, the park is a location of several museums including the Kadriorg Art Museum (a branch of the Art Museum of Estonia in Kadriorg palace), Kumu Art Museum, Mikkel, Peter the Great Museum and Eduard Vilde Museum. Nearby, close to the sea, is the Russalka Memorial which commemorates the loss of a Russian warship in 1893.

The official residence of the President of Estonia is situated next to Kadriorg Palace in the park.

== Gallery ==
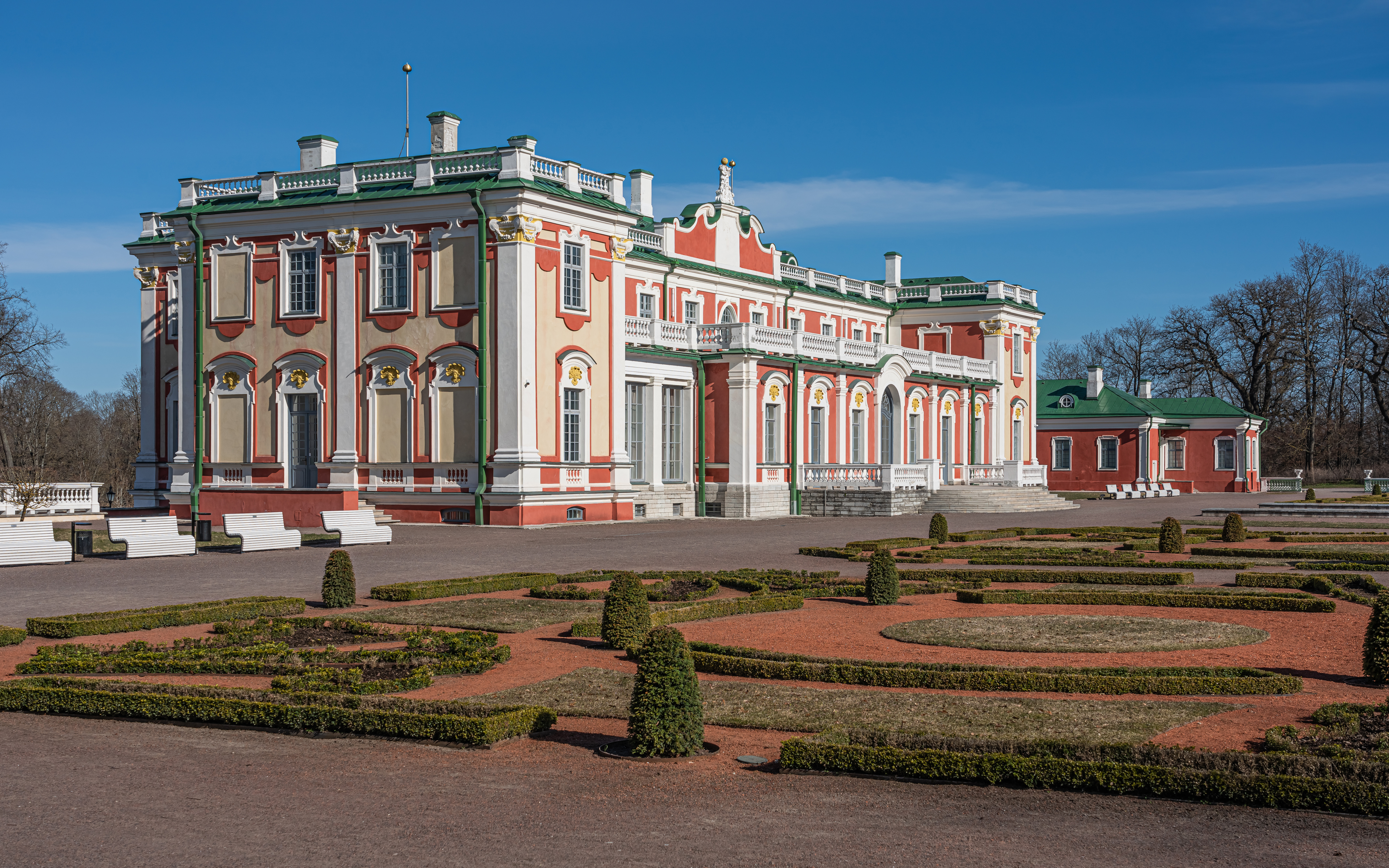
Kadriorg Palace

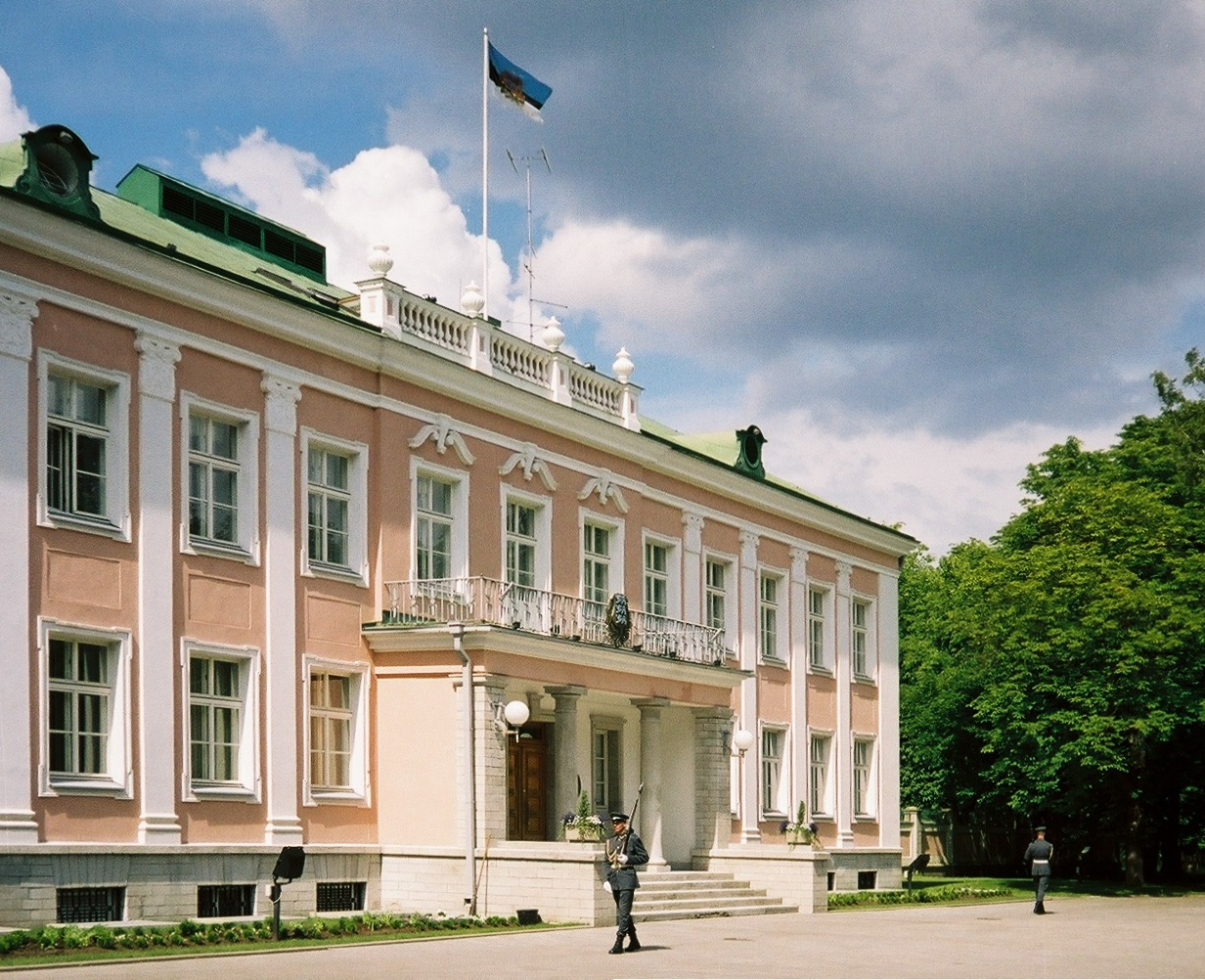
Presidential Palace

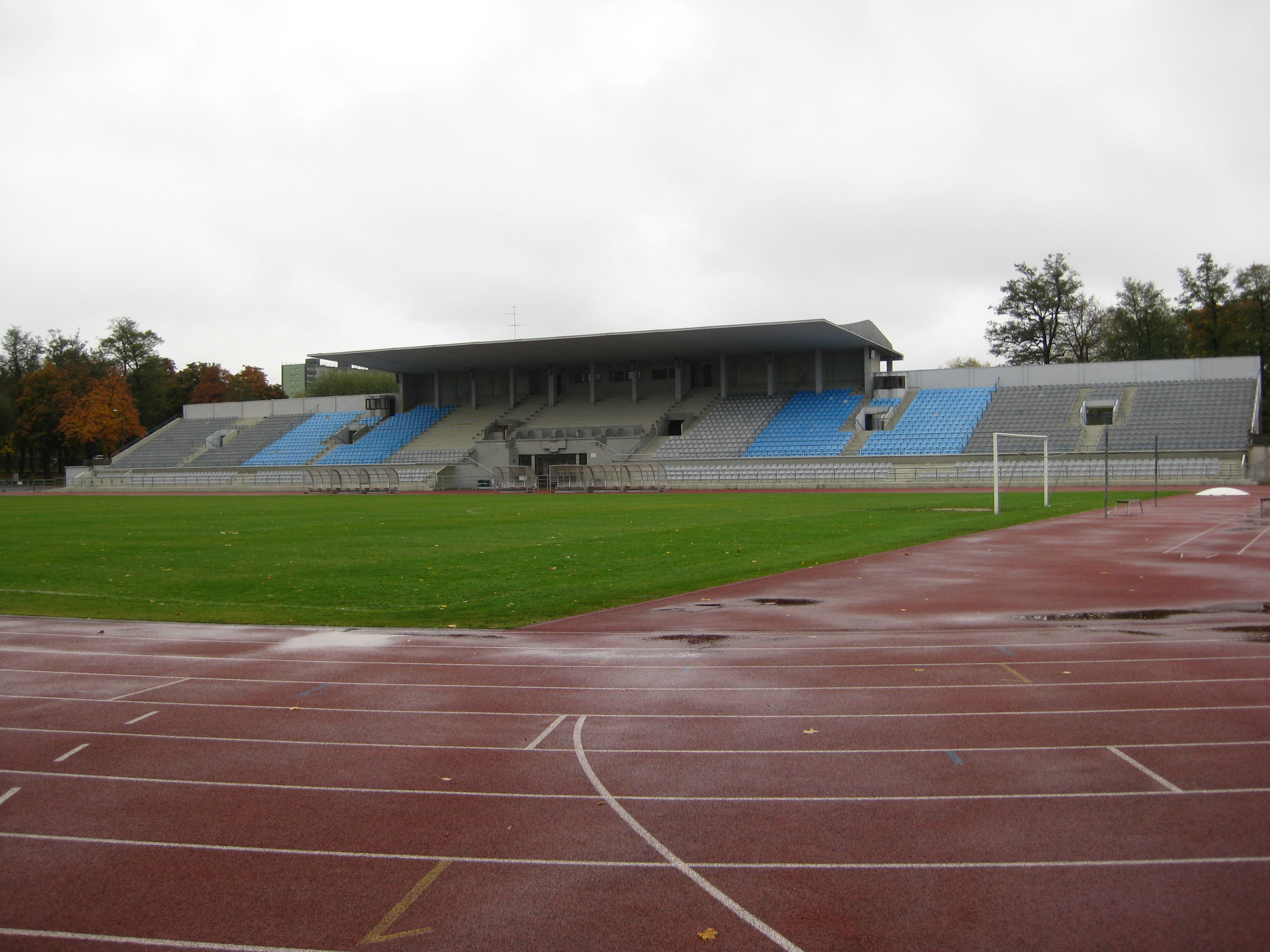
Kadrioru Stadium
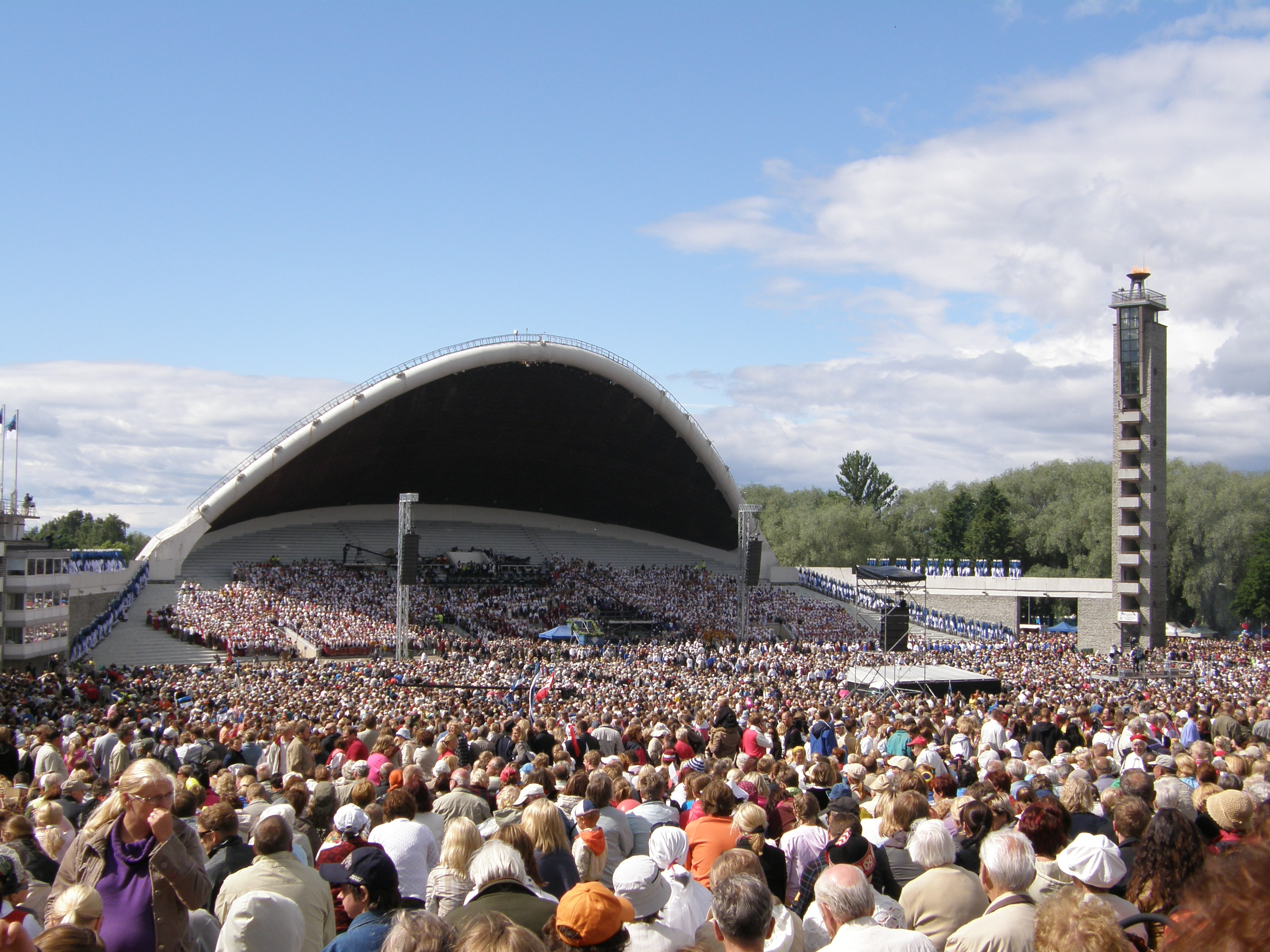
The Estonian Song Festival (Laulupidu) on the Tallinn Song Festival Grounds.

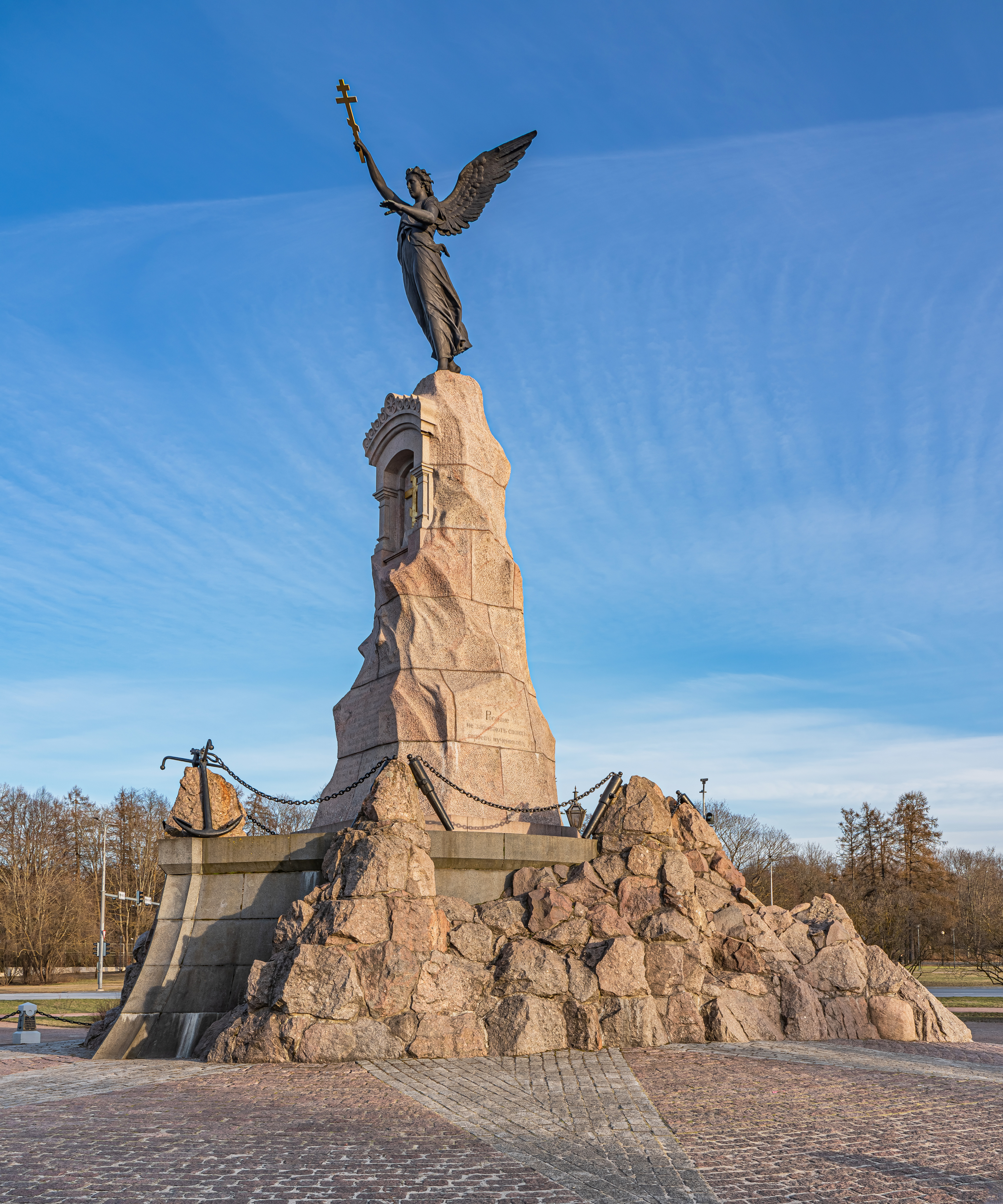
Russian monitor Rusalka memorial

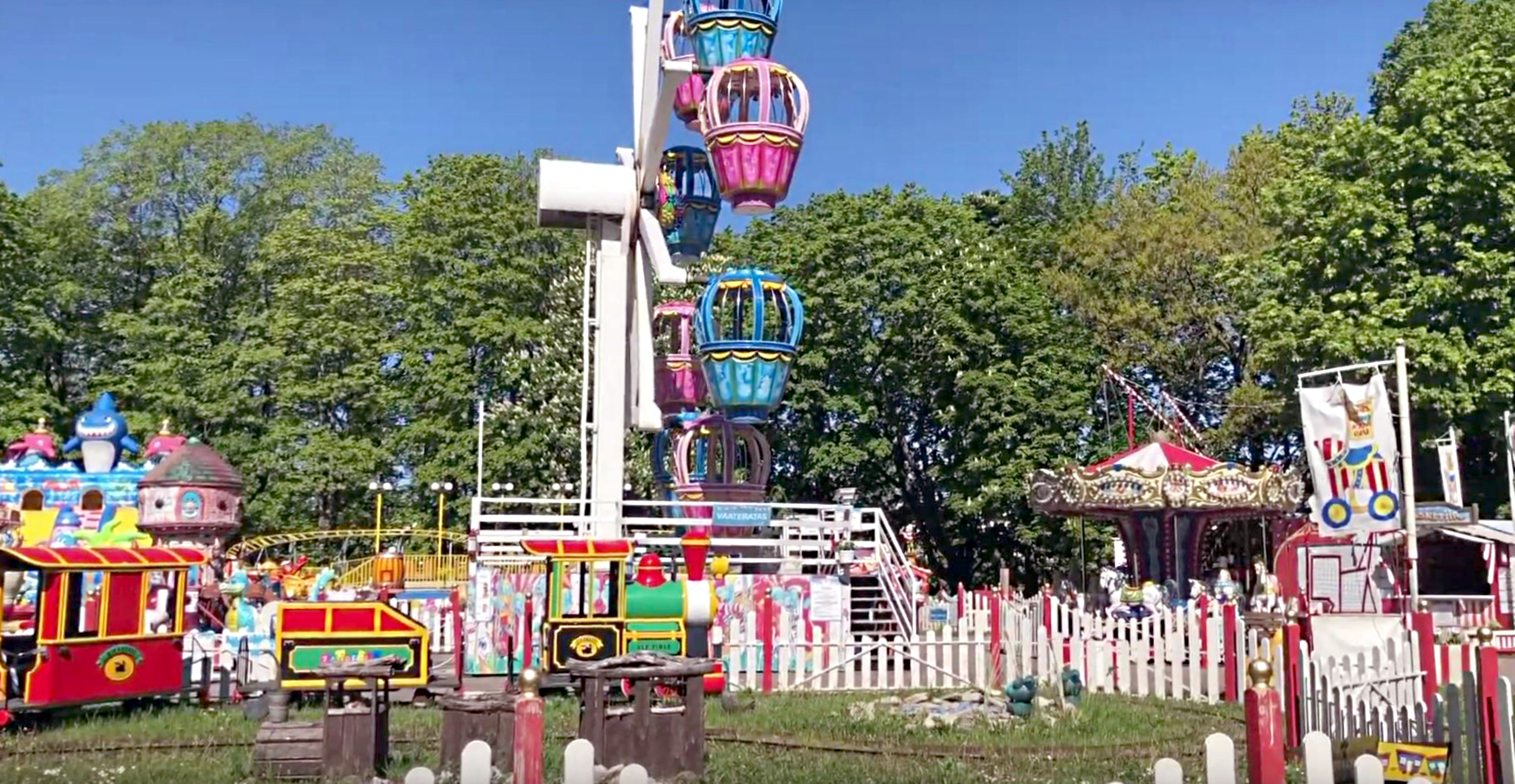
Luna Luna Amusement Park

Tram services
Preceding station	Trams in Tallinn	Following station
L. Koidula One-way operation	1	J. Poska towards Kopli
L. Koidula One-way operation	3	J. Poska towards Tondi
