= Jüri Käo =

Estonian entrepreneur (born 1965)

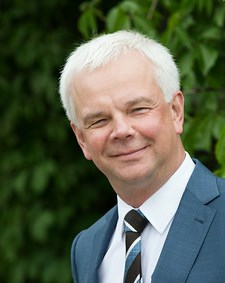
- Born: November 16, 1965 (age 60); Tallinn, then part of Estonian SSR, Soviet Union

Jüri Käo (born 16 November 1965 in Tallinn) is one of the managers and shareholders at NG Investeeringud, which is an industry, retail trade and real estate investment group based on Estonian private capital and employs more than 4300 people.

In 2009 the Äripäev business newspaper named Jüri Käo businessman of the year, earlier he has been named the most influential businessman in Estonia (in 2006 and 2007).

In 2001 the president of Estonia awarded Jüri Käo the Order of the White Star, 4th class and in 2006 the Order of the White Star, 2nd class for promoting business and contributing to Estonia becoming a member of the EU.

From 2016 Jüri Käo is the vice president of the Estonian Employers Confederation council. From 2013 to 2016 Jüri Käo was the president of the Estonian Employers Confederation council, from 2004 to 2013 he was the vice president of the said council. Before that, from 1997 to 2002 he was the chairman of the board and in 2002–2004 vice chairman of the board.

In 1997–2002 and 2007–2014 Jüri Käo was the chairman of the Eesti Energia AS council.

== Education ==
- 1972–1983 Tallinn School No. 21
- 1983–1988 Leningrad Transportation Institute, Mechanical Engineer

== Professional experience ==
- 1988-1990 Manufacturing community Norma, energetics specialist in the galvanics department
- 1990–1991 Collective enterprise Norma, department manager
- 1991–1992 Collective enterprise Norma, development director
- 1992–1994 Collective enterprise Norma, director general
- 1994–1996 Norma AS, director general/chairman of the board
- 1996–1999 Norma AS, chairman of the council
- Since 1994 NG Investeeringud OÜ, chairman of the board
- Since 2002 NG Kapital OÜ, chairman of the board
- Since 2000 OÜ Gotfried, member of the board

== Entrepreneurship ==
Sources:

- Since 1995 Balbiino AS, member of the council
- Since 1997 Tallinna Kaubamaja Group AS, chairman of the council
- Since 1997 Kitman Thulema AS, chairman of the council
- Since 1999 Tallinna Kaubamaja Kinnisvara AS, member of the council
- Since 2000-2007 Baltic Rail Services OÜ, member of the council
- Since 2000 Selver AS, member of the council
- Since 2000 Liviko AS, member of the council
- Since 2000 Roseni Majad OÜ, member of the board
- Since 2004 Tartu Kaubamaja Kinnisvara OÜ, member of the council
- Since 2005 Roseni Kinnisvara OÜ, member of the council
- Since 2007 KIA Auto AS, member of the council
- Since 2012 AS Viking Motors, member of the council
- Since 2012 TKM Auto OÜ, member of the council
- Since 2012 Kaubamaja AS, chairman of the council
- Since 2013 TKM King AS, chairman of the council (2009-2013 ABC King AS, chairman of the council)
- Since 2014 Viking Security AS, chairman of the council
- Since 2015 TKM Beauty OÜ. member of the chairman
- 2000-2007 Baltic Rail Services OÜ, member of the chairman
- 2001-2007 Estonian Railways Ltd, member of the chairman
- 1997-2002 Eesti Energia AS, chairman of the council
- 2007-2014 Eesti Energia, chairman of the council

== Membership in organisations and associations ==
Sources:

- 1995-2015 Estonian Chamber of Commerce and Industry, vice chairman of the board
- 1997–2002 The Estonian Employers' Confederation, chairman of the board
- 2002–2004 The Estonian Employers' Confederation, vice chairman of the board
- 2004–2013 The Estonian Employers' Confederation, vice president of the council
- 2013-2016 The Estonian Employers Confederation, president of the council
- Since 2016 The Estonian Employers' Confederation, vice president of the council

== Participation in non-profit and social organisations ==
Sources:

- Since 1997 Estonian Business Association, member
- 1993–2012 Estonian Autosport Union, member of the board
- Since 2000 Tallinn Yacht Club, vice commodore
- 2004–2012 Estonian Yachting Union, president
- 2012-2016 Estonian Yachting Union, member of the board
- 2008-2016 Estonian Olympic Committee, member of executive committee

== Recognitions ==
- 2001 Order of the White Star, 4th class
- 2006 Order of the White Star, 2nd class

== Interests ==
His interests include: Sailing, Hunting, and Motor sports.
