= NG Investeeringud =

Estonian financial services company

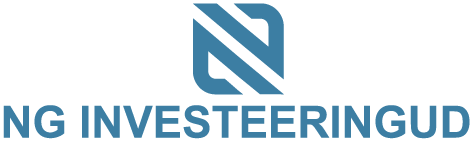
NG Investeeringud

OÜ NG Investeeringud is an industry, retail trade and real estate investment group based on Estonian private capital, which employs nearly 5400 people.

NG Investeeringud has a majority holding in the TKM Grupp and owns the ice cream producer Balbiino, alcoholic beverage producer Liviko, shop fittings and contract furniture manufacturer Kitman Thulema, real estate companies Roseni Majad and Roseni Kinnisvara.

Through the TKM Group, NG Investeeringud includes the following companies: Kaubamaja in Tallinn and Tartu, real estate companies TKM Kinnisvara and TKM Kinnisvara Tartu, supermarket chain Selver, Viimsi Keskus, beauty stores I.L.U., security company Viking Security and Viking Motors.

25 active subsidiaries in Estonia, Latvia, Lithuania and Finland belong to the NG Investeeringud group.

The majority shareholder of NG Investeeringud is NG Kapital with 68.75%, equal shareholders of which are Jüri Käo, Enn Kunila and the family of Andres Järving.

In 2023 NG Investeeringud group audited consolidated sales revenue totalled 1134,1 million euro.

== NG Investeeringud board ==
- Jüri Käo, Member of Board
- Enn Kunila, Member of Board
