= Olev Subbi =

Estonian artist

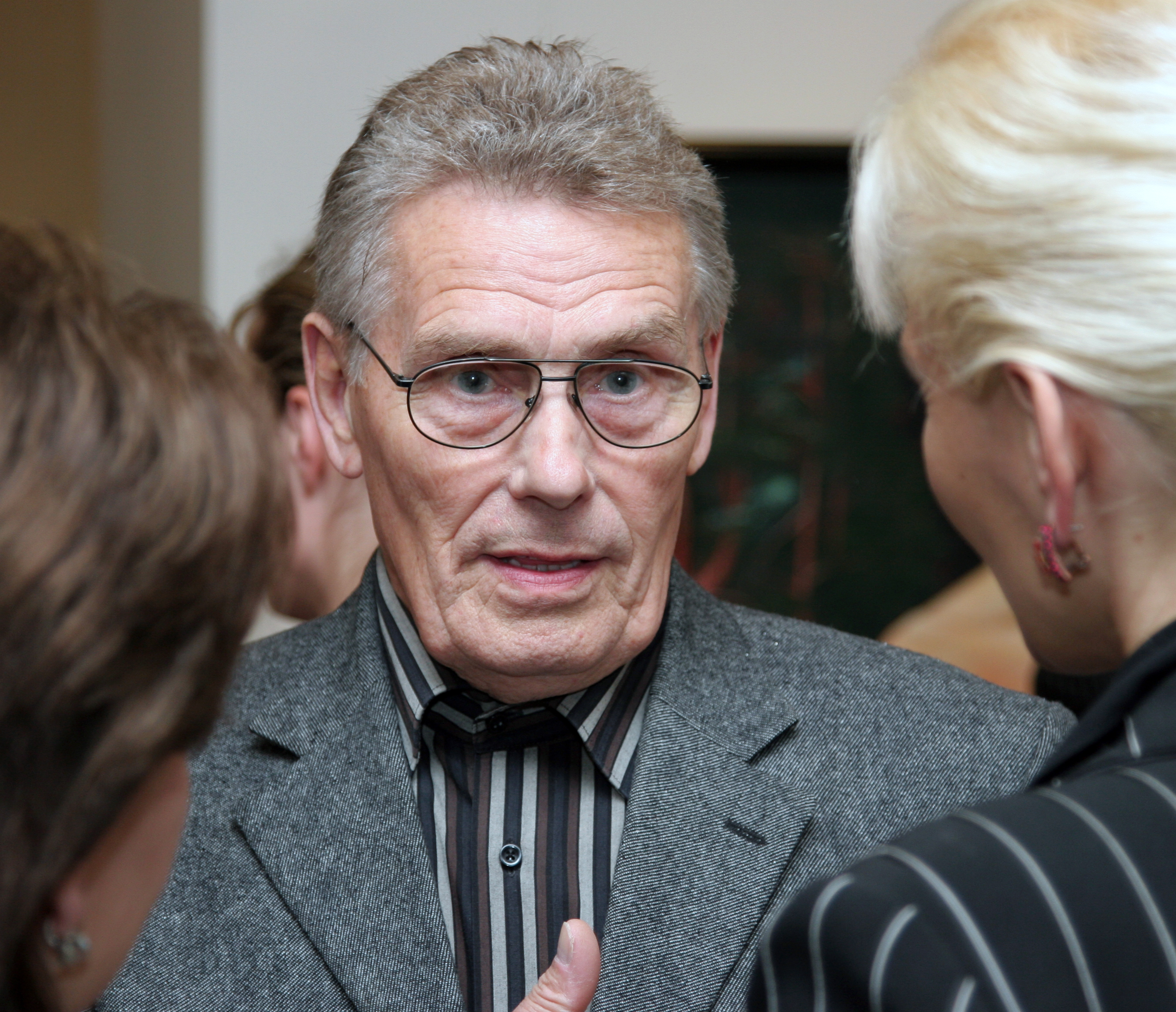
Olev Subbi in 2006

Olev Subbi (7 March 1930, Tartu – 19 August 2013) was an Estonian artist.

== Exhibitions ==
- 1991: Priebe Art Gallery, Oshkosh, Wisconsin
- 1991: Buena Vista College Art Gallery, Storm Lake, Iowa
