= Association of Estonian Food Industry =

Association of Estonian Food Industry (Estonian: Eesti Toiduainetööstuse Liit) is an Estonian organization which main goal is to enhance food industry of Estonia and to form balanced and ethical business environment between organization's members.

The organization was established in November 1993.

The leader of the organization is Sirje Potisepp.
