= Mikkel Museum =

Museum on Tallinn, Estonia

- Mikkeli muuseum

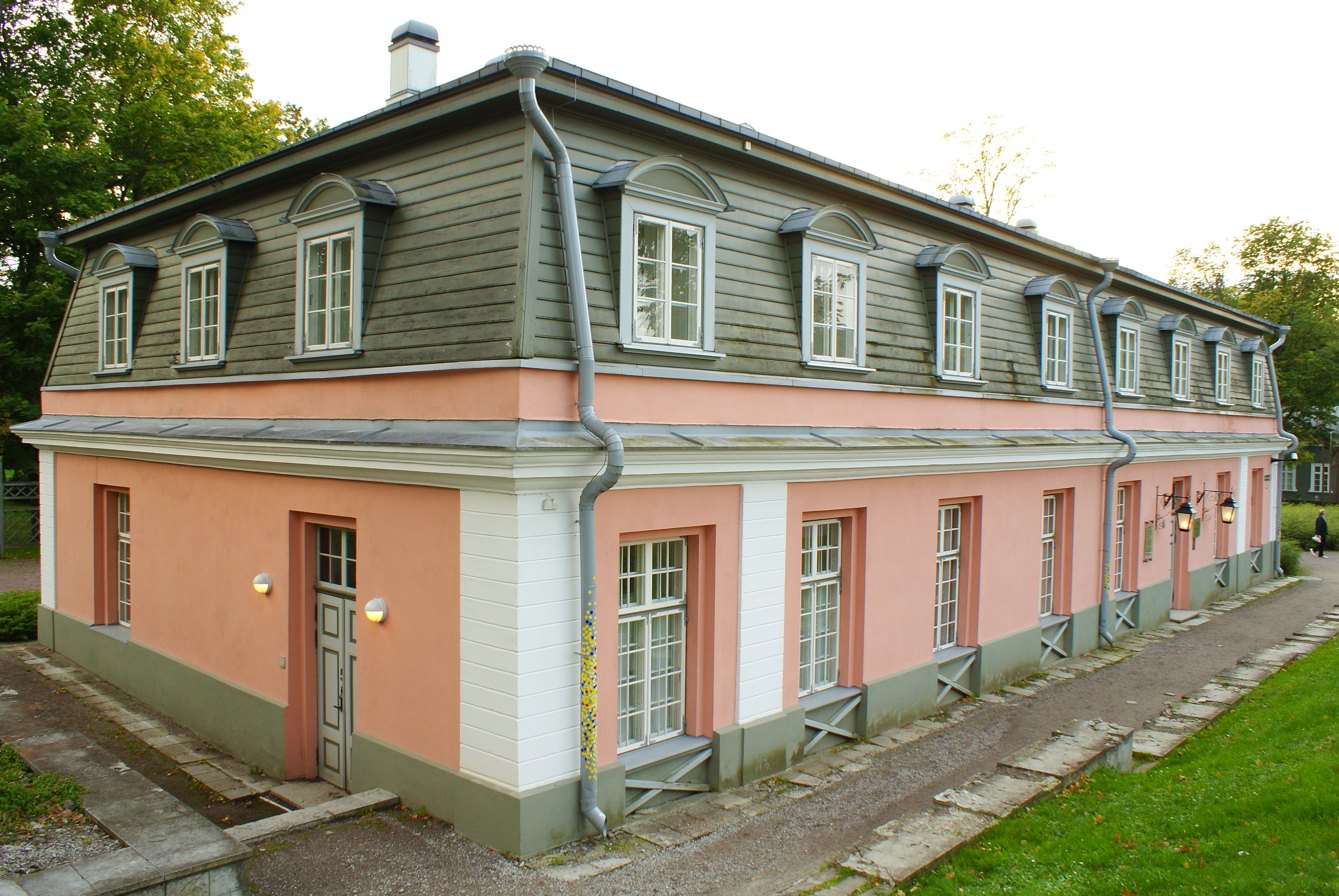
- The Mikkel Museum is housed in the former Kadriorg palace kitchen building
- Established: 25 June 1997
- Location: Weizenbergi 28, Tallinn, Estonia
- Coordinates: 59°26′16.7″N 24°47′26.6″E
- Type: Art museum
- Collections: Western art, Chinese porcelain
- Collection size: 600
- Visitors: 10,744 (2013)
- Founder: Johannes Mikkel
- Curator: Marie Johanson
- Public transit access: Kadriorg, TLT
- Website: www.mikkelimuuseum.ee

The Mikkel Museum is a branch of the Art Museum of Estonia (Estonian: Eesti Kunstimuuseum), located in Kadriorg park in Tallinn. It displays a collection of mainly Western art and ceramics, and Chinese porcelain, donated by art collector Johannes Mikkel in 1994.

== History ==
The museum was founded to house the art collection of Johannes Mikkel, who in 1994 had donated his collection of foreign art to the Art Museum of Estonia. Johannes Mikkel (1907–2006) came from southern Estonia, studied various subjects (including art) at the University of Tartu and worked, after World War II, in Tallinn as a manager in several antique shops. Through his vast network he was able to assemble the collection of the present museum. In 1996, the former kitchen building (built 1754) of nearby Kadriorg Palace, where the Art Museum of Estonia's main collection of foreign art is displayed, was renovated to house the Mikkel collection.

== Collection ==
The museum contains about 600 objects. The nucleus of the collection is the large amount of Western graphic art from the 16th to 19th centuries, with a special focus on the Dutch Golden Age. The part of the collection devoted to graphics include works by Albrecht Dürer, Lucas Cranach, Rembrandt, Claude Lorrain, Adriaen van Ostade, Jacob van Ruisdael and Félicien Rops. A substantial part of the collection is also devoted to paintings from roughly the same time span; including works by Melchior d'Hondecoeter and Jean François de Troy, as well as a portrait from the studio of Anthony van Dyck.

In addition to pictures, the collection also displays a set of European ceramics and Chinese porcelain. The Mikkel collection is the only place in Estonia to house a representative European ceramics collection, spanning several centuries. The core of the collection are several pieces of Meissen porcelain, but it also features pieces of Sèvres porcelain, Royal Copenhagen porcelain and Russian Imperial porcelain. The Chinese porcelain collection is focused on blue-and-white porcelain.
