= Art Museum of Estonia =

National art museum

Coordinates: 59°26′11.56″N 24°47′49.16″E

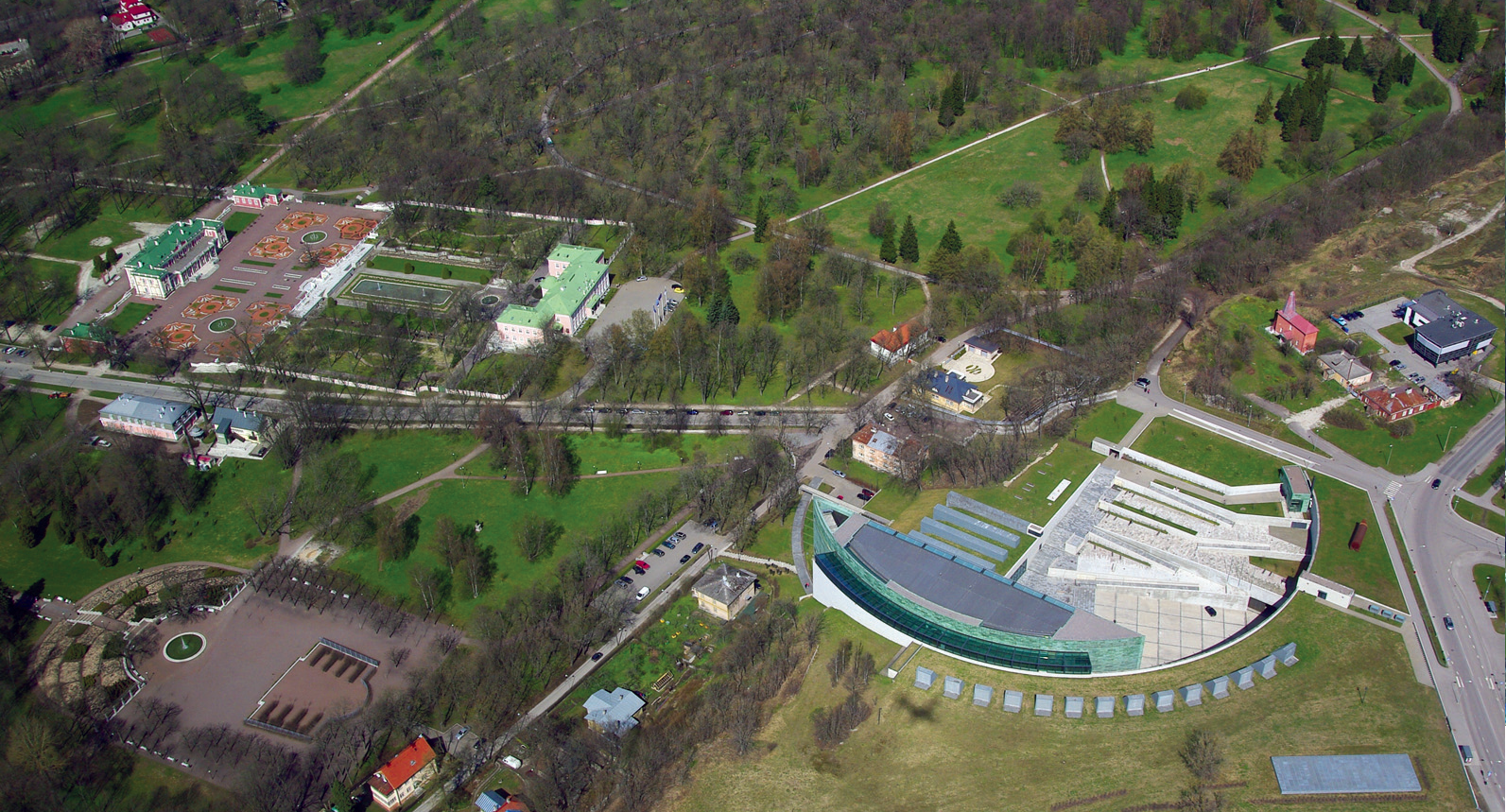
- Kumu Art Museum, the main building of the Art Museum of Estonia
- Established: 1919
- Location: Tallinn, Estonia
- Type: Art museum

The Art Museum of Estonia (Estonian: Eesti Kunstimuuseum) was established in 1919. Originally based in Kadriorg Palace, the museum has expanded across several sites and today exhibits both international and local art works. At the end of the 1970s, in the 1980s the first branches of the Art Museum of Estonia were founded. Starting in 1995, all of the branches offer different educational programmes for children and young people. In 1996, the exhibition hall on the first floor of Rotermann Salt Storage was opened; this branch was closed in May 2005.

== Overview ==
Art Museum of Estonia consists of the following branches:

- In the Kadriorg park area:
  - Kumu Art Museum (main building of the Estonian Art Museum) - it displays Estonian art from the 18th century until now.
  - Kadriorg Art Museum – located in Kadriorg Palace, it displays the largest and most important collections of Russian and Western European art spanning from the 16th to 20th centuries.
  - Mikkel Museum - displays the art collection of Johannes Mikkel.
- Elsewhere in Tallinn:
  - Niguliste Museum (housed in former St. Nicholas' Church) – displays a collection of historical ecclesiastical art spanning nearly seven centuries, including medieval and post-Reformation art in Estonia.
  - Adamson-Eric Museum – displays the work of Adamson-Eric, one of the most outstanding painters in Estonia. The collection comprises his paintings, ceramics, leatherwork, jewellery, textiles and furniture. The museum was opened in 1983.

== Gallery ==
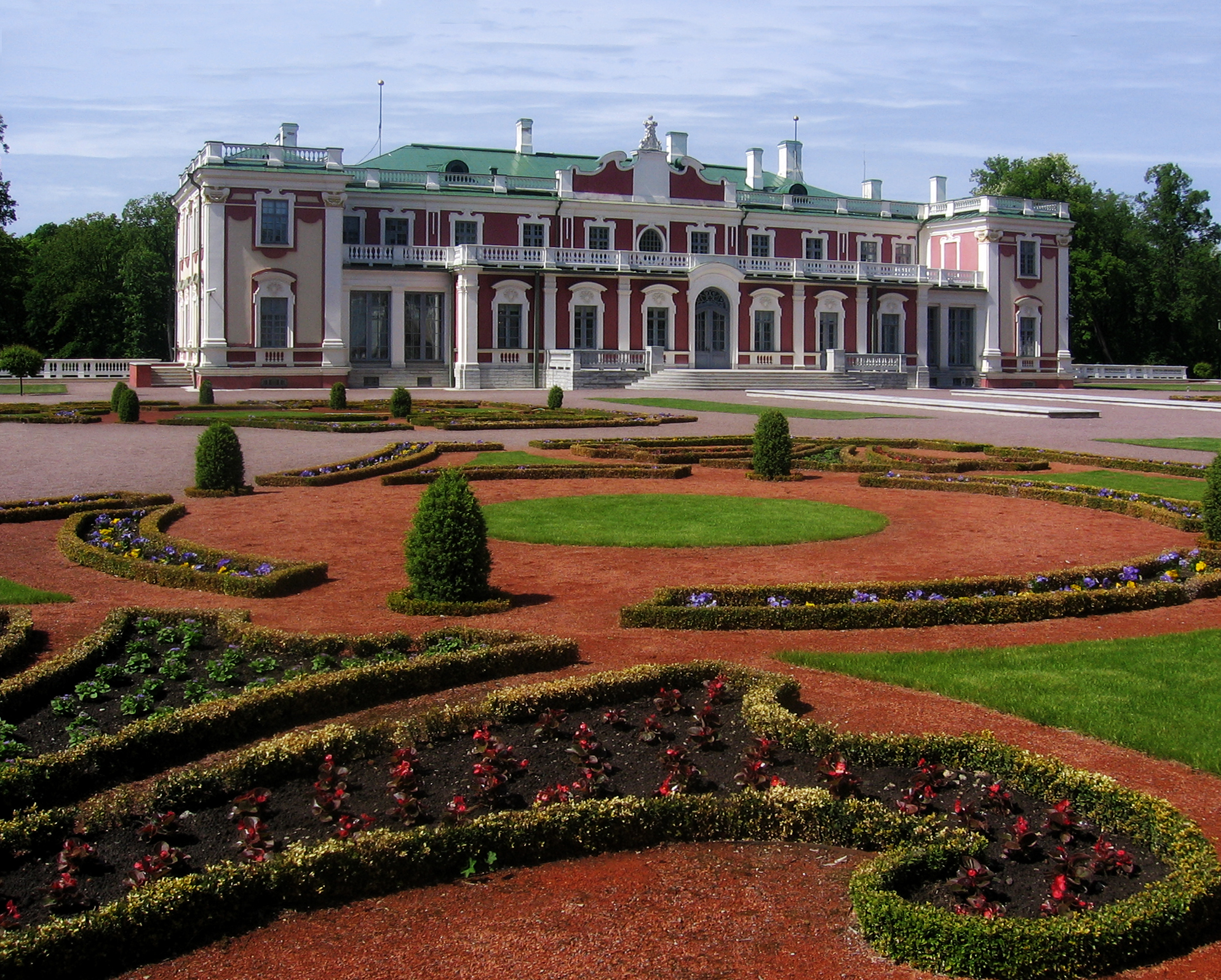
Kadriorg Palace

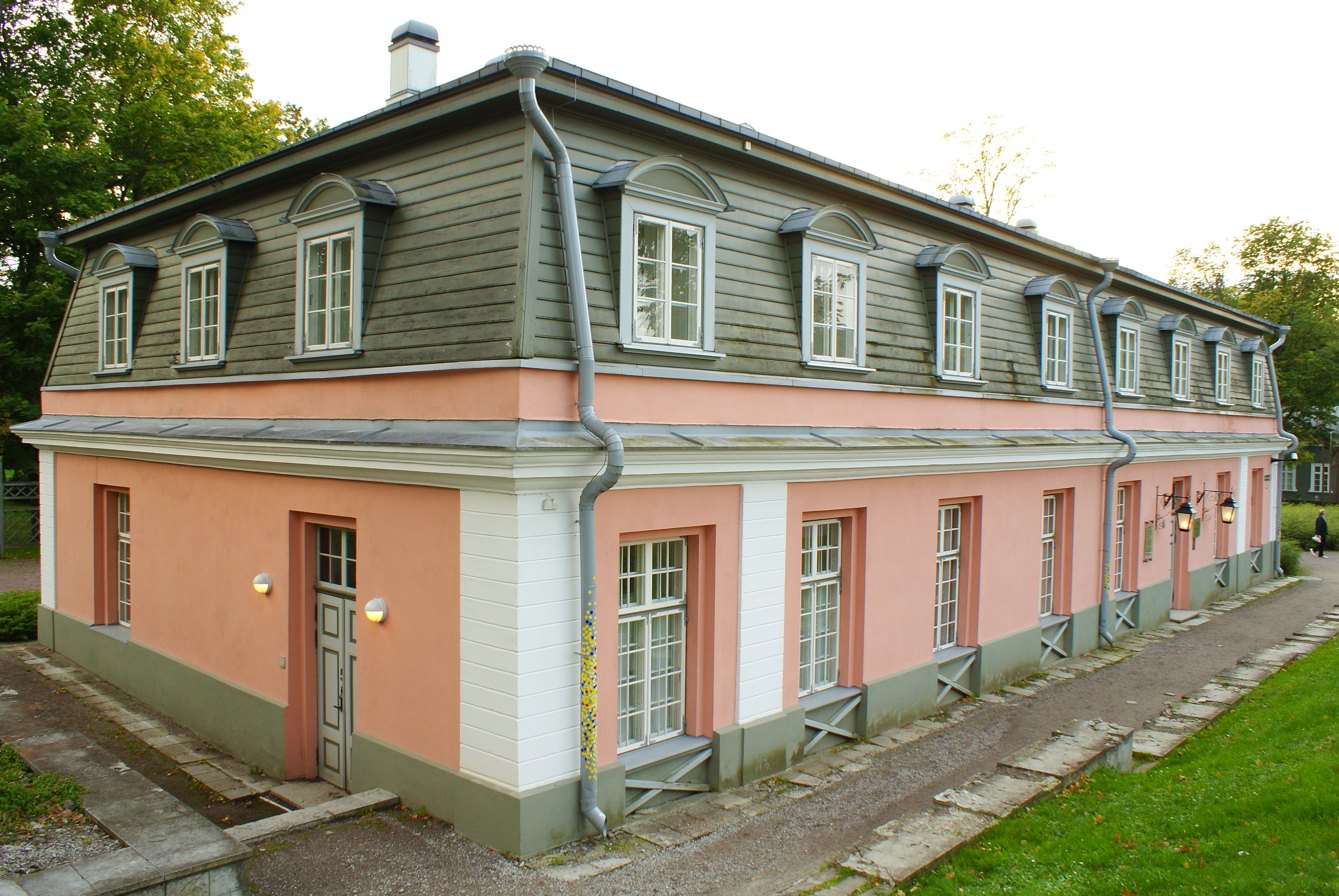
Mikkel Museum

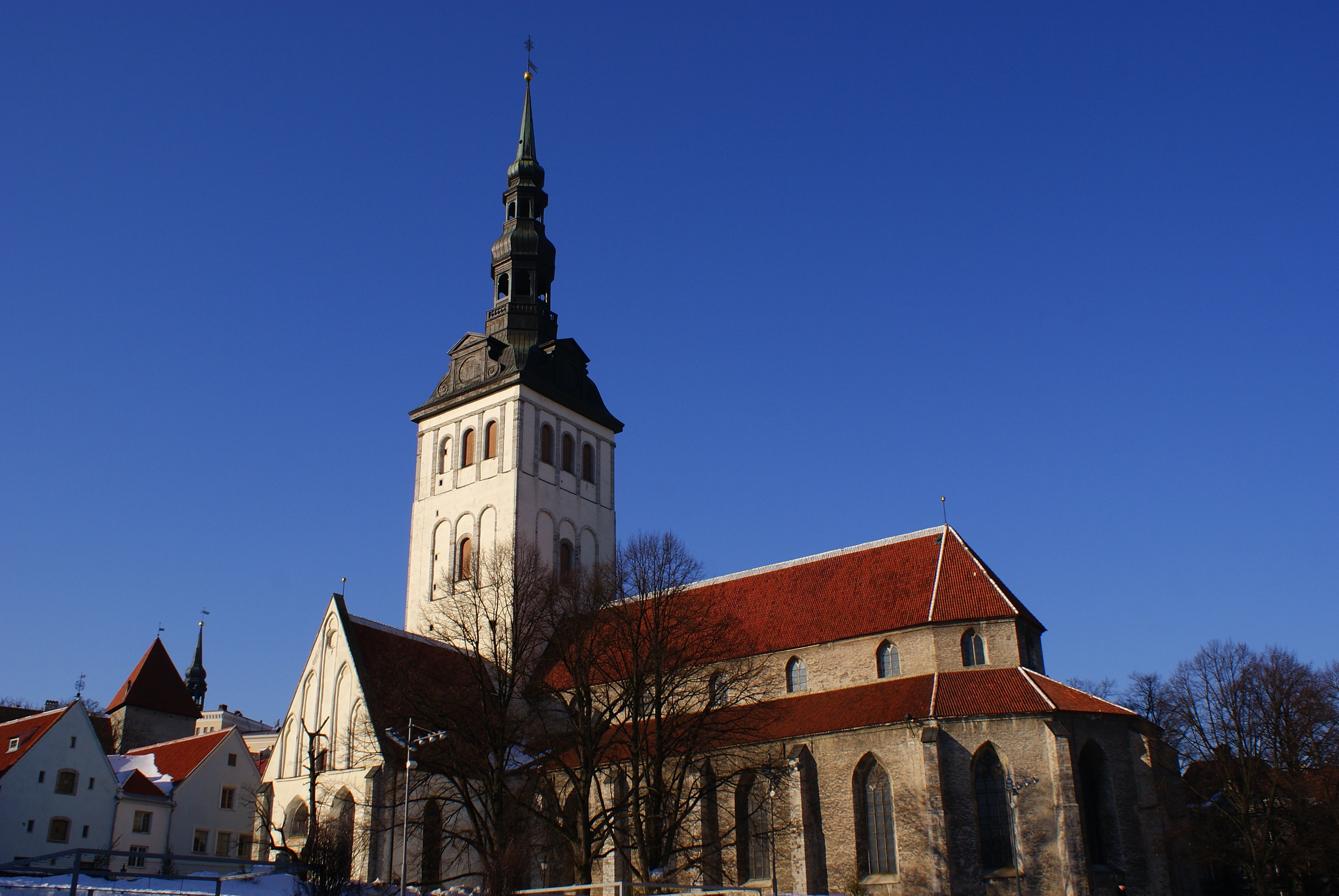
Niguliste Museum

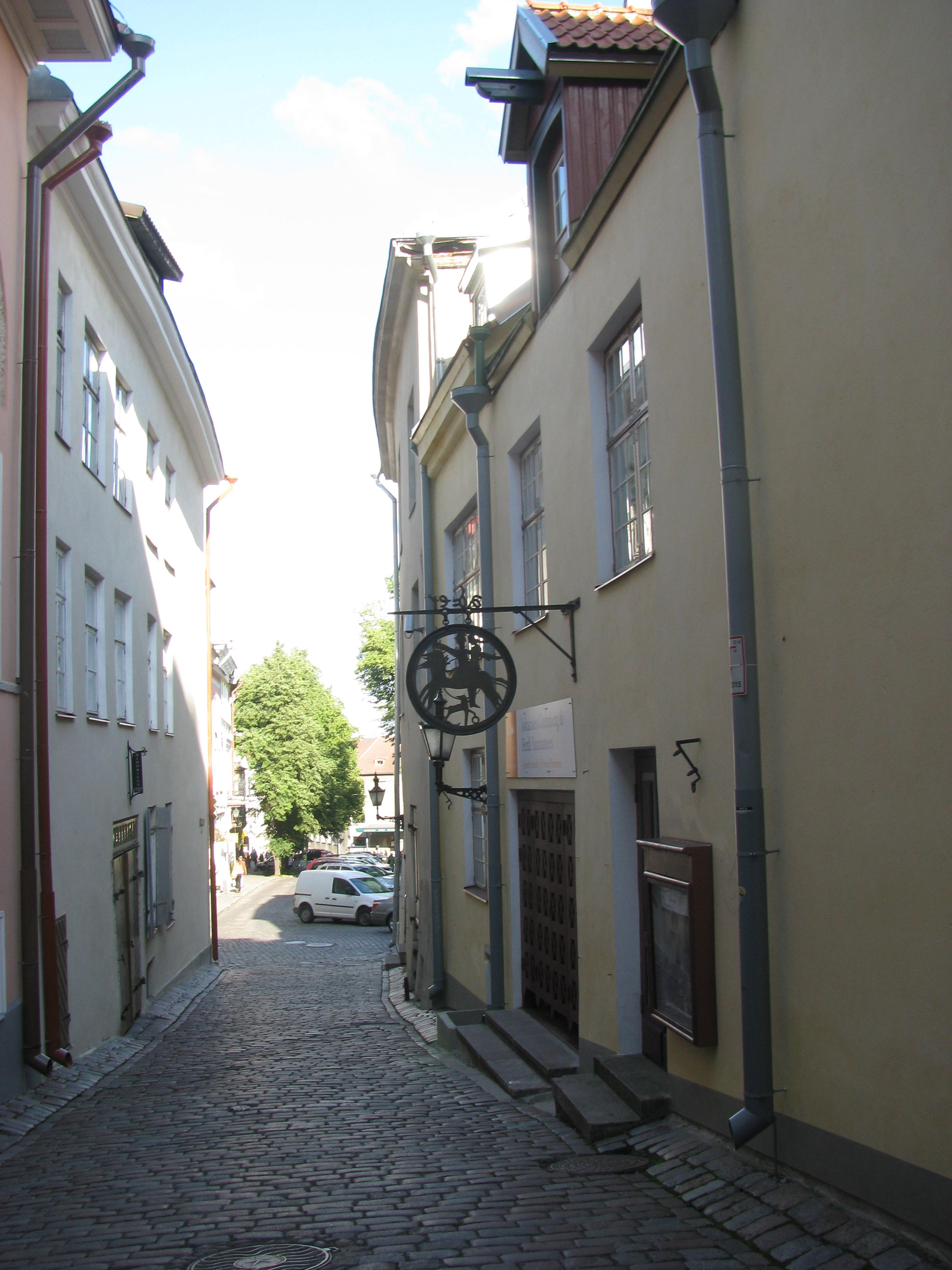
Adamson-Eric Museum

== See also ==
- List of museums in Estonia
