= Tartu County =

County of Estonia

Coordinates: 58°22′N 26°43′E

Tartu County Tartumaa
- County
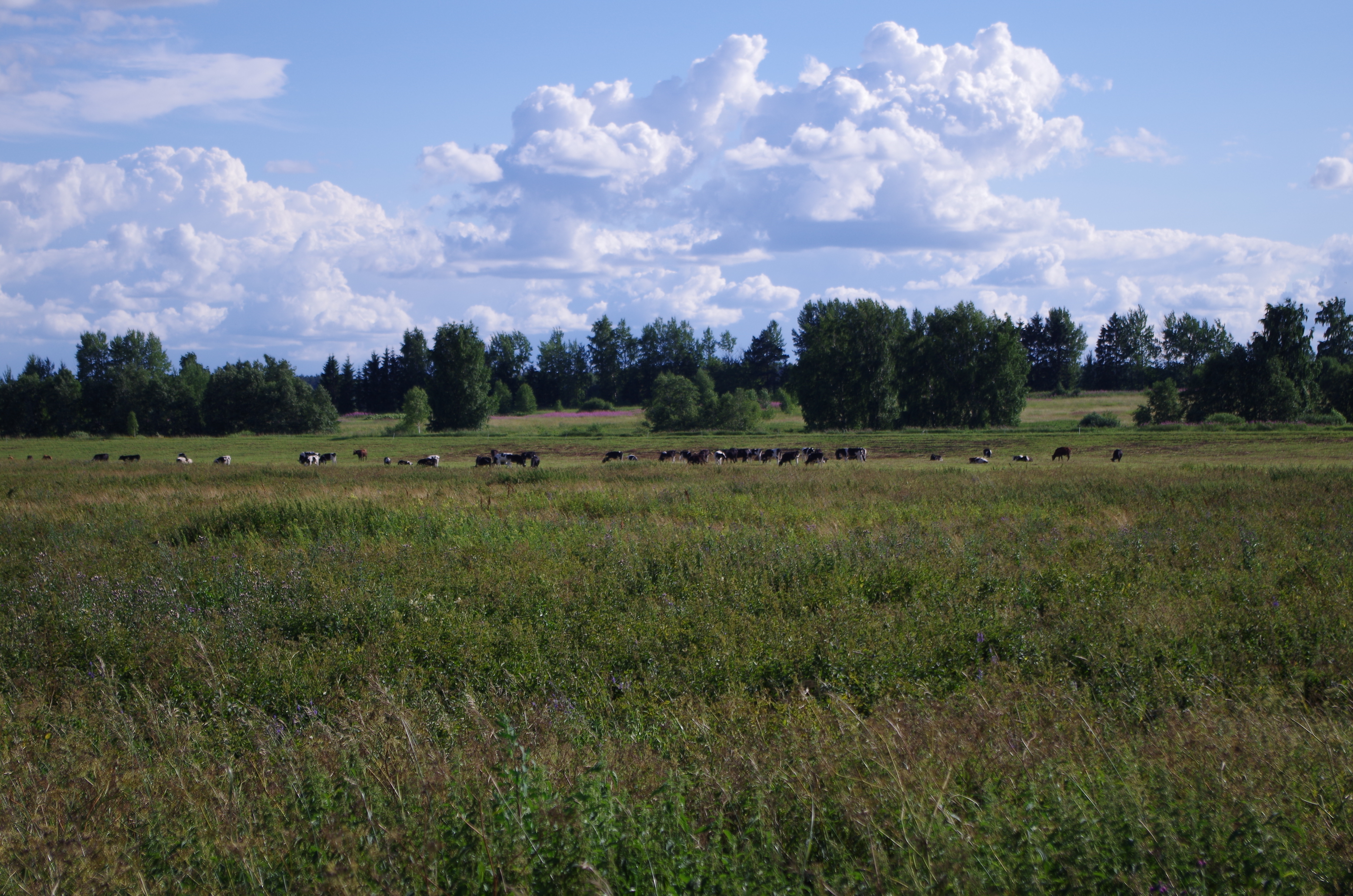

- Flag Coat of arms

- Country: Estonia
- Capital: Tartu

Area
  - Total: 2,992.75 km^{2} (1,155.51 sq mi)

Population (2022)
  - Total: 157,758
  - Rank: 2nd
  - Density: 52.7134/km^{2} (136.527/sq mi)

Ethnicity
  - Estonians: 84.4%
  - Russians: 10.1%
  - other: 2.9%

GDP
  - Total: €4.186 billion (2022)
  - Per capita: €26,151 (2022)
- ISO 3166 code: EE-79
- Vehicle registration: T

Tartu County (Estonian: Tartu maakond or Tartumaa) is one of 15 counties of Estonia.

It is located in eastern Estonia, and it borders Põlva County, Valga County, Viljandi County, and Jõgeva County.

The area of Tartu County is 2,992.74 km^{2} (1,155.50 sq mi), which covers 6.9% of the territory of Estonia. In 2022 Tartu County had a population of 157,758 – constituting 11.9% of the total population in Estonia. The city of Tartu is the centre of the county located at a distance of 186 km (116 mi) from Tallinn. Tartu County is divided into 8 local governments – 1 urban and 7 rural municipalities.

== Geography ==
Tartu County lies in South Estonia, between Lake Võrtsjärv and Lake Peipus. Estonia's only navigable river, the Emajõgi (100 km long), flows through the county, connecting Lake Peipus and Lake Võrtsjärv. Wavy plains are typical landscapes of Tartu County. One-third of the county is covered with forests, and a third is cultivated. A quarter is made up of wetlands at the headwaters and lower course of the Emajõgi. In the northern part of the county, there are drumlin fields with lakes between them. Nature reserves, such as Pähklisaar Nature Reserve, Emajõe Suursoo, and Alam-Pedja, take up about 10% of the county's territory.

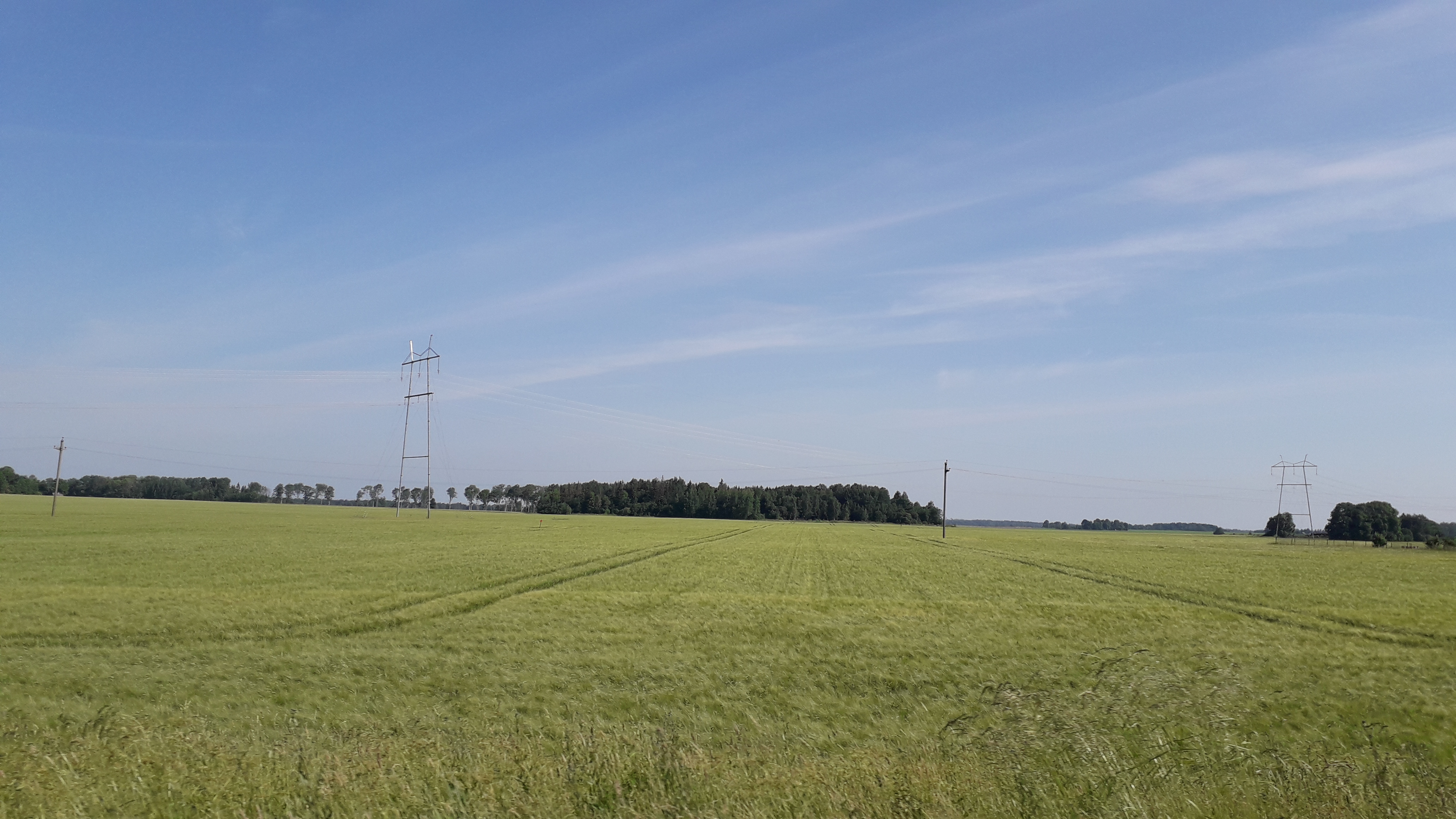
Landscape in the western part of Tartu county

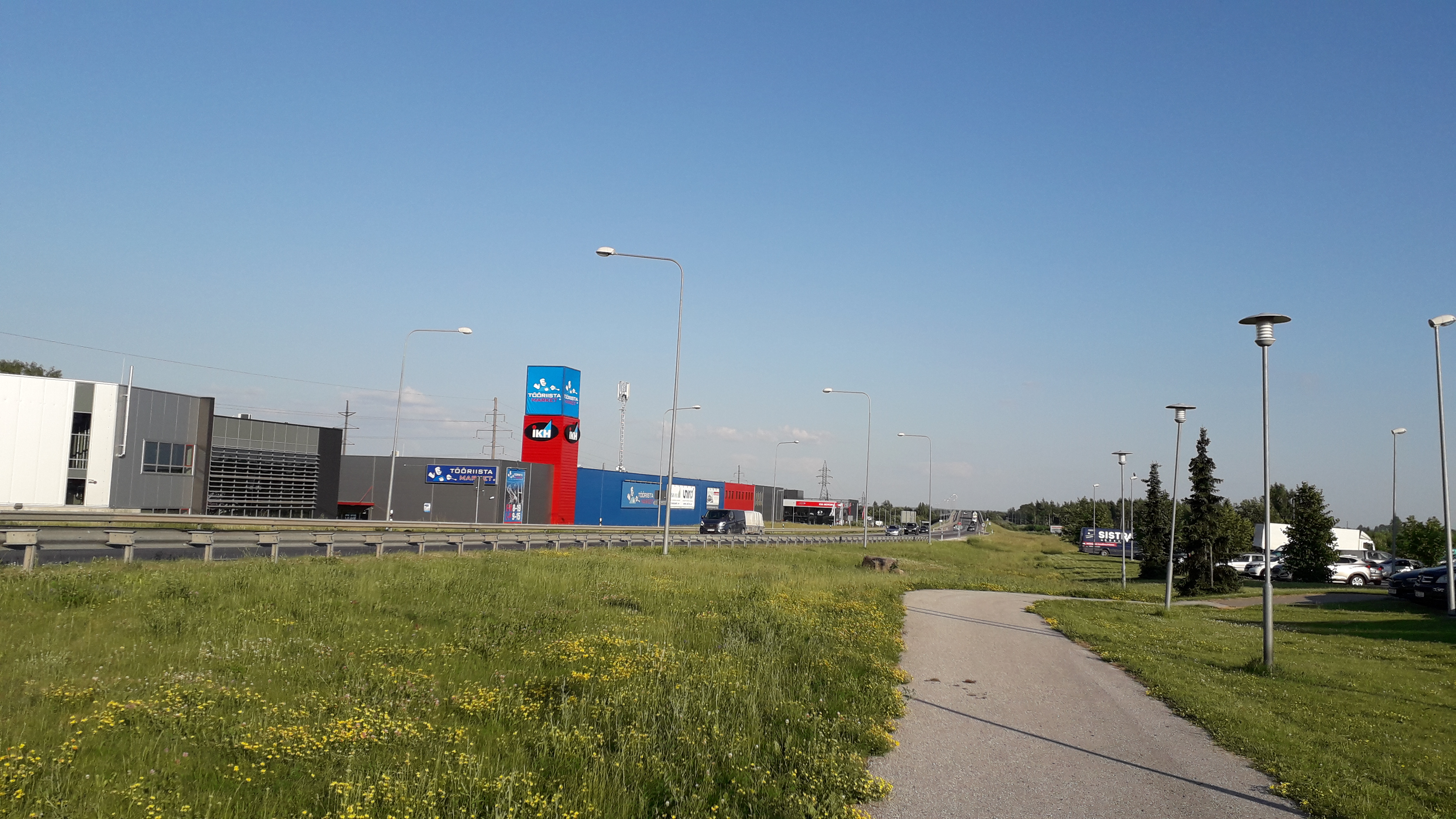
View of the road from the border of the city of Tartu towards Võru

== History ==
Archaeological findings suggest that people first inhabited the territory of the current Tartu County about 5000 years ago. The city of Tartu was first mentioned in historical records in 1030, when Yaroslav I the Wise organized a military campaign against Chuds, defeated them and established fort Yuryev in what is modern day Tartu. In 1224, after the conquest of the stronghold by the German invaders, Tartu became the capital of a diocese, stretching from Northern Estonia to Latvia. Since the 13th century, Tartu belonged to the Hanseatic League, and the town became a well-known trade centre in the Baltic Sea region. In 1569, together with Duchy of Livonia, Tartu became part of the Polish–Lithuanian Commonwealth. In 1598 Tartu became capital of the Dorpat Voivodeship, which remained part of the PLC until the 1620s, when the city was conquered by the Swedes.

King Gustavus Adolphus of Sweden established the University of Tartu in 1632. Estonia's first teachers' training school was established in Tartu County in 1684, as well as the first Estonian schools for the children of peasants. Closed during and after the Great Northern War, Tartu University was re-opened in 1802 as the only university operating in German language in the Russian Empire. Economic development of the region was further encouraged by the construction of the railway connecting Tartu with Tallinn, Riga and St. Petersburg. In the second half of the 19th century, the national awakening of Estonians began from Tartu region. After Estonia gained independence in 1918, Tartu, along with Tallinn, became one of the two main cultural centres of Estonia, where most of the Estonian intelligentsia of the time lived and worked. In 1987–1989, the students' environmental and cultural heritage movement in Tartu initiated Estonia's Singing Revolution and restoration of the country's independence.

== Economy ==
Tartu County is an integrated economic system and labour area with its centre in the City of Tartu.

There are 6000 companies and 2000 self-employed persons registered in Tartu County. More than 80% of the companies employ 10 or fewer people, only 5 companies in the whole region have more than 250 employees.

Service sector provides 2/3 of the employment in the county. The City of Tartu is the service and logistics centre for the whole of South Estonia. A significant part of these jobs are in the public sector – especially education and medicine – and the biggest employer in the county is Tartu University Clinics with around 3000 employees, incl 455 doctors. The biggest private sector employer is Tarmeko, producing furniture and components, with 900 employees. Unemployment rate in the county has been 2–3% in the recent years.

Typical products of Tartu County are furniture, foodstuffs, clothes, building materials, glass and plastics. The main export target countries are Finland, Germany, Latvia and Russia. 40% of the exports is wood and furniture, other export production includes machinery and appliances, building materials, glass and clothing. Thanks to the fertile lands, there are many big agricultural enterprises in the West of the county. Fishery is an important activity on the coast of Lake Peipus.

There is development potential for knowledge intensive production in the region due to its universities. Some successful spin-offs of Tartu University are operating in the field of biotechnology and biomedicine. Since 2004, several ICT companies, orientated on the international markets, have been growing fast.

In order to facilitate innovation and technology transfer, Tartu Science Park is offering incubation and consultation services to research-based and high-tech oriented companies, and promoting cooperation between research institutions. Tartu University Institute of Technology is a research and development institution, which aims to facilitate the generation of new technological solutions. The R&D centres have been established in the areas of material and chemical technology, biomedical technology, environmental technology and information technology.

The key actors of the region have signed an agreement about the county's development strategy, which is economic and social development through increase of the knowledge input into production and services.

Economic development priorities:

1. Modernization of studying and working environment, technologies and methods in the schools and universities; internationalization of the universities; development of vocational and technical education;
2. support of entrepreneurship and start-ups, increase of knowledge input to the production;
3. improvement of living environment and social infrastructure of regional centres in the rural areas;
4. enhancement of international availability by roads, transport and communications networks.

== Education and culture ==
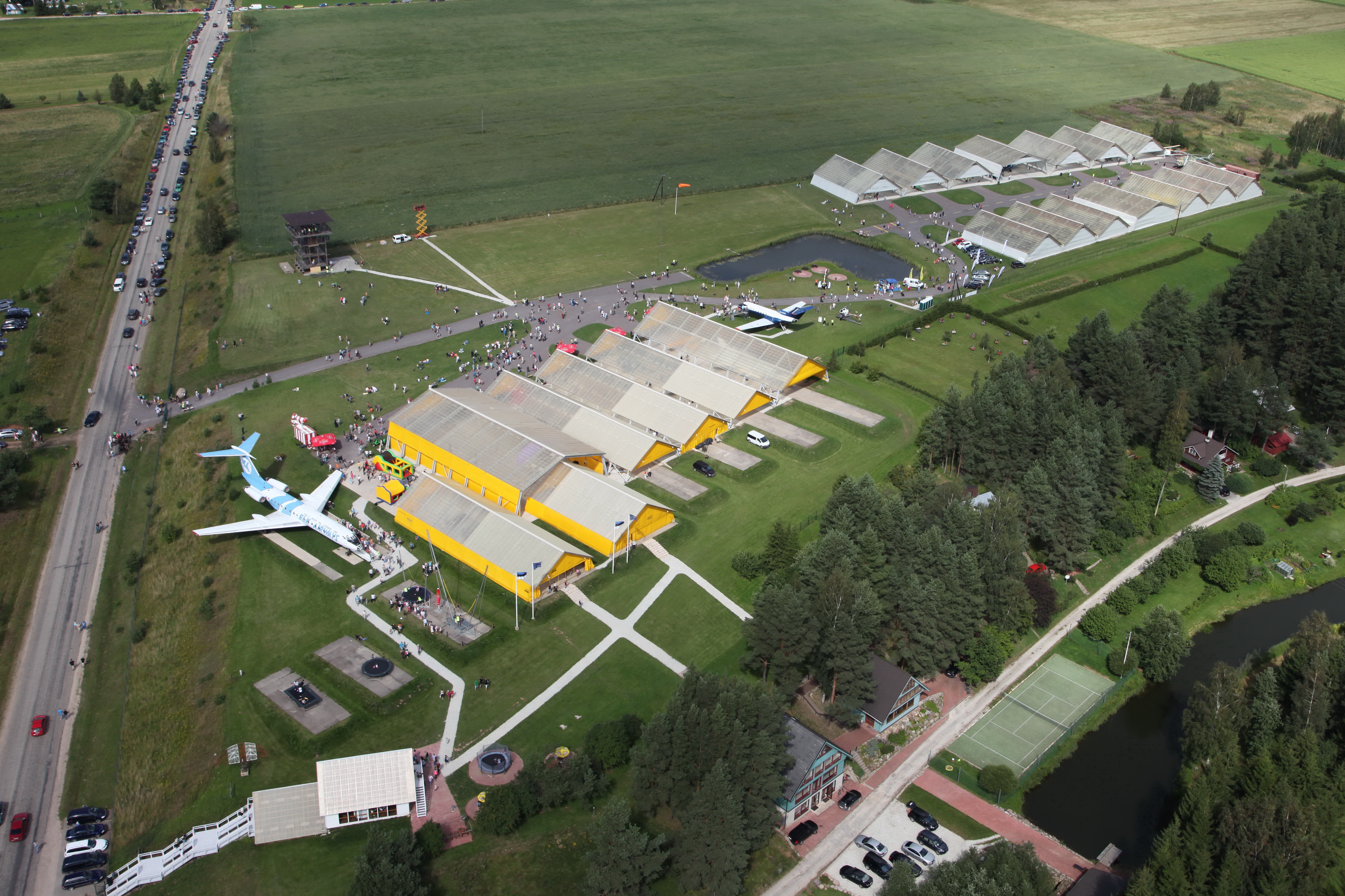
Estonian Aviation Museum

Tartu County has 69 schools with approximately 23,000 pupils. 11 vocational schools provide practical training in 50 specialities. 40% of Estonia's students live and study in Tartu. In addition to the University of Tartu and the Estonian University of Life Sciences there are 9 other institutions of higher education, the most recent of them the Baltic Defence College.

In the City of Tartu, Estonia's oldest professional theatre, Vanemuine, stages drama, opera and ballet. In 1869 the first Estonian Song Festival was held in Tartu, starting a tradition of choral song festivals which are now held in Tallinn every 4 years with 15,000–30,000 participants. Today Tartu Song Festival arena hosts various open-air concerts in summer. There are over 30 museums and art galleries in Tartu County, including Tartu City Museum, Tartu Art Museum, Toy Museum, Estonian Sports and Olympic Museum, Estonian Postal Museum, Estonian Aviation Museum, Estonian Museum of Agriculture, Old-Believers' Museum of Living History, and others. Biggest and most important of them is Estonian National Museum, that was founded in 1909. Student festivals and Hanseatic festivals take place in Tartu regularly. The best known sports event hosted by Tartu County is the Tartu Ski Marathon, which is a member of the Worldloppet series.

== Government ==
In Estonia, there is no regional self-government on county level. Until 2017 the County Governments (Estonian: Maavalitsus) were led by County Governors (Estonian: maavanem), who were appointed by the National Government.

In accordance with the Government of the Republic Act, the County Governor represented interests of the state in the county and provides for integral and balanced development of the county. The County Governor co-ordinated co-operation of ministries and other organs of executive power located in a county with its local governments and performs supervision over the activities of the local governments. The County Governor was appointed for a five-year term by the Government of the Republic, on the basis of the Prime Minister's proposal and in co-ordination with the representatives of the local governments.

On February 2, 2006, Esta Tamm was appointed Tartu County Governor. She assumed office February 15, 2006.

The County Government managed the operations of and provides support services to the County Governor; prepared draft documents required by the County Governor; managed and controlled the execution of orders of the County Governor; managed the preparation of draft budgets of state agencies administered by the County Government, and controlled adherence to the budgets; managed relations of the County Governor with government agencies and local government agencies.

== Municipalities ==
The county is subdivided into municipalities. As of 2017, there is 1 urban municipality (Estonian: linn – "town") and 7 rural municipalities (Estonian: vald) in Tartu County.

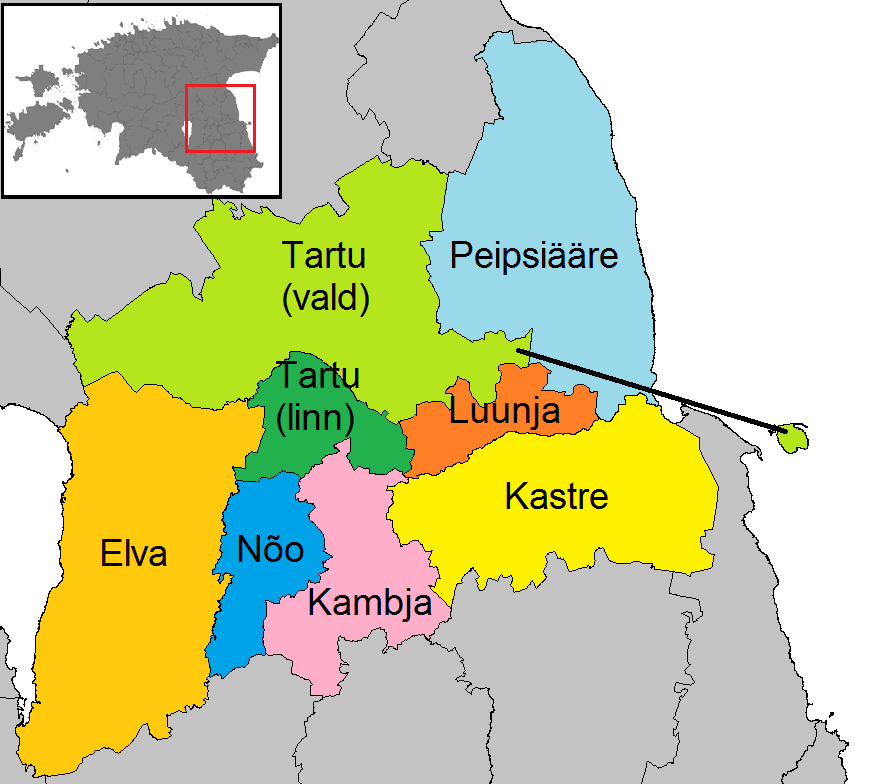
Municipalities of Tartu County

Rank	Municipality	Type	Population (2018)	Area km^{2}	Density
1	Elva Parish	Rural	14,612	728	20.1
2	Kambja Parish	Rural	10,511	276	38.1
3	Kastre Parish	Rural	5,138	495	10.4
4	Luunja Parish	Rural	4,503	132	34.1
5	Nõo Parish	Rural	4,274	169	25.3
6	Peipsiääre Parish	Rural	5,676	652	8.7
7	Tartu Parish	Rural	10,676	742	14.4
8	Tartu	Urban	99,429	154	645.7

== Religion ==
The following congregations of the Estonian Evangelical Lutheran Church (EELC) operate in Tartu County under EELC's Tartu Deanery: Alatskivi, Kambja, Kodavere, Vara, Võnnu, Äksi, Tartu St. Mary's, Tartu University-St. John's, Tartu Finnish, Tartu St. Paul's and Tartu St. Peter's congregations. The following congregations operate under EELC's Valga Deanery: Rõngu, Elva, Nõo and Puhja congregations.

As for the Eastern Orthodox Church, under the administration of the Tallinn Diocese of the Estonian Apostolic Orthodox Church there are Kavilda, Nõo, Tartu Saint Alexander's congregations and Tartu Dormition of the Mother of God Cathedral congregation. The following Eastern Orthodox congregations operate under the jurisdiction of the Estonian Orthodox Church of the Moscow Patriarchate: Nina and Tartu congregation of St.George-the-Conqueror.

There are Old Believer congregations in Raja, Kallaste, Kasepää, Suur-Kolkja, Väike-Kolkja, Kükita, Piirissaar, Varnja and in the city of Tartu.

The congregation belonging to the Catholic Church in Estonia that operate in Tartu County are: Tartu Immaculate Conception congregation and Tartu Ukrainian congregation. Catholic masses are also held in the Chapel of St. Luigi Gonzaga.

There are 8 Baptist congregations in the county. Several Adventist, Methodist, Pentecostal and Jehovah's Witnesses congregations operate in the county.

Of the other religions, an Estonian Neopagan congregation and a Buddhist congregation operate in the county.

Religious affiliations in Tartu County, census 2000–2021*
Religion	2000		2011		2021	
Religion	Number	%	Number	%	Number	%
Christianity	30,601	25.0	27,514	22.3	24,460	19.0
—Orthodox Christians	8,223	6.7	9,292	7.5	7,890	6.1
—Lutherans	18,967	15.5	14,480	11.8	12,720	9.9
—Catholics	594	0.4	469	0.3	800	0.6
—Baptists	551	0.4	580	0.4	630	0.5
—Jehovah's Witnesses	426	0.3	394	0.3	450	0.3
—Pentecostals	134	0.1	109	0.08	110	0.08
—Old Believers	1,472	1.2	1,439	1.1	1,270	1.0
—Methodists	80	0.06	73	0.05	120	0.09
—Adventists	154	0.1	137	0.1	90	0.07
—Other Christians	-	-	541	0.4	380	0.3
Islam	61	0.04	93	0.07	90	0.07
Buddhism	-	-	188	0.1	210	0.1
Other religions**	894	0.7	1,014	0.8	1,950	1.5
No religion	55,265	45.2	77,571	61.6	85,750	66.5
Not stated***	35,347	28.9	19,293	15.3	16,200	12.5
Total population*	122,168		125,889		128,870	
*The censuses of Estonia count the religious affiliations of the population older than 15 years of age. ".

== Gallery ==
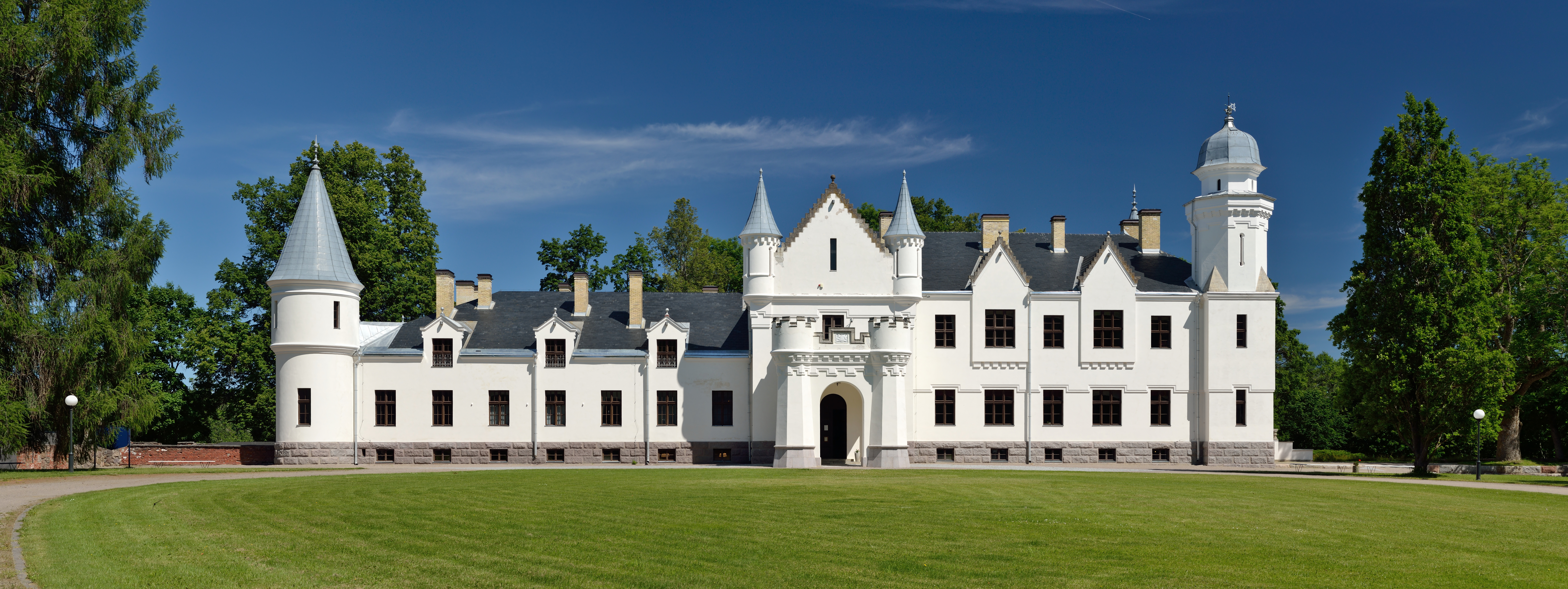
Alatskivi manor

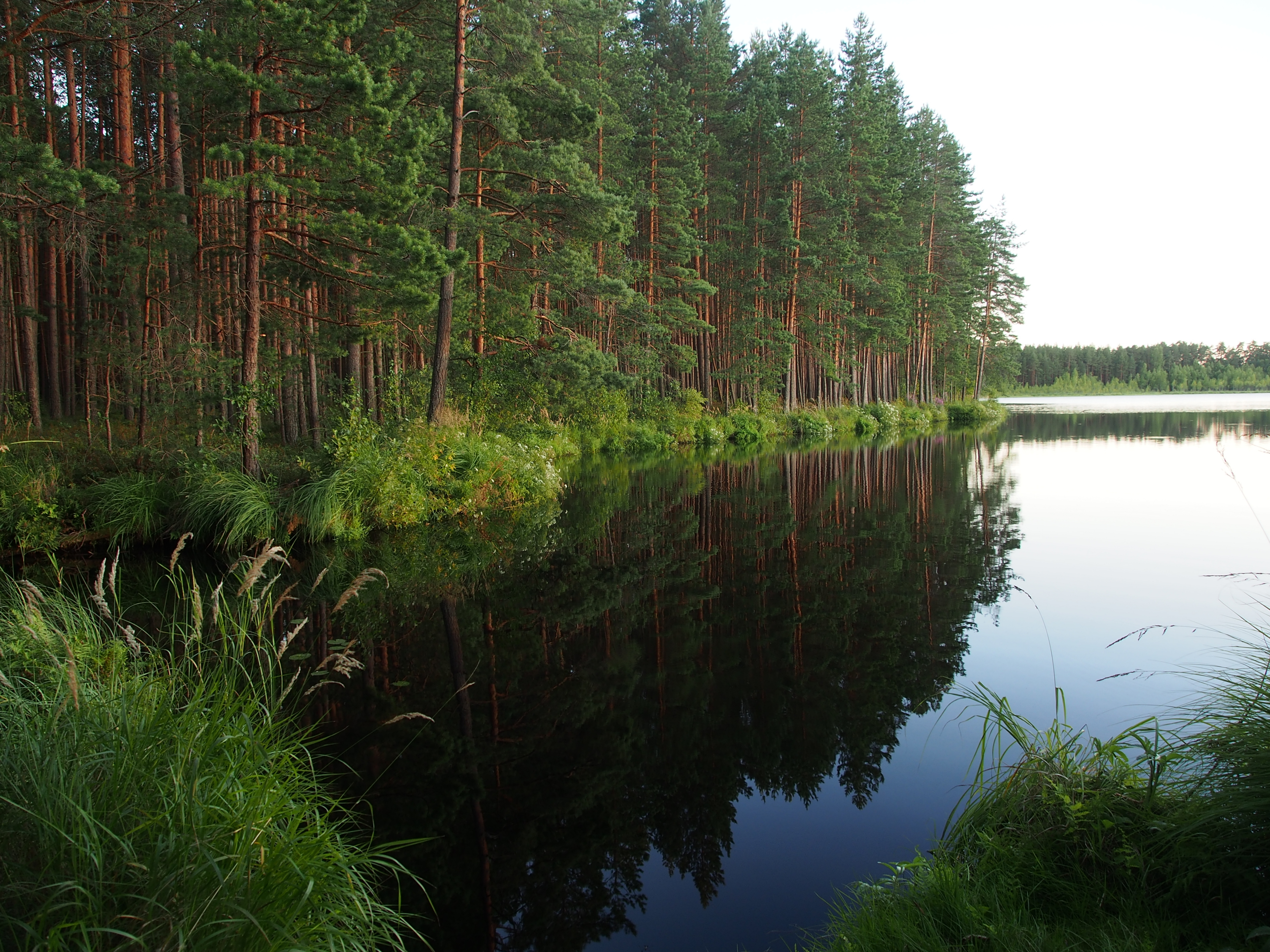
Lake Mustjärv

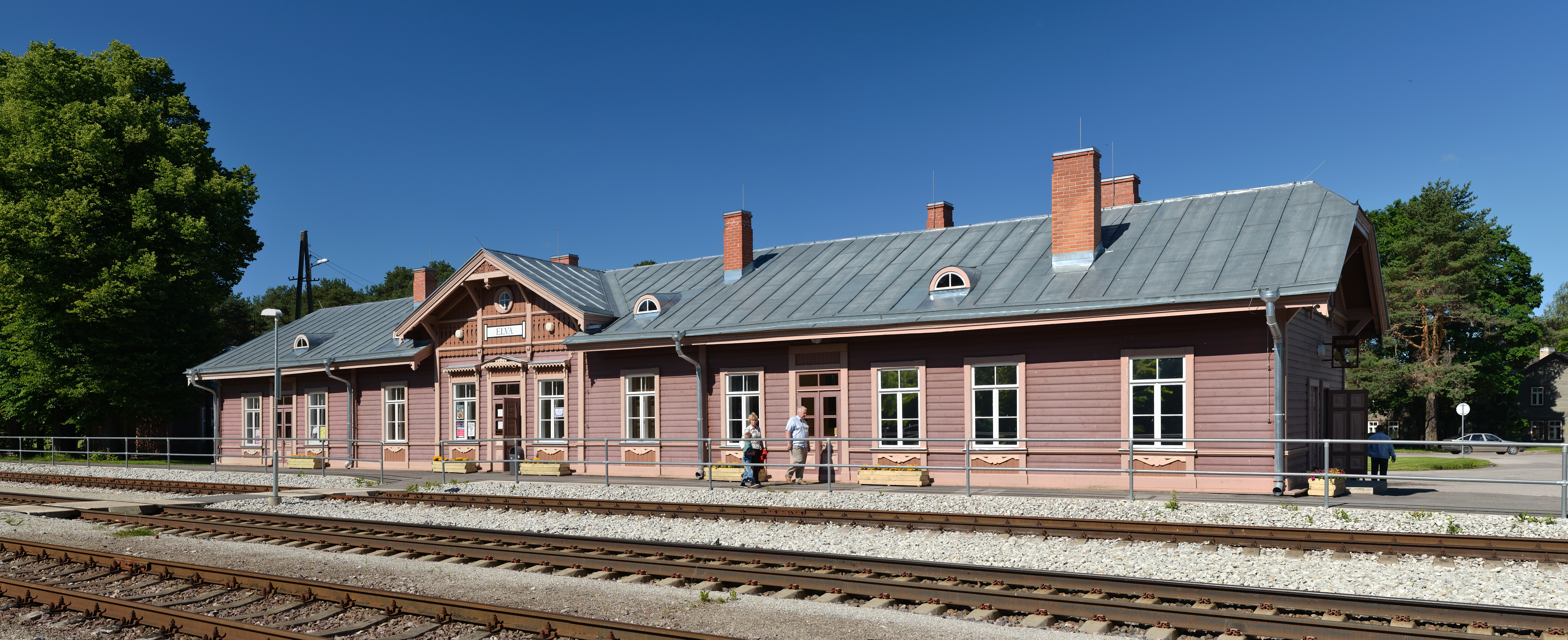
Elva train station

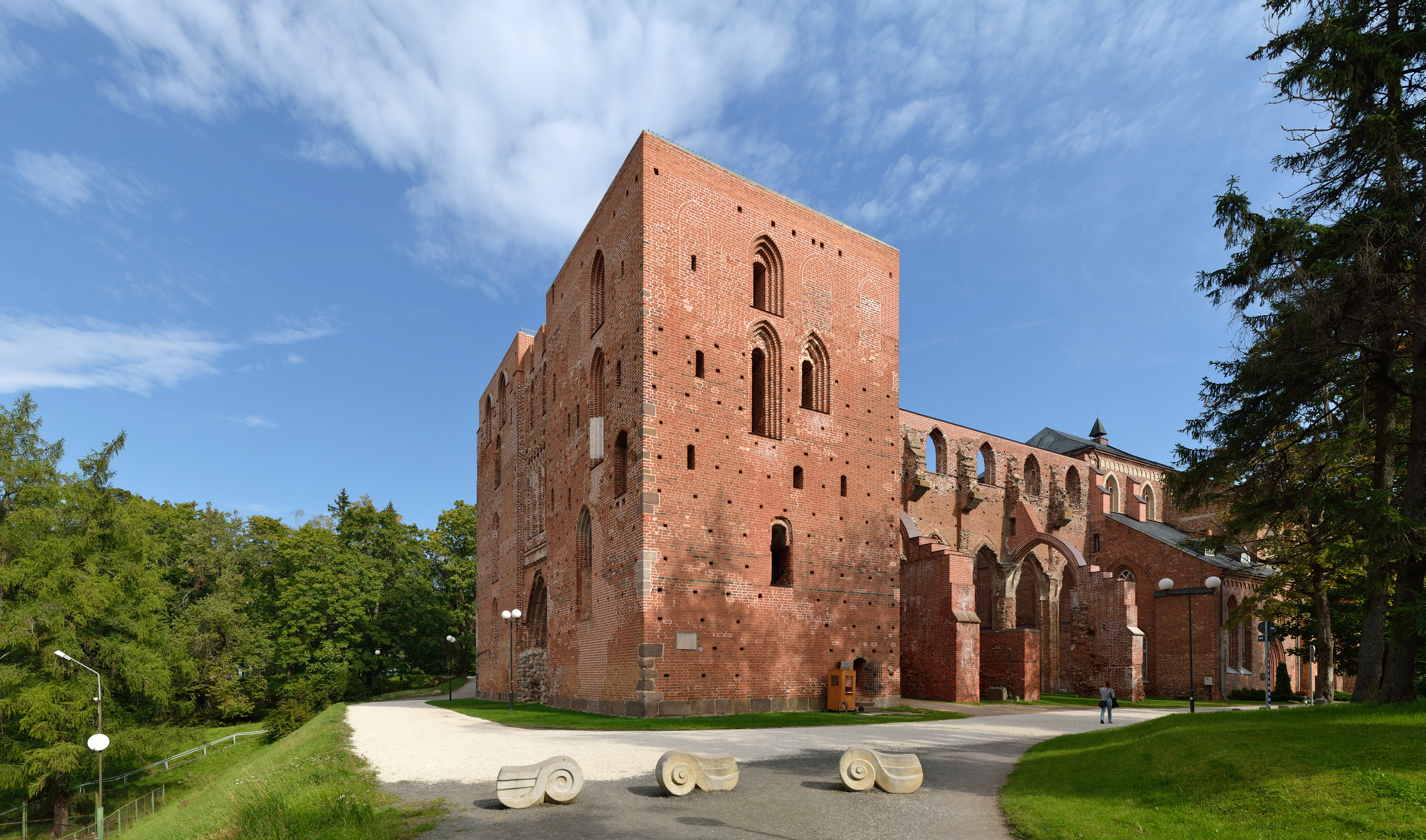
Tartu Cathedral ruins
