= Union of Cities THE HANSA =

Dutch organization founded in 1980

- Founded at: Zwolle in 1980
- Headquarters: Lübeck
- Members: c. 200 cities and municipalities
- Official language: English and German
- President: Jan Lindenau
- Website: www.hanse.org/en

The Union of Cities THE HANSA (formerly known as the New Hanseatic League) was founded in the Dutch city of Zwolle in 1980 by representatives of former Hanseatic cities to "revive the common heritage of the Hanseatic era." With almost 200 member cities and municipalities, the Union of Cities THE HANSA is the largest voluntary association of cities in the world. The aim of the multilateral municipal partnership is to continue the cross-border tradition of the Hanseatic League as a contribution to European integration, joint tourism marketing and generally increased cooperation between the member cities.

== History ==
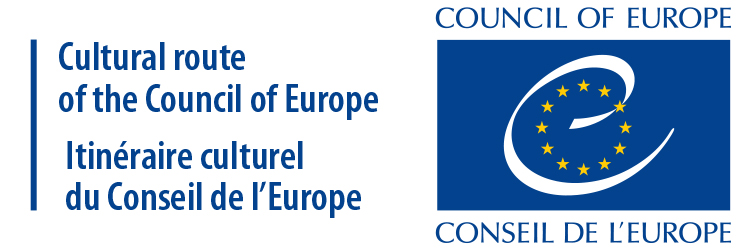
Since 1991 THE HANSA is certified as a Cultural Route of the Council of Europe.

The Union of Cities THE HANSA tries to continue the tradition of cross-border cooperation of the medieval Hanseatic League. The union of Cities was founded in 1980 in the Dutch Hanseatic city of Zwolle. On the city's 750th anniversary, it invited representatives from 43 former Hanseatic cities to a Hanseatic Day, after which the Union of Cities THE HANSA was founded and the annual organization of a Hanseatic Day was agreed. The aim of the delegates was “to promote the cultural heritage and Hanseatic identity in the member cities and to work together for a united and peaceful Europe”. Over the course of its existence, the network of almost 200 cities and municipalities (as of 14 May 2024) has constantly deepened and expanded. The number of members increased rapidly, particularly due to the accession of the former Hanseatic cities of Central and Eastern Europe following the collapse of the Eastern Bloc. In 1992, the 12th International Hanseatic Day was held for the first time east of the former Iron Curtain in Tallinn, Estonia. In the 1990s, the Union of Cities financed the restoration of St. Nicholas Cathedral in Veliky Novgorod, Russia, as part of a solidarity campaign by the Hanseatic cities. The names of the participating cities are commemorated at the main entrance to the church. The Council of Europe certified THE HANSA as Cultural Route in 1991. This makes THE HANSA the second oldest Cultural Route of the Council of Europe after the Way of St. James to Santiago de Compostela.

Due to the Russian war of aggression against Ukraine, the 2022 Assembly of Delegates of the Union of Cities unanimously decided to exclude the Russian and Belarusian member cities from its activities for an indefinite period. In a statement, the Union of Cities reaffirmed that “communication with our Hanseatic cities in Russia and Belarus must not be completely broken off. The cities remain members of the Hanseatic League.”

== Organization ==
=== Union of Cities ===
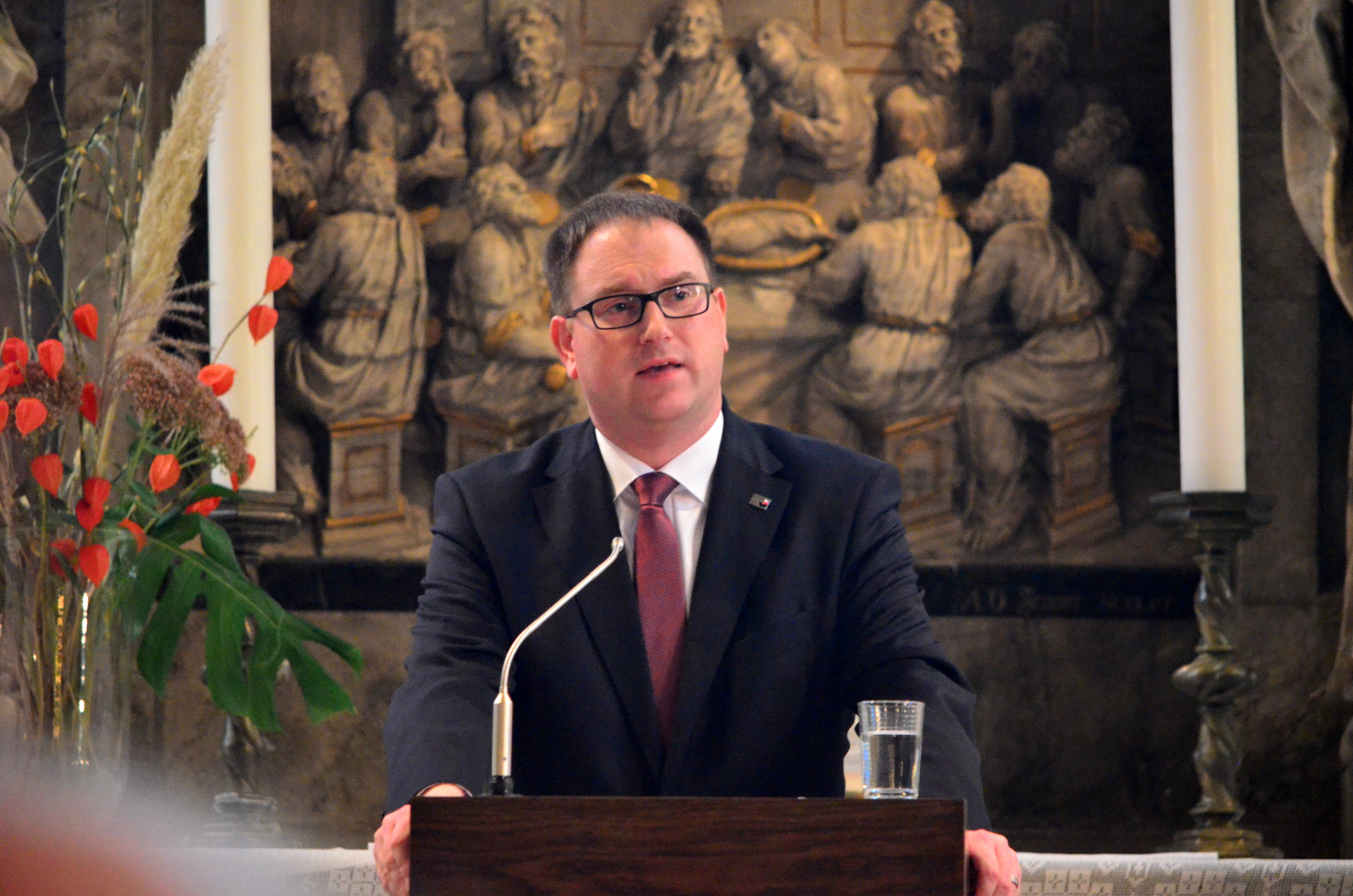
Jan Lindenau, President of the Hansa, in Brunswyk, 2019

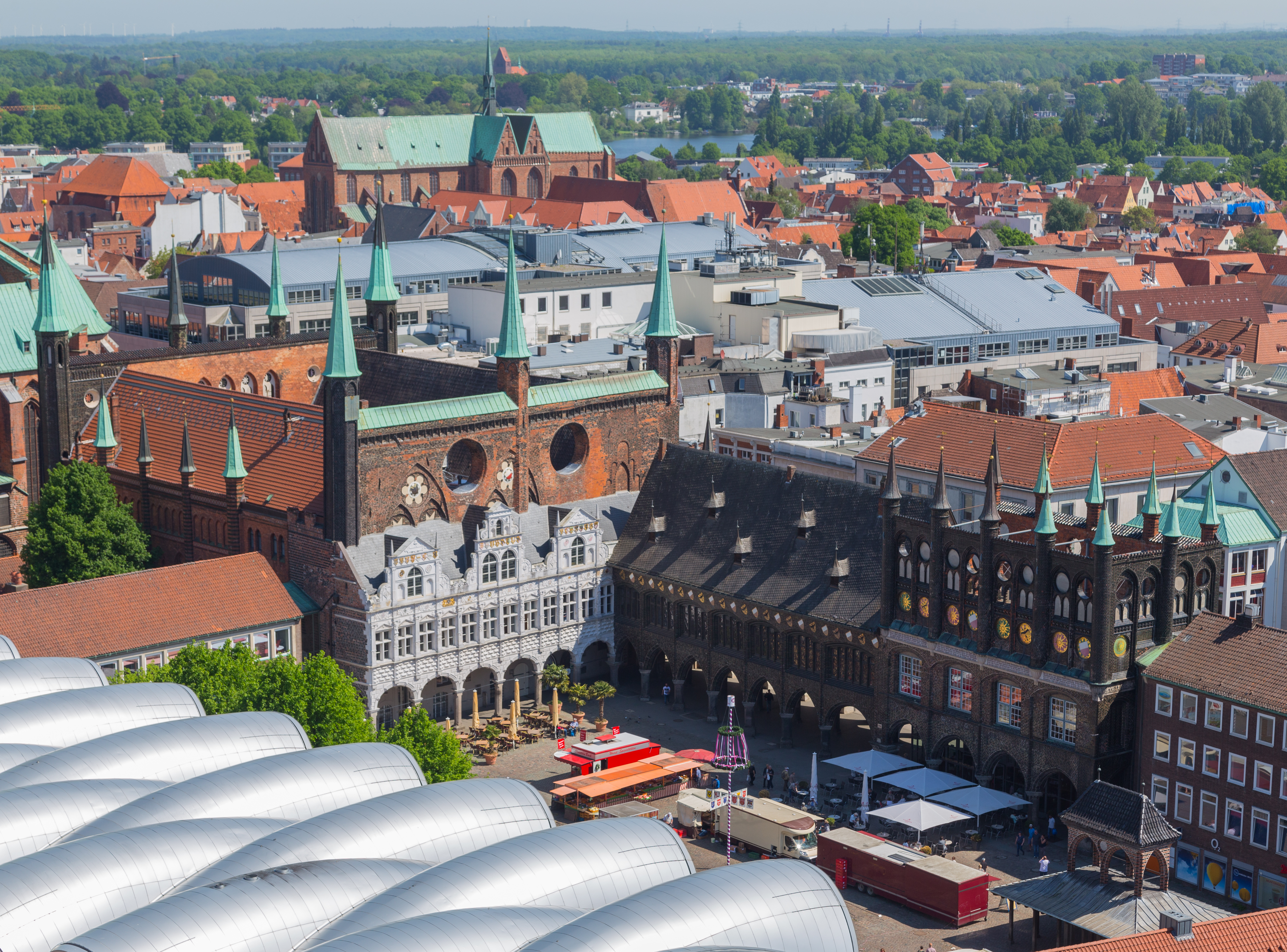
The Hanseatic Office is located in Lübeck Town Hall.

The Union of Cities THE HANSA accepts applications from cities and towns that were members of the historic Hanseatic League or that were home to Hanseatic trading posts or so-called Kontors. The supreme body is the Assembly of Delegates in which each city or town has one vote. The Assembly of Delegates has a quorum regardless of the number of cities represented and decides by a majority of those present. The Assembly of Delegates decides on amendments to the Articles of Association, the admission and exclusion of members, the election of the Board and the approval of projects. The Board consists of the President and four representatives, who should come from at least three countries. According to the statutes, the president, who bears the title of Vormann in German, is the mayor of the Hanseatic city of Lübeck, Jan Lindenau (SPD) since 2018. The representatives are elected by the Assembly of Delegates; currently (as of 13 May 2024) these are Inger Harlevi, the President of the Provincial Council of the island of Gotland (for the city of Visby), Christof Bartsch, the Mayor of Brilon, Jānis Rozenbergs, Mayor of the city of Cēsis and Peter Snijders, Mayor of the city of Zwolle. The Commission comprises the representatives of five German cities and one city from each country in which there are active members of THE HANSA (currently Belgium, Estonia, Finland, France, Iceland, Latvia, Lithuania, the Netherlands, Norway, Poland, Sweden and the United Kingdom). Due to the Russian invasion of Ukraine, the representatives of Russia and Belarus have been excluded from participating in Commission meetings. The Commission prepares the Hanseatic Days and proposes candidates for the Board. The working languages of THE HANSA are German and English.

The Hanseatic Office is responsible for overall management and is based in Lübeck Town Hall.

=== Youth Hansa ===
The Youth Hansa is the youth organization of THE HANSA. It was founded in 1998 with the aim to “make young people aware of the Hanseatic heritage and to enable international and intercultural exchange between them”. According to its bylaws, young people between the ages of 15 and 26 are free to participate in the Youth Hansa. Communication within the Youth Hansa takes place in English. The Youth Hansa sends delegates to every International Hanseatic Day in consultation with the respective member cities. As an independent body of THE HANSA, the Youth Hansa has its own bylaws. In addition, the Youth Hansa organizes its own smaller meetings in the Hanseatic cities and develops projects on the topic of international cooperation. The organization of Youth Hansa is based on that of the Union of Cities THE HANSA. It also has an Assembly of Delegates from the Hanseatic cities, which meets once a year at the International Hanseatic Day. The application process to become a delegate of a member city at the Hanseatic Day is not uniformly regulated and differs from city to city. According to the bylaws, the Assembly of Delegates passes resolutions with a simple majority, whereas the Youth Hansa statutes can only be amended with a two-thirds majority. The Youth Hansa also has its own commission. This consists of five people and serves to coordinate the Youth Hansa and represent it outside the International Hanseatic Day. The commission elects a speaker to represent the Youth Hansa at official meetings of THE HANSA, who is currently Rachid Hamdaoui from Neuss (as of 14 May 2024). The current commission was elected at the 2022 International Hanseatic Day in Neuss and will remain in office until the 2024 International Hanseatic Day in Gdańsk.

=== Cultural Route of the Council of Europe ===
Since 1987, the Council of Europe is certifying real or virtual connections between places in Europe as Cultural Routes in order to connect people and places in networks of shared history and heritage. This serves the purpose of promoting intercultural dialogue within Europe as well as fostering transnational tourism. THE HANSA has been designated as such a Cultural Route since 1991. Legally the HanseVerein e.V. is running and representing THE HANSA Cultural Route, as the Union of Cities itself has no legal capacity.

== Activities ==
=== International Hanseatic Day ===
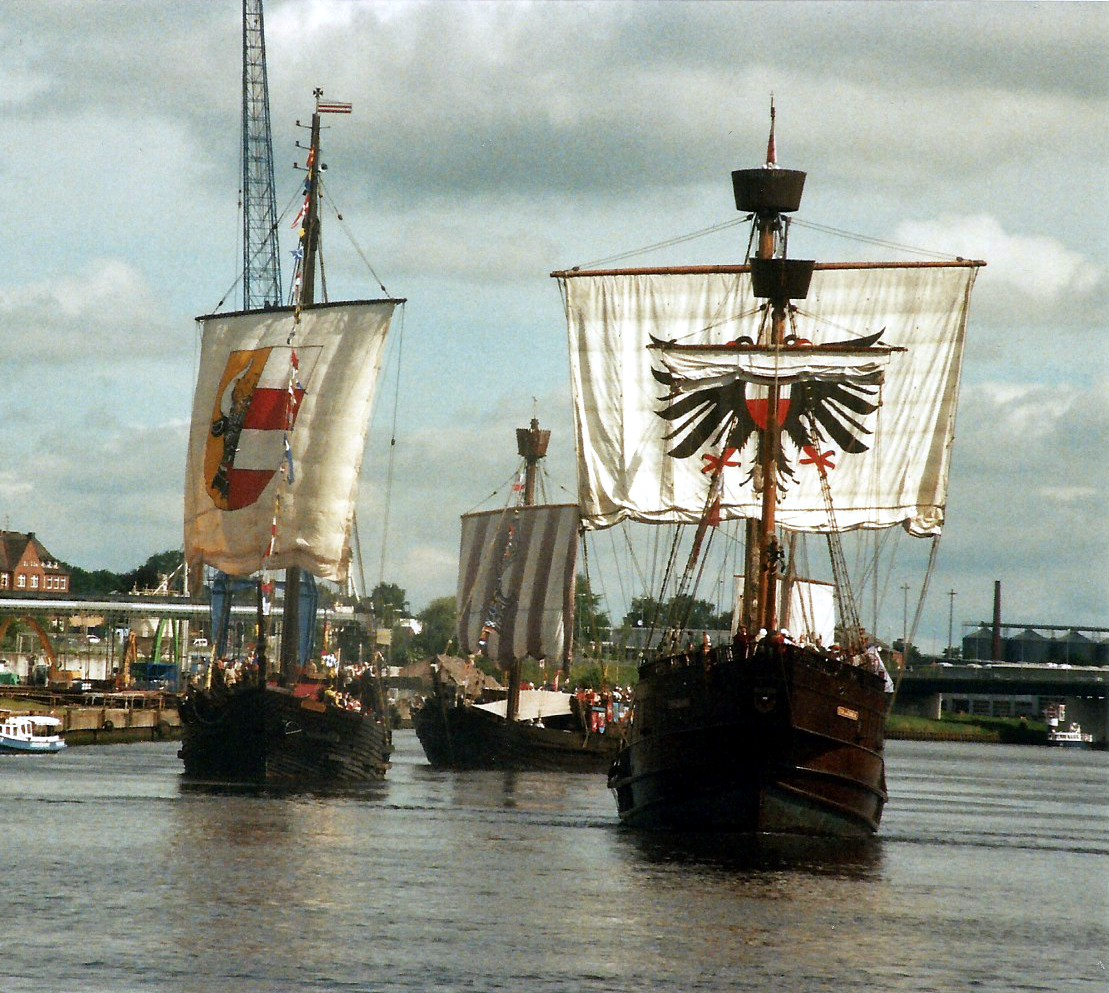
34th International Hanseatic Day in Lübeck, Germany, 2014

Similar to the Hanseatic Diets (Hansetage) of the medieval Hanseatic League, THE HANSA organizes an International Hanseatic Day every year as a major event with up to 500,000 visitors. Each year the Hanseatic Day takes place in a different Hanseatic city and is organized by the respective host with the support of the Hanseatic Office in Lübeck. The International Hanseatic Day includes a broad program consisting of numerous activities, markets and exhibitions that vary from year to year. Many Hanseatic cities are represented with their own stand at the so-called Hanseatic Fair, where local food and products as well as travel offers are promoted. Music, dance and music groups from the Hanseatic cities also perform. Due to the COVID-19 pandemic, the 2021 Hanseatic Days in Riga and 2020 in Brilon had to take place mainly online. Unlike on the Day of the Hansa (see below), the institutions of the Union of Cities meet at the International Hanseatic Day and pass joint resolutions.

=== Day of the Hansa ===
Every year, THE HANSA celebrates the Day of the Hansa on the third weekend in May. To mark the occasion, a wide range of Hanseatic-themed activities takes place in the member cities. These include historical city tours, exhibitions, musical events and craft workshops. The respective cities design their own programme, whereby not all member cities of the Union of Cities offer their own events on the Day of the Hansa. In contrast to the International Hanseatic Day, the Day of the Hansa takes place in the respective cities. The institutions of the Union of Cities also do not meet here and no decisions are made concerning the entire Union.

== Membership (As of 13th May 2024) ==
Belarus

- Polotsk - currently suspended from all activities
- Vitebsk - currently suspended from all activities

Belgium

- Bruges

Germany

- Ahlen
- Alfeld (Leine)
- Anklam
- Attendorn
- Bad Iburg
- Balve
- Beckum
- Bockenem
- Brakel
- Brandenburg an der Havel
- Braunschweig
- Breckerfeld
- Bremen
- Brilon
- Buxtehude
- Demmin
- Dinslaken
- Dorsten
- Dortmund
- Duderstadt
- Duisburg
- Einbeck
- Emmerich am Rhein
- Frankfurt (Oder)
- Fürstenau
- Gardelegen
- Goslar
- Greifswald
- Gronau (Leine)
- Halle (Saale)
- Haltern am See
- Hamburg
- Hamm
- Hannover
- Haselünne
- Hattingen
- Havelberg
- Helmstedt
- Herford
- Hildesheim
- Höxter
- Kalkar-Grieth
- Kamen
- Kiel
- Köln
- Korbach
- Kyritz
- Lemgo
- Lippstadt
- Lübeck
- Lüneburg
- Lünen
- Magdeburg
- Marienmünster
- Marsberg
- Medebach
- Meppen
- Merseburg
- Minden
- Mühlhausen (Thuringia)
- Münster
- Naumburg (Saale)
- Neuenrade
- Neuss
- Nieheim
- Osnabrück
- Osterburg (Altmark)
- Osterode am Harz
- Paderborn
- Perleberg
- Pritzwalk
- Quakenbrück
- Quedlinburg
- Rheda-Wiedenbrück
- Rostock
- Rüthen
- Salzwedel
- Schwerte
- Seehausen (Altmark)
- Soest
- Stade
- Stendal
- Stralsund
- Sundern (Sauerland)
- Tangermünde
- Telgte
- Uelzen
- Unna
- Uslar
- Warburg
- Warendorf
- Werben (Elbe)
- Werl
- Werne
- Wesel
- Wipperfürth
- Wismar

Estonia

- Narva
- Pärnu
- Tallinn
- Tartu
- Viljandi

Finland

- Turku/Åbo
- Ulvila/Ulvsby

France

- La Rochelle

Iceland

- Hafnarfjörður
- Stykkishólmur

Latvia

- Cēsis
- Koknese
- Kuldīga
- Limbaži
- Riga – status unclear
- Straupe
- Valmiera
- Ventspils

Lithuania

- Kaunas

Netherlands

- Bolsward
- Deventer
- Doesburg
- Elburg
- Groningen
- Harderwijk
- Hasselt
- Hattem
- Kampen
- Maasbommel
- Oldenzaal
- Ommen
- Rijssen
- Roermond
- Stavoren
- Tiel
- Venlo
- Zaltbommel
- Zutphen
- Zwolle

Norway

- Bergen

Poland

- Białogard
- Braniewo
- Chełmno
- Darłowo
- Elbląg
- Frombork
- Gdańsk
- Goleniów
- Kołobrzeg
- Koszalin
- Kraków
- Kwidzyn
- Lębork
- Malbork
- Olsztyn
- Sławno
- Słubice
- Słupsk
- Stargard
- Strzelce Opolskie
- Toruń
- Wrocław

Russia

- Belozersk – currently suspended from all activities
- Ivangorod – currently suspended from all activities
- Kaliningrad – currently suspended from all activities
- Kingissepp – currently suspended from all activities
- Porkhov – currently suspended from all activities
- Pskov – currently suspended from all activities
- Smolensk – currently suspended from all activities
- Staraya Russa – currently suspended from all activities
- Torzhok – currently suspended from all activities
- Totma – currently suspended from all activities
- Tver – currently suspended from all activities
- Veliky Novgorod – currently suspended from all activities
- Veliky Ustyug – currently suspended from all activities
- Vologda – currently suspended from all activities
- Vyborg – currently suspended from all activities
- Vyshny Volochok – currently suspended from all activities

Sweden

- Kalmar
- Nyköping
- Skanör-Falsterbo
- Visby

United Kingdom

- Aberdeen
- Beverley
- Boston
- Edinburgh
- Great Yarmouth
- Ipswich
- King's Lynn
- Kingston upon Hull
