= Hanseatic Days of New Time =

International Festival held by member cities of the New Hansa

The Hanseatic Days of New Time or the Hansa Days of New Time (German: Hansetage der Neuzeit) is an annual international festival of member cities of the Hanseatic League of New Time (also known as the New Hansa).

The Hanseatic Days are held annually in one of the member cities of the New Hansa since 1980, when it was decided to re-establish the Hanseatic League and the first Hanseatic Days were held in Zwolle, the Netherlands. During the festival, Hanseatic cities from different European countries try to position themselves as cities that have rich historic traditions but that continue their successful development in our days as well. Apart from the festival, Hanseatic Days include an international forum where representatives of member cities of the New Hansa discuss their political, economic and cultural cooperation.

== Venues ==
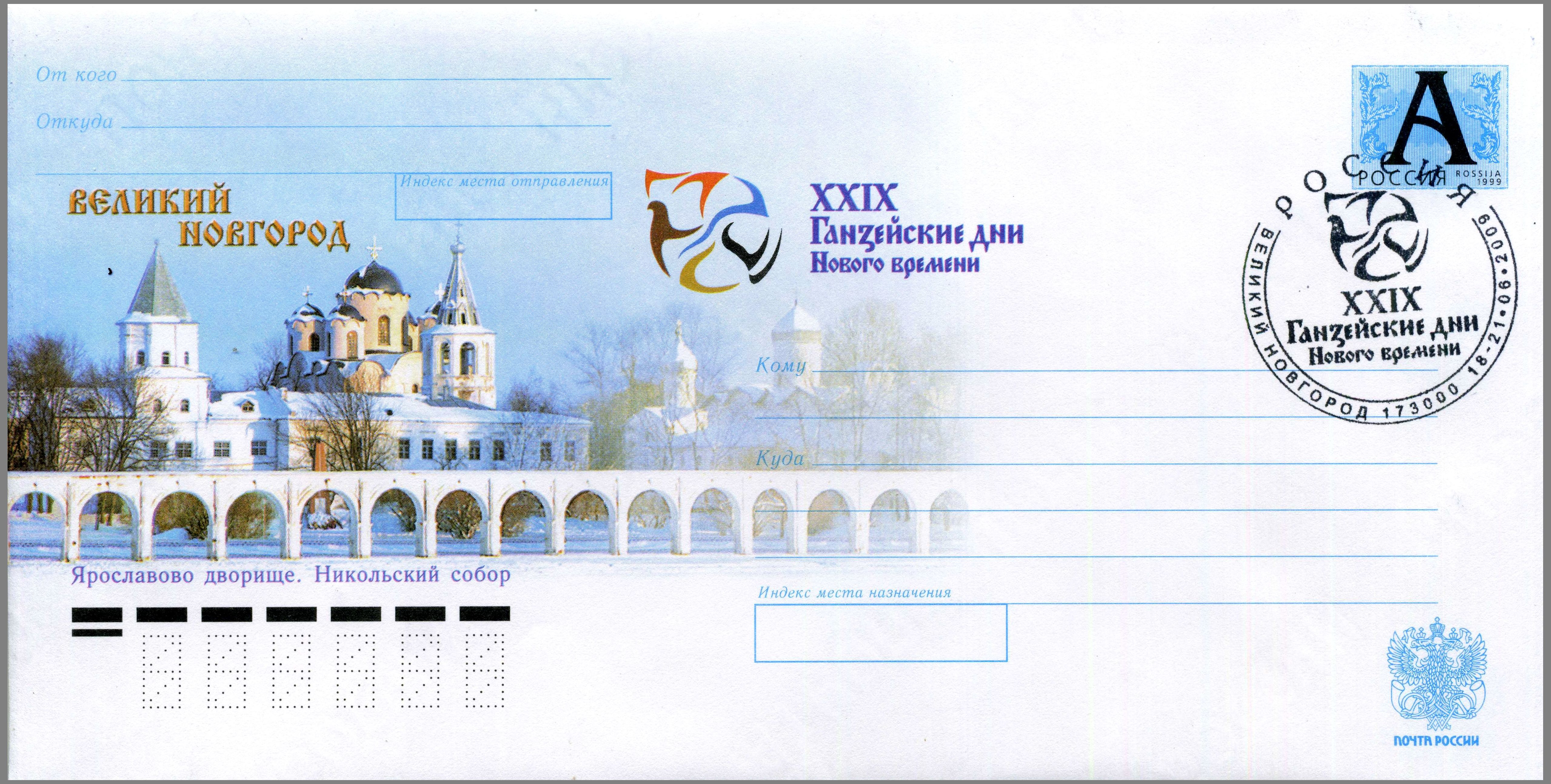
Illustrated PSE with special cancellation issued to mark 29th Hanseatic Days in Novgorod, Russia, 2009

- 1980 – Zwolle, Netherlands
- 1982 – Dortmund, Germany
- 1983 – Lübeck, Germany
- 1984 – Neuss, Germany
- 1985 – Braunschweig, Germany
- 1986 – Duisburg, Germany
- 1987 – Kalmar, Sweden
- 1988 – Cologne, Germany
- 1989 – Hamburg, Germany
- 1990 – Deventer and Zutphen, Netherlands
- 1991 – Wesel, Germany
- 1992 – Tallinn, Estonia
- 1993 – Münster, Germany
- 1994 – Stade, Germany
- 1995 – Soest, Germany
- 1996 – Bergen, Norway
- 1997 – Gdańsk, Poland
- 1998 – Visby, Sweden
- 1999 – Oldenzaal, Netherlands
- 2000 – Zwolle, Netherlands
- 2001 – Riga, Latvia
- 2002 – Bruges, Belgium
- 2003 – Frankfurt (Oder), Germany and Słubice, Poland
- 2004 – Turku, Finland
- 2005 – Tartu, Estonia
- 2006 – Osnabrück, Germany
- 2007 – Lippstadt, Germany
- 2008 – Salzwedel, Germany
- 2009 – Novgorod, Russia
- 2010 – Pärnu, Estonia
- 2011 – Kaunas, Lithuania
- 2012 – Lüneburg, Germany
- 2013 – Herford, Germany
- 2014 – Lübeck, Germany
- 2015 – Viljandi, Estonia
- 2016 – Bergen, Norway
- 2017 – Kampen, Netherlands
- 2018 – Rostock, Germany
- 2019 – Pskov, Russia
- 2020 – Brilon, Germany
- 2021 – Riga, Latvia
- 2022 – Neuss, Germany
- 2023 – Toruń, Poland
- 2024 – Gdańsk, Poland
- 2025 – Visby, Sweden
- 2026 – Stargard, Poland
- 2027 – Braunschweig, Germany
- 2028 – Stralsund, Germany
- 2029 – Wismar, Germany
- 2030 – Zwolle, Netherlands

== See also ==
- Tartu Hanseatic Days
