= Pähklisaar Nature Reserve =

Protected area in Estonia

- Location within Estonia
- Location: Estonia
- Coordinates: 58°26′N 27°00′E
- Area: 770 ha (1,900 acres)
- Established: 1964 (2016)

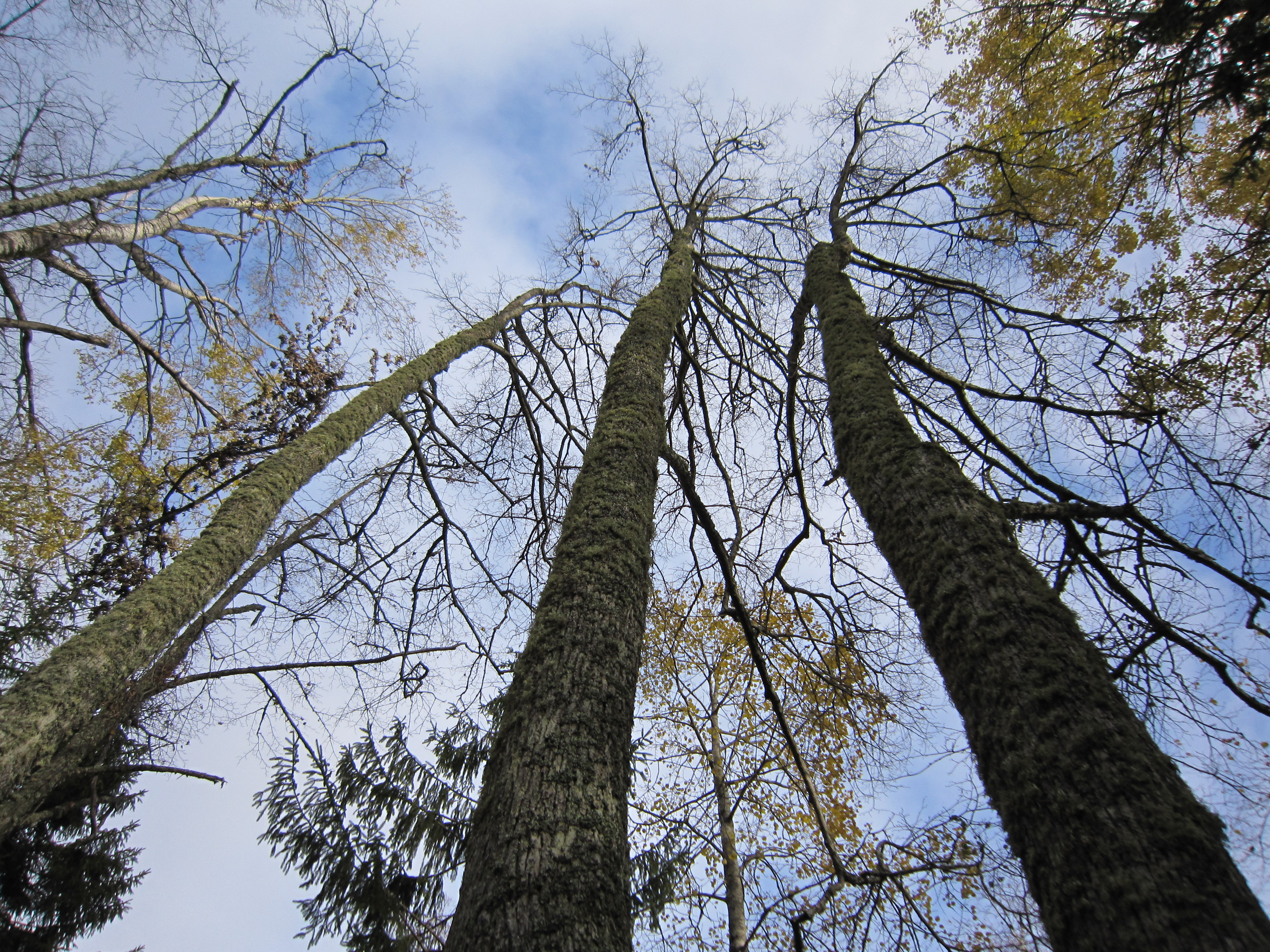

Pähklisaar Nature Reserve is a nature reserve which is located in Tartu County, Estonia.

The area of the nature reserve is 770 ha.

The protected area was founded in 1964 to protect Pähklisaar (:et) and its surrounding areas. Before 1999, the protected area was designated as a Pähklisaar Landscape Conservation Area. In 1999 the nature reserve was formed.
