= Tartu Hanseatic Days =

Series of festivals held in Tartu, Estonia

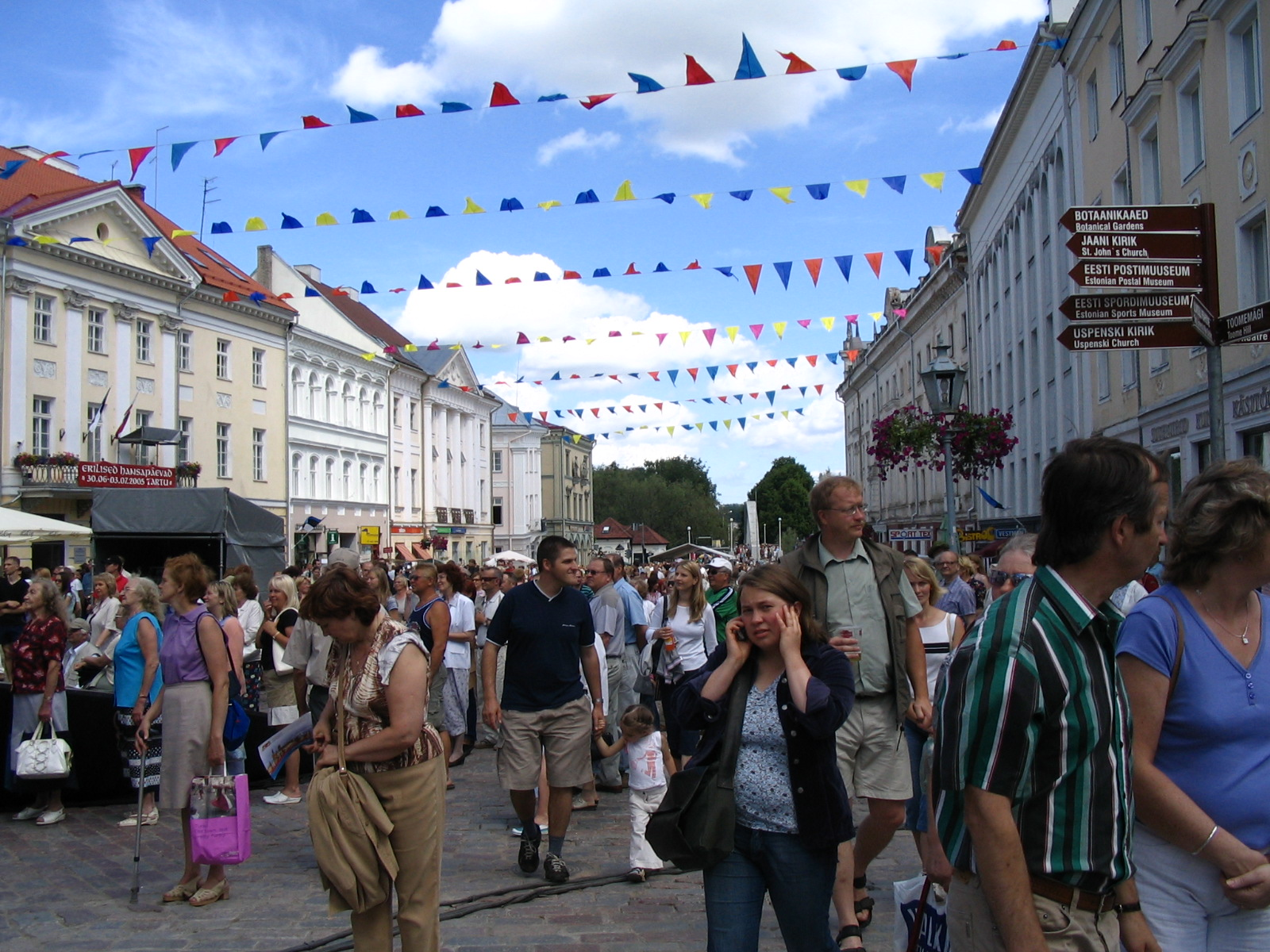
Tartu Hanseatic Days in 2005

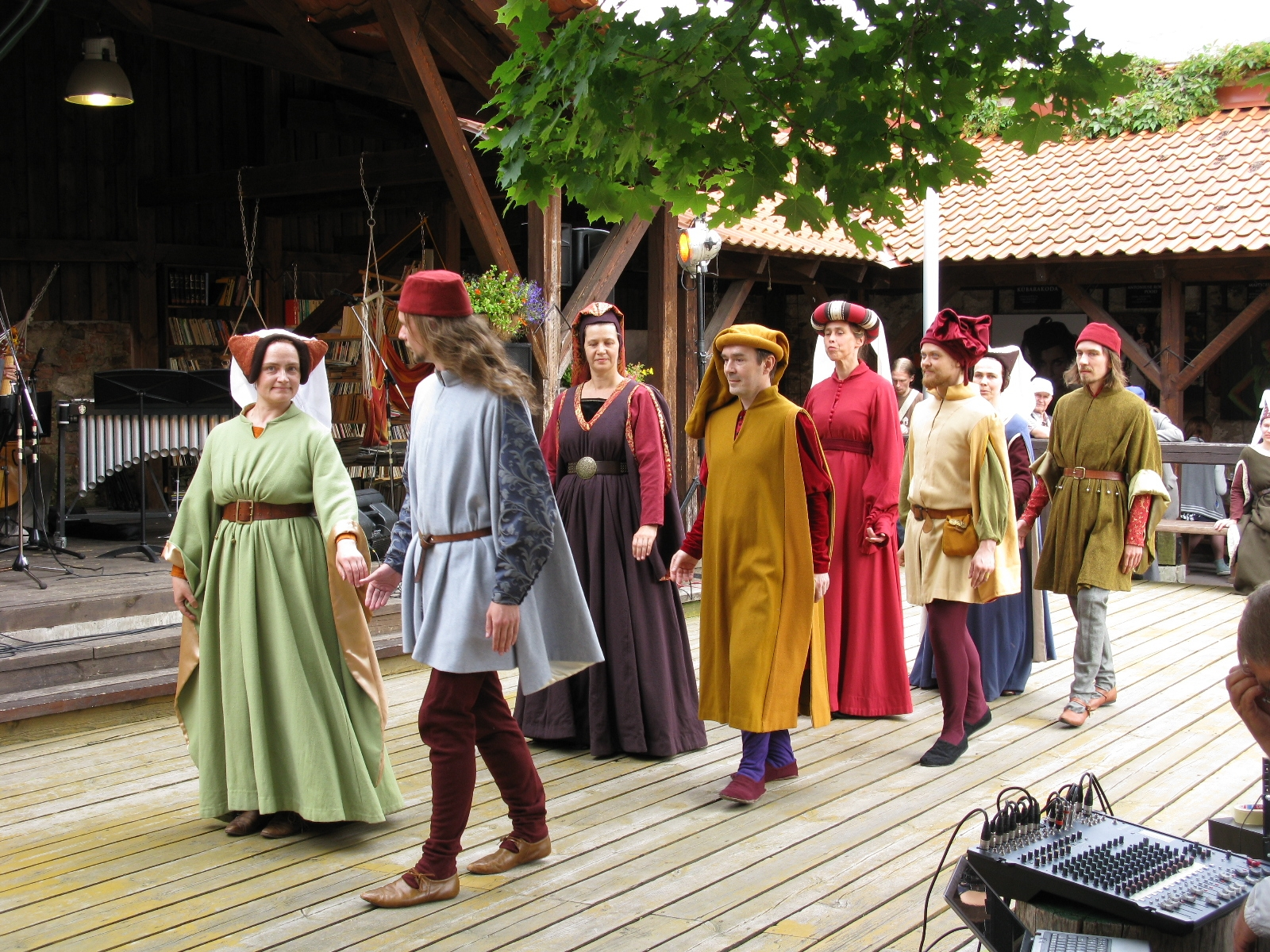
Early dance ensemble Saltatriculi at Tartu Hanseatic Days in 2012

Tartu Hanseatic Days (Estonian: Tartu Hansapäevad) is an annual festival held in Tartu, Estonia. The name of the festival refers to the fact that Tartu was a member of medieval Hanseatic League.

First festival took place in 1995. The festival is organized by Tartu City and Tartu City Museum. One of the main event of the festival is Hansalaat ('Hanseatic Market').

In 2007, the festival has about 70,000 visitors.

== See also ==
- Hanseatic Days of New Time
