= Tartu Science Park =

Science park in Tartu, Estonia

Tartu Science Park (Estonian: Tartu Teaduspark) is a science park in Tartu, Estonia. The science park was founded in 1992, being the first science park in Baltics.

The science park is a home for over 80 companies, including electronics and apparatus building companies, biomedicine companies, and information and communication technologies. The science park has also been a home for several start-up companies which later has grown big, e.g. Click & Grow.
