= Herta =

Herta may refer to the following:

== Given name ==
- Herta Anitaș (born 1967) Romanian rower and Olympic medalist
- Hertha Ayrton (1854–1923), British engineer, mathematician, physicist and inventor
- Herta Bothe (1921–2000), German guard at Nazi concentration camps
- Herta Däubler-Gmelin (born 1943), German politician, German Minister of Justice
- Herta Ehlert (1905–1997), German guard at many Nazi concentration camps
- Herta Elviste (1923–2016), Estonian actress
- Herta Feely (born ????), German-American editor, and child safety activist
- Herta Freitag (1908–2000), Austrian-born American mathematician and professor
- Herta Groves (1920– 2016), British hat designer
- Herta Haas (1914–2010), Yugoslav Partisan during World War II and second wife of Josip Broz Tito
- Herta Hafner, Italian luger
- Herta Herzog (1910–2010), Austrian-born American social scientist specializing in communication studies
- Herta Heuwer (1913–1999), German inventor of the take-out dish currywurst
- Herta Huber (1926–2018), German writer and poet
- Herta Laipaik (1921–2008), Estonian writer
- Herta Müller (born 1953), Romanian-born German novelist, poet, essayist and recipient of the 2009 Nobel Prize in Literature
- Herta Oberheuser (1911–1978), German physician at the Ravensbrück concentration camp
- Herta Ratzenhofer (1921–2010), Austrian pair skater and Olympic competitor
- Herta Ware (1917–2005), American actress and political activist
- Herta Wescher (1899–1971), German art historian and art critic
- Herta Wunder (1913–1992), German freestyle swimmer and Olympic competitor

== Surname ==
- Bryan Herta (born 1970), American race car driver
- Colton Herta (born 2000), American race car driver, son of Bryan Herta
- Teodor Herța, Bessarabian politician
- Vladimir Herța, Moldovan politician and mayor of Chișinău

== Locations ==
- Herța River, a tributary of the Prut River, Romania
- Hertsa (Romanian: Herța), a city in Chernivtsi Oblast, Ukraine
- The Hertsa region, a former Romanian region, now in Ukraine

== Other uses ==
- Herta Foods, brand of pre-cooked Frankfurters, previously owned by Nestlé and now by Casa Tarradellas
- "Herta", a type of drum rudiment
- Herta (Honkai: Star Rail), a playable character in Honkai: Star Rail

== See also ==
- Hertha (disambiguation)
- Herța (disambiguation)
