= Hertha =

Hertha may refer to:

== Sports clubs ==
- Hertha BSC, a German football club
- Hertha Zehlendorf, a German football club
- CFC Hertha 06, a German sports club
- Hertha Wels, an Austrian football club
- ASV Hertha Wien, a defunct Austrian German football club
- FC Hertha Wiesbach, a German football club

== Other uses ==
- Hertha (given name), a list of women with the name
- A misreading of the name of the goddess Nerthus, a Germanic goddess
- 135 Hertha, an asteroid
- Hertha Nunatak, a nunatak in Antarctica
- SMS Hertha, two warships of the German Imperial Navy
- Hertha (novel), a Swedish novel by Fredrika Bremer, first published in 1856
- Hertha (magazine), a Swedish women's magazine

== See also ==
- Herta (disambiguation)
- Herthasee (disambiguation)
