= Herta Laipaik =

Estonian writer

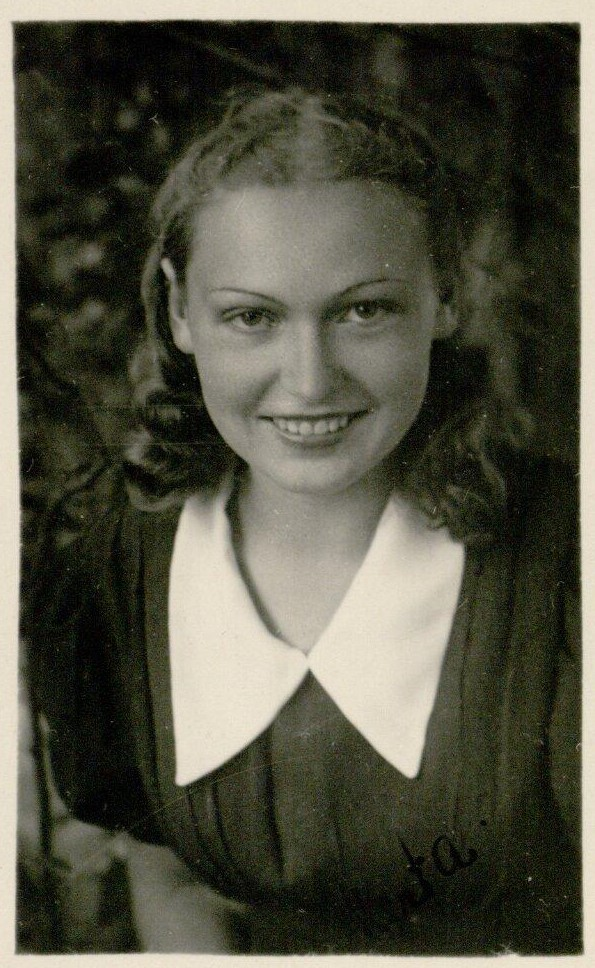

Herta Leilla Laipaik (29 January 1921 – 17 January 2008) was an Estonian writer.

== Early life and career ==
Herta Leilia Laipaik (from 1943 Herta L. Rumma, from 1955 Herta L. Kornev) was born on 29 January 1921 in Valga County, Southern Estonia. She went to school at Tõrva Elementary and High Schools (1928–1940) and later continued her education at the University of Tartu, Faculty of Medicine (1940–1943).

As the Russian and German armies took turns invading Estonia during WWII, it became clear that Herta could not graduate from college. Although she did not earn a medical degree, the training that she had received allowed her to work as a nurse and support her family; her father had been killed by the Russian army.

In the 1940s Herta Laipaik started her literary career, writing articles and short stories for several large Estonian newspapers ("Postimees," "Eesti Sõna," "Õhtuleht").

In September 1944, Dr. Endel Rumma, Herta's first husband, fled from Estonia to Sweden to escape the Russian occupation. Herta, who was pregnant at that time, didn't want to risk that dangerous journey and stayed in Estonia. That ended their unhappy marriage. In March 1945, their daughter Katrin was born.

In 1949 Herta's partner and future husband Dr. Nikolai Kornev was deported to Siberia, Krasnoyarsk Krai. Herta voluntarily followed him to Siberia with her daughter Katrin a year later. From 1950 to 1953 she worked at a hospital in Razdolnoye village, Russia.

After Stalin's death in 1953, the Soviets allowed the deported prisoners to return to their homelands, and the family returned to Estonia. They settled in a small town Karksi-Nuia, where Dr. Kornev worked as a family doctor and Herta Laipaik wrote articles and stories for local newspapers, at the same time raising their second daughter Riina, who was born in 1958.

In 1964, the family moved to Tallinn, the capital of Estonia, where Herta Laipaik continued to write short stories, radio plays and children's literature. She worked her day jobs at the National Library of Estonia and later at the Estonian Theatre and Music Museum as a librarian, until she became a professional writer in 1977.

== Work ==
During her long literary career Herta Laipaik wrote books in many different genres: fantasy, including folk horror, detectives, short stories, plays, etc.

From her earlier work, the short stories Maid Kärt (Teenijatüdruk Kärt, 1944), Gloria Dei (1966) and The Slave Rock (Orjakivi, 1966) stand out. But Laipaik won the true affection of readers with her Siberia themed stories. These were written with historical precision, often depicting the life of Estonian deportees in Siberia after World War II, e.g., the novels With Silver Star in the Taiga (Hõbetähega taigas, 1958), By the Angara River. Anno 1950 (Angaraa ääres. Anno 1950, 1992), and the collection of short stories A Solitary Boat on the Yenisey River (Üksik paat Jenisseil, 1966). Descriptions of these dark days show that the author had no illusions about human depravity. However, the common theme of these stories is a belief in human goodness, inner freedom and search for understanding each other.

In 1977 Herta Laipaik published a collection of detective stories Ghost in the Music Room. Dr. Vallak's Riddle (Kummitus muusikatoas. Doktor Vallaku mõistatus). This book is considered to belong to the classics of Estonian detective stories, and the author was sometimes referred to as the Estonian Agatha Christie.

Herta Laipaik's most popular books are collections of legend-like stories The Curly Birch (Maarjakask, 1983), Raining Evil (Kurjasadu, 1987) and The Gravedigger's Stories (Hauakaevaja lood, 1991) written in an ethno-horror genre, where the author used snippets of the folk heritage from South Estonia. The characters of these stories are ghost-like creatures from the dark side, people of mystical origin and supernatural powers, ghosts, and witches.

Andrus Org writes: "Estonian horror fiction does encapsulate both the techniques from Anglo-American genre horror (Barker, Vangonen) and the impulses from the local folk tradition (Ansomardi, Jaik, Laipaik, Orlau, Reinaus, Kivirüüt, etc.). However, horror fiction is practically a non-existent genre in the Soviet era because it is considered to be ... ideologically foreign (Laipaik being an exception in the genre of ethno-horror fiction)". The books The Curly Birch and Raining Evil place Laipaik to the top of Estonian ethno-horror genre.

Another author, Estonian fantastic fiction specialist and a creator of several anthologies Raul Sulbi considers Laipaik to be the founder of ethno-horror in Estonia. These stories, written in an old Estonian regional language, depicting ancient Estonian traditions and beliefs, are still captivating the minds and hearts of the readers today.

Years 1980 to 2000 were the most productive in Herta Laipaik's literary career. In addition to the above-mentioned books, she wrote the novels Fear (Pelg, 1993), Dog-Faced Monster (Koerakoonlane, 1993), Pearls Die Slowly (Pärlid surevad pikkamisi, 1993), The Path of a Black Opal (Musta Opaali Rada, 1996), Jester of his Own House (Oma koja narr, 1998) and An Ode to a Sequin Evening Gown (Ood litrilisele õhtukleidile, 1999).

Herta Laipaik's last book was a memoir from World War II, Wind Chimes (Tuulekellad, 2000), for what she was given a prestigious Tammsaare Novel Award.

That book was translated to English (translator Virve Martin) and published in 2006.

In 2001 Herta Laipaik was awarded with the Order of the White Star, V Class, in recognition of her lifework.

== Selected works ==
=== Novels ===
- 1958 - "Hõbetähega taigas" (With Silver Star in the Taiga)
- 1982 - "Professor Lillepooli kroonika" (The Chronicle of Professor Lillepool)
- 1986 - "Hallid Luiged" (Grey Swans)
- 1991 - "Vagajutt vaskraamatust" A Pious Story from a Copper Book
- 1992 - "Angaraa ääres. Anno 1950" (By the Angara River. Anno 1950)
- 1993 - "Pelg" (Fear)
- 1993 - "Koerakoonlane" (Dog-faced Monster)
- 1993 - "Pärlid surevad pikkamisi" (Pearls Die Slowly)
- 1996 - "Musta opaali rada" (The Path of a Black Opal)
- 1998 - "Oma koja narr" (Jester of his Own House)
- 1999 - "Ood litrilisele õhtukleidile" (An Ode to a Sequin Evening Gown)
- 2000 - "Tuulekellad" (Wind Chimes)
- 2006 - "Wind Chimes" (English translation)

=== Collected stories ===
- 1966 - "Üksik paat Jenisseil" (A Solitary Boat on the Yenisey River)
- 1977 - "Kummitus muusikatoas. Doktor Vallaku mõistatus" (Ghost in the Music Room. Dr. Vallak's Riddle)
- 1983 - "Maarjakask" (The Curly Birch)
- 1987, 2006 - "Kurjasadu" (Raining Evil)
- 1990 - "Pipratoosi tondid" (The Peppershaker Ghosts)
- 1991 - "Hauakaevaja lood" (The Gravedigger's Stories)
- 1994 - "Ilutüdruku lilled" (Courtesan's Flowers)

=== Selected publications ===
- 1944 - "Teenijatüdruk Kärt" (Maid Kärt)
- 1966 - "Gloria Dei" (Gloria Dei)
- 1966 - "Orjakivi" (The Slaverock)
- 1968 - "Kalmetimäe tamm" (Kalmetimäe Oak)
- 1968 - "Hiiglane seedripuu ja tilluke vöötorav" (The Giant Cedar and the Tiny Chipmunk)
- 1969 - "Põtrade rohupudel" (Mooses' Medicine Bottle)
- 1983 - "Toonekägu" (Death-Cucoo)
- 1987 - "Lättepiiga" (Spring Maid)
- 1990 - "Kooliraha" (Tuition)
- 1990 - "Nõiavits" (Magic Wand)
- 1995 - "Kiri tütrele, iseendale ... ja jumalale" (A Letter to My Daughter, to Myself ... and to God)
