= Hertsa (disambiguation) =

Hertsa, Hertza or Herța may refer to:

- Hertsa, a town in Ukraine
- Hertsa (river), a river in Romania and Ukraine
- Hertsa Raion, a former administrative unit in Ukraine
- Hertsa region, a geographic region in Ukraine, formerly part of Romania
- Teodor Herța, Moldovan politician
- Vladimir Herța, Moldovan politician and mayor of Chișinău
