= Peeter Süda =

Estonian composer and organist

- Born: 30 January 1883; Viki, Kihelkonna Parish, Estonia
- Died: 3 August 1920 (aged 37); Tallinn, Estonia
- Occupations: Composer, organist, folksong collector
- Years active: 1912–1920

Peeter Süda (30 January [O.S. 18 January] 1883 in Viki, Saare County – 3 August 1920 in Tallinn) was a father of the Estonian organ school, composer and an early collector of Estonian folksongs.

He studied at the Saint Petersburg Conservatory from 1902 to 1912. His organ teachers were Louis Homilius and Jacob Handschin, his composition professors included Anatoly Lyadov, Alexander Glazunov, Jāzeps Vītols and Nicolai Soloviev. After graduation, he worked as an organist and piano teacher in Tallinn.

== Works ==
His works consist mainly of polyphonic organ music, sometimes with folk influences. He also wrote a choral fugue, "The Flax Puller".

- Prelude and Fugue in G minor

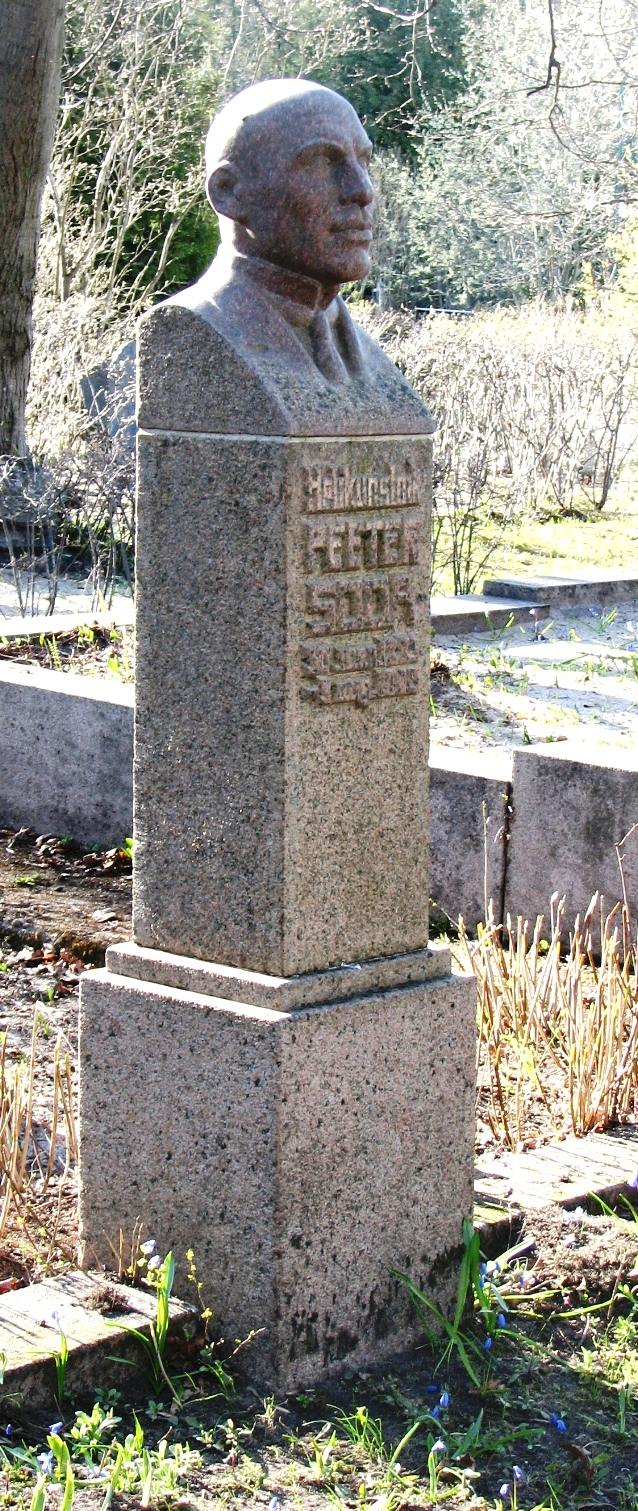
A bust depicting Peeter Süda at the Siselinna cemetery in Tallinn.

== Influence ==
The Peeter Süda Memorial Foundation was established in 1924, eventually becoming the Estonian Theatre and Music Museum was set up. The museum regards the "heart" of Estonian Theatre and Music Museum."

== Recordings ==
- on Baltic organ music BIS
- Complete works. EMIC, 2005
