= Krapkowice =

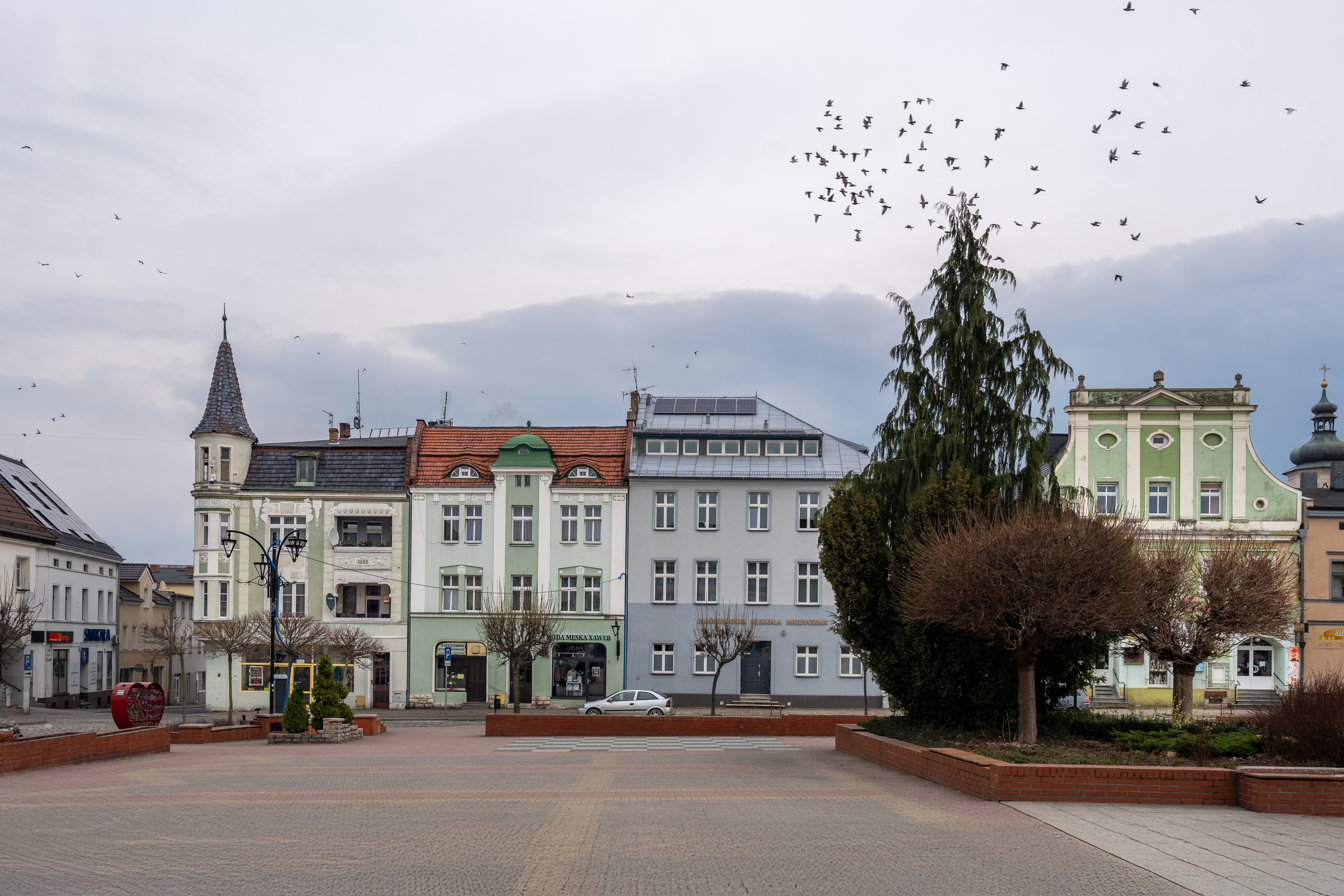
- Krapkowice Market Square

- Flag Coat of arms

- Location within Poland
- Coordinates: 50°28′N 17°58′E
- Country: Poland
- Voivodeship: Opole
- County: Krapkowice
- Gmina: Krapkowice
- Town rights: 1284

Government
  - Mayor: Andrzej Kasiura

Area
  - Total: 20.91 km^{2} (8.07 sq mi)

Population (2019-06-30)
  - Total: 16,301
  - Density: 779.6/km^{2} (2,019/sq mi)
- Time zone: UTC+1 (CET)
  - Summer (DST): UTC+2 (CEST)
- Postal code: 47-300 and 47-303 for Otmęt district
- Car plates: OKR
- Website: https://krapkowice.pl

Krapkowice (Polish: [krapkɔˈvit͡sɛ]; German: Krappitz; Silesian: Krapkowicy) is a town in southern Poland with 16,301 inhabitants (2019), situated in the Opole Voivodeship, straddling both banks of the Oder River at the point where it joins with the Osobłoga. It is the regional capital of Krapkowice County.

Traditionally this Upper Silesian town was a centre for leather, paper and cement manufacturing. Today only the paper and leather industries remain. For example, in Krapkowice the toilet paper brand Mola is produced by a major job provider, Metsä.

Historically, it was known in Polish as Krapkowice, Chrapkowice and Krapowice.

== Gallery ==
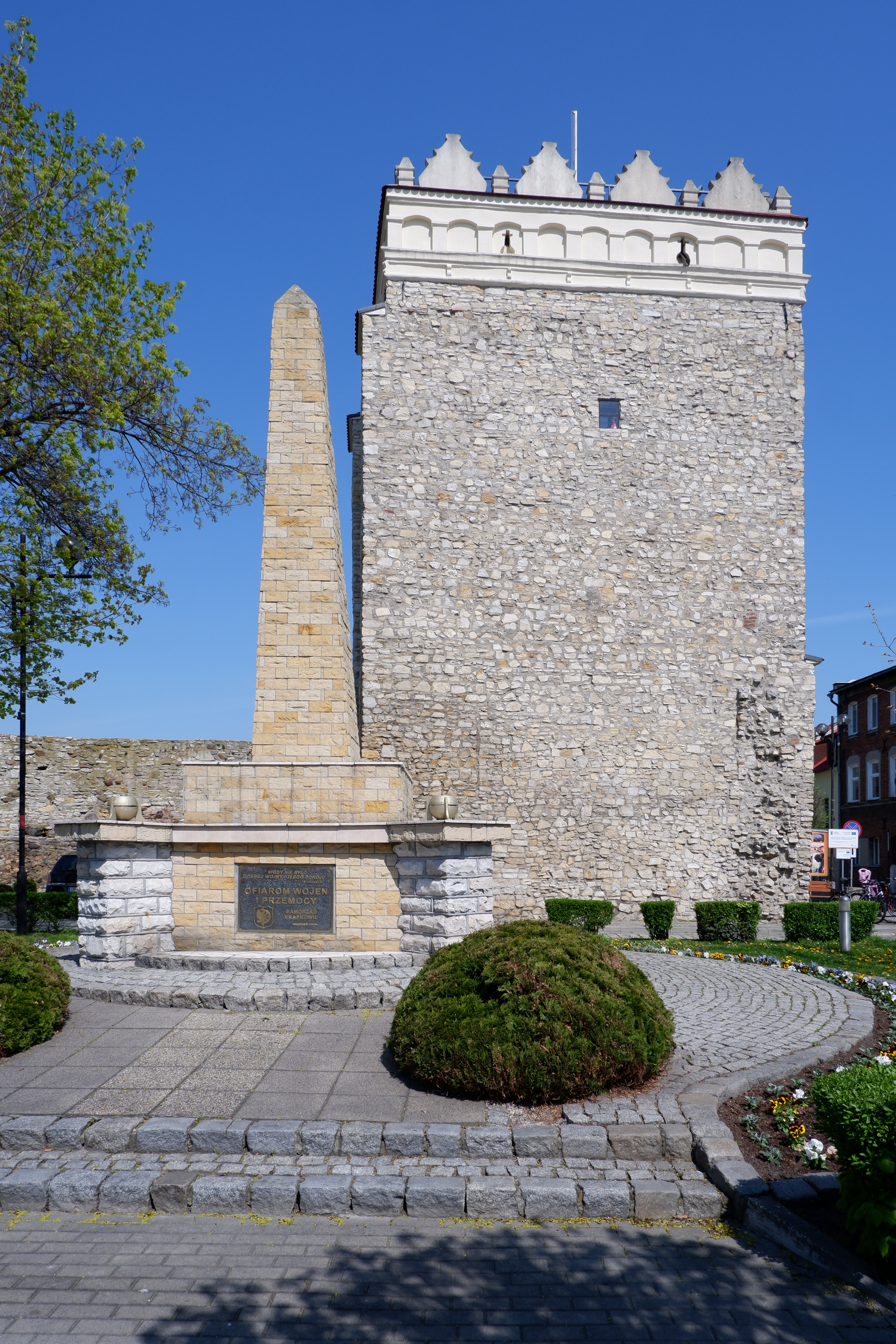
Brama Górna (Upper Gate) and Monument to the Victims of Wars and Violence

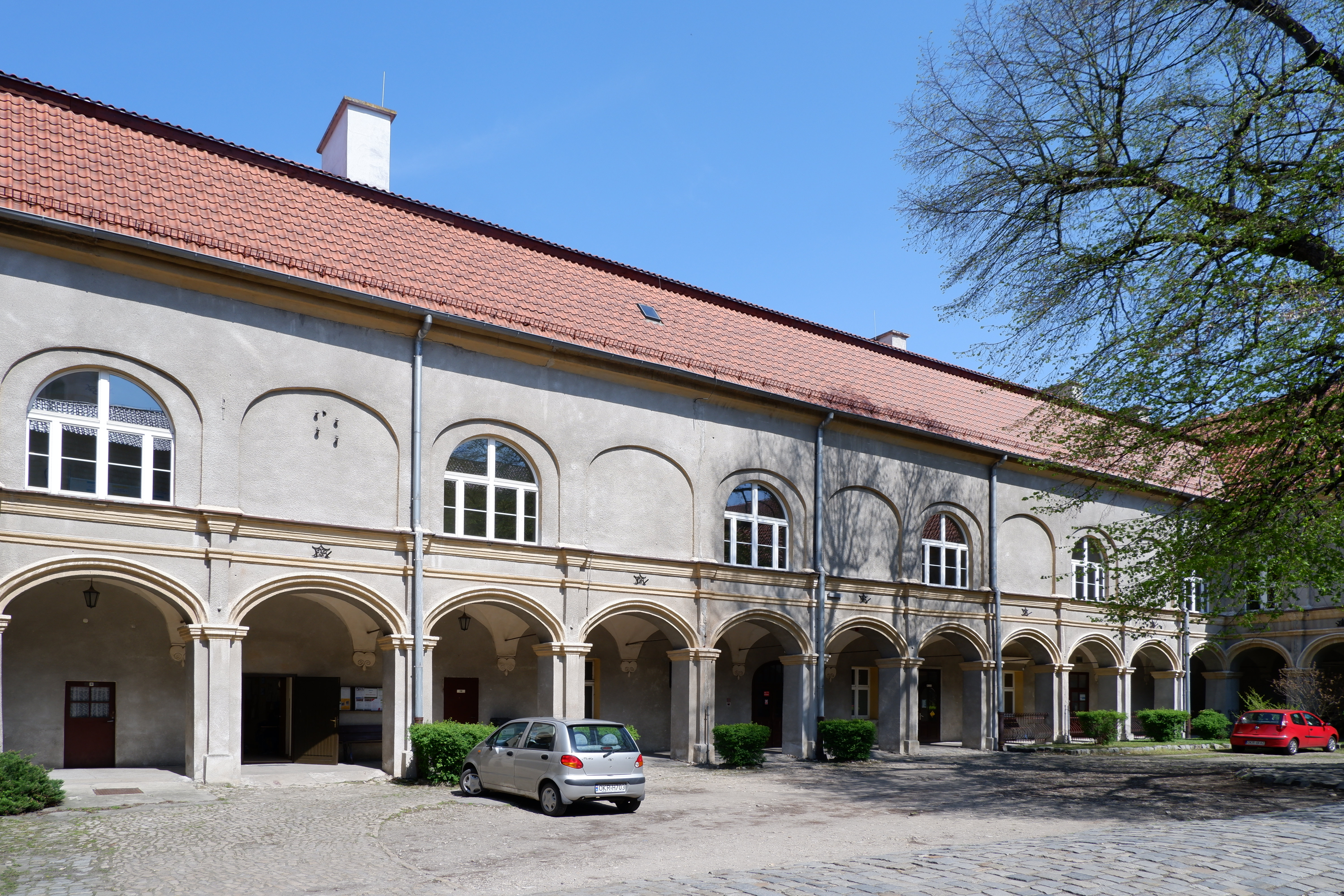
Castle courtyard

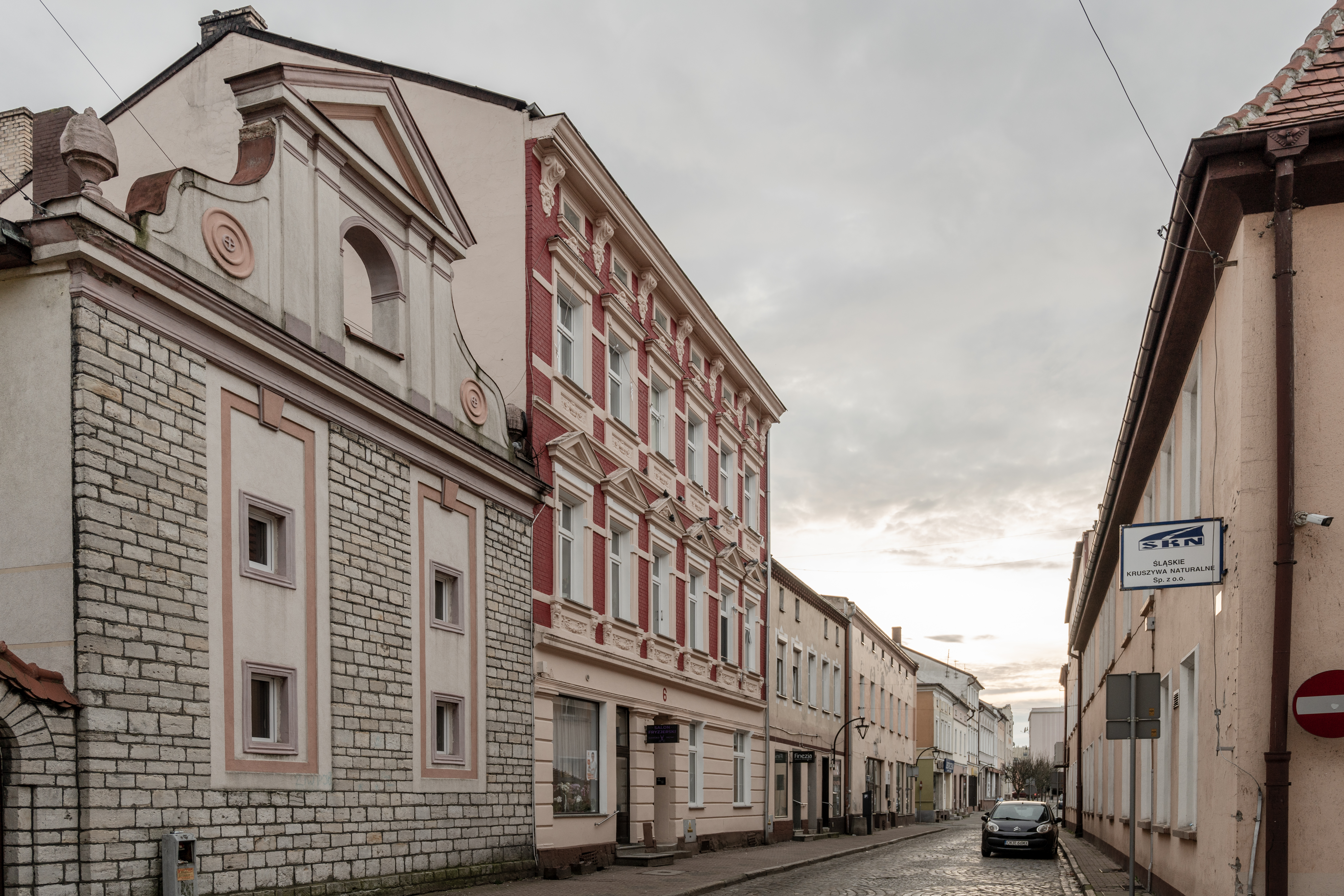
Kościelna Street

== Notable people ==
- Mikuláš Albert z Kaménka (c.1547–1617), Czech priest and translator
- Wilhelm Alexander Freund (1833–1917), gynecologist
- Ottomar Rosenbach (1851–1907), German physician
- Hertha Pohl (1889–1954), writer
- Krzysztof Zwoliński (born 1959), Polish athlete
- Alice Bota (born 1979), Polish-German journalist

== Twin towns – sister cities ==
See twin towns of Gmina Krapkowice.
