= Alcedar =

- Commune and village
- Location in Moldova
- Coordinates: 47°52′N 28°52′E
- Country: Moldova
- District: Șoldănești District

Population (2014)
  - Total: 1,234
- Time zone: UTC+2 (EET)
  - Summer (DST): UTC+3 (EEST)

Alcedar is a commune in Șoldănești District, Moldova. It is composed of three villages: Alcedar, Curătura and Odaia.

== Notable people ==
- Teodor Herța
