= Hertha (given name) =

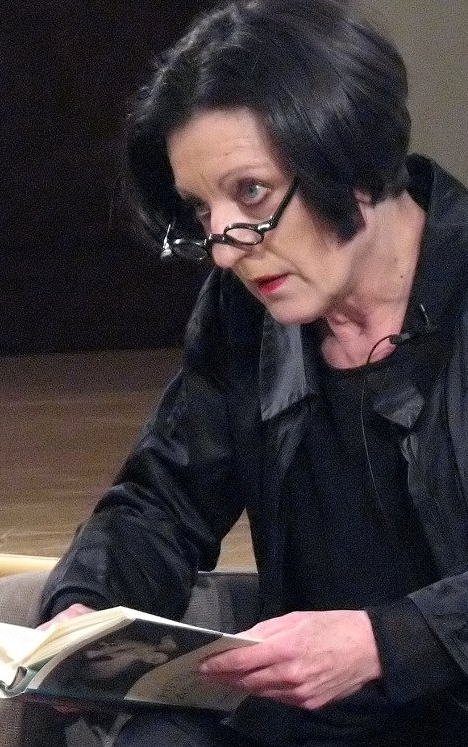
Herta Müller, poet, Nobel Laureate 2009

Hertha is a feminine given name which may refer to:

- Hertha Ayrton (1854–1923), British engineer, mathematician, physicist and inventor
- Hertha Feiler (1916–1970), Austrian actress
- Hertha Feist (1896–1990), German expressionist dancer and choreographer
- Hertha or Herta Glaz (1910–2006), Austrian-born American opera singer, voice teacher and director
- Hertha Guthmar (1904–2003), German film actress
- Hertha Natzler (1911–1985), Austrian stage and film actress
- Hertha Pauli (1906–1973), Austrian journalist, author and actress
- Hermine Hertha Pohl (1889–1954), German writer
- Hertha Sponer (1895–1968), German physicist and chemist
- Hertha Sturm (1886 – before or during 1945), German communist activist born Edith Fischer
- Hertha Thiele (1908–1984), German actress
- Hertha Töpper (1924–2020), Austrian opera singer
- Hertha Wambacher (1903–1950), Austrian physicist
- Hertha von Walther (1903–1987), German actress
