= Viki, Estonia =

Village in Estonia

Coordinates: 58°21′05″N 22°04′40″E

Viki
- Village
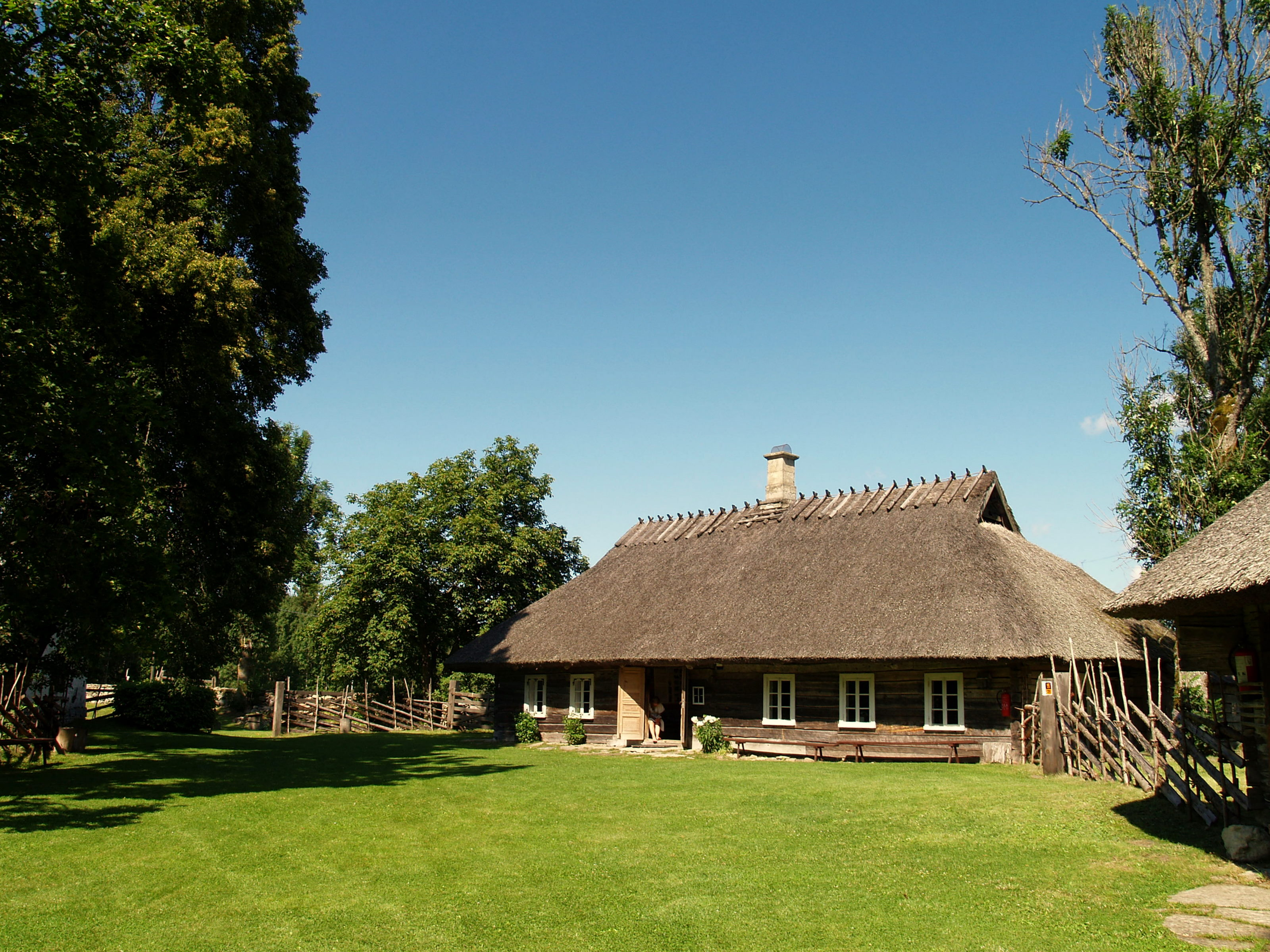
- Mihkli Farm Museum in Viki
- Interactive map of Viki
- Country: Estonia
- County: Saare County
- Parish: Saaremaa Parish
- Time zone: UTC+2 (EET)
  - Summer (DST): UTC+3 (EEST)

Viki is a village in Saaremaa Parish, Saare County, on the western part of Saaremaa Island, Estonia.

Before the administrative reform in 2017, the village was in Kihelkonna Parish.

The composer and organist Peeter Süda (1883–1920) was born at the Tammiku farm in Viki.

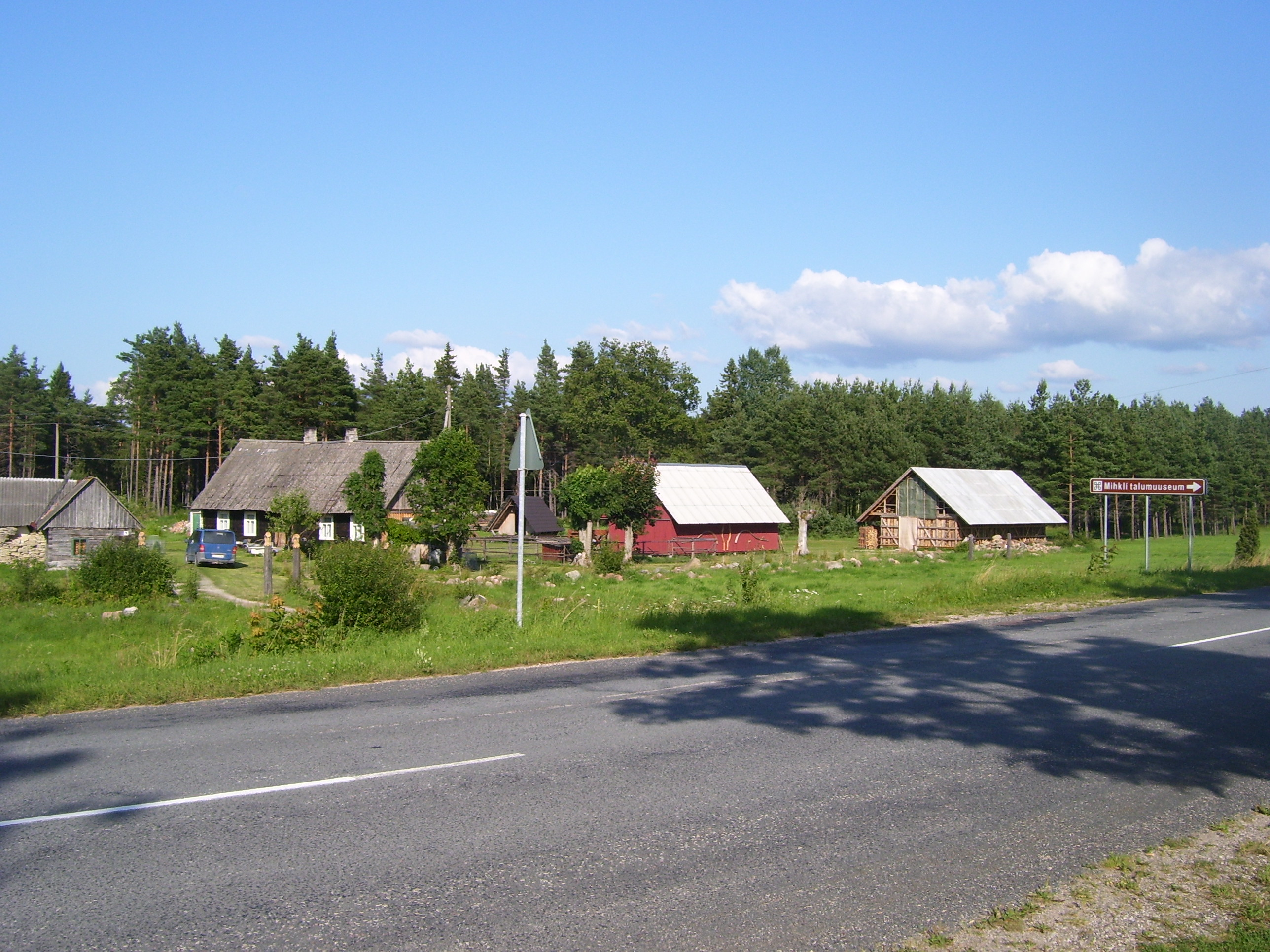
Viki

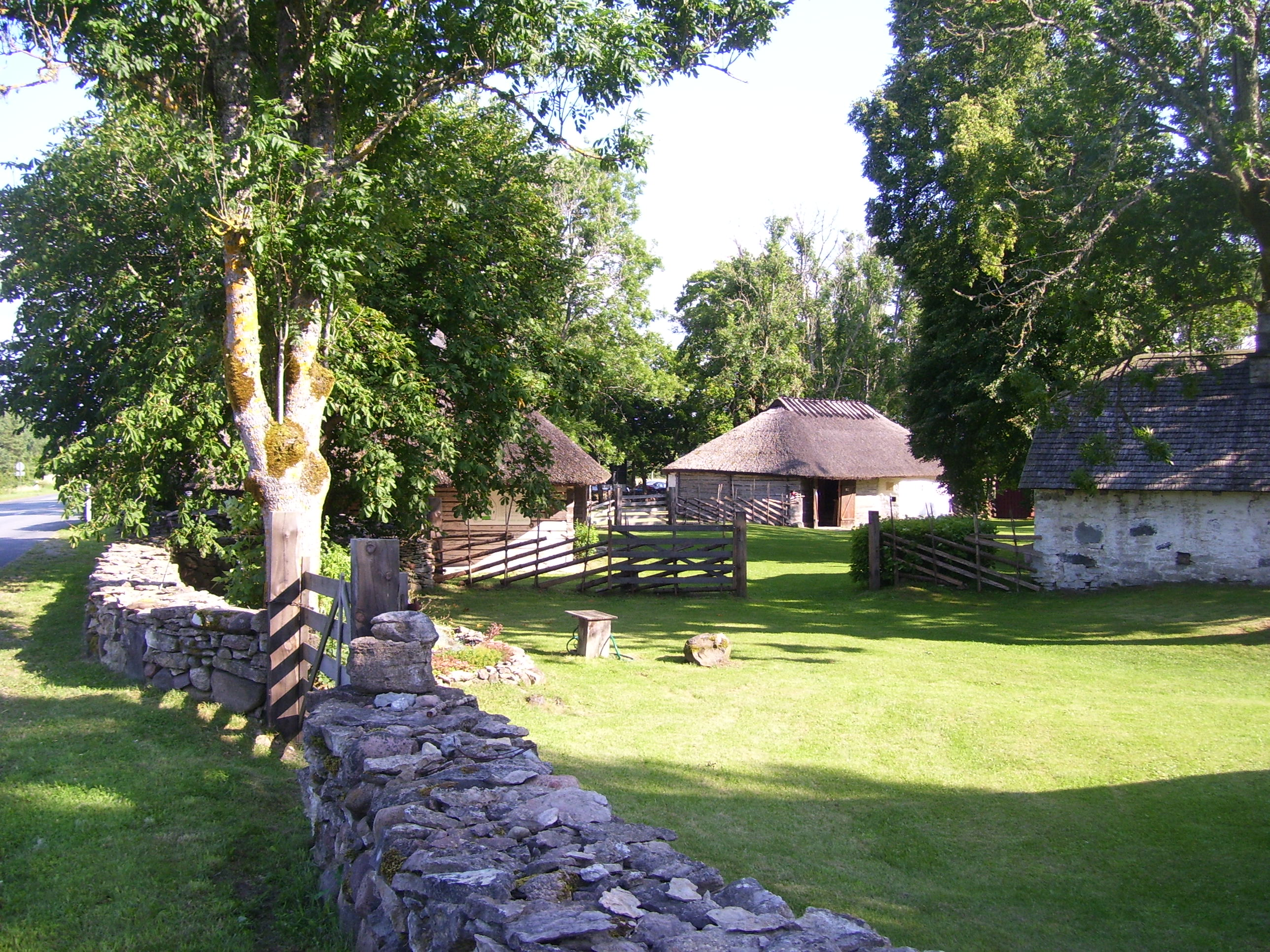
Mihkli Farm Museum

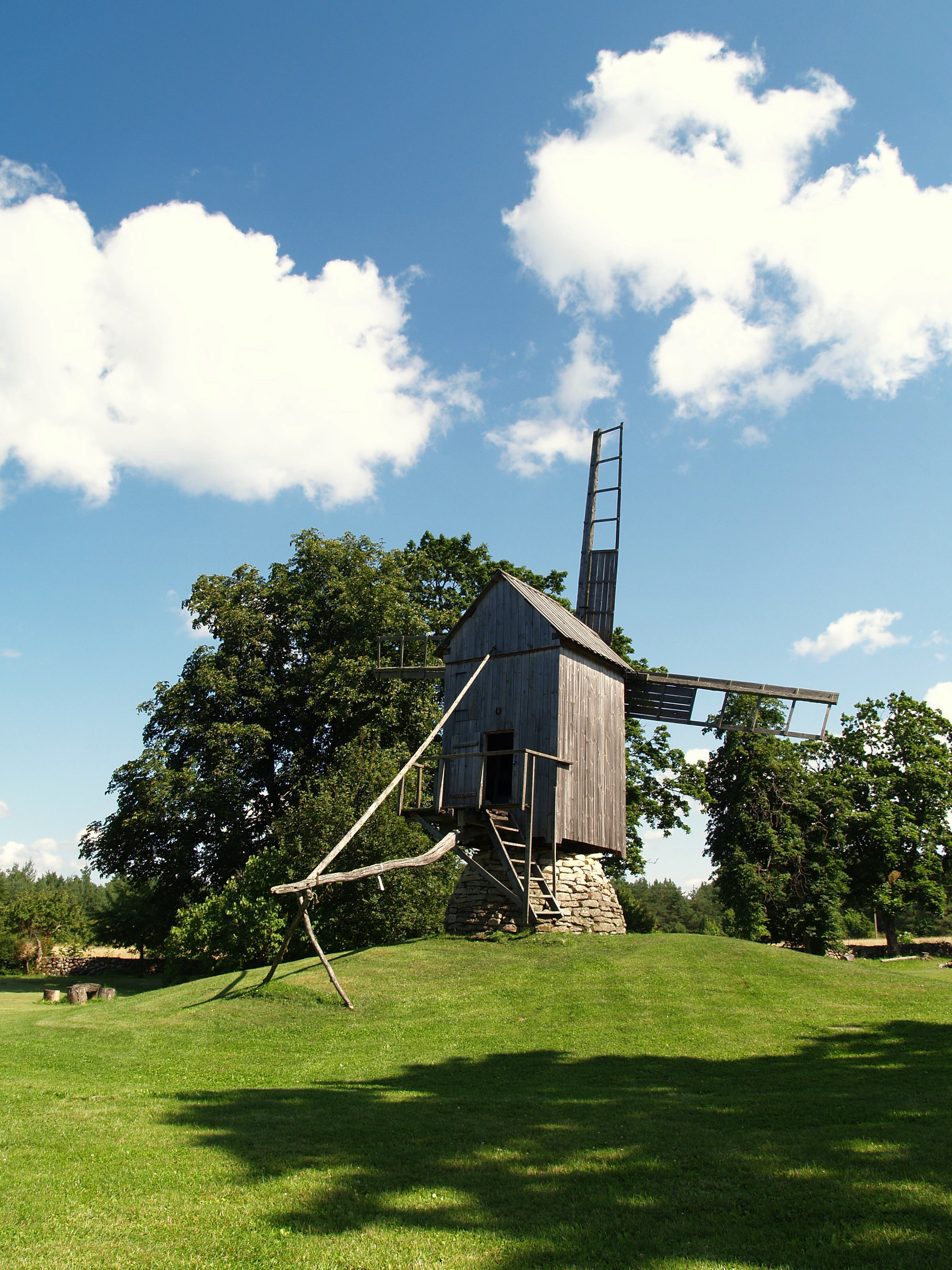
A post mill in the museum
