= Wilhelm Alexander Freund =

German gynecologist (1833–1917)

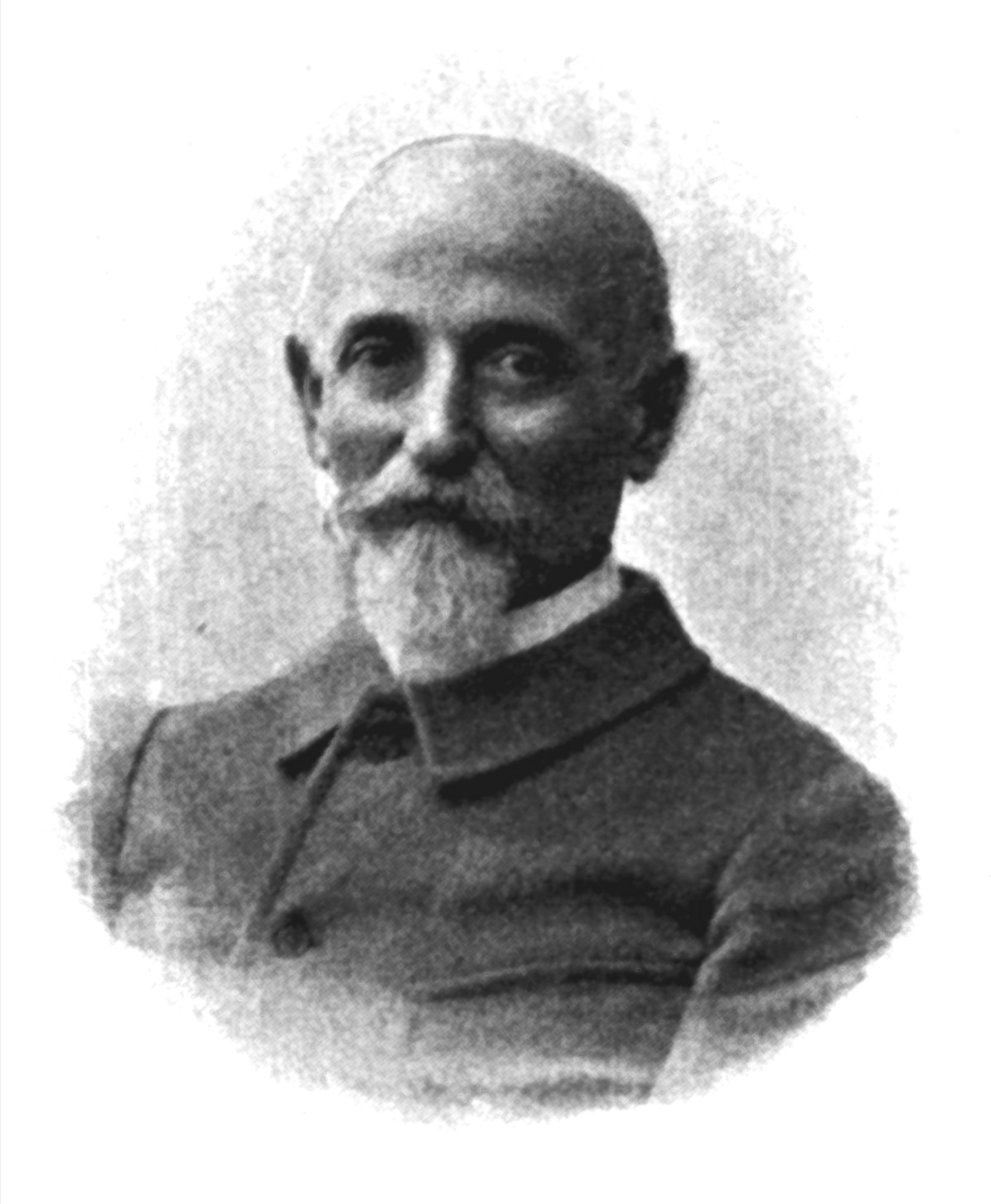
Wilhelm Alexander Freund

Wilhelm Alexander Freund (26 August 1833 – 24 December 1917) was a German gynecologist who was a native of Krappitz, Silesia.

Born into a Jewish family, in 1855 he earned his medical degree at the University of Breslau, afterwards practicing gynecology in the same city. In 1874 he became an associate professor at Breslau. In 1879 he relocated to Strasbourg, where he served as a professor of gynecology and obstetrics. He died in Berlin.

In January 1878, Freund performed the first abdominal extirpation of a cancerous uterus. Twenty years later in 1898, Austrian gynecologist Ernst Wertheim (1864-1920) became the first physician to completely extirpate the uterus via the abdomen.

The eponymous "Freund's anomaly" is a narrowing of the upper thoracic aperture caused by a shortening of the first rib and associated cartilage.

== Written works ==
- Beiträge zur Histologie der Rippenknorpel, Breslau, 1858.
- Der Zusammenhang Gewisser Lungenkrankheiten mit Primären Rippenknorpelanomalien, Erlangen, 1858.
- Eine Neue Methode der Exstirpation des Uterus in Richard von Volkmann's "Sammlung Klinischer Vorträge", 1885, No. 133.
- Die Gynäkologische Klinik, Strasburg, 1891.
