= Razdolnoye, Mazanovsky District, Amur Oblast =

Razdolnoye Раздольное
- Selo
- Location within Amur Oblast Location within Russia
- Coordinates: 51°32′N 129°01′E
- Country: Russia
- Region: Amur Oblast
- District: Mazanovsky District
- Time zone: UTC+9:00

Razdolnoye (Russian: Раздольное) is a rural locality (a selo) and the administrative center of Romankautsky Selsoviet of Mazanovsky District, Amur Oblast, Russia. The population was 150 as of 2018. There are 10 streets.

== Geography ==
Razdolnoye is located on the right bank of the Kamenushka River, 23 km southeast of Novokiyevsky Uval (the district's administrative centre) by road. Romankautsy is the nearest rural locality.
