= Estonian Theatre and Music Museum =

Museum in Tallinn

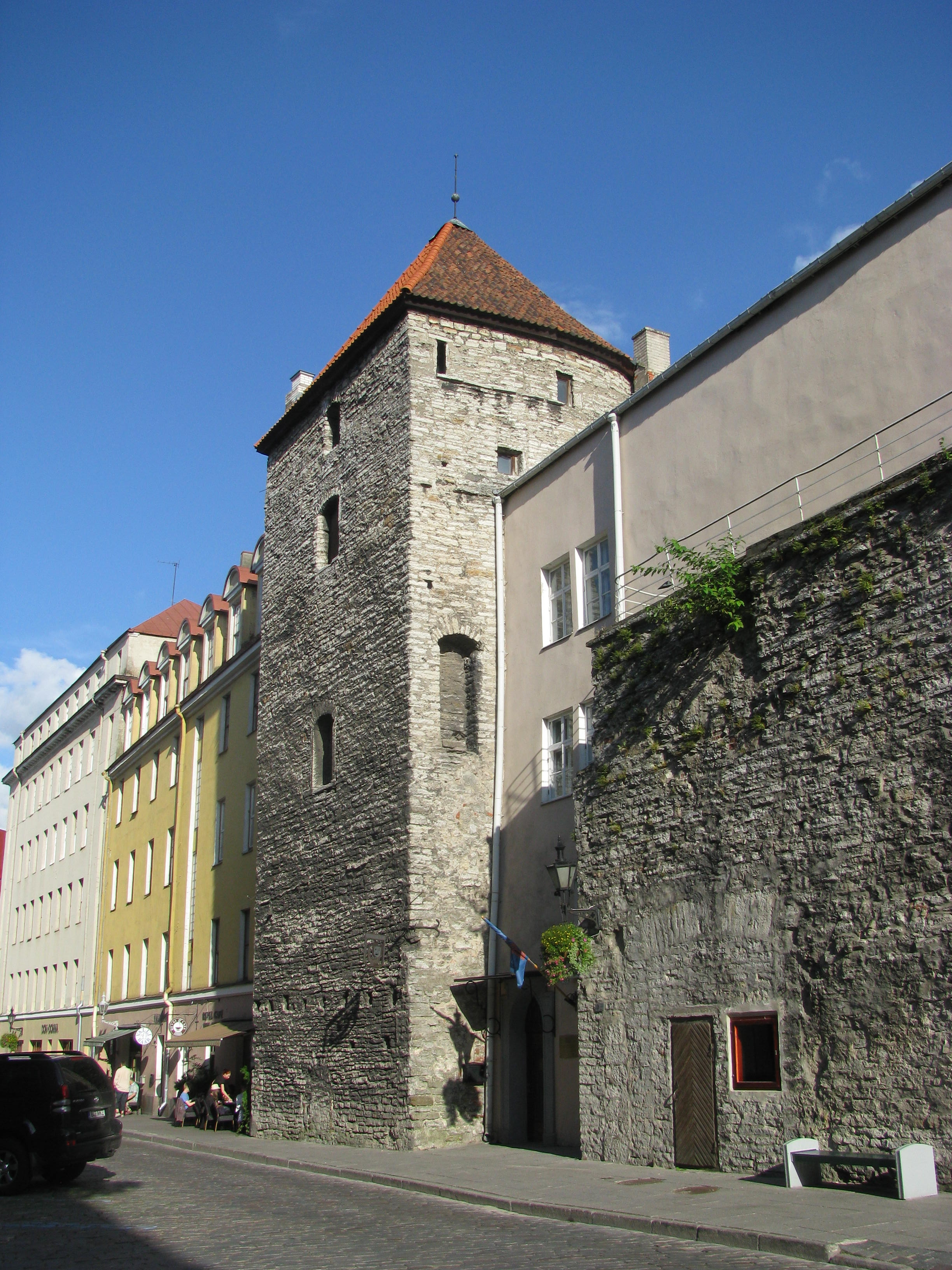
- Established: 1924
- Location: Tallinn, Estonia
- Coordinates: 59°26′5.33″N 24°44′42.78″E
- Founder: Peeter Süda

Estonian Theatre and Music Museum is a national museum located in the old town of Tallinn, Estonia. The museum was established in 1924.

== History ==
The Estonian Theatre and Music Museum was established in 1924. Estonian music composer Peeter Süda made a huge collection of musical instruments, notes, books and other things. The purpose behind establishing this was preserving his collections.

== Collection ==
The museum has a large collection of musical and theatrical instruments and props made by local craftsmen and made outside Estonia. The museum has two main departments— music department and theatre department. The music department has musical instruments and hand-written songs and notes of notable music composers. The theatre department provides an overview of the Estonian theatre. There are collections of old theatre photos, costumes and documents. The museum has a separate library.

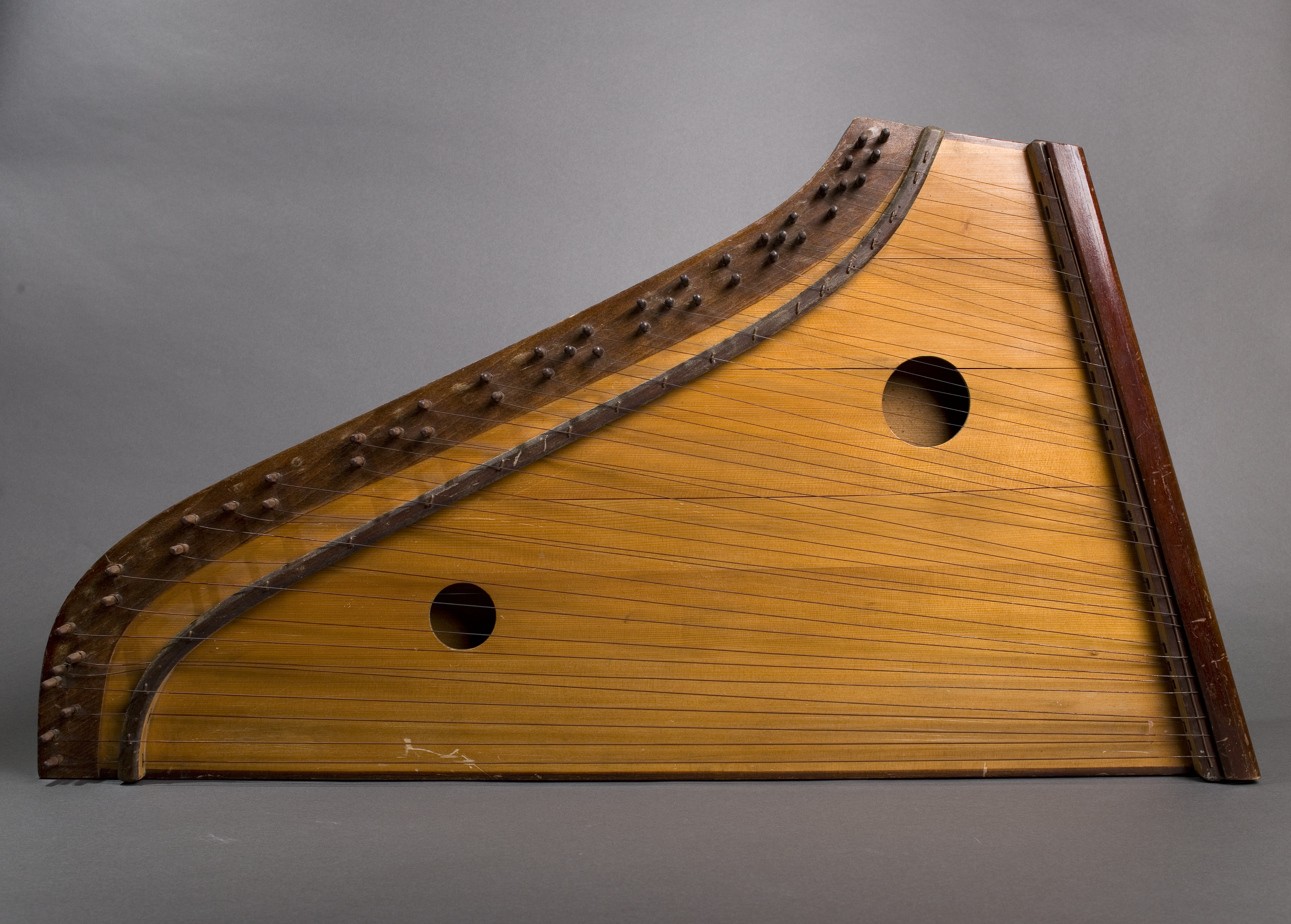
Chromatic kannel

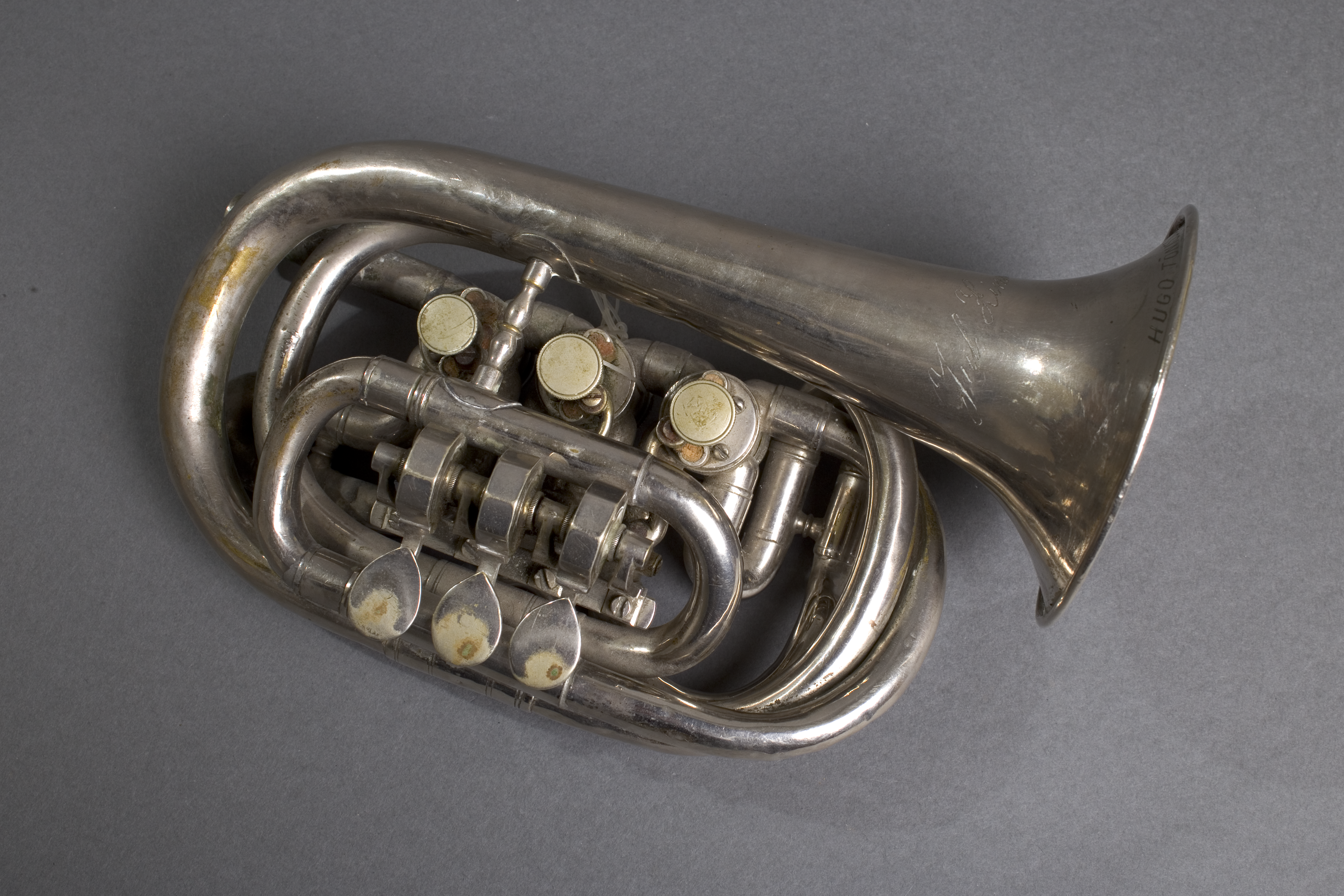
Cornet

Jauram

== See also ==
- List of music museums
