= Hertha Pohl =

German writer

Hermine "Hertha" Pohl (24 July 1889 – 4 October 1954) was a German writer. She wrote twelve published books between 1922 and 1950.

== Life ==
=== Private ===
Hertha Pohl was born on 24 July 1889 in Krappitz, Upper Silesia, the daughter of a house painter and his wife. Together with her brother, she was raised by her grandmother, as her father's low income made it necessary for her ailing mother to work by hand to support the poor household. Nevertheless, the parents made it possible for their son to attend a grammar school. He passed on his knowledge of German literature and other fields of knowledge to his sister, who also received many fairy tales and stories from her grandmother. The grandmother also constantly took care of the purchase of new books.

After her school education, Pohl took a job as a reader with a highly gifted but blind lady in Breslau. This attempt to earn money on her own failed because she was homesick. Back in Krappitz she found work and income as a copyist of embroidery patterns in a small carpet factory. After a few years, she moved to Berlin at the age of 18 to join relatives, where she learned the craft of blouse sewing and worked in a blouse tailor's shop. Despite a working day of ten hours, she visited the theatre and read Reclam booklets she had saved. After seven years in the business, she left the blouse tailoring department and found a new job in the sewing department of a tapestry factory. In her comparatively undemanding work she was able to give free rein to her literary thoughts. In her spare time, the collected stories were written down. This was further encouraged by a new job in a lingerie shop.

During the First World War in 1915 she returned early to her parents' home in Krappitz, where she devoted herself entirely to her literary work in addition to caring for her sick mother.

In 1931 Pohl moved to Freiburg im Breisgau. She spent the last two years until her death on 4 October 1954 in St. Elisabethstift, an old people's home in Freiburg im Breisgau.

=== Work ===
Her first sketch, published in 1921 in the Sunday supplement of Vorwärts, was a story from the world of the working people, concise and simple, darkly tinted and of a strange fidelity to reality. Soon after, the first volume of her entire narrative was published. After Herder Verlag had expressed an interest and her first novel was published by Kölnische Volkszeitung, her literary reputation was finally established. Throughout her life, Pohl was afflicted by illnesses and severe strokes of fate, but honourable words full of recognition, e.g. from Enrica von Handel-Mazzetti, lovingly encouraged her to continue her work and mature. In almost all of her works a reference can be found to the Krappitz of former times.

Pohl has remained the poet of the poor ever since her first story. Nevertheless, no references can be found in her works to the economic and political problems of the time. She was not a revolutionary and did not strive for social change; in her works she was much more reminiscent of a Christian's point of view, demanding compassion and understanding for the needy.

== Works ==
- Armes Volk, Habelschwerdt 1923
- Auf der Lebensstraße, Freiburg i. Br. 1927
- Der barmherzige Samaritan, Freiburg i. Br. 1950
- Der Vorhang fällt, Bonn 1933
- Der Weg der Martina Förster, Dillingen 1923
- Die Bettelgret, Dillingen 1923
- Die klagende Nacht, Dillingen 1922
- Ich bin der Betroffene, München 1954
- Im Thymian, Schweidnitz 1928
- Mir ist recht geschehen, Freiburg i. Br. 1934
- Tina Stawiks Ernte, Freiburg i. Br. 1924
- Vom alten Schlag, Hildesheim 1925

== Literature ==
- Hans Thomas Cebulla: Vor 50 Jahren starb Herta Pohl, unsere Krappitzer Dichterin. In: Krappitzer Heimatblatt. Nr. 178/Autumn 2004. H. Th. Cebulla (Hrsg.), pp. 7–9
- Joanna Rostropowicz (Hrsg.): Schlesier. Von den frühsten Zeiten bis zur Gegenwart. Edition 1. Wydawnictwo Instytut Slaski, Oppeln 2005, ISBN 83-88672-77-0
