= Herthasee =

Herthasee may refer to the following lakes in Germany:

- Herthasee (Rügen)
- Herthasee (Holzappel), a lake in Rhineland-Palatinate
