= SMS Hertha =

Two ships of the German Kaiserliche Marine (Imperial Navy) have been named SMS Hertha:

- SMS Hertha (1864), a screw frigate launched in 1864
- SMS Hertha (1897), a protected cruiser launched in 1897
