= Ansomardi =

Estonian writer and military person

Peäro-August Pitka (1865-1915), also known for his pseudonym Ansomardi, was an Estonian children's writer and officer in the Russian czarist army. His younger brother was Johan Pitka, a rear admiral and hero of the Estonian War of Independence.

== Books ==
=== Stories ===
- Jalgsemaa Kitse-eide muinasjutud (1901)
- Kaks sündinud lugu (1904)
- Poolik elu (1904)
- Elu-pudemed (1909)
- Sõja päivilt (1910)
- Lastejutud (1911)
- Jalgsemaa Kitse-eide muinasjutud ja teisi jutte (1979)

=== Plays ===
- Murieide tütar (1900)
- Matsil unes, teistel ilmsi (1901)

=== Miscellaneous ===
- Võimlemise ehk Gümnastika õpetus (1904)
- Sõjamehe sõnastik (1914)
