= Teodor Herța =

Bessarabian politician

Member of the Sfatul Țării
- In office 1917–1918

Personal details
- Born: February 2, 1891 Alcedar, Moldova

Teodor Herța (February 2, 1891 in Alcedar, Moldova) was a Bessarabian politician, deputy in Sfatul Țării, council that exercised the legislative power in the Moldavian Democratic Republic, between 1917 and 1918.^{:p. 71}

== Biography ==
He served as Member of the Sfatul Țării (1917–1918).

== Gallery ==
Moldovan stamp, 1998
