= Hertsa (river) =

Hertsa Herța
- Location within Chernivtsi Oblast Location within Romania
- Native name: Herța (Romanian); Герца (Ukrainian)

Location
- Country: Romania, Ukraine
- Counties: Botoșani County, Chernivtsi Oblast
- Villages: Fundu Herții, Hertsa

Physical characteristics
- Mouth: Prut
  - coordinates: 48.1870°N 26.3122°E
- Discharge
  - location: Border with Ukraine
  - minimum: 0 m^{3}/s (0 cu ft/s)
  - maximum: 19.75 m^{3}/s (697 cu ft/s)

Basin features
- Progression: Prut→ Danube→ Black Sea
- Tributaries
  - left: Maranda
  - right: Baranca

The Hertsa or Hertza (Romanian: Herța; Ukrainian: Герца) is a right tributary of the river Prut in Romania and Ukraine. It flows through the town Hertsa, and discharges into the Prut near Marshyntsi. In Romania, its length is 6 km (3.7 mi) and its basin size is 23 km^{2} (8.9 sq mi).
