= Halliste Parish =

Former municipality of Estonia

Coordinates: 58°9′52″N 25°26′25″E

Halliste Parish Halliste vald
- Municipality of Estonia
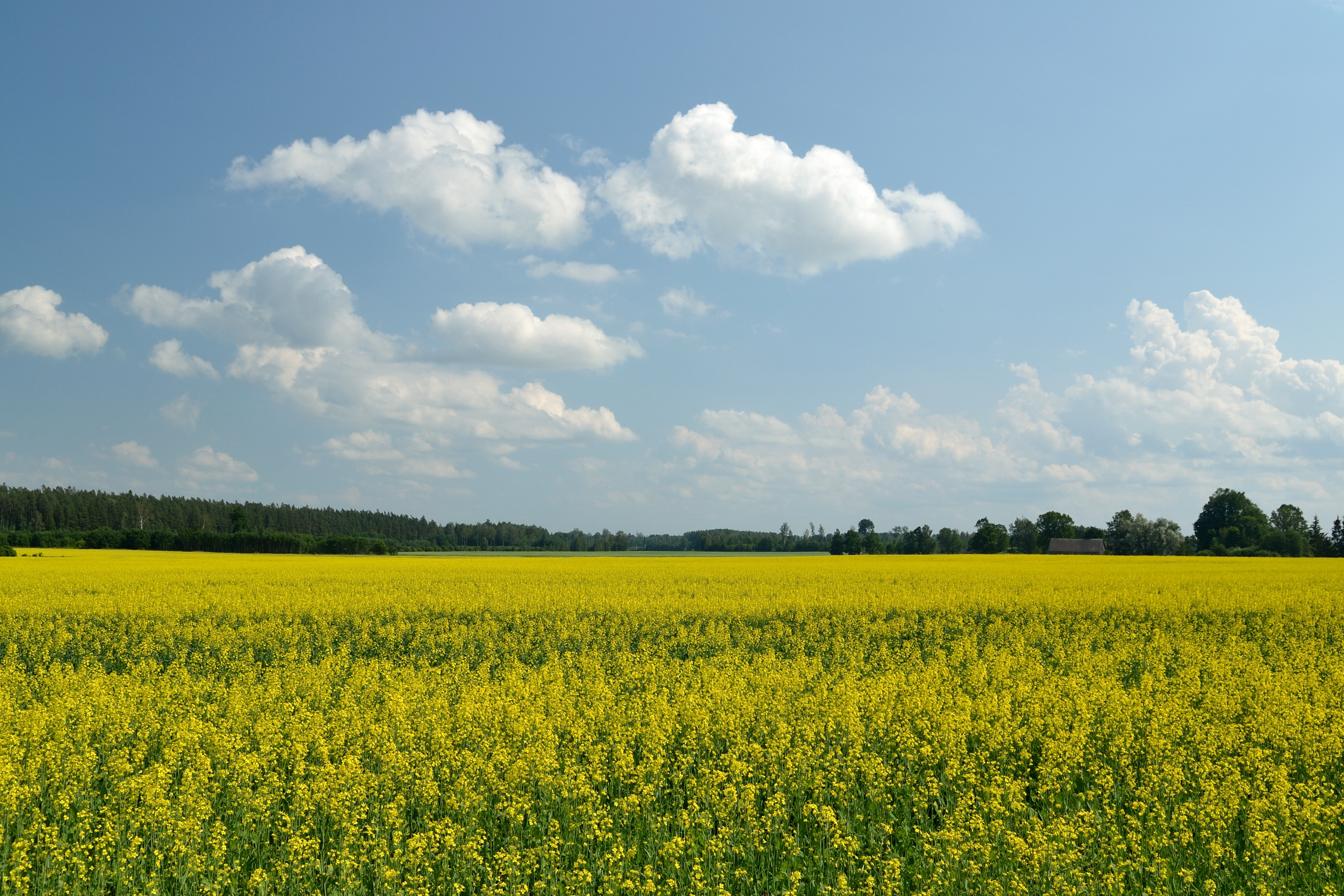

- Flag Coat of arms

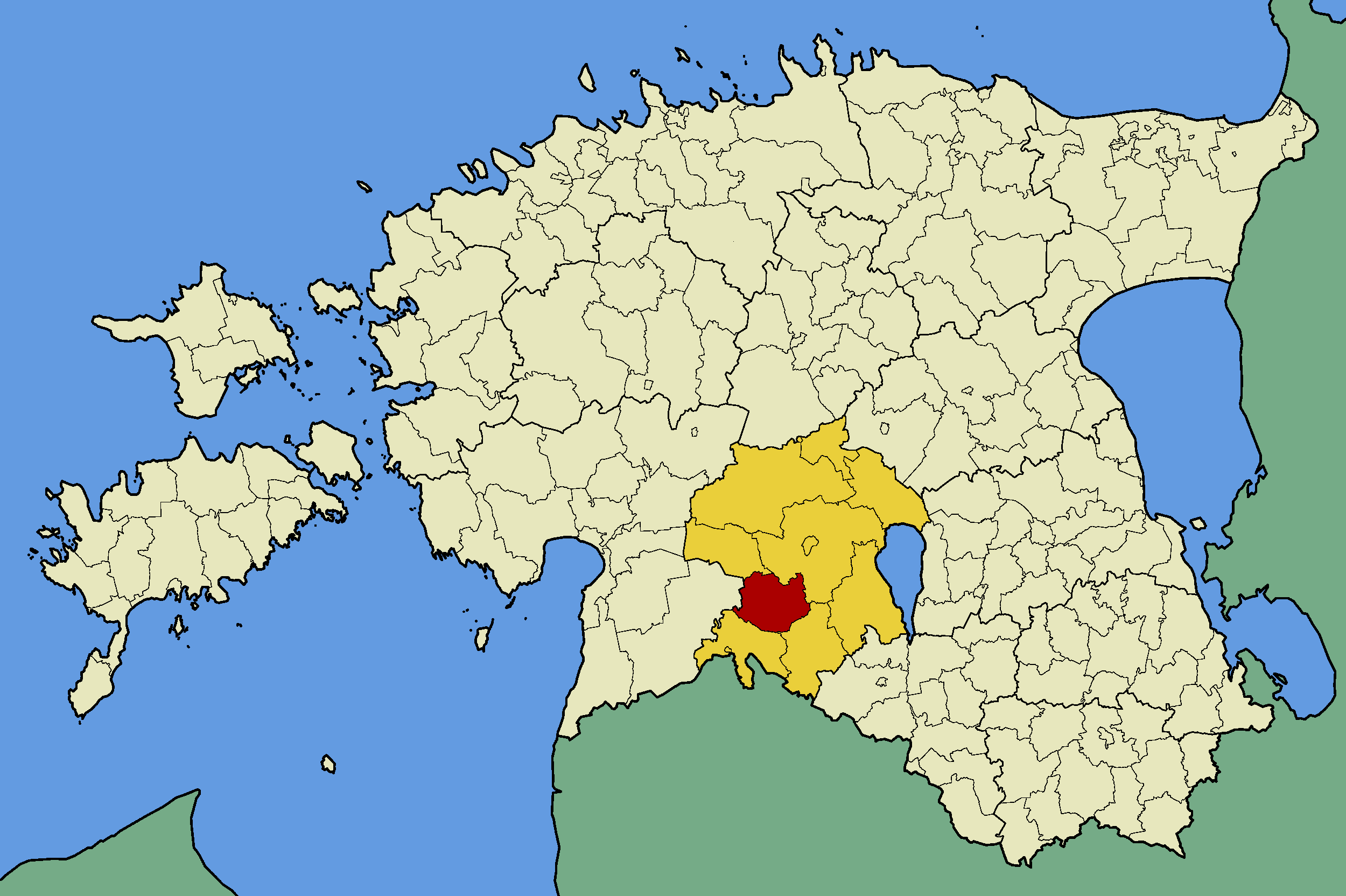
- Halliste Parish in 2009 within Viljandi County.
- Country: Estonia
- County: Viljandi County
- Administrative centre: Halliste

Area
  - Total: 267.09 km^{2} (103.12 sq mi)

Population (01.01.2009)
  - Total: 1,808
  - Density: 6.769/km^{2} (17.53/sq mi)
- Website: www.halliste.ee

Halliste Parish (Estonian: Halliste vald) was a rural municipality of Estonia, in Viljandi County. In 2009, it had a population of 1,808 (as of 1 January 2009) and an area of 267.09 km².

After the municipal elections held on 15 October 2017, Halliste Parish was merged with Abja and Karksi parishes and the town of Mõisaküla to form a new Mulgi Parish.

== Settlements ==
Small boroughs

Halliste - Õisu

Villages

Ereste - Hõbemäe - Kaarli - Kalvre - Kulla - Maru - Mõõnaste - Mulgi - Naistevalla - Niguli - Päidre - Päigiste - Pornuse - Raja - Rimmu - Saksaküla - Sammaste - Tilla - Toosi - Ülemõisa - Uue-Kariste - Vabamatsi - Vana-Kariste

== Gallery ==
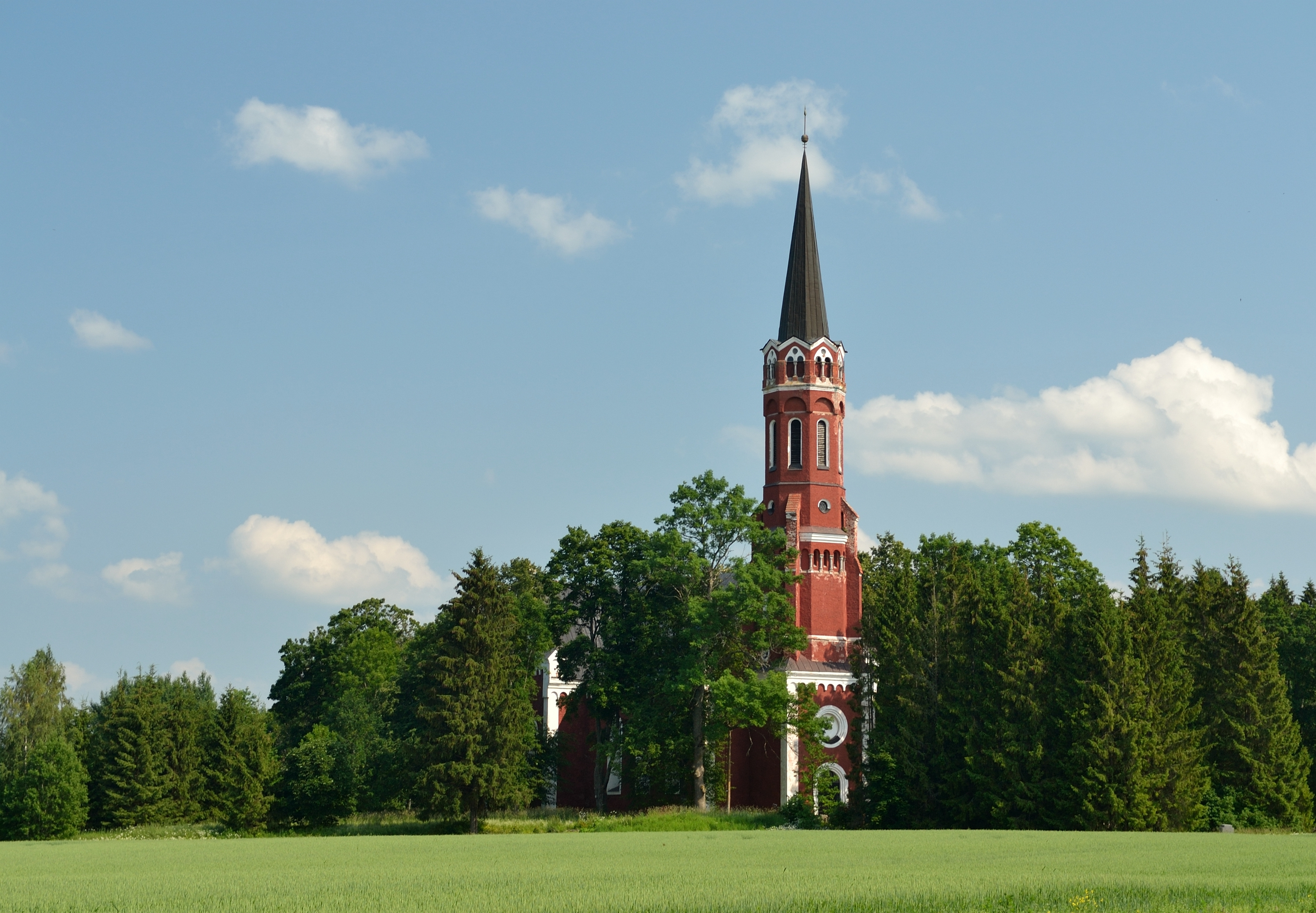
Halliste Holy Anna Church

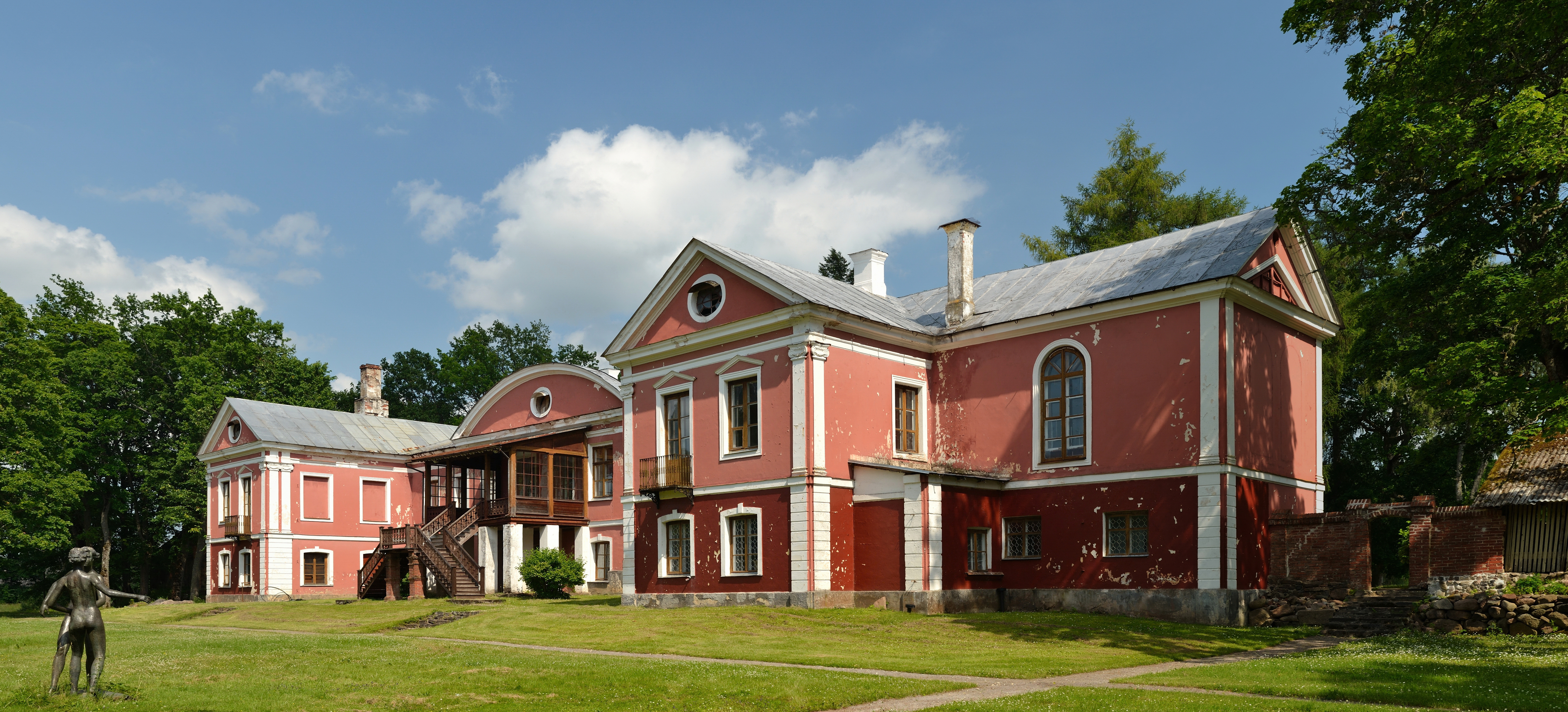
Õisu Manor

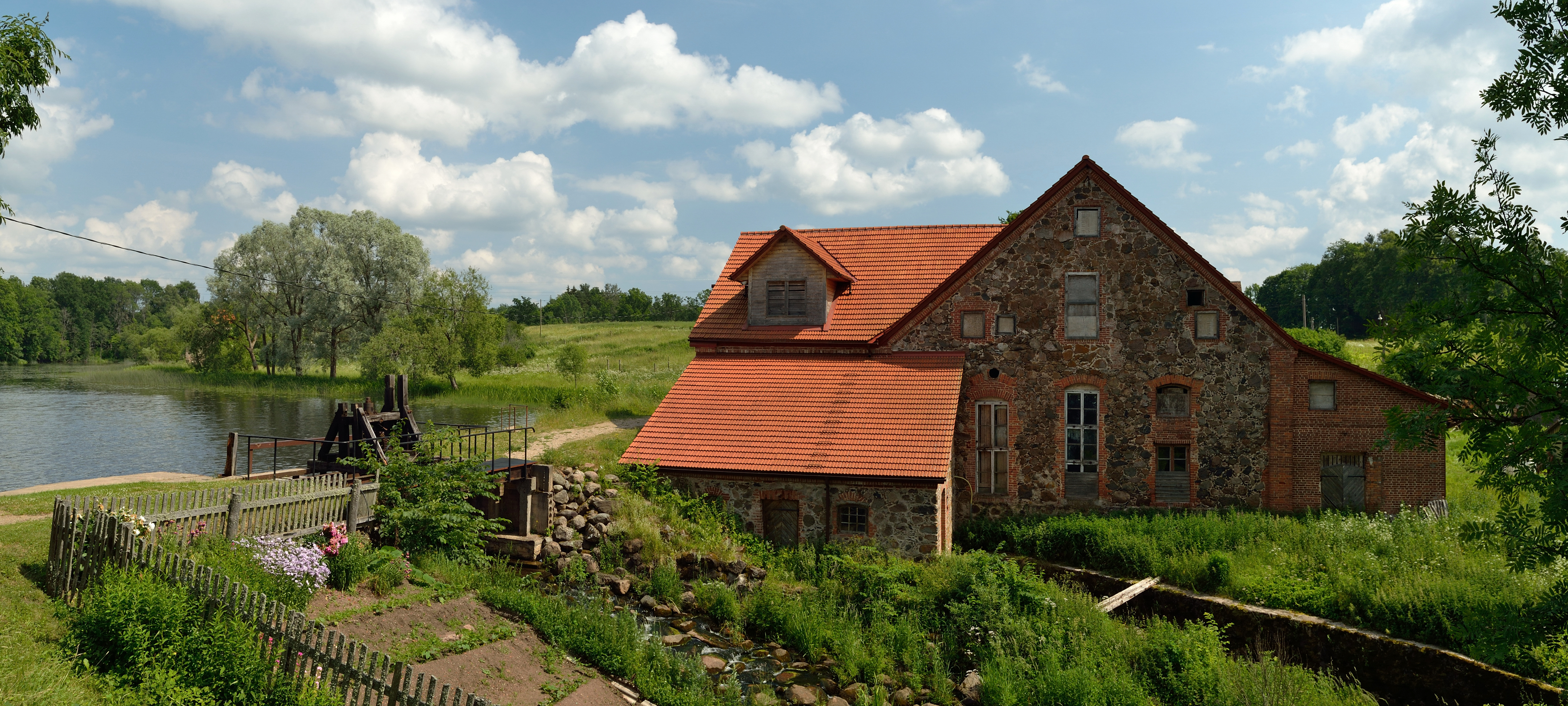
Watermill of Õisu Manor

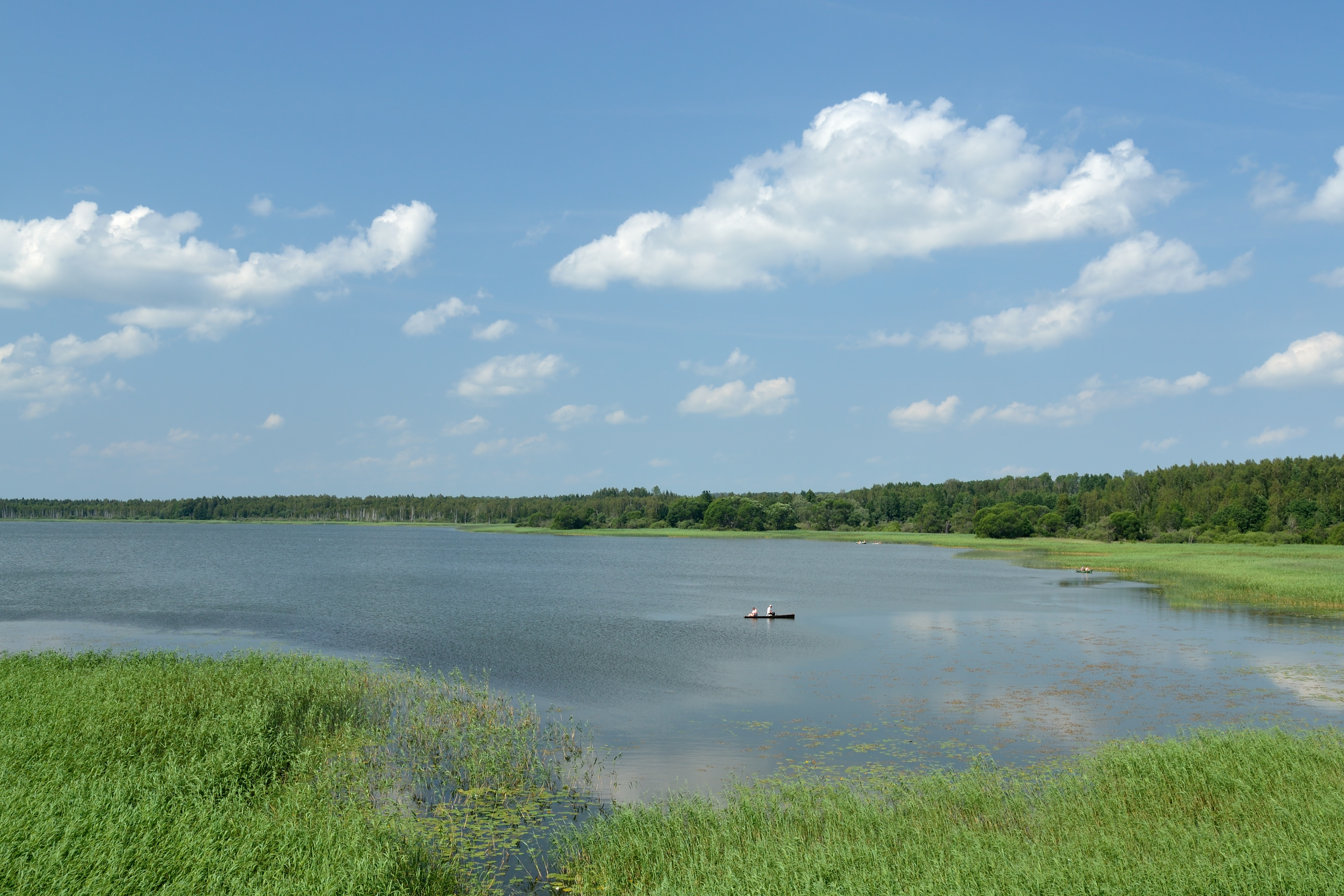
Lake Õisu

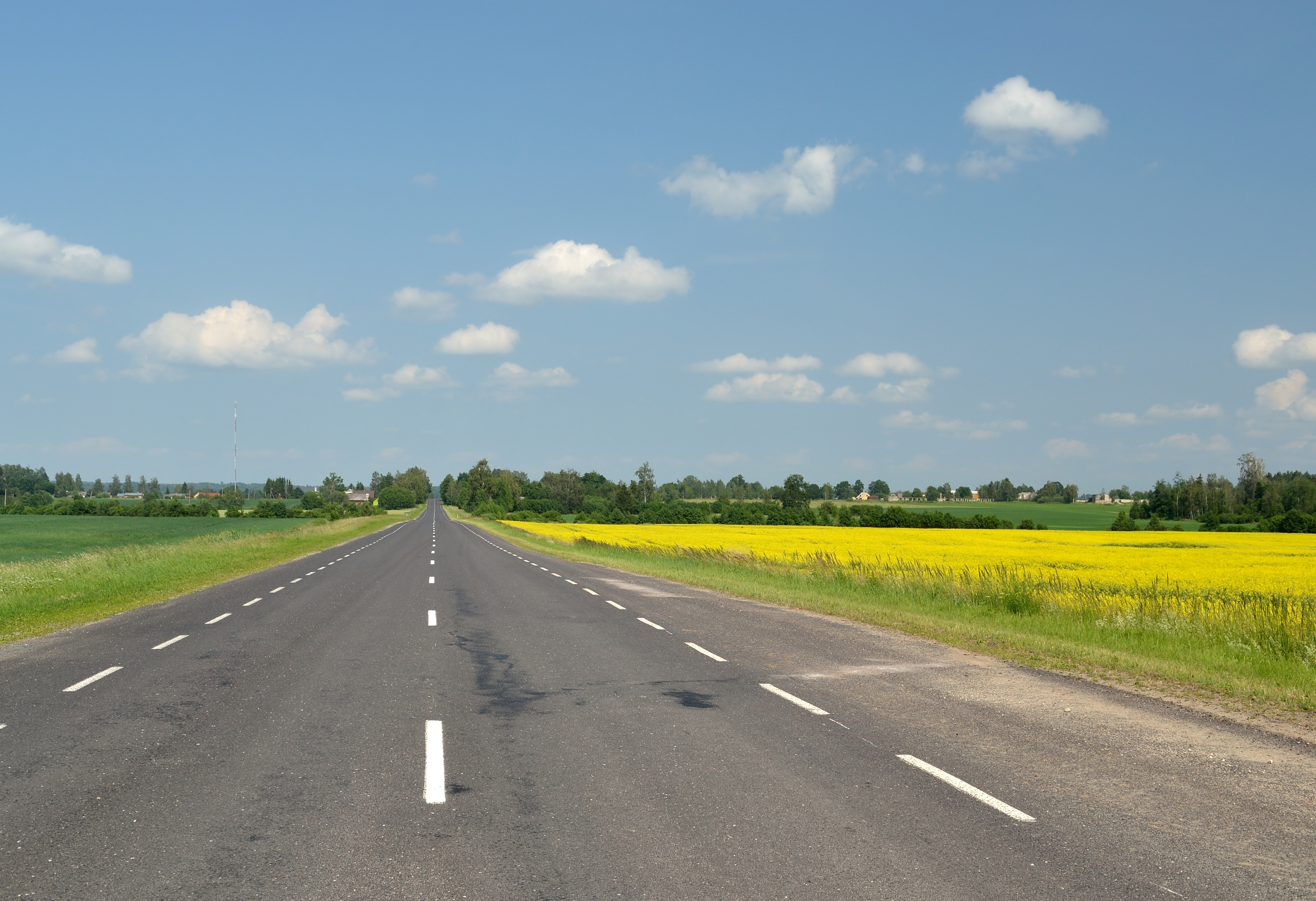
Road in Toosi village
