= Karksi Parish =

Former municipality of Estonia (1999-2017)

Coordinates: 58°6′57″N 25°35′2″E

Karksi Parish Karksi vald
- Municipality of Estonia
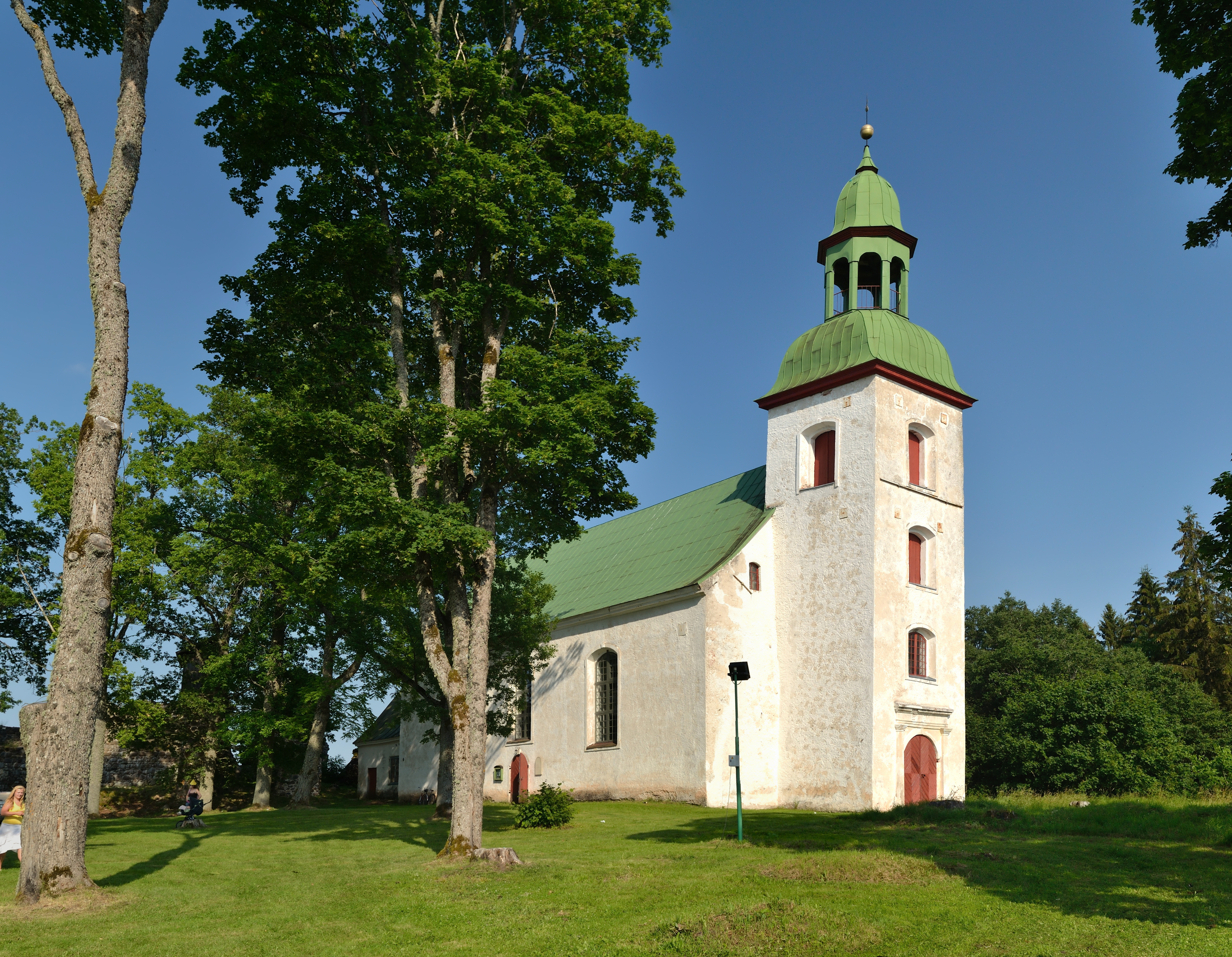
- Karksi church in the village of Karksi

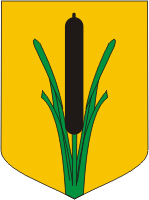
- Flag Coat of arms

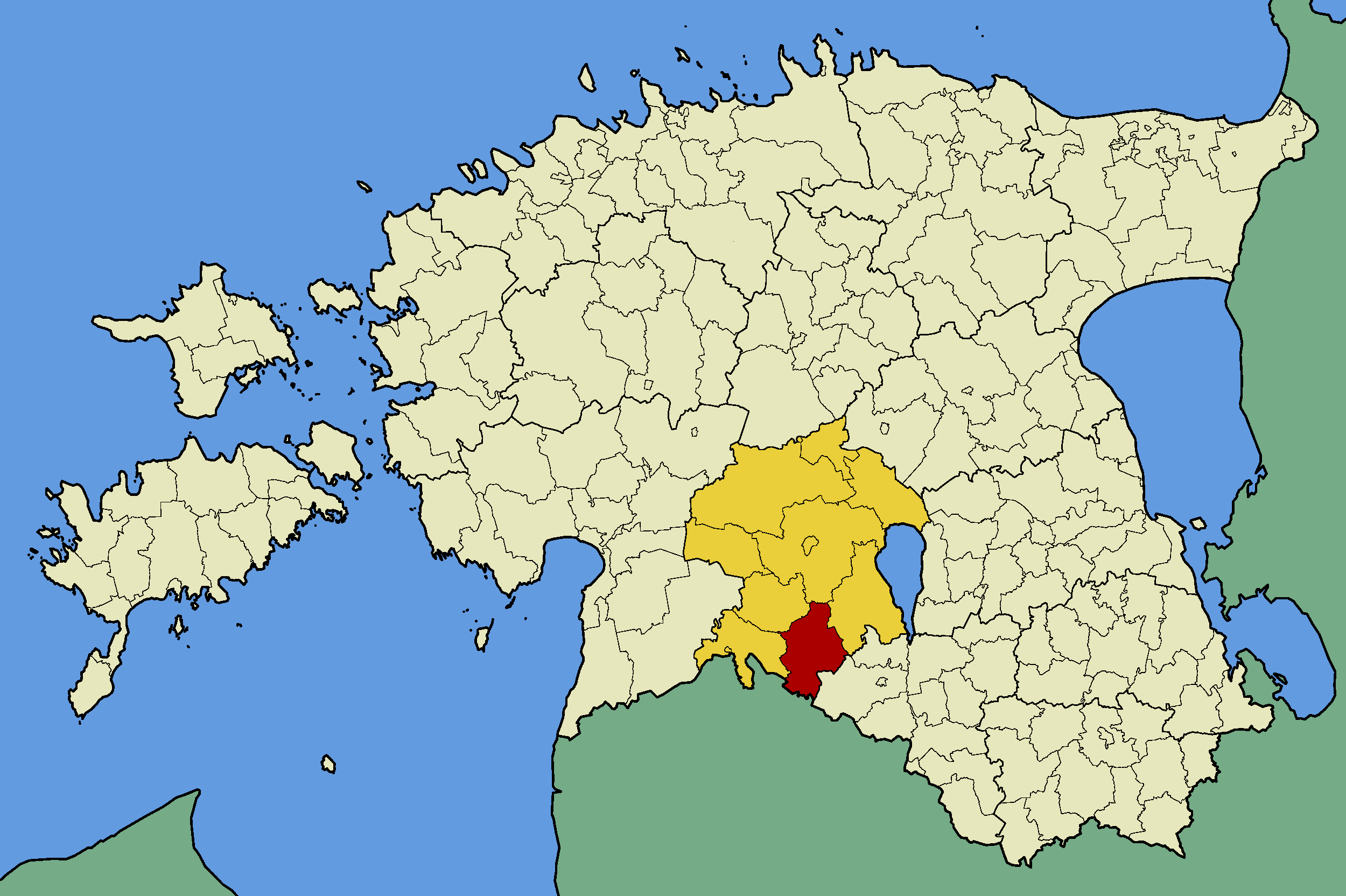
- Karksi Parish in 2009 within Viljandi County.
- Country: Estonia
- County: Viljandi County
- Administrative centre: Karksi-Nuia

Area
  - Total: 321.45 km^{2} (124.11 sq mi)

Population (01.01.2009)
  - Total: 4,041
  - Density: 12.57/km^{2} (32.56/sq mi)
- Website: www.karksi.ee

Karksi Parish (Estonian: Karksi vald) was a rural municipality of Estonia, in Viljandi County. In 2009, it has a population of 4,041 (as of 1 January 2009) and an area of 321.45 km^{2}.

After the municipal elections held on 15 October 2017, Karksi Parish was merged with Abja and Halliste parishes and the town of Mõisaküla to form a new Mulgi Parish.

== Settlements ==
Town

Karksi-Nuia

Villages

Ainja - Allaste - Äriküla - Hirmuküla - Karksi - Kõvaküla - Leeli - Lilli - Mäeküla - Metsaküla - Morna - Muri - Oti - Pärsi - Polli - Pöögle - Sudiste - Suuga - Tuhalaane - Univere

== History ==
Karksi was first mentioned in documents in 1241. In the 13th century the parish and the castle emerged. St. Peter's Church in Karksi with its striking tower was built on a side wall of the castle of the Teutonic Order destroyed in 1708. Today's Karksi mansion was built in the 18th century in the Early Classicist style.

== Ordensburg Karkus ==
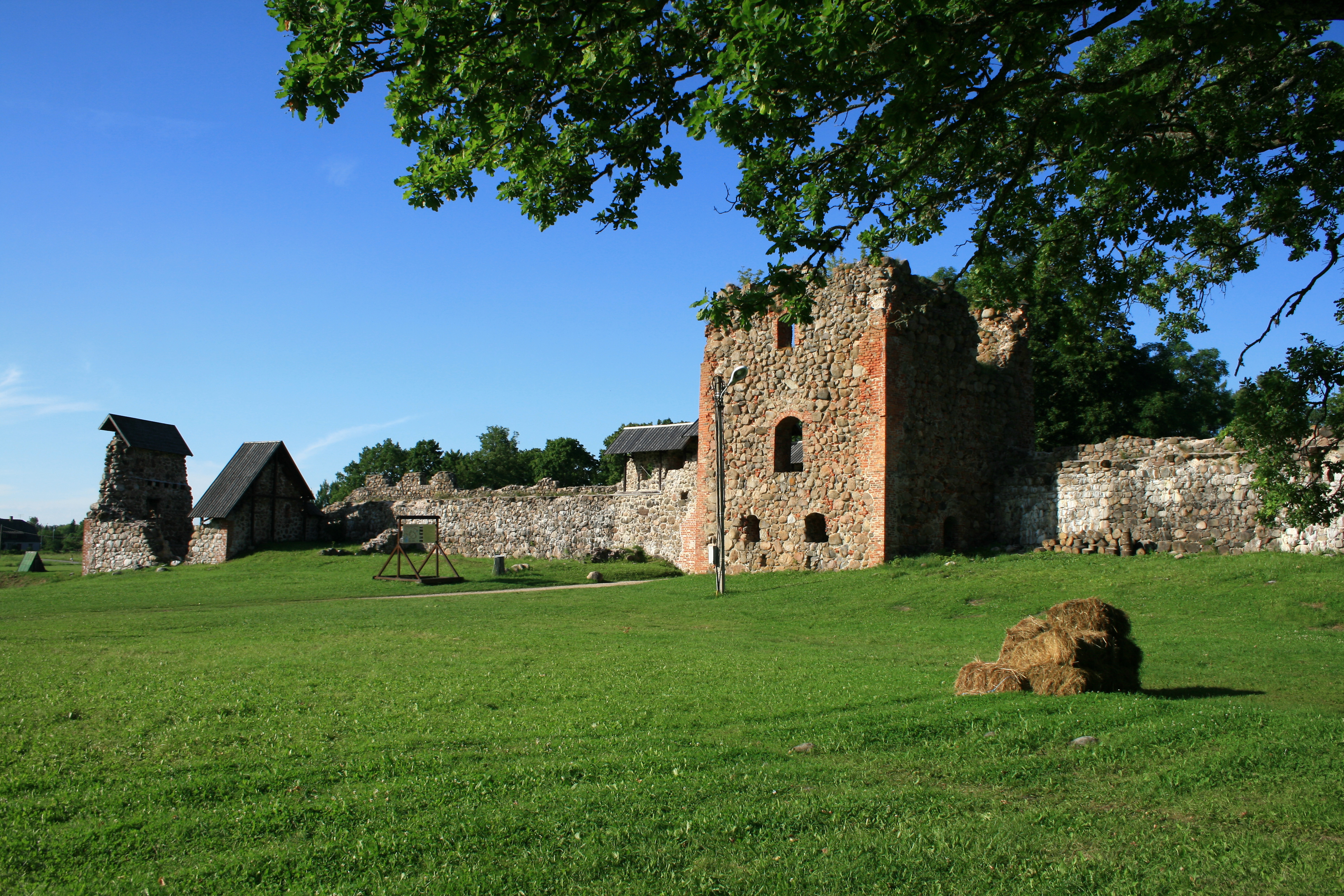
Karkus castle ruins

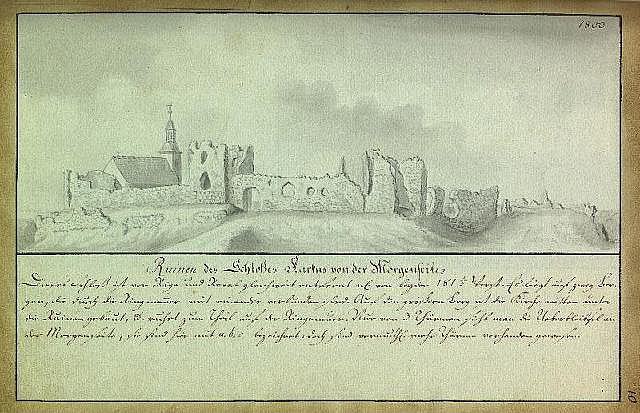
"Ruins of the Karkus castle in the morning", 1800, Johann Christoph Brotze's book Collection of various Liefländish monuments

The Ordensburg Karkus was built in the 13th century and destroyed in 1708. The castle is now a ruin.

== See also ==
- Battle of Karksi (1600)
