= Mulgi =

Mulgi may be:

- Mulgi, Estonia, a village in Mulgi Parish, Estonia
- Mulgi Parish, Estonia
- Mulgimaa, cultural-historical region in Estonia
- Mulgi dialect, a dialect of South Estonian spoken in Mulgimaa
- Mire language, an Afro-Asiatic language spoken in the southwestern Chadian
