= Karksi-Nuia =

Town in Estonia

- Town
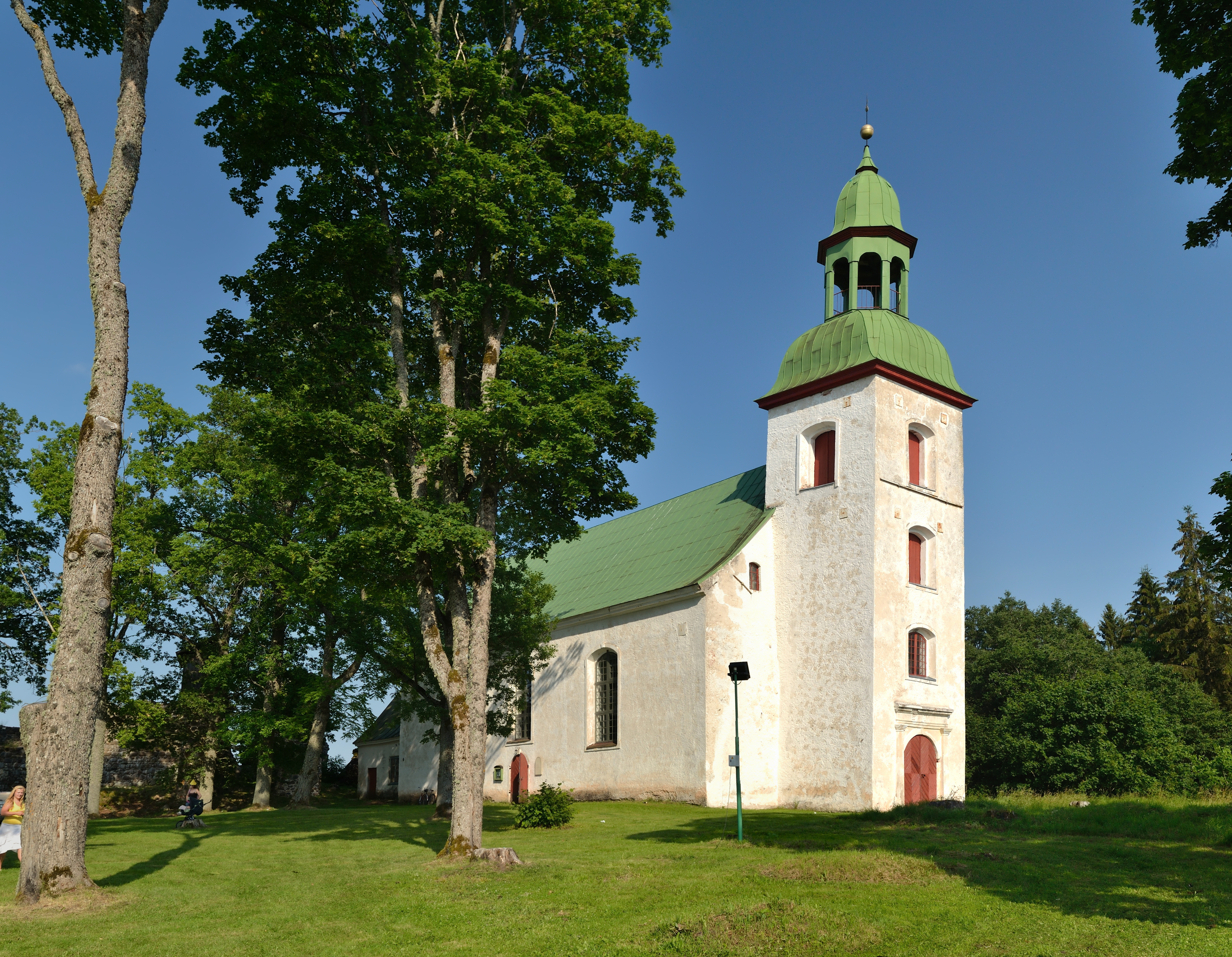
- Peter's Lutheran church

- Location in Estonia
- Coordinates: 58°06′17″N 25°32′51″E
- Country: Estonia
- County: Viljandi County
- Municipality: Mulgi Parish

Area
  - Total: 3 km^{2} (1.2 sq mi)
- Elevation: 112 m (367 ft)

Population (2026)
  - Total: 1,404
  - Density: 470/km^{2} (1,200/sq mi)
- Time zone: UTC+2 (EET)
  - Summer (DST): UTC+3 (EEST)

Karksi-Nuia (before 1987 Nuia; German: Karkus-Nuija) is a town in Mulgi Parish, Viljandi County, southern Estonia close to the Latvian border. The nearest villages are Univere to the west, Polli and Karksi to the north, and Kõvaküla to the south.

== History ==
Karksi was first mentioned in the 12th century as an administrative center.

=== Karksi Castle ===
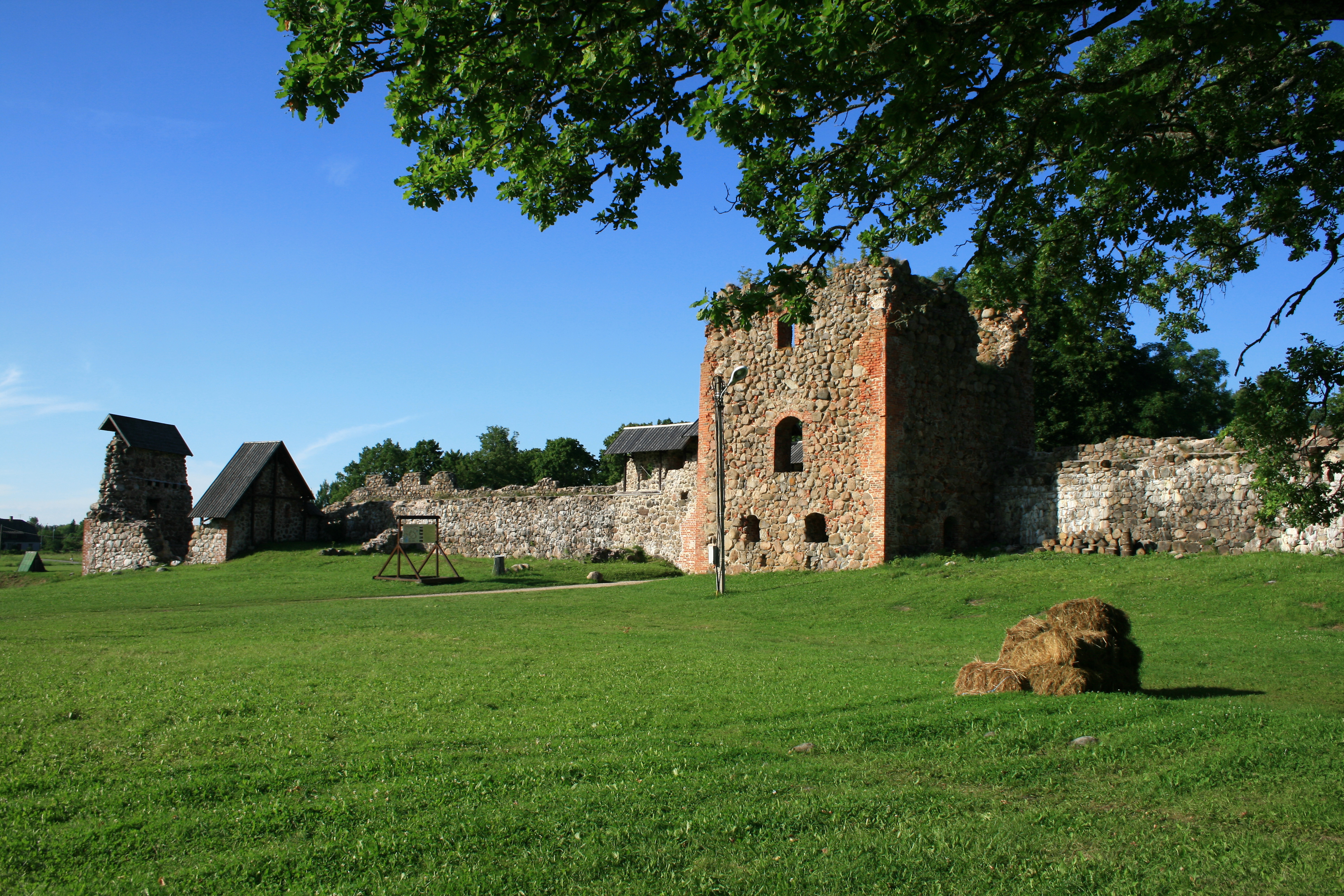
Karksi castle ruins

A vogt of Karksi is mentioned in written records for the first time in 1248, and construction of a castle in Karksi started sometime during the Middle Ages. Completion was however, delayed as the castle was destroyed several times during the period. When it was finally completed during the 14th century, it was for a time an important stronghold for the Teutonic Order in southern Estonia, and since 1470 the residence of the local commander. During the Great Northern War, the castle was destroyed and never rebuilt. Very little remains of the inner castle, which was separated from the outer ward by a moat, but the outer walls and two square towers are relatively well-preserved. The castle was built of rubble stone and brick. Today, the ruins are used as a backdrop for various cultural and sports events.

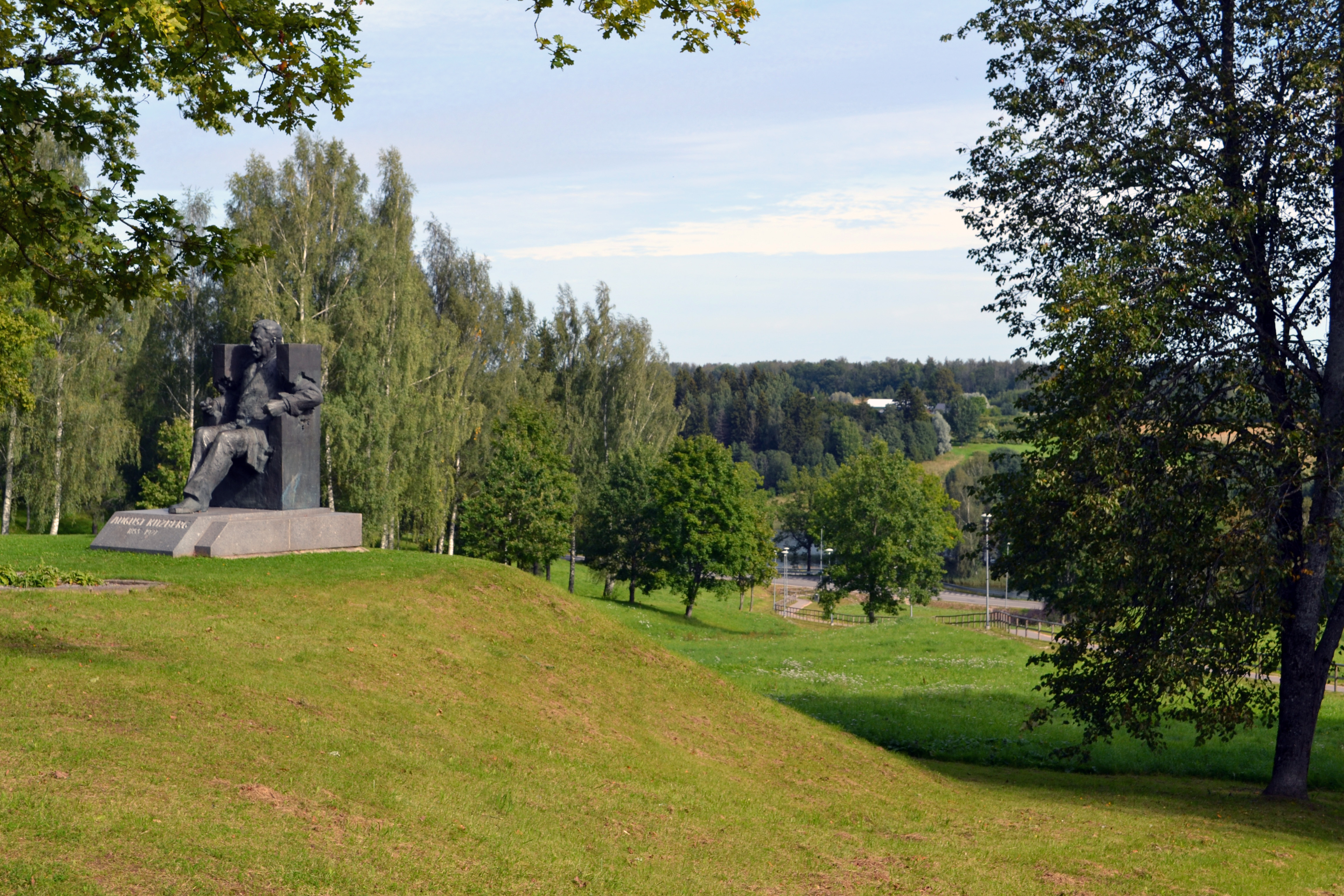
Monument to Estonian writer August Kitzberg in Karksi-Nuia

== Geography ==
Karksi-Nuia is situated in the southern part of Viljandi County. It has an area of 3 square kilometres (1.2 sq mi) and about 2100 inhabitants. It is part of the Karksi Parish, a municipality that consists of the town and the 20 villages around it. Karksi-Nuia is about 34 kilometres (21 miles) from Viljandi, 82 km (51 miles) from Pärnu, 99 km (62 miles) from Tartu and 193 km (120 miles) from Tallinn.

== Gallery ==
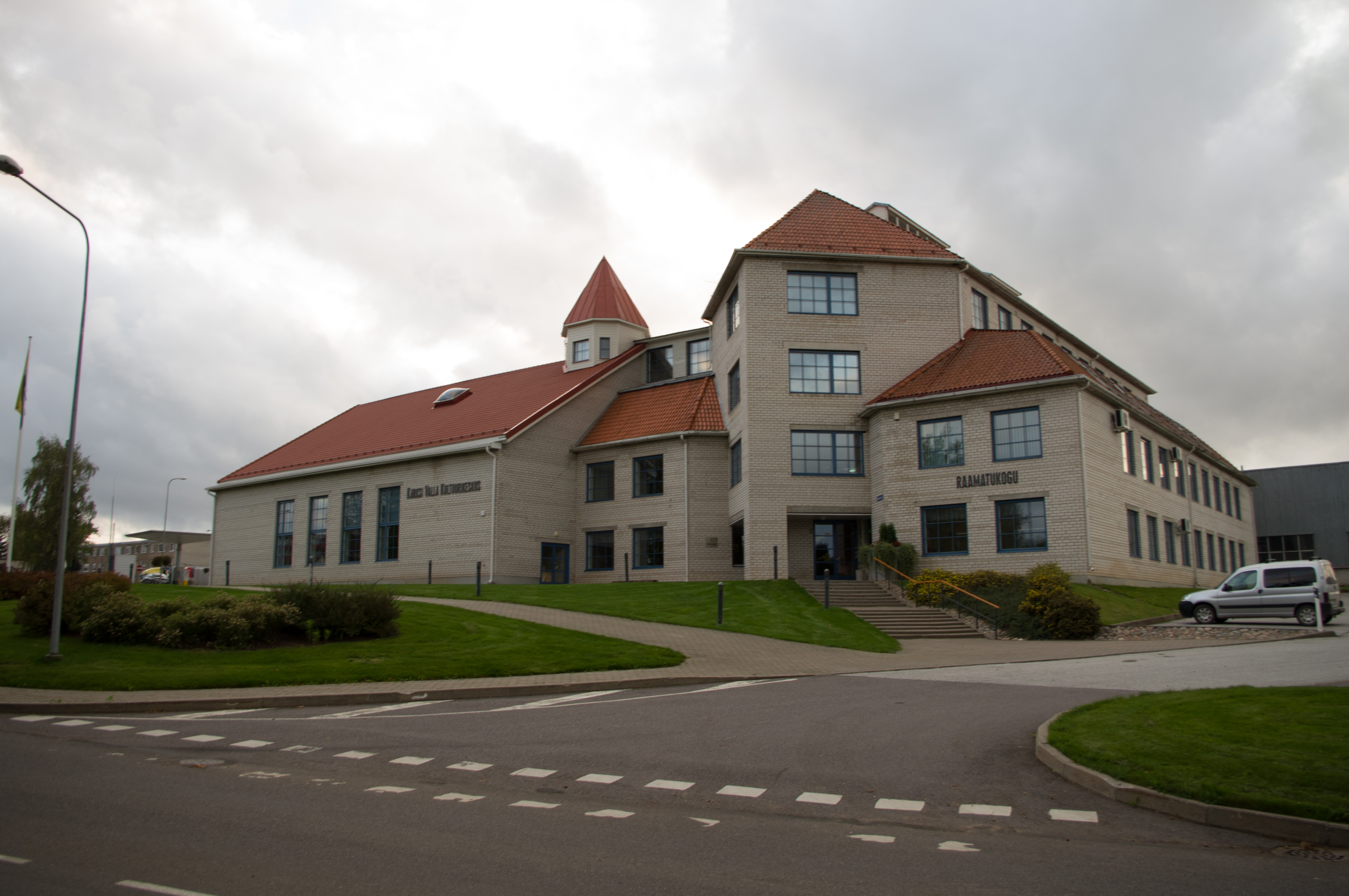
Karksi-Nuia cultural center and library

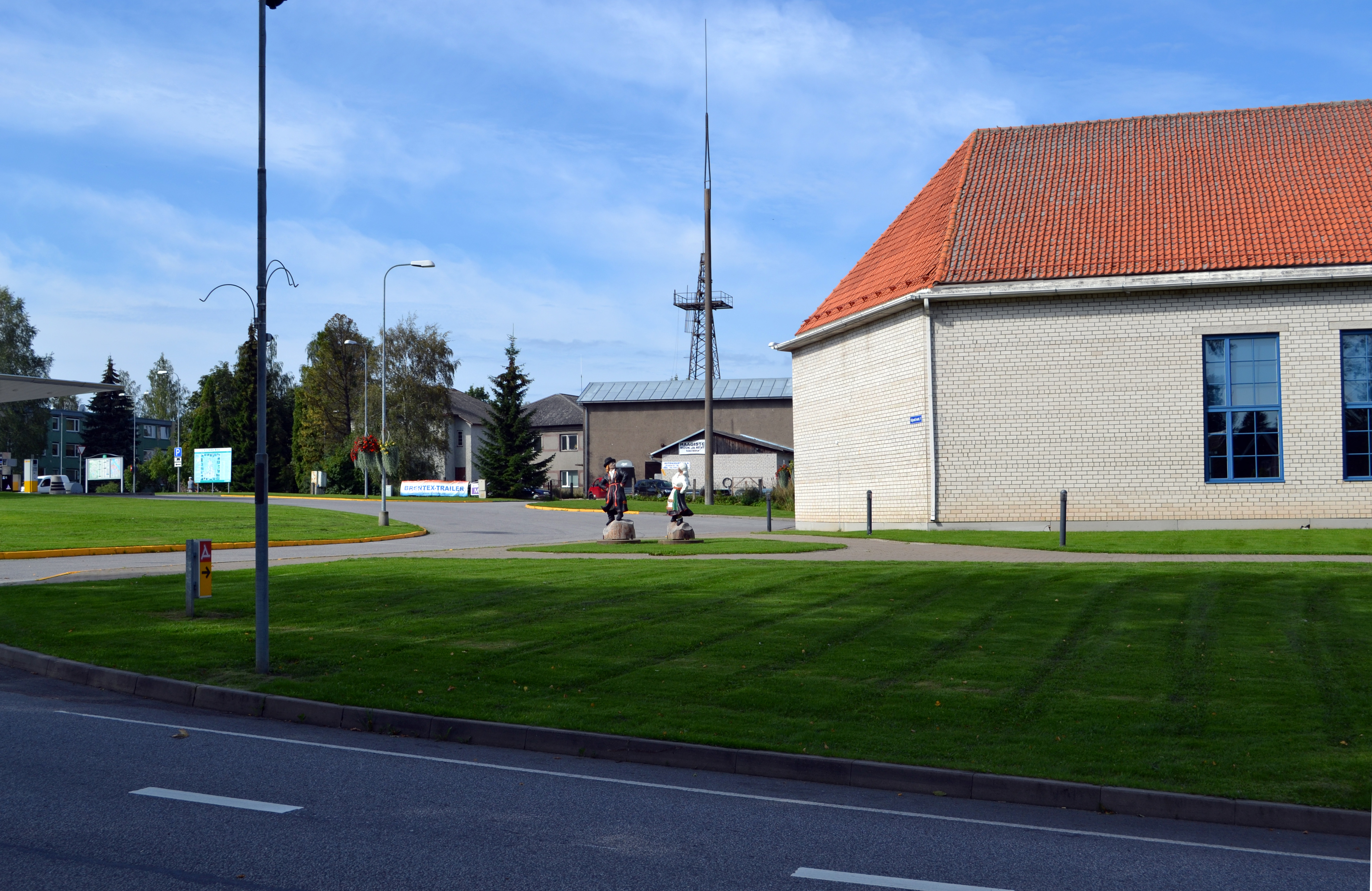
Town center

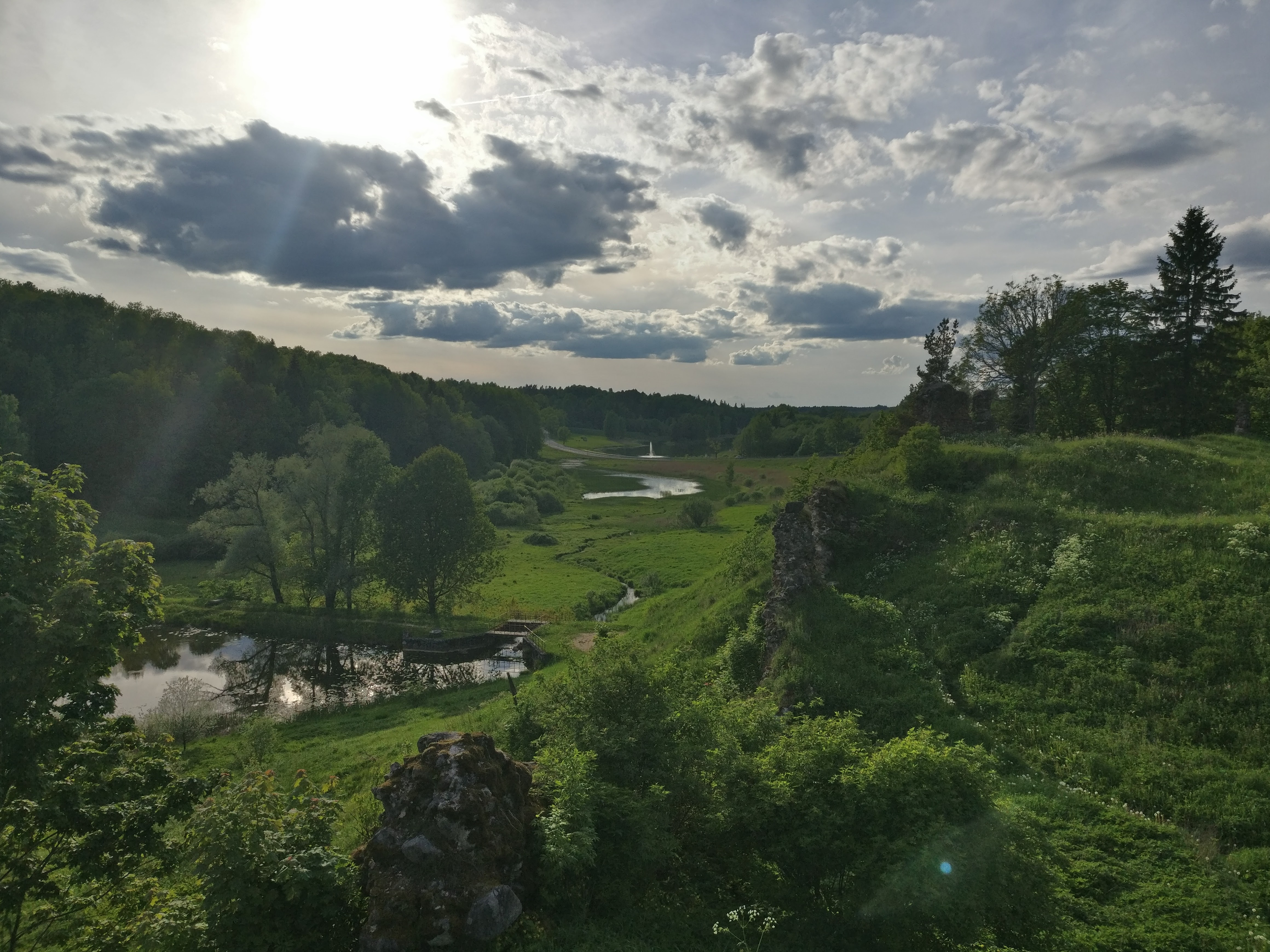
Karksi valley

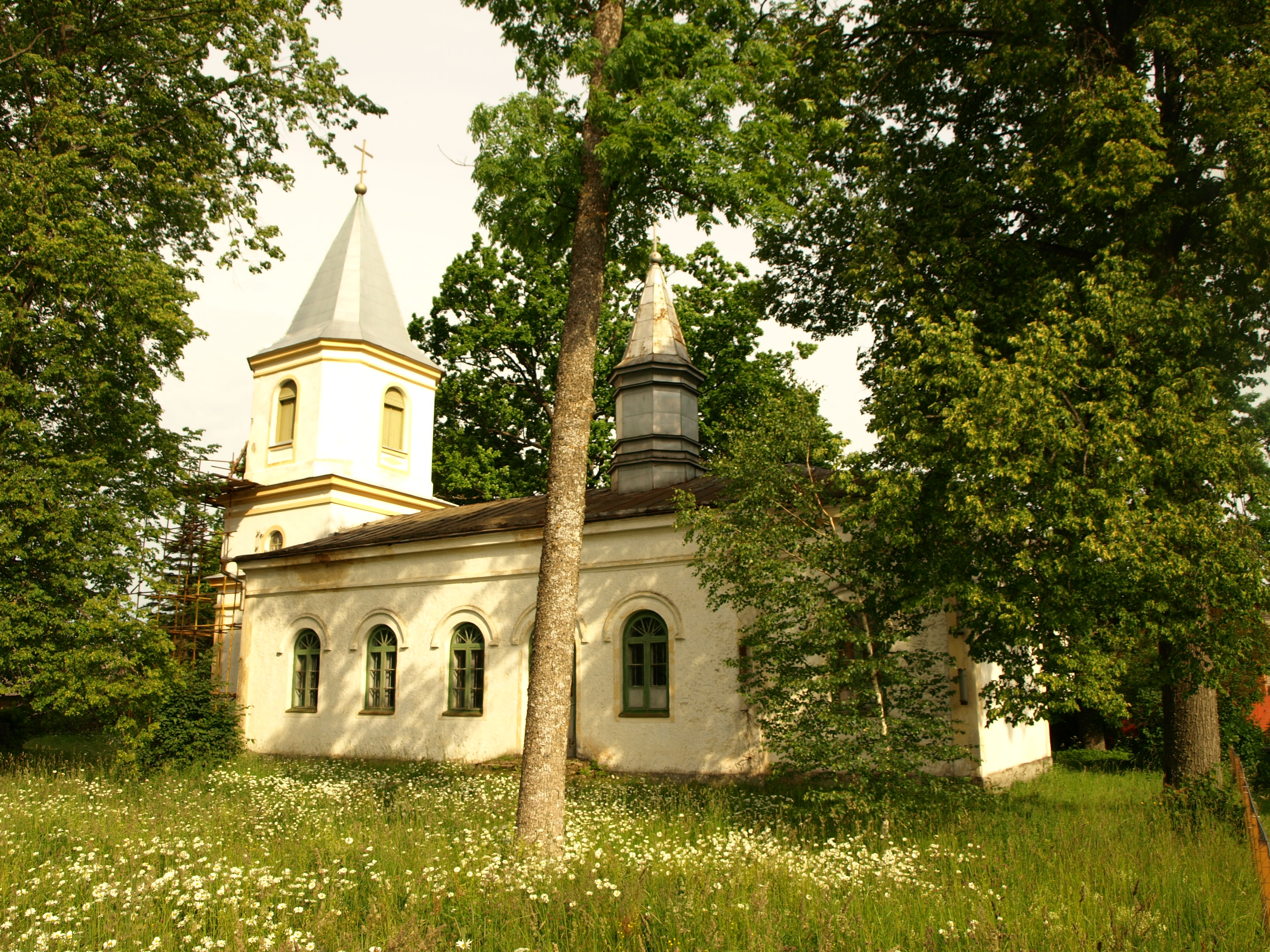
Saint Alexius Orthodox church

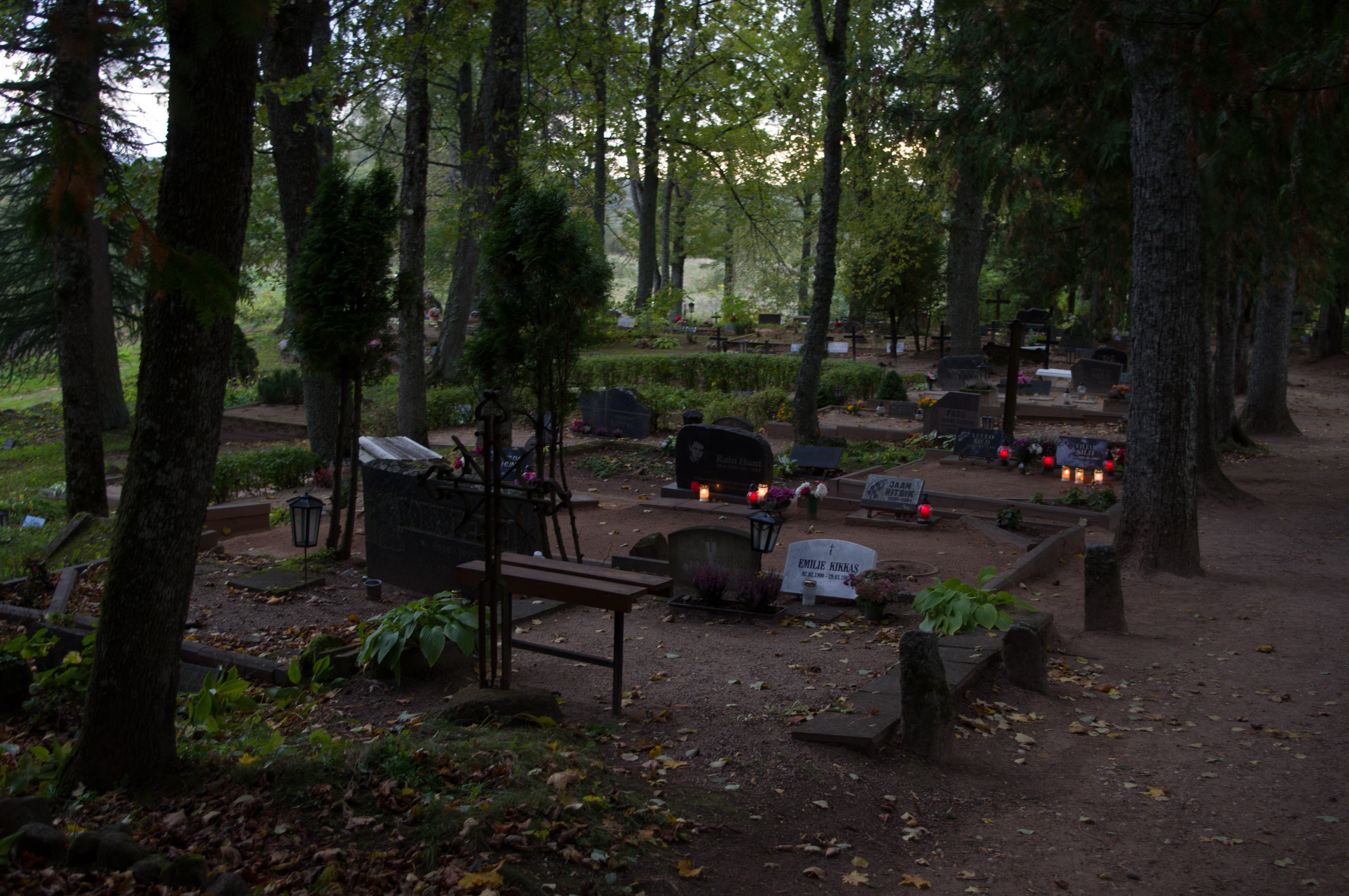
Karksi Rahumäe cemetery

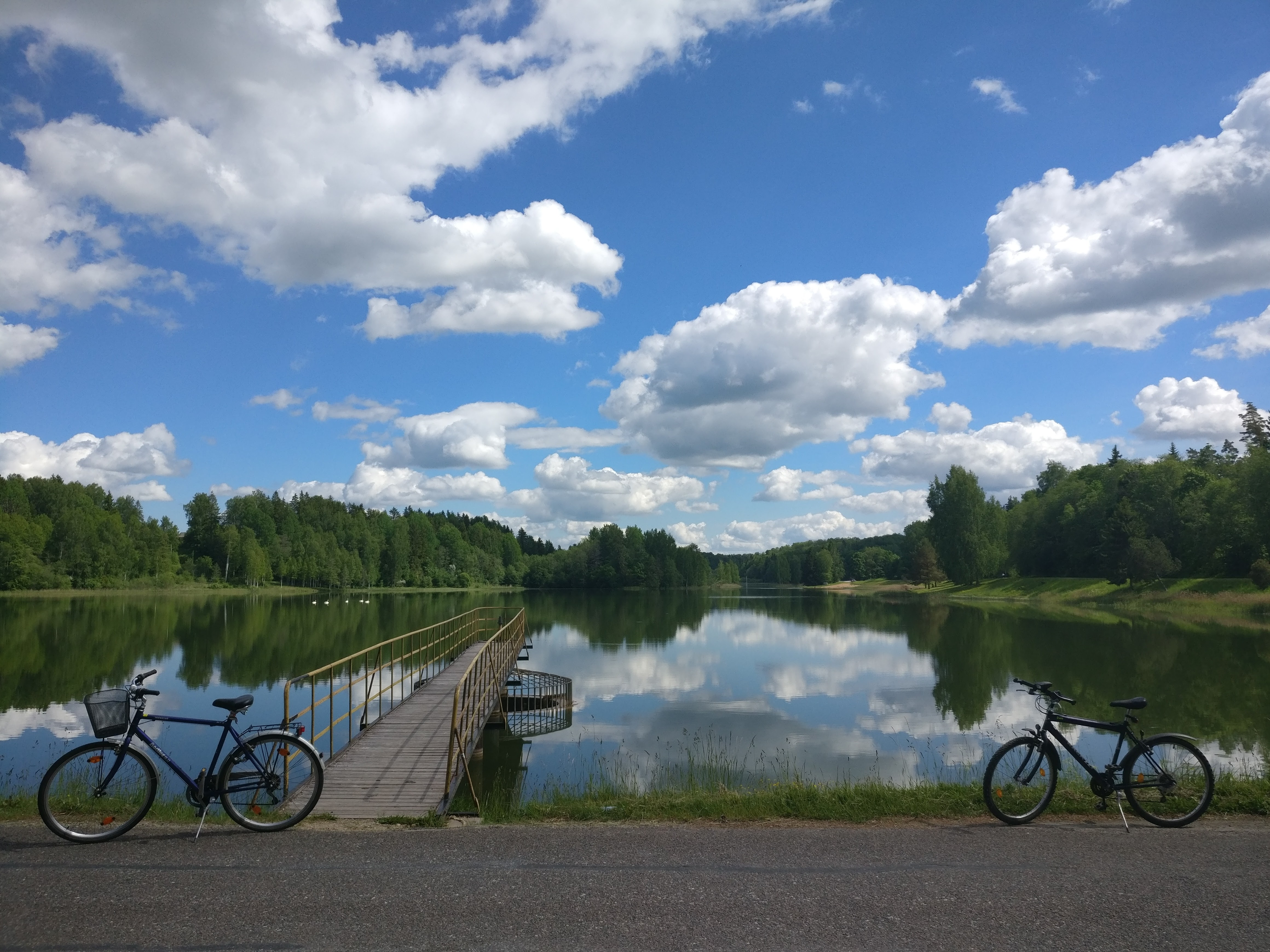
Karksi lake

== Notable people ==
- Kalle Jents (born 1957), politician, Mayor of Viljandi, 2007 to 2011
- Margus Pirksaar (born 1974), competitive runner
- Märt Israel (born 1983), discus thrower
- Margus Hunt (born 1987), former professional American football defensive end, world junior record holder in discus throw.

== See also ==
- Battle of Karksi (1600)
