= Allaste =

- Village
- Location in Estonia
- Coordinates: 58°08′N 25°31′E
- Country: Estonia
- County: Viljandi County
- Municipality: Mulgi Parish

Population (2011 Census)
  - Total: 25

Allaste (German: Alsten) is a village in Mulgi Parish in Viljandi County in southern Estonia. It borders the villages Pärsi, Polli, Leeli and Pöögle as well as other villages in the former Halliste Parish.
