= Raja, Viljandi County =

Village in Estonia

Raja
- Village
- Location in Estonia
- Coordinates: 58°09′20″N 25°27′28″E
- Country: Estonia
- County: Viljandi County
- Municipality: Mulgi Parish

Population (2011 Census)
  - Total: 28

Raja is a village in Mulgi Parish, Viljandi County in southern Estonia. It is located just east of Halliste, the former centre of the abolished Halliste Parish, and about 6 km (4 mi) northeast of Abja-Paluoja town. As of the 2011 census, the village's population was 28.
