= Pornuse =

Village in Estonia

- Village
- Location in Estonia
- Coordinates: 58°08′52″N 25°26′34″E
- Country: Estonia
- County: Viljandi County
- Municipality: Mulgi Parish

Population (2011 Census)
  - Total: 22

Pornuse is a village in Mulgi Parish, Viljandi County in southern Estonia. It is located just south of Halliste, the former centre of the abolished Halliste Parish, and about 5 km northeast of Abja-Paluoja town. As of the 2011 census, the village's population was 22.

Halliste Holy Anna Church and Halliste Primary School are located in the territory of Pornuse, on the northern side where neighbouring Halliste. The Halliste cemetery is near the church and the school (administratively in Kulla). The Halliste River passes Pornuse on its southern side.

Pornuse is the location of Pornuse (Alt-Bornhusen) and Kaubi (Uue-Pornuse, Neu-Bornhusen) manors. The first manor was established in 1542 and in 1678 it was divided. Politician and diplomat Friedrich Akel (1871–1941) was born in Kaubi Manor, which belonged to his parents.

== Gallery ==
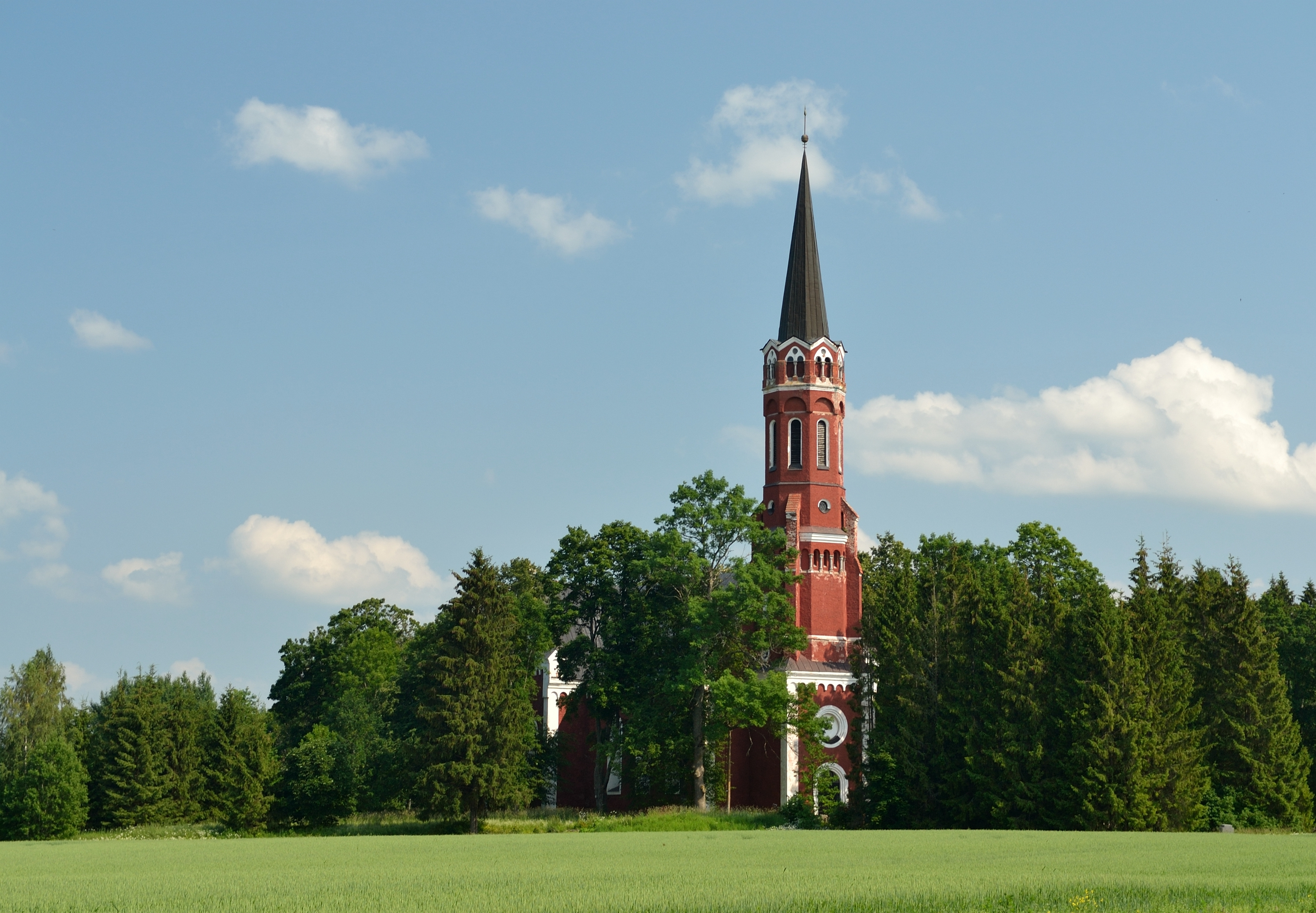
Halliste St. Anna Church

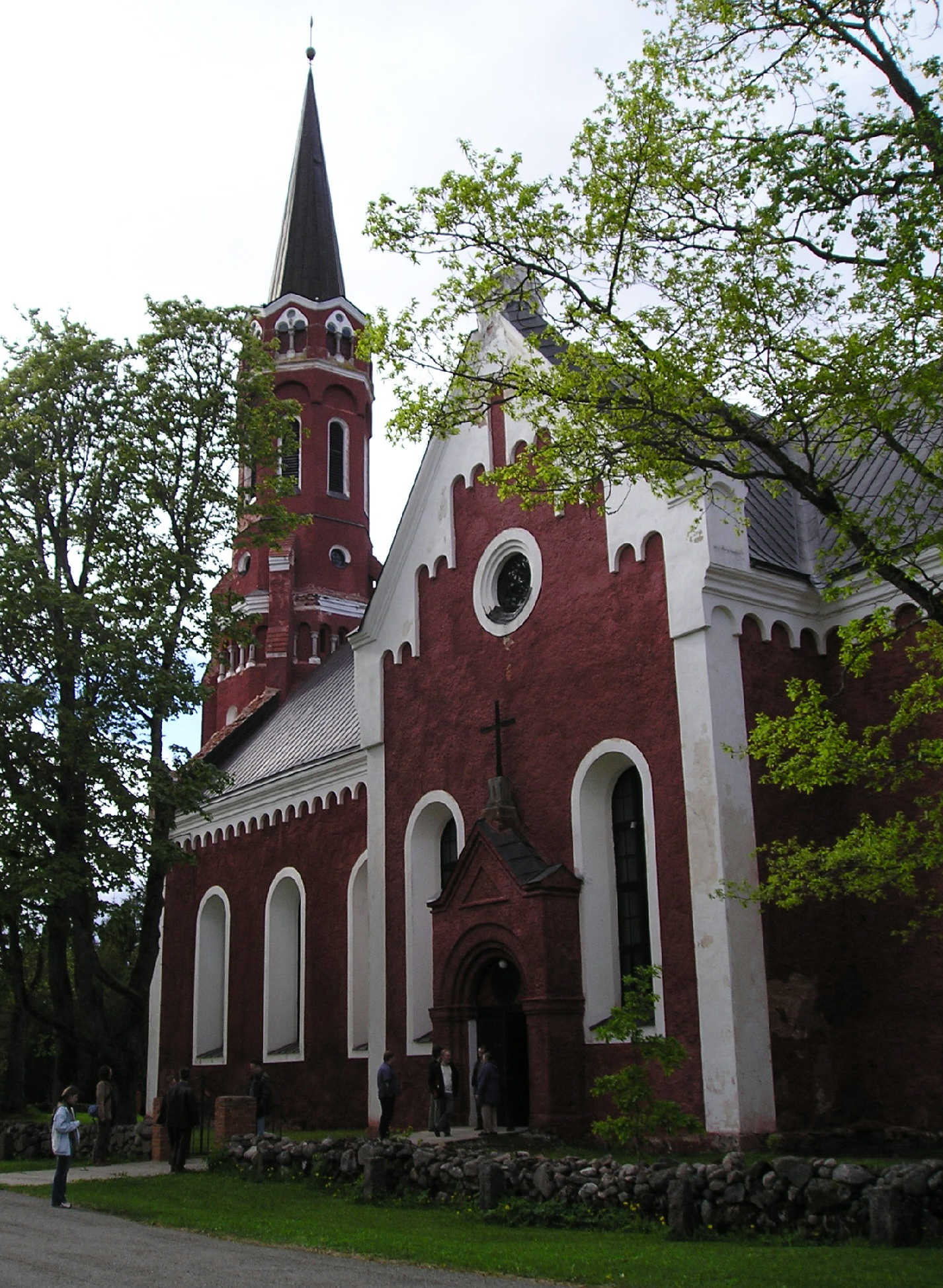
