= Pöögle =

Village in Estonia

- Village
- Location in Estonia
- Coordinates: 58°07′N 25°28′E
- Country: Estonia
- County: Viljandi County
- Municipality: Mulgi Parish

Population (2011 Census)
  - Total: 51
- Time zone: UTC+2 (EET)
  - Summer (DST): UTC+3 (EEST)

Pöögle is a village in Mulgi Parish in Viljandi County in southern Estonia. It borders the villages Leeli and Allaste as well as other villages in the former parishes of Abja and Halliste.
