= Abja-Vanamõisa =

- Village
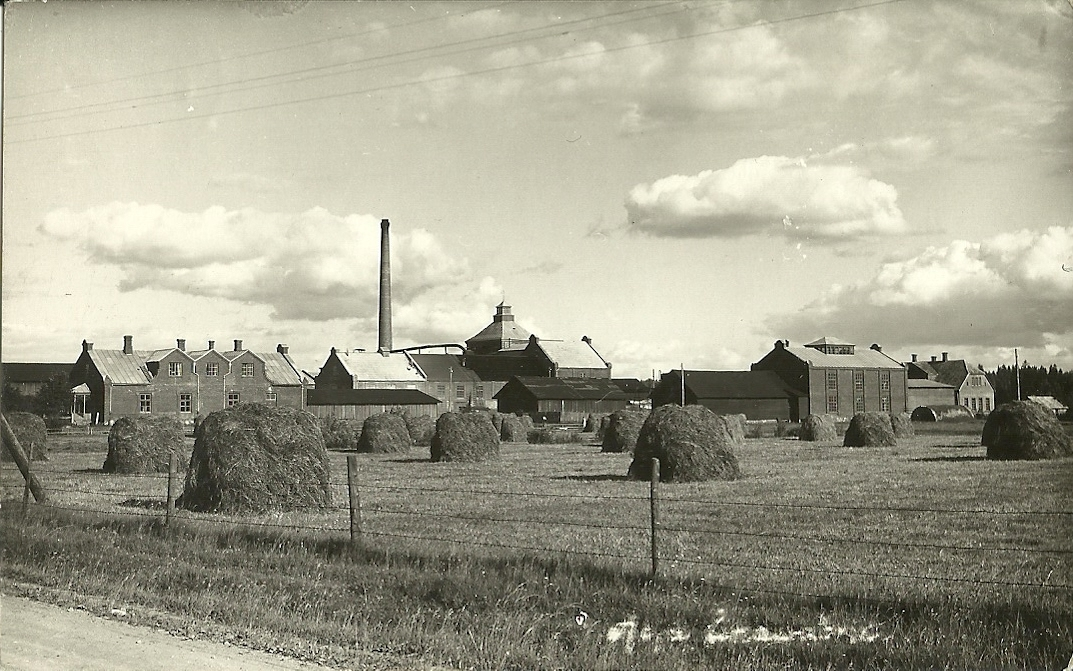
- The old Abja Flax Factory, c. 1920

- Location in Estonia
- Coordinates: 58°06′24″N 25°18′03″E
- Country: Estonia
- County: Viljandi County
- Municipality: Mulgi Parish
- First mentioned: 1583

Population (01.01.2012)
  - Total: 95

Abja-Vanamõisa (also known as Tümpsi) is a village in Mulgi Parish, Viljandi County, in southern Estonia. It's located about 4 km (2 mi) west of the town of Abja-Paluoja and 7 km east of Mõisaküla, between the Valga–Uulu (Valga–Pärnu) road (nr. 8) and the Estonia–Latvia border. Abja-Vanamõisa has a population of 95 (as of 1 January 2012). It was a part of Abja Parish before 2017.

The village was first mentioned in 1583 when the Livonian War was ending. In 1811 a manor known as Friedrichsheim was established in the village by detaching the lands from the nearby Abja Manor. It's known that a school operated in Vanamõisa already in 1838. In 1914 a flax factory which is considered to be the first in Estonia was established by engineer Mats Kissa (1887–1956) in Vanamõisa. The factory was closed in 1990.

Soviet admiral Johan Ludri (1895–1937) was born in Ärma farmstead in Abja-Vanamõisa.

Popular Estonian organic dairy products producer Pajumäe Farm is located in Abja-Vanaõisa.
