= Univere =

Village in Estonia

- Village
- Location in Estonia
- Coordinates: 58°06′N 25°32′E
- Country: Estonia
- County: Viljandi County
- Municipality: Mulgi Parish

Population (2011 Census)
  - Total: 41

Univere is a village in Mulgi Parish in Viljandi County in southern Estonia. It borders the villages Äriküla, Metsaküla, Leeli, Polli, Karksi-Nuia and Kõvaküla.
