= Pärsi =

Village in Estonia

- Village
- Location in Estonia
- Coordinates: 58°09′N 25°34′E
- Country: Estonia
- County: Viljandi County
- Municipality: Mulgi Parish

Population (2011 Census)
  - Total: 68
- Time zone: UTC+2 (EET)
  - Summer (DST): UTC+3 (EEST)

Pärsi is a village in Mulgi Parish, Viljandi County in southern Estonia. It borders the villages Morna, Oti, Karksi, Polli and Allaste as well as other villages in the former Halliste Parish.
