= Muri, Viljandi County =

Village in Estonia

Muri
- Village
- Location in Estonia
- Coordinates: 58.19134°N 25.62099°E
- Country: Estonia
- County: Viljandi County
- Municipality: Mulgi Parish

Population (2011 Census)
  - Total: 16
- Time zone: UTC+2 (EET)
  - Summer (DST): UTC+3 (EEST)

Muri is a village in Mulgi Parish in Viljandi County in southern Estonia. It borders the villages Suuga, Tuhalaane and Morna as well as other villages in the former parishes of Halliste and Paistu.
