= Halliste =

Borough in Estonia

- Small borough
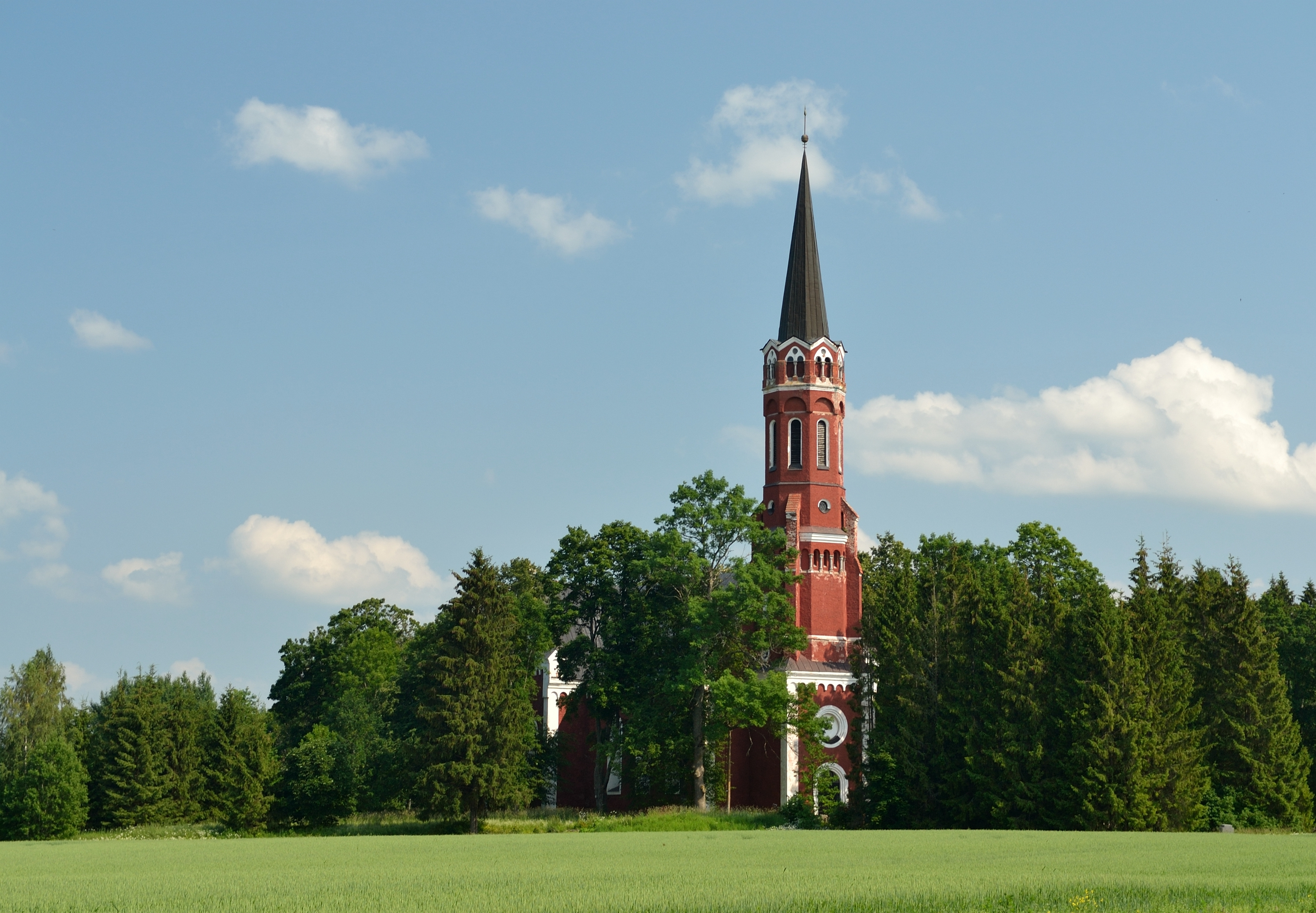
- Halliste Holy Anna Church

- Location in Estonia
- Coordinates: 58°09′52″N 25°26′23″E
- Country: Estonia
- County: Viljandi County
- Municipality: Mulgi Parish

Population (2011 Census)
  - Total: 329

Halliste (German: Hallist) is a small borough (Estonian: alevik) in Mulgi Parish, Viljandi County, in southern Estonia, located about 6 km northeast of the town of Abja-Paluoja. Until 2017, Halliste was the administrative centre of Halliste Parish. As of the 2011 census, the settlement's population was 329.

The Halliste Holy Anna Church and Halliste Primary School are located on the territory of the neighbouring Pornuse village, and Halliste cemetery in Kulla village. The Halliste River flows about 3 km south of Halliste.

== Gallery ==
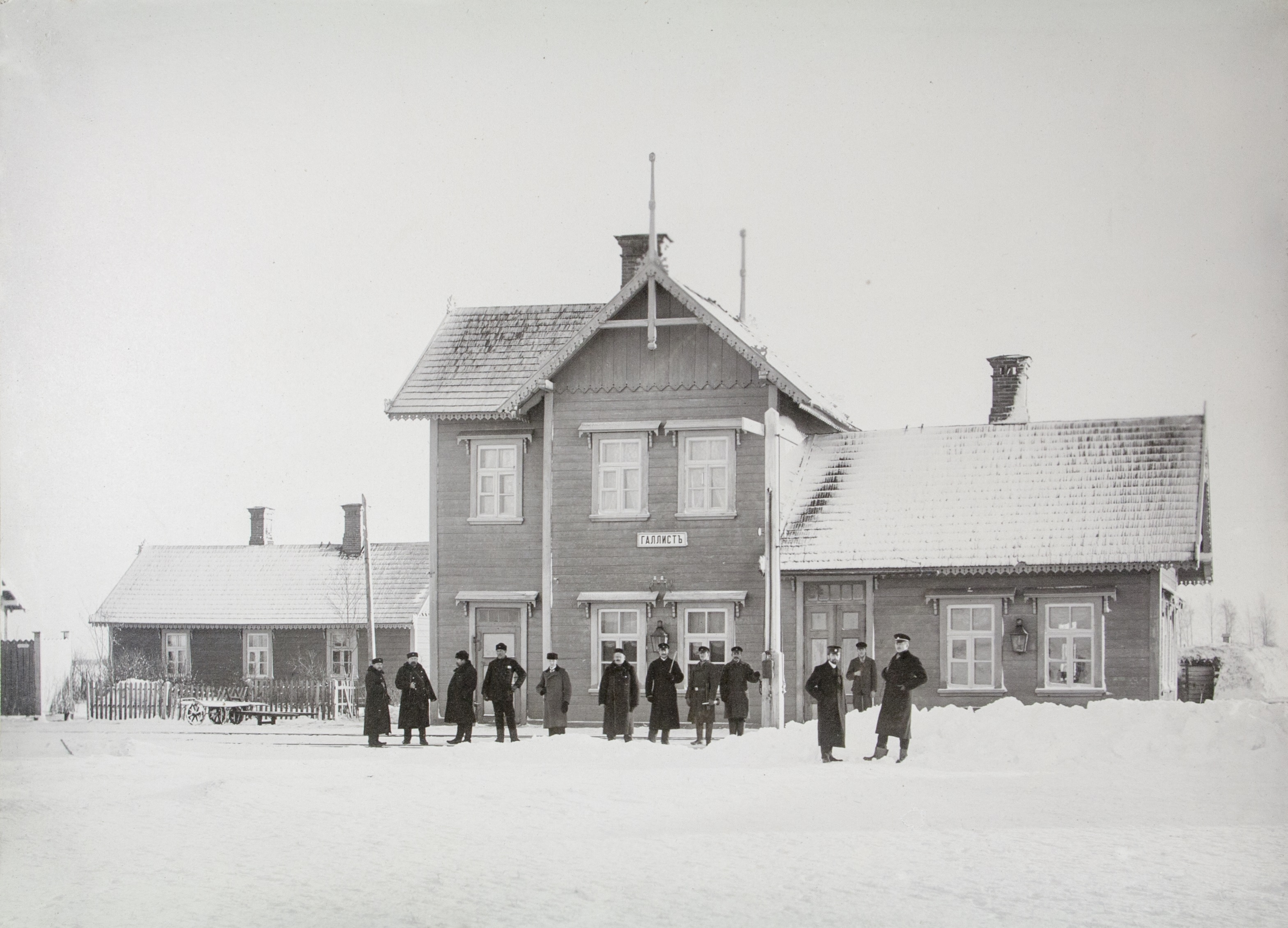
The old Halliste train depot c. 1910
