= Morna, Estonia =

Village in Estonia

Morna
- Village
- Location in Estonia
- Coordinates: 58°09′N 25°36′E
- Country: Estonia
- County: Viljandi County
- Municipality: Mulgi Parish

Population (2011 Census)
  - Total: 42
- Time zone: UTC+2 (EET)
  - Summer (DST): UTC+3 (EEST)

Morna is a village in Mulgi Parish in Viljandi County in southern Estonia. It borders the villages Muri, Tuhalaane, Hirmuküla, Oti and Pärsi as well as other villages in the former Halliste Parish.
