= Ereste =

Village in Estonia

- Village
- Location within Estonia
- Coordinates: 58.223611111111°N 25.476111111111°E
- Country: Estonia
- County: Viljandi County
- Parish: Mulgi Parish
- Time zone: UTC+2 (EET)
  - Summer (DST): UTC+3 (EEST)

Ereste is a village in Mulgi Parish, Viljandi County in Estonia. Before 2017, it was located in Halliste Parish.
