= Metsaküla, Viljandi County =

Village in Estonia

Metsaküla
- Village
- Location in Estonia
- Coordinates: 58°04′28″N 25°31′01″E
- Country: Estonia
- County: Viljandi County
- Municipality: Mulgi Parish

Population (2011 Census)
  - Total: 62
- Time zone: UTC+2 (EET)
  - Summer (DST): UTC+3 (EEST)

Metsaküla is a village in Mulgi Parish in Viljandi County in southern Estonia. It borders the villages of Lilli, Äriküla, Leeli and Univere as well as other villages in the former Abja Parish.
