= Kõvaküla =

Village in Estonia

- Village
- Location in Estonia
- Coordinates: 58°05′N 25°34′E
- Country: Estonia
- County: Viljandi County
- Municipality: Mulgi Parish

Population (2011 Census)
  - Total: 57
- Time zone: UTC+2 (EET)
  - Summer (DST): UTC+3 (EEST)

Kõvaküla is a village in Mulgi Parish in Viljandi County in southern Estonia. It borders the villages Ainja, Äriküla, Univere, Karksi-Nuia and Karksi.
