= Maru, Estonia =

Village in Estonia

Maru
- Village
- Location in Estonia
- Coordinates: 58°11′06″N 25°14′39″E
- Country: Estonia
- County: Viljandi County
- Municipality: Mulgi Parish

Population (01.01.2000)
  - Total: 7

Maru is a village in Mulgi Parish, Viljandi County, in southern Estonia. It has a population of 7 (as of 1 January 2000).
