= Päigiste =

Village in Estonia

- Village
- Location within Estonia
- Coordinates: 58.1436°N 25.3664°E
- Country: Estonia
- County: Viljandi County
- Parish: Mulgi Parish
- Time zone: UTC+2 (EET)
  - Summer (DST): UTC+3 (EEST)

Päigiste is a village in Mulgi Parish, Viljandi County in Estonia.
