= Päidre =

Village in Estonia

- Village
- Location in Estonia
- Coordinates: 58°15′17″N 25°31′19″E
- Country: Estonia
- County: Viljandi County
- Municipality: Mulgi Parish

Population (01.01.2000)
  - Total: 62

Päidre is a village in Mulgi Parish, Viljandi County, in southern Estonia. It has a population of 62 (as of 1 January 2000).
