= Niguli =

Village in Estonia

- Village
- Location within Estonia
- Coordinates: 58°12′59″N 25°21′31″E
- Country: Estonia
- County: Viljandi County
- Parish: Mulgi Parish
- Time zone: UTC+2 (EET)
  - Summer (DST): UTC+3 (EEST)

Niguli is a village in Mulgi Parish, Viljandi County in Estonia.
