= Oti, Viljandi County =

Village in Estonia

Oti
- Village
- Location in Estonia
- Coordinates: 58°08′28″N 25°35′24″E
- Country: Estonia
- County: Viljandi County
- Municipality: Mulgi Parish

Population (2011 Census)
  - Total: 21
- Time zone: UTC+2 (EET)
  - Summer (DST): UTC+3 (EEST)

Oti is a village in Mulgi Parish in Viljandi County in southern Estonia. It borders the villages Hirmuküla, Karksi, Pärsi and Morna.
