= 2017 Estonian municipal elections =

Municipal elections were held in Estonia on 15 October 2017, coinciding with an administrative reform which reduced the total number of municipalities from 213 to 79. The advance voting was held 5–11 October, during which 27.8% of voters cast their vote. During the advance voting, more people voted digitally than in any previous elections.

== Results ==
2017 Tallinn City Council election
← 2013	15 October 2017	2021 →
- All 79 seats to Tallinn City Council; 40 seats needed for a majority
- Turnout: 53.5%
Party	Leader	Vote %	Seats	+/–
Centre	Taavi Aas	44.4	40	−6
Reform	Kristen Michal	20.5	18	+9
SDE	Rainer Vakra	11	9	+1
EKRE	Martin Helme	7	6	+6
IRL	Raivo Aeg	6.6	5	−11
Electoral coalitions		7.4	1	0
This lists parties that won seats. See the complete results below.
Mayor of Tallinn before	Mayor of Tallinn after
Taavi Aas	Taavi Aas

=== Nationwide ===
Party	Votes	%	Seats
Estonian Centre Party	158,952	27.29	297
Estonian Reform Party	113,538	19.49	291
Social Democratic Party (Estonia)	60,299	10.35	151
Pro Patria and Res Publica Union	46,394	7.96	152
Conservative People's Party of Estonia	39,003	6.70	87
Estonian Greens	4,669	0.80	0
Estonian United Left Party	1,127	0.19	1
Citizens' elections coalitions and independents	158,560	27.22	750
Total	582,542	100.00	1,729
Valid votes	582,542	99.32	
Invalid/blank votes	3,977	0.68	
Total votes	586,519	100.00	
Registered voters/turnout	1,100,647	53.29	
Source: VVK

=== By municipality ===
Leading party by municipality: Centre Party Reform Party Social Democratic Party Pro Patria and Res Publica Union Citizens' elections coalitions/Independents

Municipalities	Centre	Ref	SDE	IRL	EKRE	Green	EÜVP	Ind.	Total
Alutaguse Parish	2	4	–	0	–	–	–	11	17
Anija Parish	5	3	–	0	–	–	–	11	19
Antsla Parish	1	–	–	–	–	–	–	16	17
Elva Parish	2	10	4	–	–	–	–	13	29
Häädemeeste Parish	2	–	–	0	1	–	–	16	19
Haapsalu	5	2	1	–	1	–	0	16	25
Haljala Parish	2	4	–	1	1	–	–	9	17
Harku Parish	1	6	1	7	2	–	–	4	21
Hiiumaa Parish	1	2	7	0	0	–	–	13	23
Järva Parish	1	5	1	3	3	–	–	8	21
Jõelähtme Parish	1	10	3	–	2	–	–	1	17
Jõgeva Parish	8	6	2	4	2	–	–	5	27
Jõhvi Parish	3	2	0	–	–	–	–	16	21
Kadrina Parish	1	–	–	1	–	–	–	17	19
Kambja Parish	0	12	2	–	1	–	–	6	21
Kanepi Parish	6	13	–	–	0	–	–	–	19
Kastre Parish	1	–	–	–	–	–	–	16	17
Kehtna Parish	3	–	3	0	3	–	–	12	21
Keila	1	12	2	0	–	–	–	4	19
Kihnu Parish	–	–	–	–	–	–	–	9	9
Kiili Parish	–	1	–	–	0	–	–	16	17
Kohila Parish	–	–	–	12	2	–	–	7	21
Kohtla-Järve	18	2	5	0	–	0	–	0	25
Kose Parish	0	–	3	–	–	–	–	16	19
Kuusalu Parish	1	1	–	–	2	–	–	15	19
Lääne-Harju Parish	0	4	–	0	0	–	–	17	21
Lääne-Nigula Parish	0	2	6	–	3	–	–	14	25
Lääneranna Parish	0	–	–	–	2	–	–	19	21
Loksa	13	–	–	2	–	–	–	–	15
Lüganuse Parish	6	3	–	–	–	–	–	10	19
Luunja Parish	0	–	–	4	–	–	–	11	15
Maardu	15	0	–	0	–	–	1	5	21
Märjamaa Parish	0	–	–	–	4	–	–	17	21
Muhu Parish	–	2	–	10	1	–	–	–	13
Mulgi Parish	8	3	0	7	0	–	–	3	21
Mustvee Parish	4	4	5	–	–	–	–	8	21
Narva	23	0	–	0	–	–	–	8	31
Narva-Jõesuu	7	–	–	–	–	–	–	10	17
Nõo Parish	0	0	–	7	–	–	–	8	15
Otepää Parish	3	5	–	0	0	–	–	9	17
Paide	5	3	4	6	2	–	–	3	23
Pärnu	7	9	1	9	6	–	–	7	39
Peipsiääre Parish	0	–	–	–	–	–	–	21	21
Põhja-Pärnumaa Parish	0	–	–	–	0	–	–	21	21
Põhja-Sakala Parish	0	3	–	–	0	–	–	18	21
Põltsamaa Parish	3	2	7	0	2	–	–	9	23
Põlva Parish	7	8	3	–	2	–	–	7	27
Raasiku Parish	–	–	–	0	–	–	–	17	17
Rae Parish	2	14	4	3	2	–	–	–	25
Rakvere	3	7	2	5	2	–	–	2	21
Rakvere Parish	1	–	1	3	1	–	–	13	19
Räpina Parish	3	7	3	–	3	–	–	5	21
Rapla Parish	2	5	0	1	5	–	–	14	27
Rõuge Parish	0	–	–	11	1	–	–	15	27
Ruhnu Parish	–	–	–	–	–	–	–	7	7
Saarde Parish	0	–	–	–	1	–	–	14	15
Saaremaa Parish	3	8	10	0	2	–	–	8	31
Saku Parish	0	5	–	–	1	–	–	13	19
Saue Parish	3	5	0	3	2	–	–	14	27
Setomaa Parish	1	–	–	–	–	–	–	14	15
Sillamäe	15	–	–	–	–	–	–	6	21
Tallinn	40	18	9	5	6	0	0	1	79
Tapa Parish	5	4	–	0	0	–	–	14	23
Tartu	7	20	8	3	6	–	–	5	49
Tartu Parish	0	0	3	–	–	–	–	22	25
Toila Parish	2	1	4	1	–	–	–	9	17
Tori Parish	5	–	–	–	1	–	–	17	23
Tõrva Parish	2	11	6	2	0	–	–	0	21
Türi Parish	1	3	7	10	2	–	–	0	23
Väike-Maarja Parish	3	7	–	1	0	–	–	8	19
Valga Parish	12	7	6	1	1	–	–	0	27
Viimsi Parish	2	9	2	3	2	–	0	3	21
Viljandi	2	8	9	6	2	–	–	0	27
Viljandi Parish	0	4	4	14	2	–	–	3	27
Vinni Parish	8	0	2	3	2	–	–	2	17
Viru-Nigula Parish	5	–	–	–	–	–	–	16	21
Vormsi Parish	0	–	–	–	–	–	–	9	9
Võru	3	3	11	3	1	–	–	0	21
Võru Parish	1	2	–	1	–	–	–	17	21
Total	297	291	151	152	87	0	1	750	1729
