= Toosi =

Village in Estonia

- Village
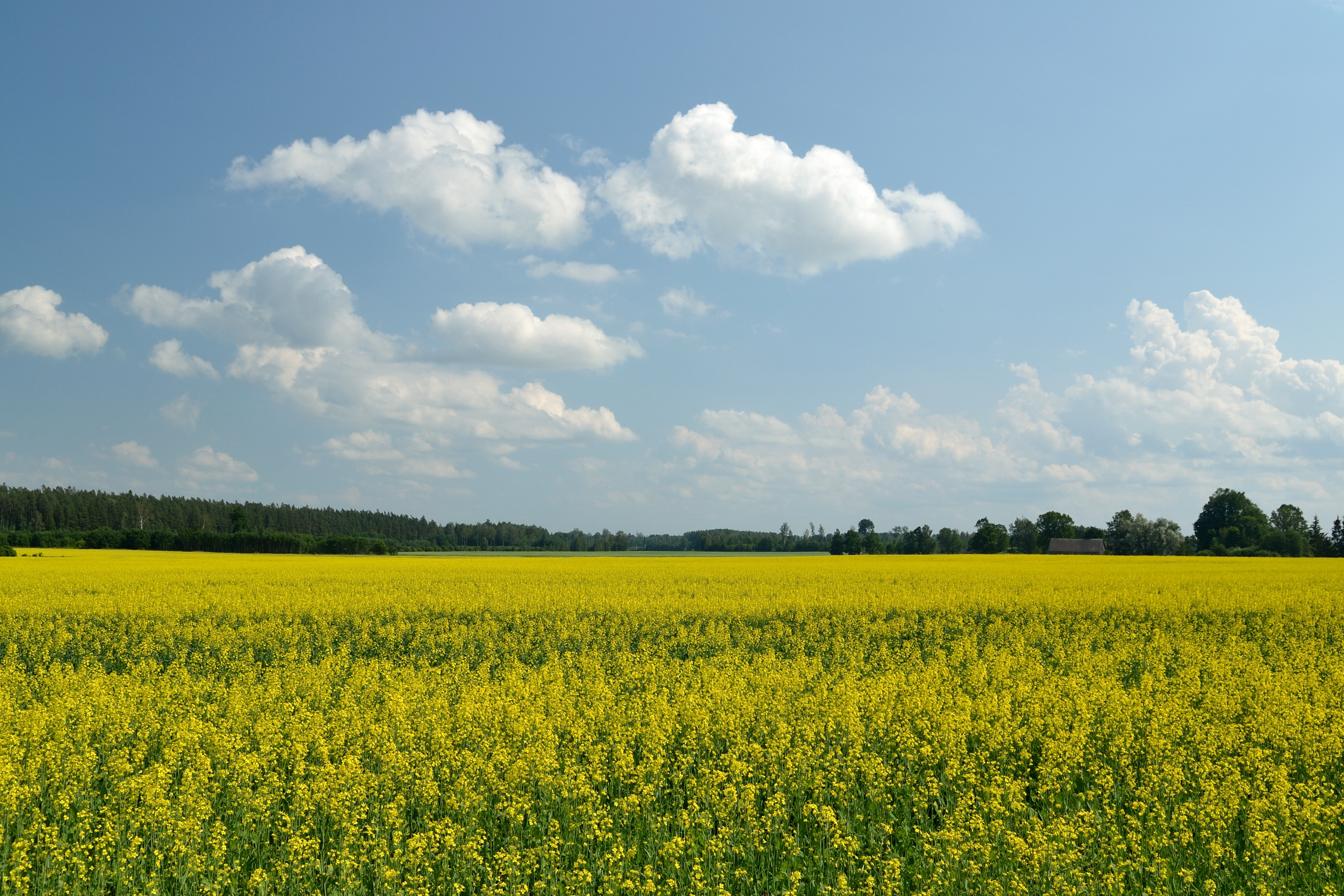
- Rapeseed field in Toosi

- Location within Estonia
- Coordinates: 58.173333333333°N 25.494722222222°E
- Country: Estonia
- County: Viljandi County
- Parish: Mulgi Parish
- Time zone: UTC+2 (EET)
  - Summer (DST): UTC+3 (EEST)

Toosi is a village in Mulgi Parish, Viljandi County in Estonia.
