= Naistevalla, Viljandi County =

Village in Estonia

- Village
- Location within Estonia
- Coordinates: 58.2836°N 25.3378°E
- Country: Estonia
- County: Viljandi County
- Parish: Mulgi Parish
- Time zone: UTC+2 (EET)
  - Summer (DST): UTC+3 (EEST)

Naistevalla (German: Naistewald) is a village in Mulgi Parish, Viljandi County in Estonia.
