= Battle of Karksi (1600) =

1600 military conflict in Estonia during Polish-Swedish War

- Part of the Polish–Swedish War (1600–1611)
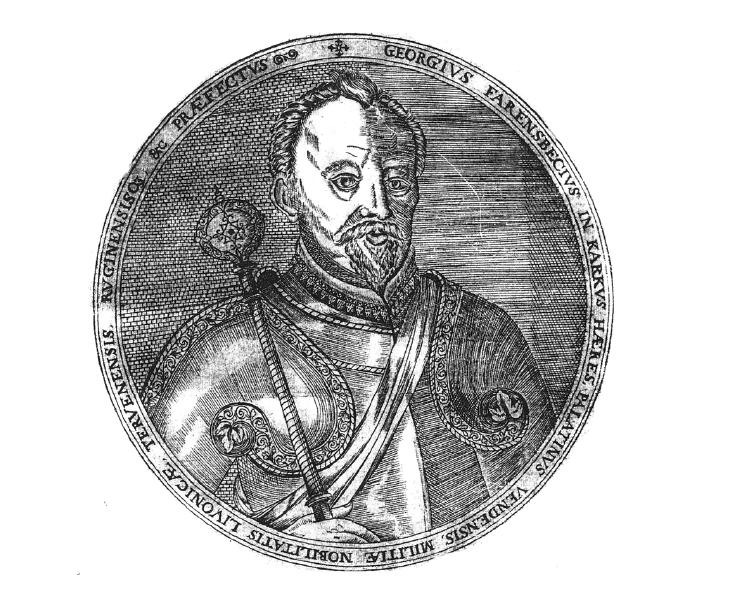
- Jürgen von Fahrensbach
Date	29 October 1600
Location	Karksi, in modern Estonia 58°07′02″N 25°35′16″E
Result	Polish–Lithuanian victory

Belligerents
Polish–Lithuanian Commonwealth	Sweden

Commanders and leaders
Jürgen von Farensbach	Carl Gyllenhielm

Strength
1,200	1,500

Casualties and losses
Very light	750 killed

The Battle of Karksi (also known as Battle of Karkus) was fought during the Polish–Swedish War (1600–1611) between the Polish–Lithuanian Commonwealth and the Kingdom of Sweden on 29 October 1600.

== History ==
Polish–Lithuanian Commonwealth forces under the command of Jürgen von Farensbach defeated the Swedish forces commanded by Carl Gyllenhielm. Before the battle, Pärnu was besieged on 17 September and after heavy bombardment it surrendered on 17 October. Then the Swedish army moved for Fellin (Viljandi), shielded from the south by a force of 1,500. On the night of 29/30 October the shielding force was caught and destroyed near Karkus by Farensbach, voivode of Wenden, with 1,200 horses.
