= Mulgi Parish =

Municipality of Estonia

Mulgi Parish Mulgi vald
- Municipality of Estonia
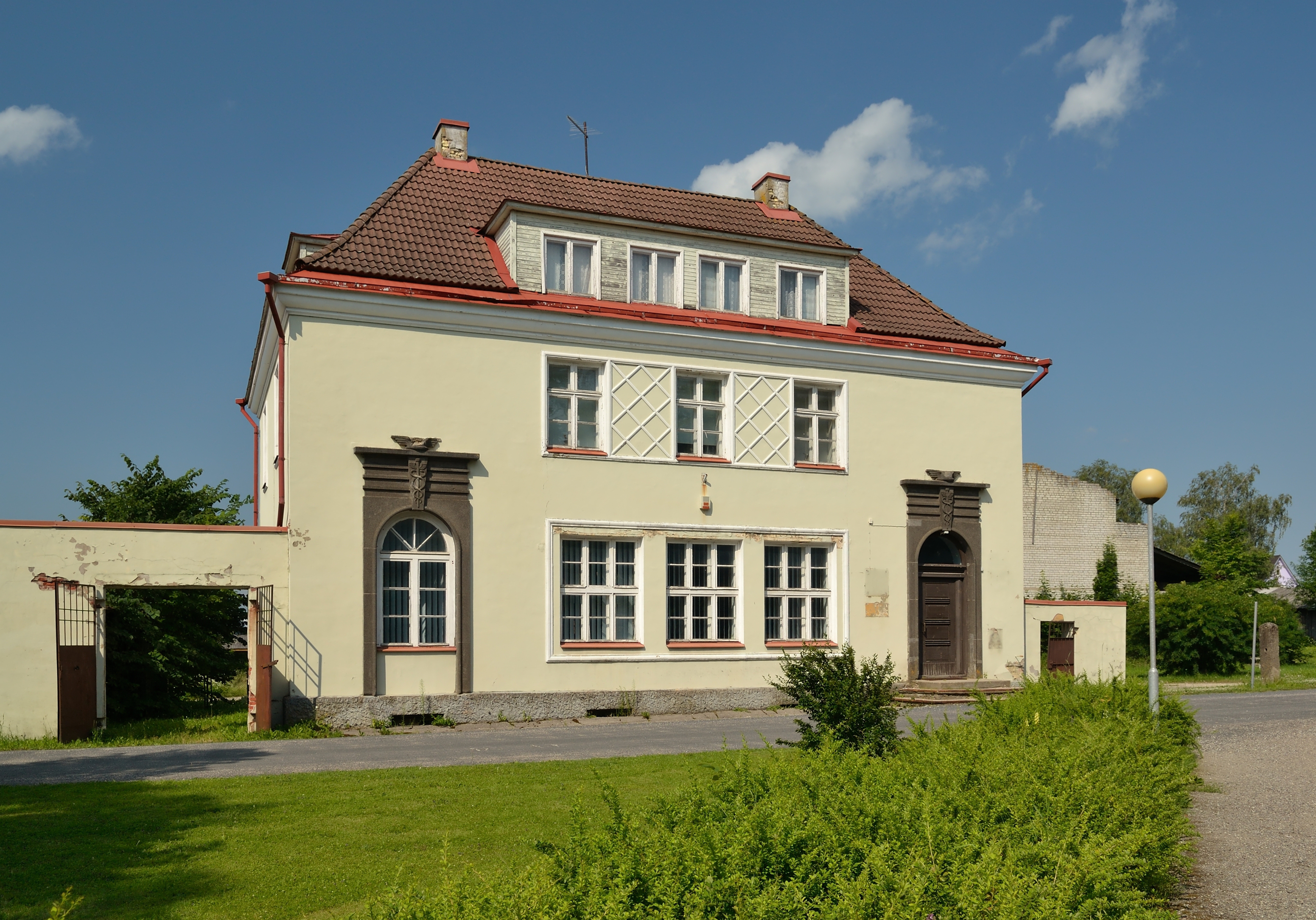
- Abja-Paluoja post office

- Flag Coat of arms

- Mulgi Parish within Viljandi County.
- Country: Estonia
- County: Viljandi County
- Administrative centre: Abja-Paluoja

Government
  - Mayor: Imre Jugomäe

Area
  - Total: 881 km^{2} (340 sq mi)

Population (2019)
  - Total: 7,436
  - Density: 8.44/km^{2} (21.9/sq mi)
- ISO 3166 code: EE-480

Mulgi Parish (Estonian: Mulgi vald) is a rural municipality in southern Estonia. It is a part of Viljandi County. As of 2021, the municipality has a population of 7,372, and covers 881 km^{2} (340 sq mi).

== Demography ==
The administrative centre of the Mulgi municipality is the town of Abja-Paluoja. The municipality itself consists of 3 towns (Abja-Paluoja, Karksi-Nuia, Mõisaküla); 2 small boroughs (Estonian: alevikud) (Halliste, Õisu); and 58 villages: Abja-Vanamõisa, Abjaku, Ainja, Allaste, Äriküla, Atika, Ereste, Hirmuküla, Hõbemäe, Kaarli, Kalvre, Kamara, Karksi, Kõvaküla, Kulla, Laatre, Lasari, Leeli, Lilli, Mäeküla, Maru, Metsaküla, Mõõnaste, Morna, Mulgi, Muri, Naistevalla, Niguli, Oti, Päidre, Päigiste, Pärsi, Penuja, Põlde, Polli, Pöögle, Pornuse, Räägu, Raamatu, Raja, Rimmu, Saate, Saksaküla, Sammaste, Sarja, Sudiste, Suuga, Tilla, Toosi, Tuhalaane, Ülemõisa, Umbsoo, Univere, Uue-Kariste, Vabamatsi, Vana-Kariste, Veelikse, and Veskimäe.

The most common religions are Lutheranism and Orthodoxy, although most of the municipality's adult residents are unaffiliated.

== History ==
The municipality was formed on 24 October 2017, by merging of the town of Mõisaküla with the rural municipalities of Karksi, Abja, and Halliste.

There were many discrepancies in the past based on the naming of the Mulgi municipality; the naming council found Mulgi to be a misleading name both culturally and geographically, as the municipality only covers a third of the historical Mulgimaa – the municipalities of Halliste and Karks, to be more specific. Suggested names in its place included Lääne-Mulgi, Abja-Mulgi, and Halliste-Karksi.

Concerns have also been raised about the loss of the name Abja. This stems from the history of the area; before the expansion of the Viljandi county (Raion) borders in 1962, the raion of Abja also existed in about the same area.

The area has been a developed flax growing region and was one of the most prosperous in Estonia in the 19th century. Flax cultivation is also the reason why flax flowers are depicted on regional symbols.

== Notable people ==
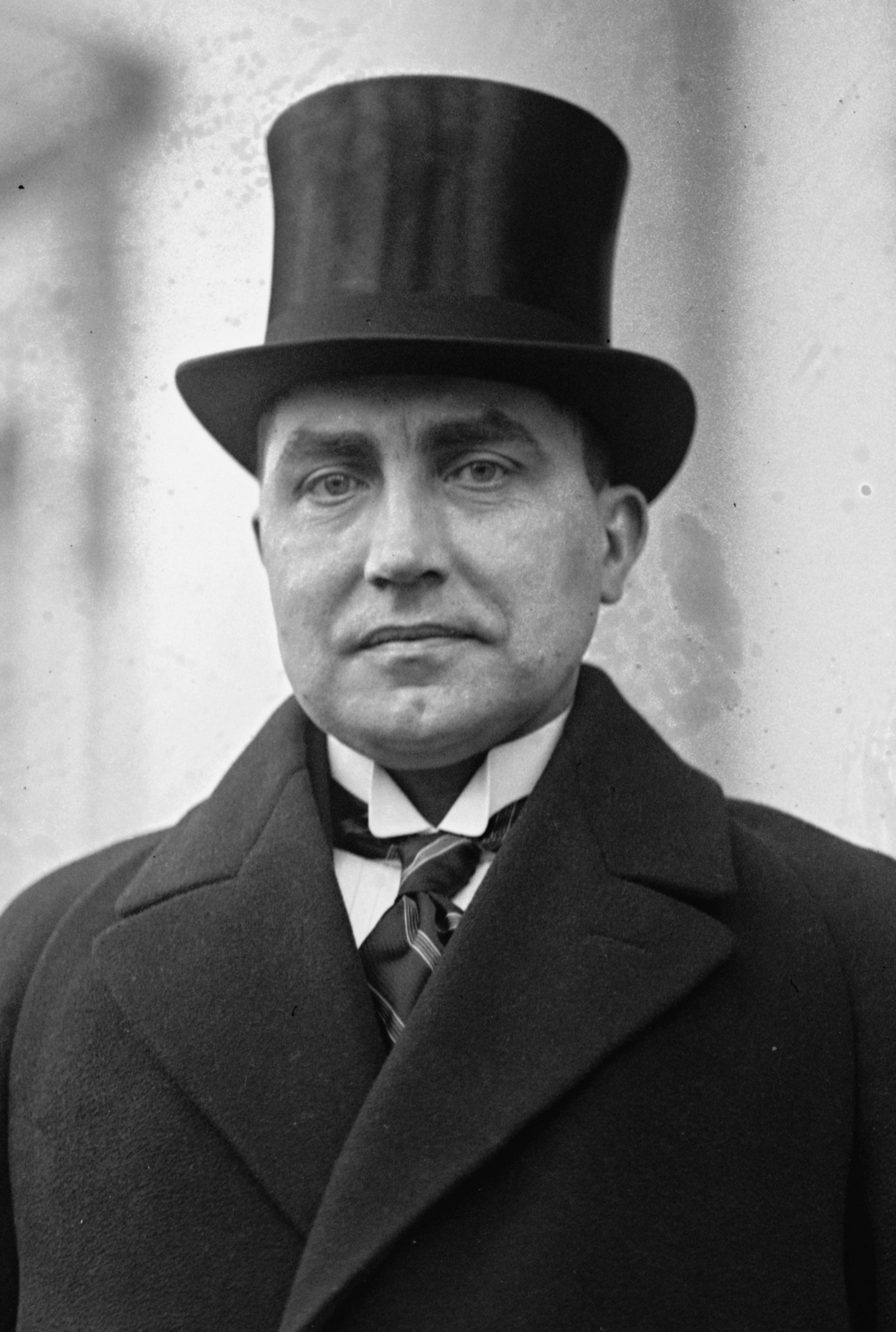
Ants Piip, 1923

- Friedrich Akel (1871 in Pornuse – 1941), diplomat and politician, State Elder of Estonia in 1924.
- Hans Rebane (1882 in Veskimäe – 1961), politician, diplomat and journalist; Minister of Foreign Affairs, 1927 to 1928
- Jaan Hünerson (1882 - 1942), agronomist and politician, Minister of Education and Social Affairs, 1929–1931 & 1932
- Ants Piip (1884 in Tuhalaane – 1942), lawyer, diplomat and politician, the 1st Head of State of Estonia, 1920 to 1921 and 5th Prime Minister of Estonia, 1920.
- Heinrich Laretei (1892 in Õisu – 1973), politician, diplomat and soldier, Minister of the Interior, 1926
- Hendrik Saar (1893 in Laatre – 1944), journalist, caricaturist, playwright and clown.
- Arnold Luhaäär (1905 in Mõisaküla – 1965), heavyweight weightlifter, silver and bronze medallist at the 1928 and 1936 Olympic Games
- Jaan Kiivit Sr. (1906 in Tuhalaane – 1971), prelate, Archbishop of Tallinn, 1949 to 1967
- Adalberts Bubenko (1910 in Mõisaküla – 1983), Latvian athlete, bronze medallist in the 50 kilometre walk at the 1936 Summer Olympics
- Ilmar Mändmets (1944 in Mõisaküla – 2015), agronomist and politician; Minister of Agriculture, 1995–1997
- Rita Raave (born 1951 in Mõisaküla), stage, TV and film actress, and painter.
