= Mõisaküla =

Town in Estonia

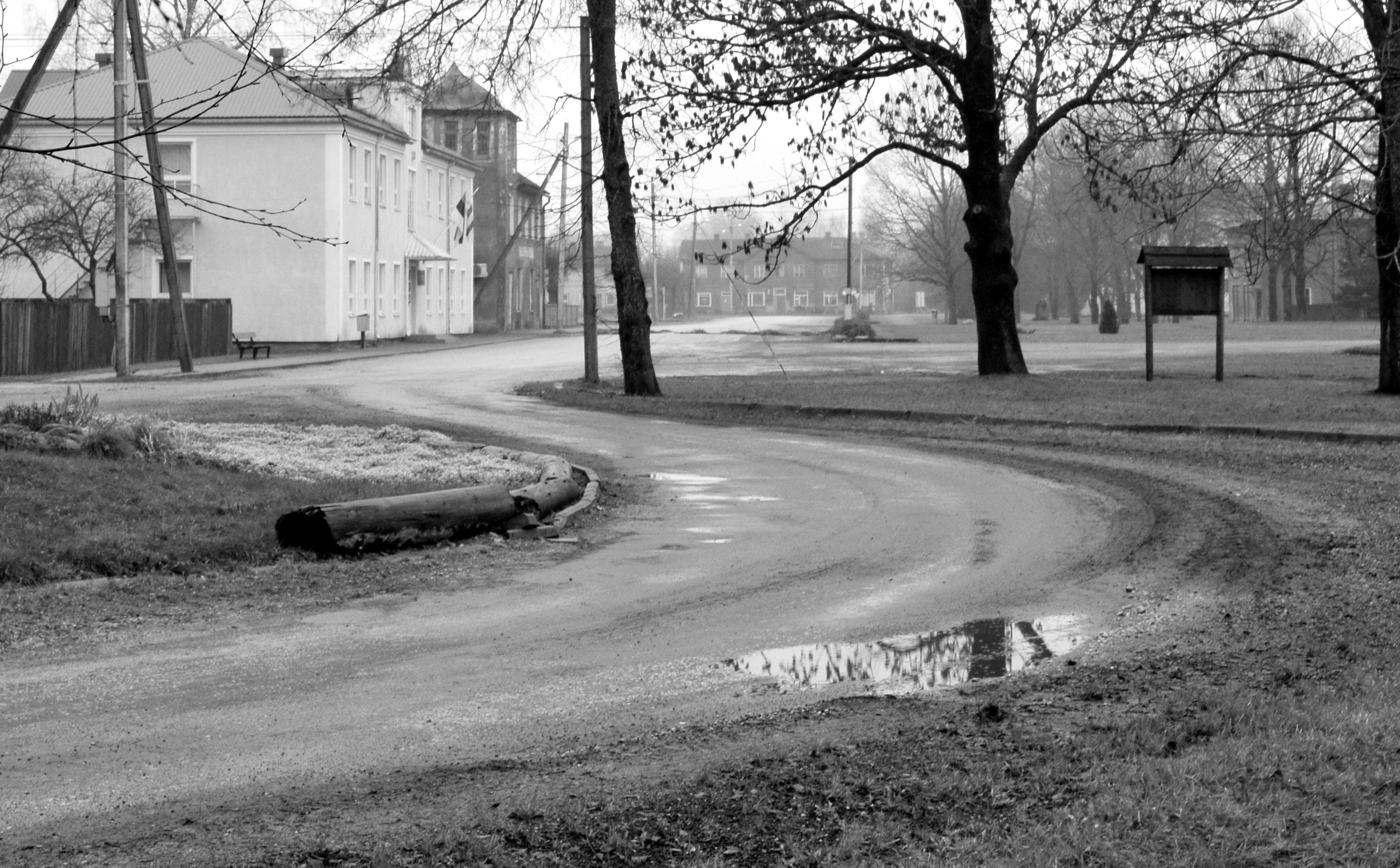

- Location within Estonia Location within Baltic Sea Location within Europe
- Coordinates: 58°05′N 25°11′E
- Country: Estonia
- County: Viljandi County
- County: Mulgi Parish

Area
  - Total: 2.2 km^{2} (0.85 sq mi)

Population (2026)
  - Total: 693
  - Rank: 46th
- Time zone: UTC+2 (EET)
  - Summer (DST): UTC+3 (EEST)

Mõisaküla (Latvian: Muižciems; Meizakila; German: Moiseküll) is a town in southern Estonia, part of Mulgi Parish of Viljandi County, just next to the border of Latvia.

The town has 32 streets, with the total length of 15,5 km. There are 401 dwellings in Mõisaküla, consisting mainly of small 1- or 2-floor houses.

The closest regional centres are Viljandi (49 km away) and Pärnu (63 km). It is 189 km from the capital city, Tallinn, and 125 km from the second largest city, Tartu.

== History ==
Mõisaküla arose on the fens of Abja manor (mõis), after which it is named. It was a large railway hub in the 1920s and 1930s, when two narrow-gauge lines came through Mõisaküla, serving all of Estonia until the 1970s when the Soviets closed both lines. It became a town on 1 May 1938.

A Lutheran church was established in 1934, but was burned and destroyed in 1983; restoration of the church started in 2005 and the church reopened in 2014.

Mõisaküla is the birthplace of Olympic weightlifting medalist Arnold Luhaäär. Luhaäär's medals are on permanent display at the Mõisaküla Museum. It is also the birthplace of stage and film actress Rita Raave and actor Arno Liiver.

== Twin towns – sister cities ==
The former municipality of Mõisaküla was twinned with:

- Mikkeli, Finland

== Gallery ==
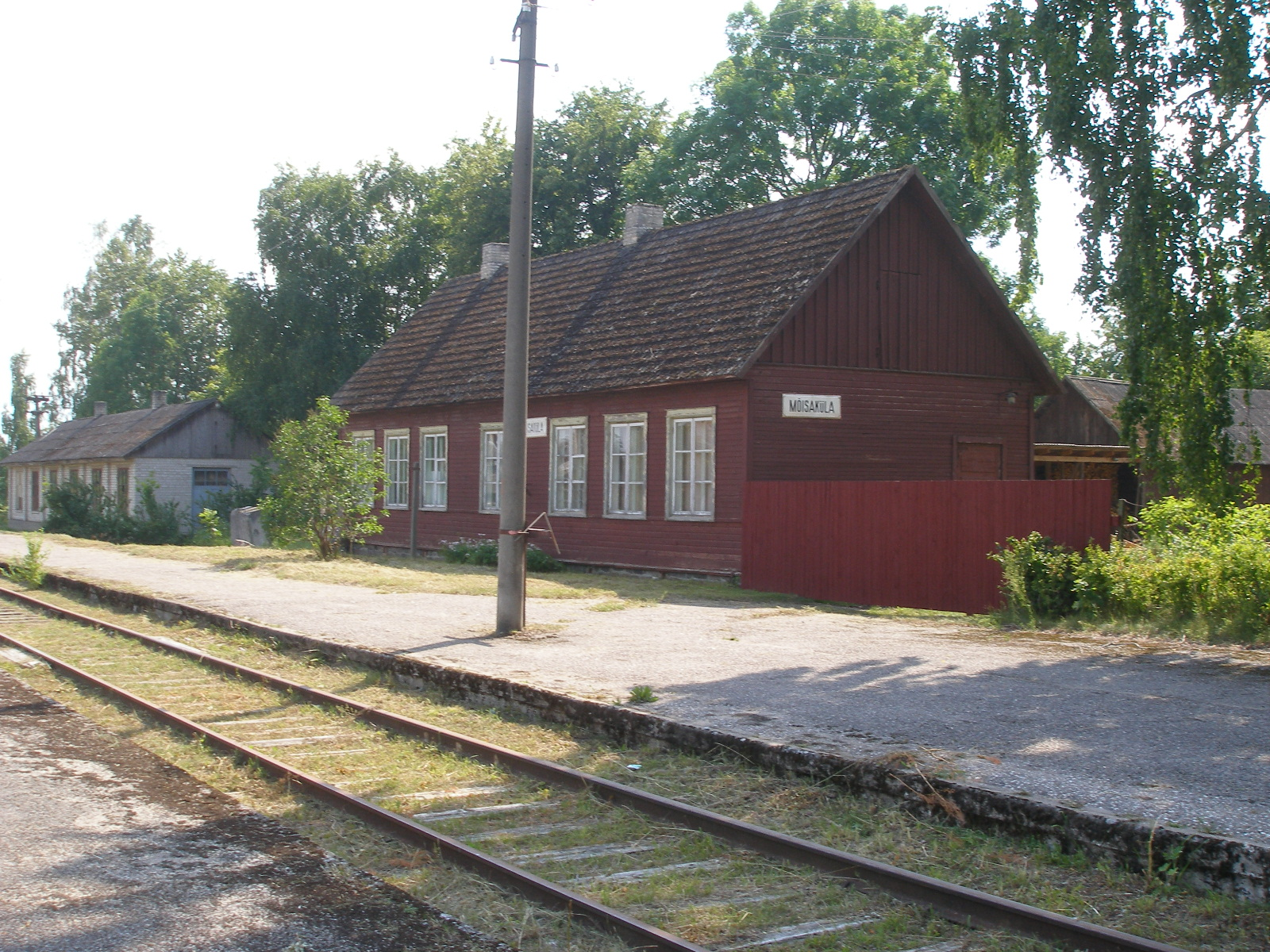
Mõisaküla railway station

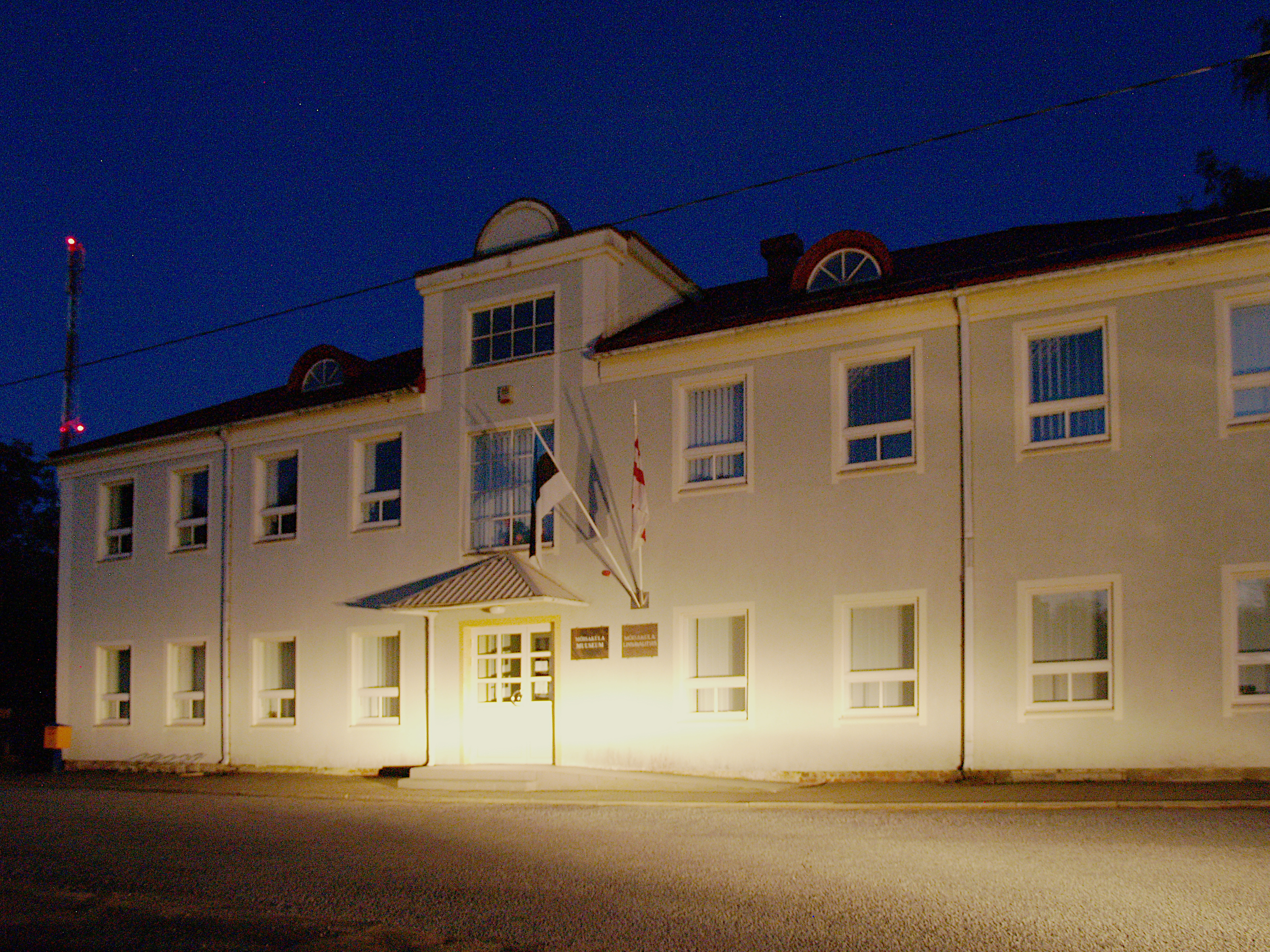
Municipal building (August 2012)

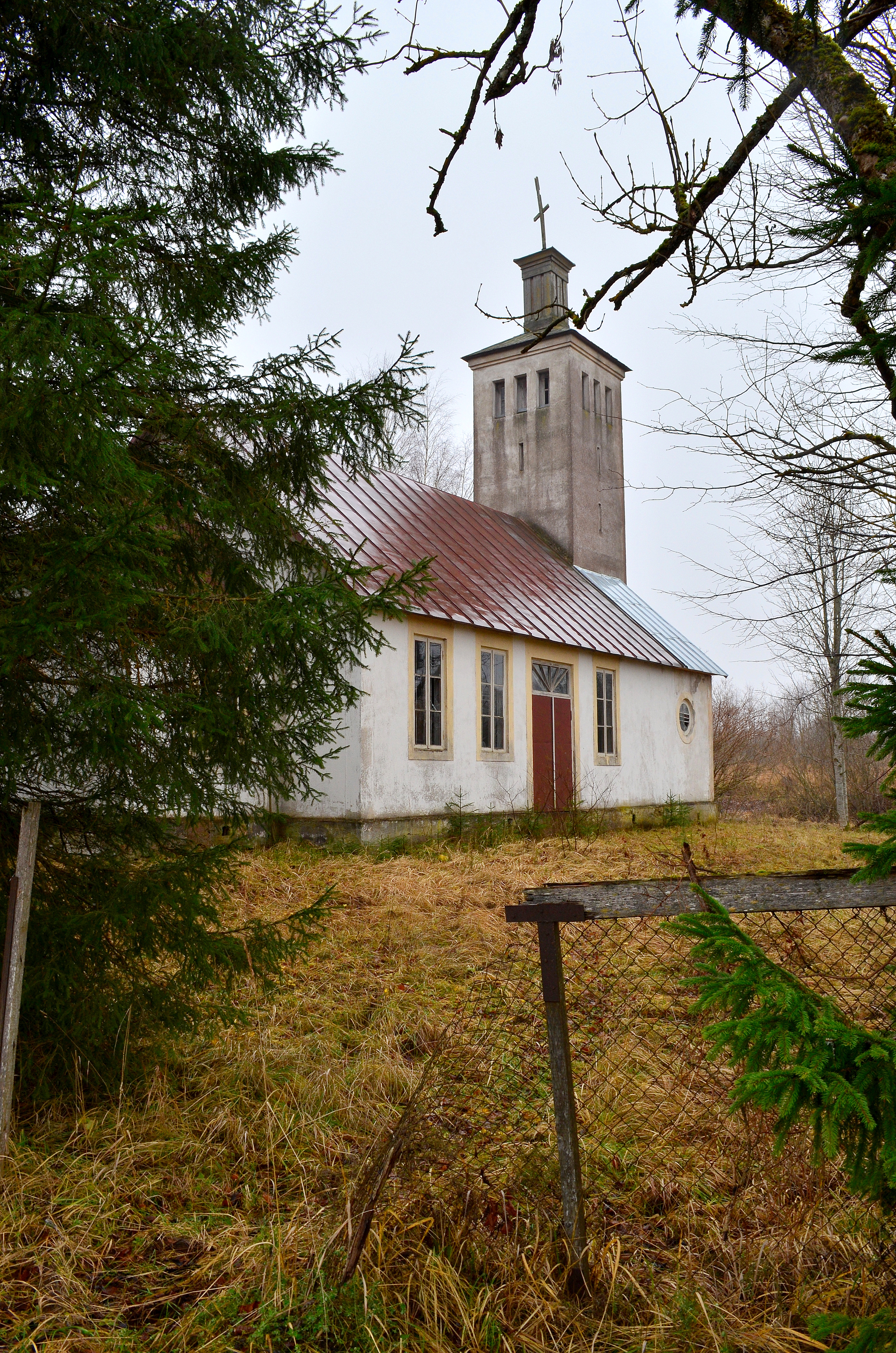
Estonian Orthodox church in Mõisaküla
