= Leeli, Estonia =

Village in Estonia

Leeli
- Village
- Location in Estonia
- Coordinates: 58°06′48″N 25°29′55″E
- Country: Estonia
- County: Viljandi County
- Municipality: Mulgi Parish

Population (2011 Census)
  - Total: 42
- Time zone: UTC+2 (EET)
  - Summer (DST): UTC+3 (EEST)

Leeli is a village in Mulgi Parish, Viljandi County, Estonia.
