= Kuno Pajula =

Estonian archbishop

The Most Reverend Kuno Pajula
- Archbishop of Tallinn; Primate of the Estonian Evangelical Lutheran Church
- Church: Estonian Evangelical Lutheran Church
- Archdiocese: Tallinn
- Elected: 11 June 1987
- In office: 1987–1994
- Predecessor: Edgar Hark
- Successor: Jaan Kiivit Jr.

Orders
- Ordination: 24 May 1950 by Jaan Kiivit Sr.
- Consecration: 15 November 1987 by John Vikström

Personal details
- Born: 11 March 1924 Käru, Virumaa, Estonia
- Died: 26 November 2012 (aged 88) Tallinn, Estonia
- Denomination: Lutheran
- Parents: August Pajula & Amanda Alber
- Spouse: Helgi Mägi
- Children: 2

Kuno Pajula (before 1936 Kuno Preis; 11 March 1924 – 26 November 2012) was an Estonian prelate who served as the Archbishop of Tallinn and Primate of the Estonian Evangelical Lutheran Church between 1987 and 1994.

== Early life and education ==
Pajula was born in Käru, Virumaa, the son of August Pajula and Amanda Alber. Between 1931 and 1942 he studied at Käru and Salla Primary School and Väike-Maarja Gymnasium. He studied at the Institute of Theology of the Estonian Evangelical Lutheran Church between 1949 and 1959. In 1960/61 he went for further training at the University of Göttingen in West Germany.

== Ministry ==
He was ordained priest on 24 May 1950 by Archbishop Jaan Kiivit Sr. in St. Mary's Cathedral, Tallinn. Between 1949 and 1950 and again between 1954 and 1957, he served as pastor of the parishes of Illuka and Iisaku. In 1950 he transferred to Kursi, Jõgeva County to become pastor of the parish church. Between 1954 and 1956 he was also responsible for the Alexander's Cathedral and in 1957 he became pastor of St. John's Church, Tallinn, where he remained till 1987.

== Archbishop ==
On 11 June 1987 the Church council elected Pajula Archbishop and Primate. He was consecrated on 15 November 1987 by John Vikström Archbishop of Turku and Finland and co-consecrated by Karl-Gunnar Grape Bishop of Skara; Olav Christian Lindegaard Bishop of Haderslev; Fredrik Grønningsæter Bishop of Sør-Hålogaland; Jan Michalko General Bishop of the Slovak Evangelical Lutheran Church; Dieter Knall Bishop of the Evangelical Church of the Augsburg Confession in Austria; and Gyula Nagy Bishop of the Evangelical-Lutheran Church in Hungary. He retired on 29 June 1994. He was the first President of the Estonian Council of Churches in 1989-1993 and member of the Central Committee of the World Council of Churches 1983–1992.

Titles in Lutheranism
Preceded by Edgar Hark	Archbishop of Tallinn; Primate of the Evangelical Lutheran Church of Estonia; 1987–1994	Succeeded by Jaan Kiivit, Jr
