= Kernumees =

Kernumees is an Estonian surname. Notable people with the surname include:

- Maret Kernumees (1934–1997), Estonian artist
- Raoul Kernumees (1905–1990), Estonian printmaker and painter
