= Kurimetsa Nature Reserve =

Protected area in Estonia

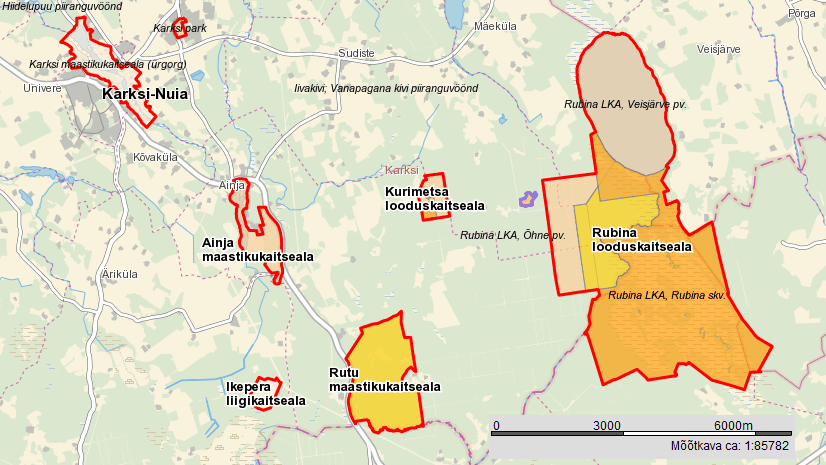

- Location within Estonia
- Location: Estonia
- Coordinates: 58°04′45″N 25°40′45″E
- Area: 52 ha (130 acres)
- Established: 1998 (2018)

Kurimetsa Nature Reserve is a nature reserve which is located in Viljandi County, Estonia.

The area of the nature reserve is 52 ha (130 acres).

The protected area was founded in 1998 to protect valuable habitat types and threatened species in Ainja and Sudiste villages (both in Mulgi Parish).
