= Eduard Timberman =

Estonian painter (1905–1935)

- Born: October 31, 1905; Tallinn, Estonia
- Died: July 11, 1935 (aged 29); Viljandi, Estonia
- Education: Pallas Art School (1919–1940)
- Occupation: Painter

Eduard Timberman (also Timbermann; October 31, 1905 – July 11, 1935) was an Estonian painter.

== Early life and education ==
Timberman was born in Tallinn, the son of Hendrik Timbermann (1867–1933) and Elise Timbermann (née Kullison, 1872–1932). He attended Jakob Westholm School. In 1918, the family moved to Auksi, near Viljandi. From 1918 to 1923, Timberman attended the high school for boys in Viljandi County. In 1923, Timberman started studying at the Pallas Art School in Tartu without completing high school. At first he was forced to work at the Viljandi table factory while a student, but starting in the 1925/26 academic year he received a scholarship for talented students from the Cultural Endowment of Estonia, which allowed him to continue his studies without also working. In 1930, Timberman graduated from Pallas as the only graduate that year and returned to Viljandi.

== Career ==
The early 1930s was a lively period in artistic life in Viljandi. In addition to Timberman, Gustav Mootse, Peeter Akerberg-Põldmaa, Juhan Kangilaski, and Lydia Nirk-Soosaar lived and worked in Viljandi. From time to time, the artists Ants Murakin, Villem Ormisson, and Juhan Muks also returned to the town.

During those years, Timberman became a prolific contributor to the local newspaper Sakala. Most of the Viljandi art exhibitions of that period were organized by Timberman, and they were often exhibited in the rooms of the German Casino at Post Street (Estonian: Posti tänav) 11. One of Timberman's boldest ideas was the construction of a modern art studio in Viljandi to bring artists together.

On July 11, 1935, Eduard Timberman died in the hospital in Viljandi as a result of pneumonia associated with tuberculosis. The artist was buried in the new cemetery of Saint Paul's Church in Viljandi.

== Work ==
Timberman's artwork is not very extensive. He is primarily known as a watercolorist. Using this technique, he captured views of Viljandi, Tartu, Kasaritsa, Sinialliku, Karksi, Taagepera, Saadjärve, and Pechory. In some of Timberman's oil paintings, the influence of Cézanne's Cubism of the time is reflected, and thus Timberman is one of the few in Estonian artists that continued the tradition created by another late but established artist in his own style, Kuno Veeber.
