= Karkus =

Karkus may refer to:

- Captain Karkus, a fictional character in the Doctor Who serial The Mind Robber
- Karkus, an old German name for the Estonian village of Karksi
  - Karkus-Nuija, German name for the nearby town of Karksi-Nuia
