= Pürg =

Family name

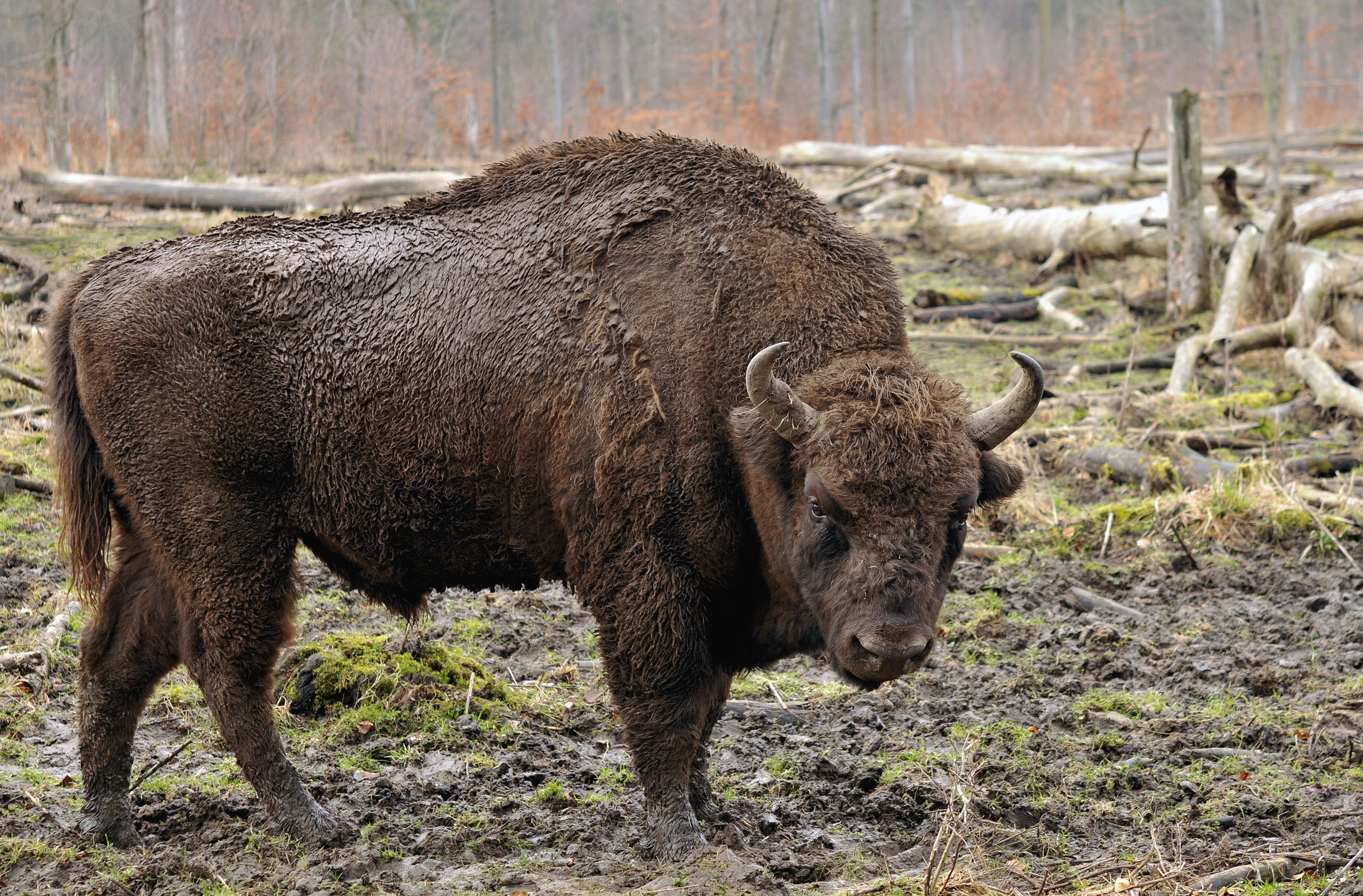

Origin
- Language: Estonian
- Meaning: 1. avidity 2. European bison (Bison bonasus)
- Region of origin: Estonia

Pürg is an Estonian surname with the dual meaning of both European bison (Bison bonasus) and avidity (extreme eagerness or enthusiasm) in the Estonian language.

As of 1 January 2023, 27 men and 31 women have the surname Pürg in Estonia. Pürg ranks 4442nd for men and 4220nd for women in the distribution of surnames in Estonia. The surname Pürg is the most commonly found in Viljandi County, where 4.38 per 10,000 inhabitants of the county bear the surname.

Individuals bearing the surname Pürg include:

- Henrik Pürg (born 1996), footballer
- Kaarel Pürg (born 1949), politician
- Pille Pürg (born 1972), actress, comedian and parodist
