= Karksi Landscape Conservation Area =

Protected area in Estonia

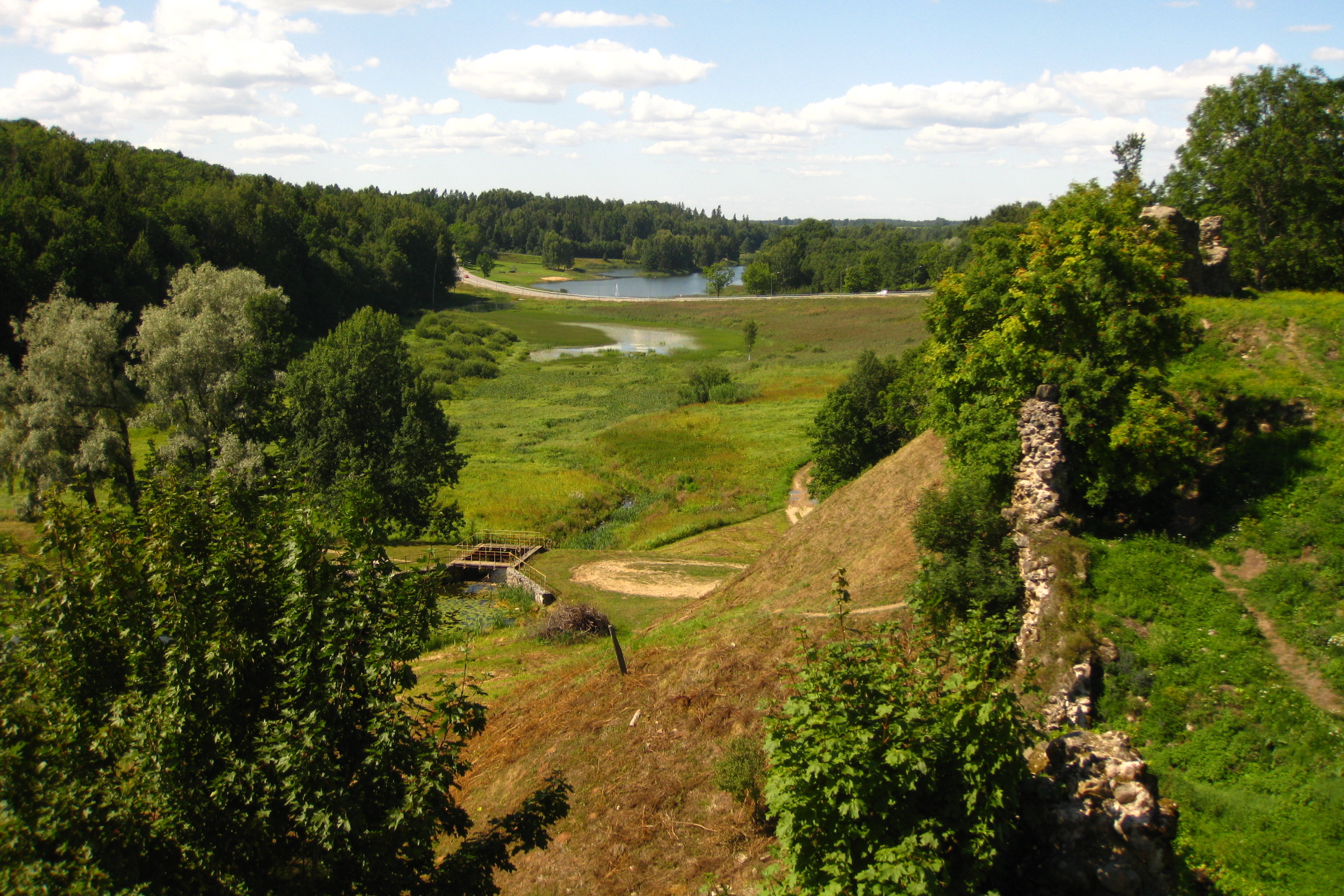

- Location within Estonia
- Location: Estonia
- Coordinates: 58°06′N 25°34′E
- Area: 210 ha (520 acres)
- Established: 2016

Karksi Landscape Conservation Area is a nature park situated in Viljandi County, Estonia.

Its area is 210 ha.

The protected area was designated in 2016 to protect Karksi or Halliste Ancient Valley along with its biodiversity.
