= Hirmuküla =

Village in Estonia

- Village
- Location in Estonia
- Coordinates: 58°08′N 25°38′E
- Country: Estonia
- County: Viljandi County
- Municipality: Mulgi Parish

Population (2011 Census)
  - Total: 28

Hirmuküla (German: Hirmoküll) is a village in Mulgi Parish in Viljandi County in southern Estonia. It borders the villages Mäeküla, Sudiste, Karksi, Oti, Morna and Tuhalaane as well as Viljandi Parish. The name means village of fear in Estonian.
