= Edgar Hark =

Estonian theologian (1908–1986)

The Most Reverend Edgar Hark
- Archbishop of Tallinn; Primate of the Estonian Evangelical Lutheran Church
- Church: Estonian Evangelical Lutheran Church
- Archdiocese: Tallinn
- Elected: 31 May 1978
- In office: 1978–1986
- Predecessor: Alfred Tooming
- Successor: Kuno Pajula

Orders
- Ordination: 29 March 1936
- Consecration: 31 October 1978 by Mikko Juva

Personal details
- Born: 8 October 1908 Tartu, Governorate of Livonia, Russian Empire (Present-day Estonia)
- Died: 23 October 1986 (aged 78) Tallinn, Estonia
- Buried: Torma Cemetery
- Denomination: Lutheran
- Parents: Saul & Alvine Hark
- Spouse: Anneliis Bodo
- Children: 1
- Education: University of Tartu

Ordination history of Edgar Hark
History
Priestly ordination
- Ordained by: Hugo Bernhard Rahamägi
Episcopal consecration
- Principal consecrator: Mikko Juva
- Co-consecrators: Olof Sundby; Jānis Matulis; Jonas Kalvanas; Åke Kastlund

Edgar Hark (8 October 1908 - 23 October 1986) was an Estonian prelate who was the Archbishop of Tallinn and Primate of the Estonian Evangelical Lutheran Church between 1978 and 1986.

== Early life and education ==
Hark was born on 8 October 1908 in Tartu in the Governorate of Livonia of the Russian Empire, the son of Saul and Alvine Hark. Soon thereafter, the family moved to Saint Petersburg where they lived for a time. In Saint Petersburg he started his schooling at the Elementary School of the Estonian Educational Society. In 1920, the family moved back to Estonia. He received his secondary education at the Hugo Treffner Gymnasium in Tartu and graduated in 1928. He then spent some time in the military. In 1929, he commenced his theology studies at the University of Tartu. Due to the economic strains that his family experienced, Hark had to work as a student between 1930 and 1935 to support himself and his family, since his father was unemployed. In the spring of 1935 he graduated from university.

== Ordained ministry ==
Hark was ordained priest on 29 March 1936 in St. Mary's Cathedral, Tallinn. On 25 November 1936 he became vicar of the Mustvee Church and on 10 February 1937 he became vicar of Lohusuu Church. From 1 January 1937 Hark also served as a vicar of the newly founded Tudulinna. In 1941, he was mobilised in the Red Army. He was demobilised as captain in 1945. He then continued to serve as priest in Mustvee. On 1 July 1946 he also became acting vicar of Torma Church. From 20 April 1947 Hark was confirmed as a teacher became the vicar of Torma Church and whilst serving as deputy vicar at the Mustvee Church, where he was previously vicar. On 16 September 1948 he was appointed Dean of the Tartu deanery. On 22 July 1954 he was appointed vicar of Charles' Church, Tallinn. On 4 May 1955 Archbishop Jaan Kiivit Sr. named Hark as his permanent deputy. The next Archbishop, Alfred Tooming also named Hark as his permanent deputy on 18 October 1967. Hark was appointed Dean of Tallinn on 1 October 1972, but resigned for health reasons on 10 September 1974.

== Archbishop ==
After the death of Archbishop Alfred Tooming, Hark was elected acting archbishop from 19 October 1977 until a successor could be elected. The Church Council elected him archbishop on 31 May 1978. He was consecrated on 31 October 1978 by Mikko Juva Archbishop of Turku and Finland and co-consecrated by Olof Sundby Archbishop of Uppsala; Jānis Matulis Archbishop of Riga; Jonas Kalvanas Bishop of the Evangelical Lutheran Church in Lithuania and Åke Kastlund Bishop of Strängnäs. The archbishop died in office in Hospital number IV in Tallinn on 23 October 1986. He was buried on 4 November at Torma Cemetery.

== Awards ==
Hark was awarded three honorary doctorates by the Károli Gáspár University of the Reformed Church in Hungary, the University of Helsinki and the Institute of Theology of the Estonian Evangelical Lutheran Church. He served as a representative of both Estonian and USSR churches abroad for 84 times. The Moscow Patriarchate awarded him with the Order of Saint Vladimir. He was also awarded with the Order of the Patriotic War, the Order of Friendship of Peoples, five medals and the honorary prize of the Presidium of the Supreme Soviet of the Estonian Soviet Socialist Republic.

Titles in Lutheranism
Preceded by Alfred Tooming	Archbishop of Tallinn and Primate of the Estonian Evangelical Lutheran Church; 1978–1986	Succeeded by Kuno Pajula
