= Jaan Kiivit Jr. =

Estonian archbishop

The Most Reverend Jaan Kiivit Jr.
- Archbishop of Tallinn; Primate of the Estonian Evangelical Lutheran Church
- Church: Estonian Evangelical Lutheran Church
- Archdiocese: Tallinn
- Elected: 29 June 1994
- In office: 1994–2005
- Predecessor: Kuno Pajula
- Successor: Andres Põder

Orders
- Ordination: 2 February 1966 by Jaan Kiivit Sr.
- Consecration: 31 October 1994 by Yrjö Sariola

Personal details
- Born: 19 February 1940 Rakvere, Estonia
- Died: 31 August 2005 (aged 65) St Petersburg, Russia
- Denomination: Lutheran
- Spouse: Sirje Kiivit
- Children: 3

Ordination history of Jaan Kiivit Jr.
History
Priestly ordination
- Ordained by: Jaan Kiivit Sr.
- Date: 2 February 1966
- Place: St. Mary's Cathedral, Tallinn
Episcopal consecration
- Principal consecrator: Yrjö Sariola
- Co-consecrators: Henrik Svenungsson; John Hind; Kuno Pajula; Udo Petersoo; Konrad Veem; Einar Soone
- Date: 31 October 1994
- Place: St. Mary's Cathedral, Tallinn

Jaan Kiivit Jr. (19 February 1940 – 31 August 2005) was the Archbishop of the Estonian Evangelical Lutheran Church from 1994 until 2005.

== Biography ==
Jaan Kiivit was born on 19 February 1940 in Rakvere in Estonia in the family of the priest and later the archbishop Jaan Kiivit Sr. In 1959 he graduated from the secondary school and began his studies at the Theological Institute of the Estonian Evangelical Lutheran Church. In 1964 he was appointed a curate at the church of the Holy Ghost and as the parish priest the following year. Jaan Kiivit was ordained in 1966 and he worked as a pastor of the Holy Ghost Church until 1994. In 1980 he became deputy member of the Consistory and in 1986 he became an assessor. In 1990 he was a member of the Consistory Board. Jaan Kiivit Jr was elected archbishop of Tallinn and of the Estonian Evangelical Lutheran Church the Estonian Evangelical Church archbishop in 1994.

Between 1978 and 1994 Jaan Kiivit was a lecturer of practical theology at the Theological Institute in Tallinn, 1989-1991 he worked as an Institute curator, 1991–1992 as the rector. In 1990 and 1991 Jaan Kiivit was the representative of the EELC in the working group for reopening the Faculty of Theology at the University of Tartu. 1989–1994 he co-ordinates the cooperation between the Estonian Lutheran Church and the North Elbian Church. From 1992 he was chairman of the Foreign Relations Council of the EELC.

He has represented the EELC in many international conferences. He took part in the Eighth Assembly of the Lutheran World Federation in Curitiba (1990) as an official visitor. He was the EELC delegate of the Ninth Assembly of the Lutheran World Federation in Hong Kong (1997). Archbishop Jaan Kiivit was the first Estonian to be elected as member of the LWF Council. In 1994 he became a member of the Presidium of the Leuenberg Concordia Executive Committee. Archbishop Kiivit was a co-chairman of the joint commission of Estonian Government and EELC since it was established in 1995. He was a curator of the University of Tartu. In 1997 Jaan Kiivit received an honorary degree (Dr.h.c.) from the Helsinki University and in 1998 Dr.h.c. from the Suomi College in USA. In 2001 he received the 2nd class order of the White Star from the President of the Estonian Republic.

Kiivit translated theological and religious books and articles from Greek, German and Finnish. He published study materials for the Theological Institute and a collection of sermons. Kiivit was married for 43 years to Sirje Kiivit (Henno) (1941–2014). They had three daughters. Archbishop Kiivit died on 31 August 2005 while visiting St Petersburg, Russia.

Titles in Lutheranism
| Preceded by Kuno Pajula | Archbishop of the Estonian Evangelical Lutheran Church; 1994–2005 | Succeeded by Andres Põder |
