= Käru, Lääne-Viru County =

Village in Estonia

Coordinates: 58°57′07″N 26°26′21″E

Käru
- Village
- Interactive map of Käru
- Country: Estonia
- County: Lääne-Viru County
- Parish: Väike-Maarja Parish
- Time zone: UTC+2 (EET)
  - Summer (DST): UTC+3 (EEST)

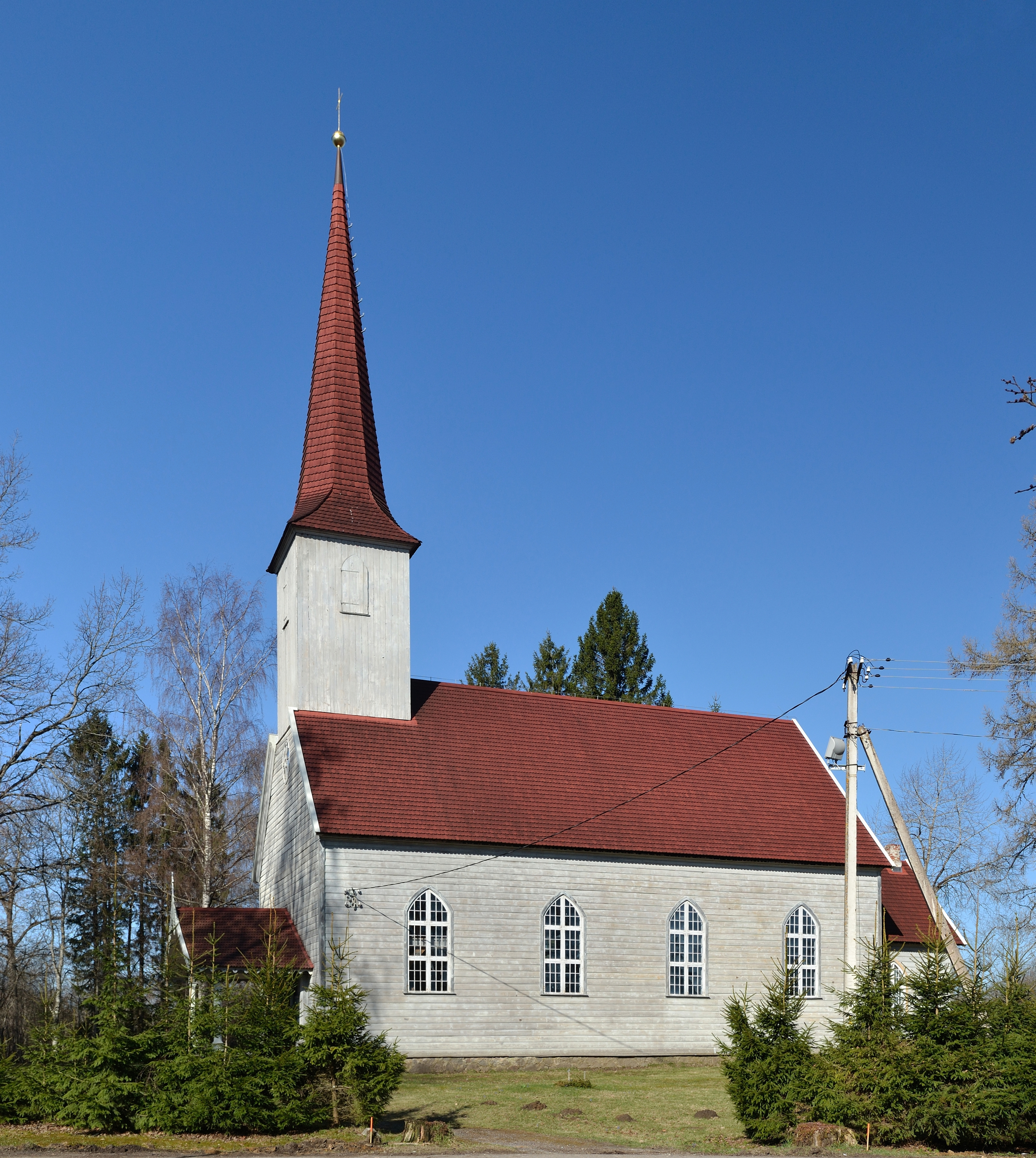
Wooden church built in 1860, Käru.

Käru is a village in Väike-Maarja Parish, Lääne-Viru County, in northeastern Estonia.

Politician and entrepreneur Juhan Kukk (1885–1942), actor Hugo Laur (1893–1977) and former archbishop Kuno Pajula (1924–2012) were born in Käru.
