= Ainja =

- Village
- Location in Estonia
- Coordinates: 58°05′N 25°37′E
- Country: Estonia
- County: Viljandi County
- Municipality: Mulgi Parish

Population (2011 Census)
  - Total: 53

Ainja (German: Fahrensbach) is a village in Mulgi Parish in Viljandi County in southern Estonia. It borders the villages Mäeküla, Sudiste, Karksi, Kõvaküla and Äriküla as well as Helme Parish.
