= Tallinn English College =

School in Tallinn

Coordinates: 59.433467°N 24.746817°E

- Tallinna Inglise Kolledž
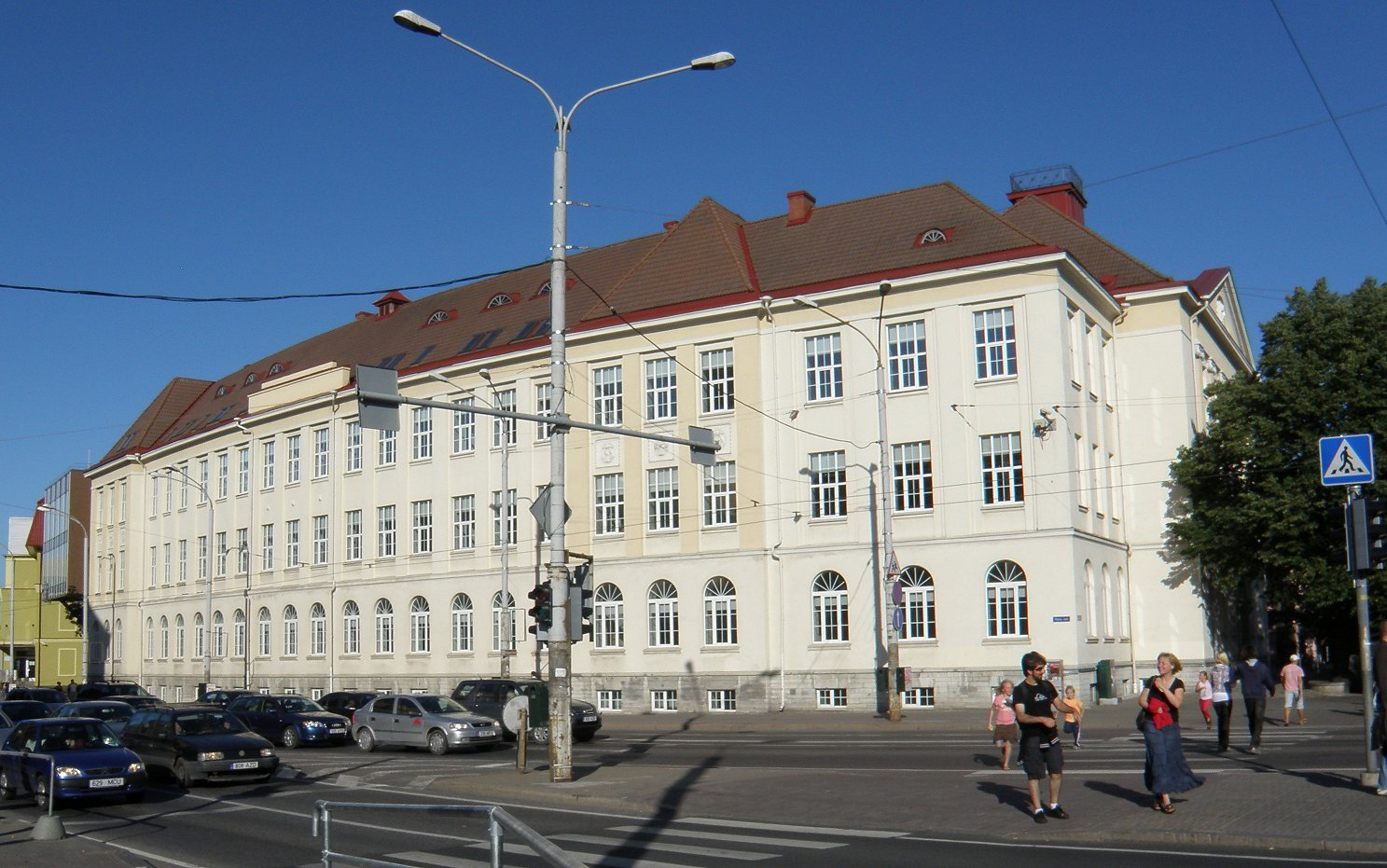

Location
- Estonia Puiestee 10; Tallinn; Estonia

Information
- Type: Public
- Established: September 1940
- Principal: Toomas Kruusimägi
- Grades: 1–12
- Age: 7 to 19
- Enrollment: 759
- Language: English
- Colors: Dark blue, red, white
- Website: tik.edu.ee

The sports complex

Tallinn English College (Estonian: Tallinna Inglise Kolledž) is a coeducational general education school in Tallinn, Estonia with in-depth education in English. It has elementary, middle, and senior levels with students 7 to 18 years old.

== History ==
The history of the college starts in 1940, when Tallinn Secondary School No. 7 was created by merging Tallinn French School and Jakob Westholm Grammar School. The school was located in the building on Hariduse Street erected for the French Lyceum in 1937. Its name returned to Jakob Westholm Grammar School in 1941 under the German occupation authorities, but its original name was lost again in 1944 when the Soviet occupation was restored. The students had to survive more mergers with other schools. Finally the college became one of the few elite schools specializing in English in Soviet-occupied Estonia.

In 1996, the school was renamed Tallinn English College and moved to its current location on Estonia Puiestee in the heart of Tallinn.

== Notable alumni ==
- Yoko Alender, architect
- Kristo Käärmann, co-founder of Wise
- Kaja Kallas, Prime Minister of Estonia
- Maret Kernumees, artist
- Jüri Krjukov, actor
- Anu Lamp, actress
- Rein Lang, Minister of Culture
- Mihkel Raud, singer, guitarist and journalist
- Riina Sildos, film producer
- Meeli Sööt, actress
