= Lake Auksi =

Lake in Estonia

- Auksi järv (Estonian)
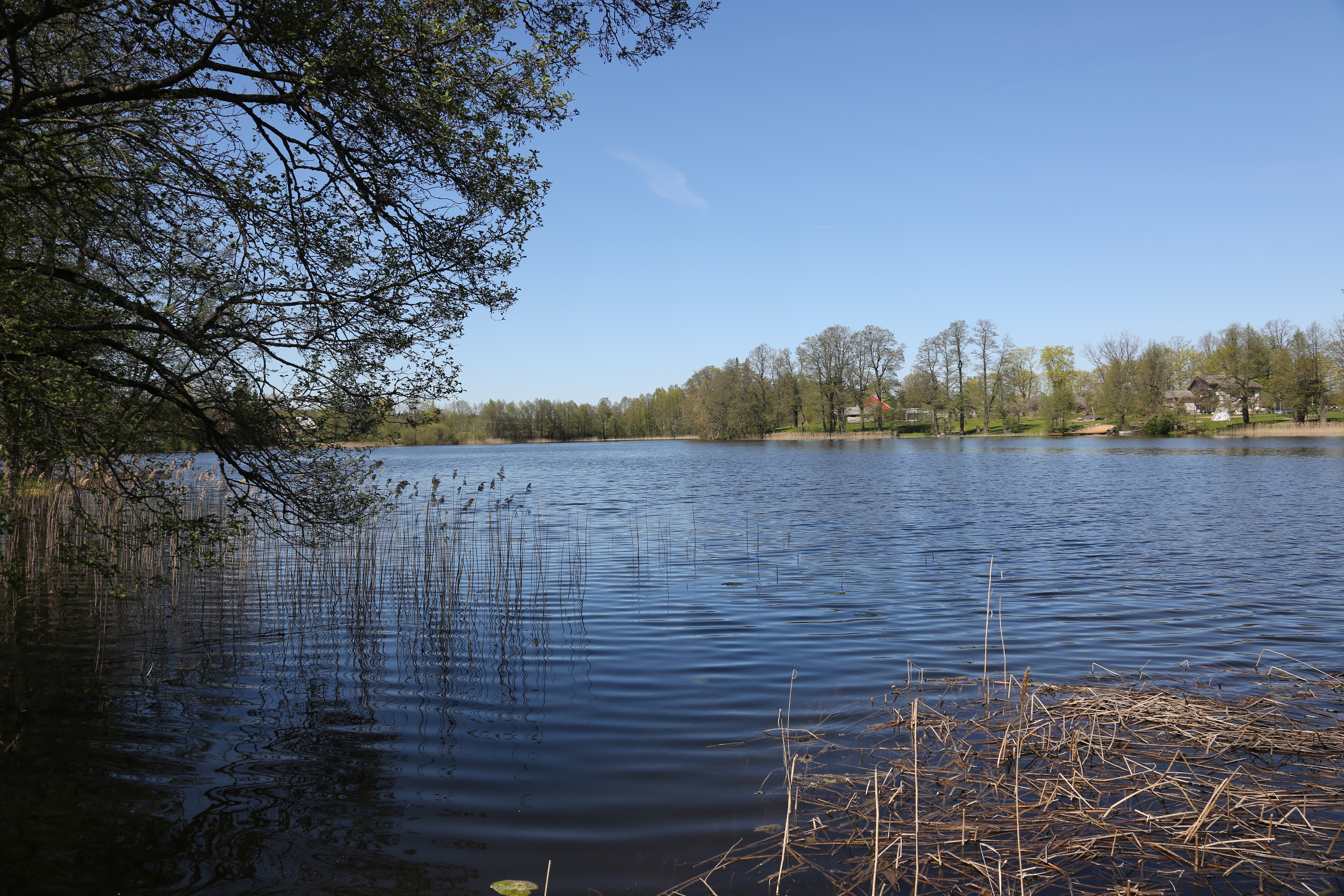

- Location within Estonia
- Location: Auksi, Viljandi County, Estonia
- Coordinates: 58°27′45″N 25°35′20″E
- Basin countries: Estonia
- Max. length: 480 meters (1,570 ft)
- Surface area: 8.1 hectares (20 acres)
- Max. depth: 9.4 meters (31 ft)
- Shore length^{1}: 1,340 meters (4,400 ft)
- Surface elevation: 99.5 meters (326 ft)
- ^{1} Shore length is not a well-defined measure.

Lake Auksi (Estonian: Auksi järv) is a lake in Estonia. It is located in the village of Auksi in Viljandi Parish, Viljandi County.

== Physical description ==
The lake has an area of 8.1 hectares (20 acres). It is 480 meters (1,570 ft) long, and its shoreline measures 1,340 meters (4,400 ft).

== See also ==
- List of lakes of Estonia
