= Valdur Ohakas =

Estonian painter (1925–1998)

- Born: December 26, 1928; Tallinn, Estonia
- Died: February 16, 1998 (aged 69); Tallinn, Estonia
- Education: Estonian Academy of Arts
- Occupation: Painter

Valdur-Olev Ohakas (December 26, 1925 – February 16, 1998) was an Estonian painter.

== Early life and education ==
Valdur Ohakas was born in Tallinn, Estonia, the son of Johannes Ohakas (1900–1979) and Agathe Elise Ohakas (née Kirnmann, 1903–1997). The artist Raoul Kernumees was his maternal uncle. He attended Tallinn Primary School No. 21, Tallinn Middle School No. 2, Tallinn Trade School, and Tallinn Evening Technical School. From 1942 to 1943, he studied at the Tallinn School of Fine and Applied Arts under Eerik Haamer and Johannes Greenberg. From 1943 to 1944, he was mobilized into the German army. From 1944 to 1948, he studied at the Tartu State Art Institute under Johannes Võerahansu and Elmar Kits, but he did not graduate from the school because in 1949 he was arrested with a group of art students and sent to the Vorkuta Gulag in the Karaganda Region of the Kazakh SSR. He was released in 1956.

== Career ==
Ohakas started showing his works at exhibitions in 1946, and in 1959 he became a member of the Artists Union of the Estonian SSR. Ohakas participated in the renewal of Estonian art in the 1960s, and he was in close contact with Ülo Sooster and many artists from Tartu and Tallinn. The height of Ohakas's work was the 1960s and 1970s, when romantic landscapes were central to his versatile creations.

== Works ==
Ohakas's work in the late 1950s was characterized by the "harsh style" (Estonian: karm stiil) (e.g., Pirita, 1959). At the beginning of the 1960s, he mainly cultivated still lifes, in which color and the light–dark contrast become increasingly important (e.g., Natüürmort kaladega 'Still Life with Fish', 1965; Vanad asjad 'Old Things', 1968). Starting with the end of the 1960s, his geometrizing style often reached the point of being abstract or surreal (e.g., Natüürmort kannuga 'Still Life with a Pitcher', 1970; Linn 'City', 1973; Antiik 'Antiquity', 1974). In the 1960s and 1970s, romantic landscape visions took center stage (e.g., Mütoloogiline maastik 'Mythological Landscape', 1971; Järvede org sügisel 'Valley of Lakes in Autumn', 1978; Tee 'Road', 1982).
