= Udeva =

Village in Estonia

Coordinates: 58°56′N 26°01′E

- Village
- Interactive map of Udeva
- Country: Estonia
- County: Järva County
- Parish: Järva Parish
- Time zone: UTC+2 (EET)
  - Summer (DST): UTC+3 (EEST)

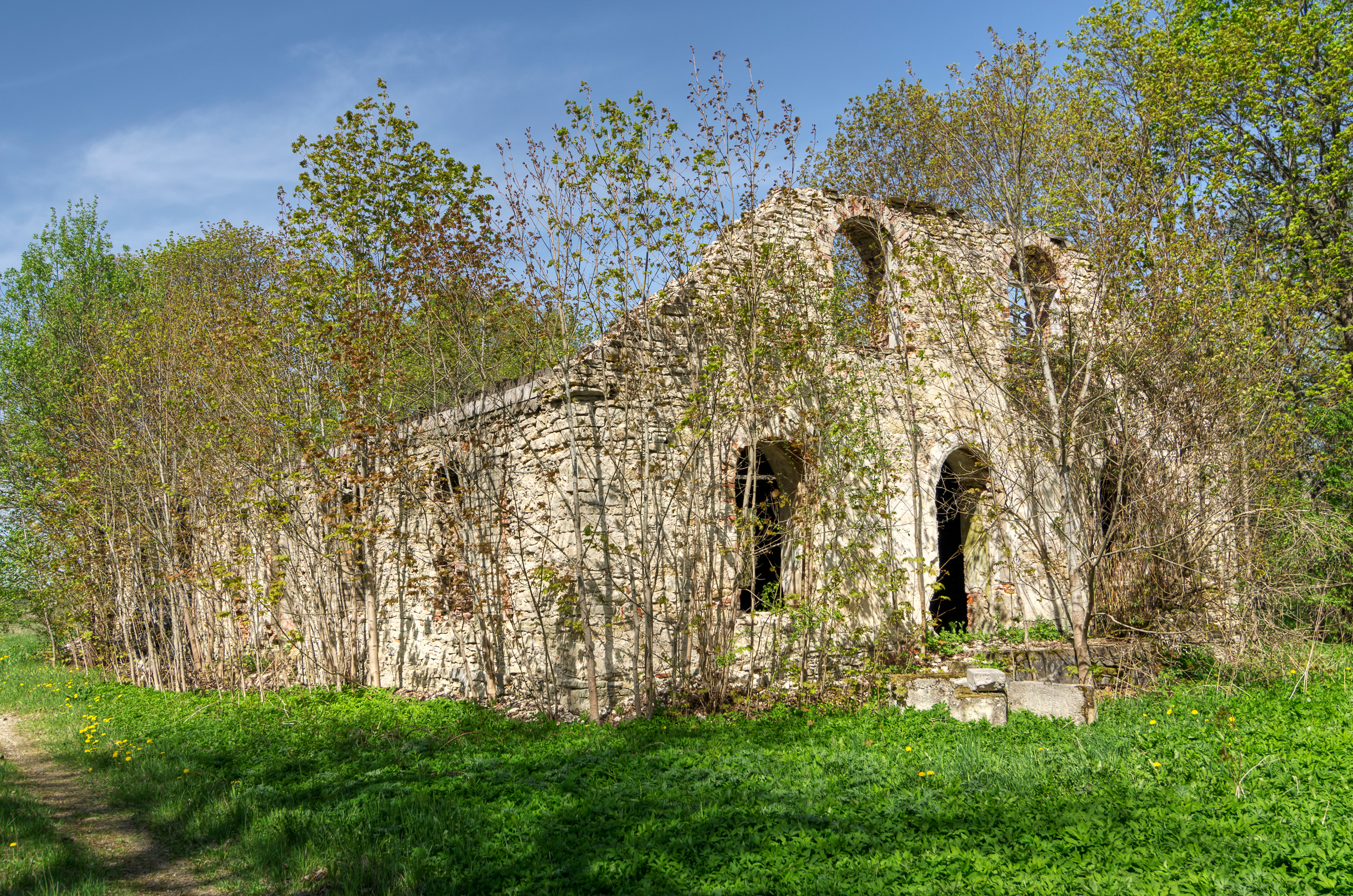

Udeva (German: Uddewa) is a village in Järva Parish, Järva County in northern-central Estonia.

== Notable people ==
Notable people that were born or lived in Udeva include the following:

- Raoul Kernumees (1905–1990), printmaker and painter
