= Juhan Muks =

Estonian artist

Juhan Jaagu Muks (7 July 1899 – 23 November 1983) was an Estonian artist and painter.

Juhan Muks was born in Tuhalaane, Viljandi County, Estonia. He acquired a higher education abroad before returning to his native Estonia and following his fellow countrymen Adamson-Eric, Eduard Wiiralt, Lydia Mei, Kristjan Teder, Eduard Ole, and Felix Randel in popularizing the Neue Sachlichkeit (New Objectivity) art movement throughout Estonia in the 1920s. The group also initiated the tradition of art exhibitions throughout the country. Muks is best known for his paintings of rural Estonian landscapes.

Muks was a previous winner of The Estonian Artists' Association Konrad Mägi Award; A medal and a cash award that are given yearly to an artist whose art piece, series of pieces or exhibition has "enriched Estonian painting".

Muks died on 23 November 1983 in Viljandi and was buried in the Viljandi Metsakalmistu cemetery.

== References/External links ==
- Viljandi Tourism Information
- Neue Sachlichkeit in Estonian Art (In English)
