= Raoul Kernumees =

Estonian painter (1905–1990)

- Born: Raoul Kirnmann; October 25, 1905; Udeva, Governorate of Estonia, Russian Empire
- Died: June 25, 1990 (aged 84); Estonia
- Education: State Industrial Art School, Pallas Art School (1919–1940)
- Occupations: Printmaker, painter
- Children: Maret Kernumees

Raoul Kernumees (until 1936 Raoul Kirnmann; October 25, 1905 – June 25, 1990) was an Estonian printmaker and painter.

== Early life and education ==
Kernumees was born in Udeva, the son of Juhan Kernumees (né Kirnmann, 1862–?) and Anna Maria Kirnmann (née Kontrakt, 1877–1918). He was the youngest child in a family of five children. He started his schooling at the Rakvere Educational Society School, and his next-door neighbor was the future artist Hando Mugasto.

In 1917, the family moved to Tallinn. In 1918, he started studying at Tallinn City High School on Vene tänav (Russian Street). His drawing teacher there noticed Kernumees's artistic talent and advised him to continue his studies at the State Industrial Art School. Kernumees studied there from 1921 to 1923. In 1925, Kernumees, together with Erich Leps, Kaarel Liimand, and Andrus Johani, went to study at the Pallas Art School in Tartu. His studies at Pallas were interrupted (1925–1927, 1930–1931, 1933) due to both financial reasons and the tuberculosis that shattered his health in 1927. Kernumees's name first appears in the catalog of exhibition works by Pallas students in 1925.

== Career ==
Kernumees started presenting his work at art exhibitions in 1931, mainly with prints. In 1932, the Estonian Government Foundation for the Fine Arts acquired four of Kernumees's works: Külakõrts (Village Inn), Põrgu (Hell), Peaparandus (Hair of the Dog), and Tulekahi (Conflagration), and he was awarded a scholarship for six months (his fellow scholarship recipient was Eduard Timberman. From then on, Kernumees consistently exhibited almost every year, except for the more severe years of his illness from 1936 to 1938. In 1942, the publisher Eesti Kirjastus ordered illustrations from Kernumees for the Nibelungenlied translated by Marta Sillaots. Kernumees created 12 ink drawings, but they were lost in the chaos of the war, and the book was never published. However, these illustrations were exhibited once in 1944. Kernumees also continued to participate in exhibitions in Estonia under Soviet rule.

== Works ==
Kernumees attracted attention as an especially virtuosic and detailed draftsman, and a master of figural compositions. He mainly portrayed villagers, whose monotonous everyday life was enhanced by a bottle of vodka and a song accompanied by an accordion. Nationalism also characterizes Kernumees's fantastic grotesque drawings; for example, Põrgu (Hell; 1931, ink, Art Museum of Estonia), created at the same time as Eduard Wiiralt's etching of the same name. In addition to painting landscapes and still lifes in oil, Kernumees was also a portraitist, mainly in pastel. He painted many portraits of cultural figures.

== Family ==
Kernumees married Liidia Kivikas (1913–1985); their daughter was the artist Maret Kernumees (1934–1997) and their son was the musician Koit Kernumees (1947–2011). The artist Valdur Ohakas was Kernumees's nephew.
