= Tuhalaane =

Village in Estonia

- Village
- Kopra tourist farm in Tuhalaane

- Location in Estonia
- Coordinates: 58°11′N 25°39′E
- Country: Estonia
- County: Viljandi County
- Municipality: Mulgi Parish

Population (2011 Census)
  - Total: 106
- Time zone: UTC+2 (EET)
  - Summer (DST): UTC+3 (EEST)

Tuhalaane is a village in Mulgi Parish in Viljandi County in southern Estonia. It borders the villages of Hirmuküla, Morna, Muri, and Suuga as well as Viljandi Parish.

== Notable people ==
- Ants Piip (1884–1942), politician and diplomat
- Jaan Tomp (1894–1924), communist party official and politician
- Juhan Muks (1899–1983), painter
- Kaarel Pürg (born 1949), politician
- Jaan Kiivit Sr. (1906–1971), Lutheran archbishop
