= Mäeküla, Mulgi Parish =

Village in Estonia

Mäeküla
- Village
- Location in Estonia
- Coordinates: 58.1101°N 25.69106°E
- Country: Estonia
- County: Viljandi County
- Municipality: Mulgi Parish

Population (2011 Census)
  - Total: 31
- Time zone: UTC+2 (EET)
  - Summer (DST): UTC+3 (EEST)

Mäeküla is a village in Mulgi Parish in Viljandi County in southern Estonia. It borders the villages Hirmuküla, Sudiste, Ainja as well as Viljandi Parish.

== Demographics ==
Population as of 1 January of each listed year.

Year	Population
1999	38
2000	37
2001	36
2002	34
2003	32
2004	31
2005	31
2006	31
2007	28
