= Sudiste, Viljandi County =

Village in Estonia

Sudiste
- Village
- Location in Estonia
- Coordinates: 58°06′N 25°39′E
- Country: Estonia
- County: Viljandi County
- Municipality: Mulgi Parish

Population (2011 Census)
  - Total: 113
- Time zone: UTC+2 (EET)
  - Summer (DST): UTC+3 (EEST)

Sudiste is a village in Mulgi Parish in Viljandi County in southern Estonia. It borders the villages Mäeküla, Ainja, Karksi and Hirmuküla.
