= Auksi =

Village in Estonia

- Village
- Location in Estonia
- Coordinates: 58°27′45″N 25°35′35″E
- Country: Estonia
- County: Viljandi County
- Municipality: Viljandi Parish

Population (01.01.2010)
  - Total: 60

Auksi is a village in Viljandi Parish, Viljandi County, Estonia. It has a population of 60 (as of 1 January 2010). It was a part of Saarepeedi Parish until 2013.

== Notable people ==
Notable people that were born or lived in Auksi include the following:

- Eduard Timberman (1905–1935), painter

== See also ==
- Lake Auksi
