= Äriküla =

- Village
- Location in Estonia
- Coordinates: 58°04′N 25°34′E
- Country: Estonia
- County: Viljandi County
- Municipality: Mulgi Parish

Population (2011 Census)
  - Total: 98

Äriküla (German: Erküll) is a village in Mulgi Parish in Viljandi County in southern Estonia. It borders the villages of Ainja, Lilli, and Metsaküla.
