= Alfred Tooming =

Estonian theologian

The Most Reverend Alfred Tooming
- Archbishop of Tallinn; Primate of the Estonian Evangelical Lutheran Church
- Church: Estonian Evangelical Lutheran Church
- Archdiocese: Tallinn
- Elected: 12 October 1967
- In office: 1967–1977
- Predecessor: Jaan Kiivit Sr.
- Successor: Edgar Hark

Orders
- Ordination: 2 September 1934
- Consecration: 9 June 1968 by Martti Simojoki

Personal details
- Born: 5 July 1907 Ülejõe, Anija Parish, Governorate of Estonia, Russian Empire (Present-day Estonia)
- Died: 5 October 1977 (aged 70) Tallinn, Estonia
- Denomination: Lutheran
- Parents: Tõnu Tooming & Miina Roop
- Spouse: Senta Kikerpill
- Children: 4
- Education: University of Tartu

Alfred Tooming (5 July 1907 – 5 October 1977) was an Estonian prelate who served as the Archbishop of Tallinn and Primate of the Estonian Evangelical Lutheran Church between 1967 and 1977.

He was born at the Idu farm in Ülejõe, Anija Parish, Governorate of Estonia in the Russian Empire, the son of Tõnu Tooming and Miina Roop. He studied at Kehra Municipal School between 1916 and 1919 and in 1927 graduated from the Jakob Westholm Gymnasium. From 1927 to 1932 he studied at the Faculty of Theology of the University of Tartu. He was ordained priest in St. Mary's Cathedral, Tallinn on 2 September 1934.

In 1934 he served as vicar of St. James' Church in Võnnu and then deputy vicar of the parish in Käina. In 1935 he became vicar of St. John the Baptist Church, also known as Harju-Jaani church in Raasiku. Between 1941 and 1945 he was mobilised by the Red Army. he returned to his post in Raasiku in 1945. Between 1946 and 1959 he served in Jõelähtme's Church while in 1949 he transferred to Viljandi to become vicar of St. Paul's Church and Provost of the Viljandi deanery.

On 12 October 1967, after the resignation of Jaan Kiivit Sr., he was elected Archbishop of the Estonian church, and was consecrated on 9 June 1968 in St. Mary's Cathedral. He was consecrated by Martti Simojoki, Archbishop of Turku and Finland and co-consecrated by Aarre Lauha, Bishop of Helsinki. Tooming died in 1977.

== Family ==
On 25 May 1935, Tooming married Senta Kikerpill and together had four children, of whom their daughter, Maare Kümnik (1936–2015), was a notable Estonian bibliographer. Tooming's grandson is Ants Tooming, who since 2015 has been Provost of Tartu.

Titles in Lutheranism
Preceded by Jaan Kiivit Sr.	Archbishop of Tallinn and Primate of the Estonian Evangelical Lutheran Church; 1967–1977	Succeeded by Edgar Hark
