= Kaarel Pürg =

Estonian politician (born 1949)

Kaarel Pürg (born 2 October 1949) is an Estonian politician. He was a member of X Riigikogu.

Pürg was born in Tuhalaane./ He is a member of Estonian Centre Party.
