= Maret Kernumees =

Estonian artist (1934–1997)

- Born: Maret Kirnmann; July 20, 1934; Tallinn, Estonia
- Died: March 12, 1997 (aged 62); Tallinn, Estonia
- Education: Tallinn State Applied Art Institute of the ESSR
- Occupation: Artist
- Father: Raoul Kernumees

Maret Kernumees (until 1936 Maret Kirnmann; July 20, 1934 – March 12, 1997) was an Estonian artist.

== Early life and education ==
Maret Kernumees was born in Tallinn, Estonia, the daughter of the artist Raoul Kernumees and Liidia Kernumees (née Kivikas, 1913–1985). She studied at Kehra Secondary School from 1942 to 1952 and graduated from Tallinn Middle School No. 7 (now Tallinn English College) in 1953. She started studying at the Russian State Library in Moscow in 1953, and in 1954 she enrolled at the Tallinn State Applied Art Institute of the ESSR, where she graduated in 1960 as a graphic artist for books.

== Career ==
From 1960 to 1967, Kernumees worked as a technical editor and illustrator for the newspaper Säde. She illustrated numerous children's books, including the Estonian translation of J. R. R. Tolkien's The Hobbit. She also created watercolor paintings of romantic landscapes. She became a member of the Estonian Artists' Association in 1967.
