= Kursi, Jõgeva County =

Village in Estonia

Kursi
- Village
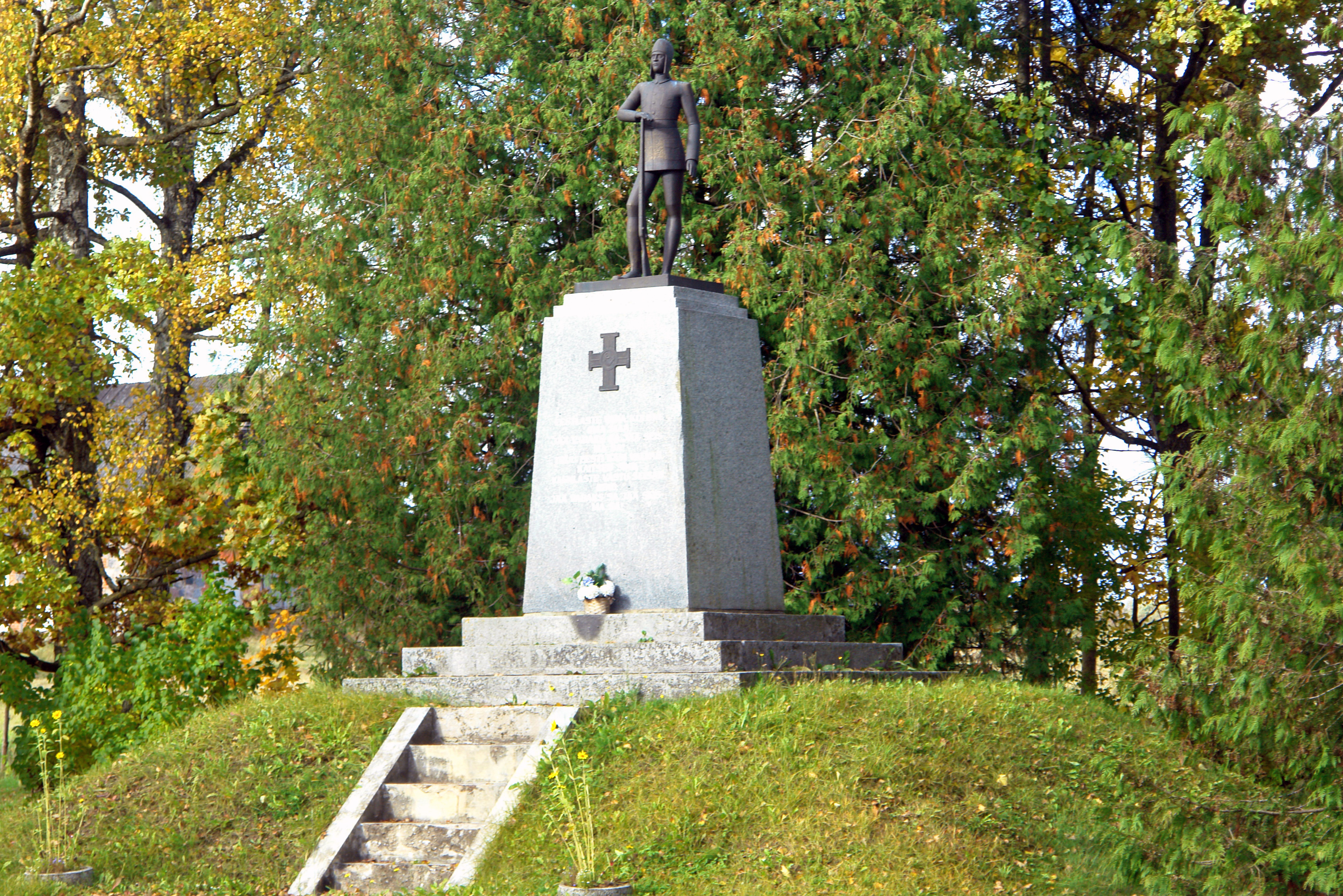
- War of Independence memorial

- Location in Estonia
- Coordinates: 58°35′33″N 26°20′30″E
- Country: Estonia
- County: Jõgeva County
- Municipality: Põltsamaa Parish

Population (10.04.2006)
  - Total: 54

Kursi is a village in Põltsamaa Parish, Jõgeva County in Estonia. It's located about 4 km (2 mi) northeast of Puurmani, by the Pedja River. Kursi has a population of 54 (as of 10 April 2006).

Kursi Church is a mixture of Baroque architecture and Gothic Revival architecture. It derives its present look due to alterations made by architect Johann Gottfired Mühlhausen.

== Gallery ==
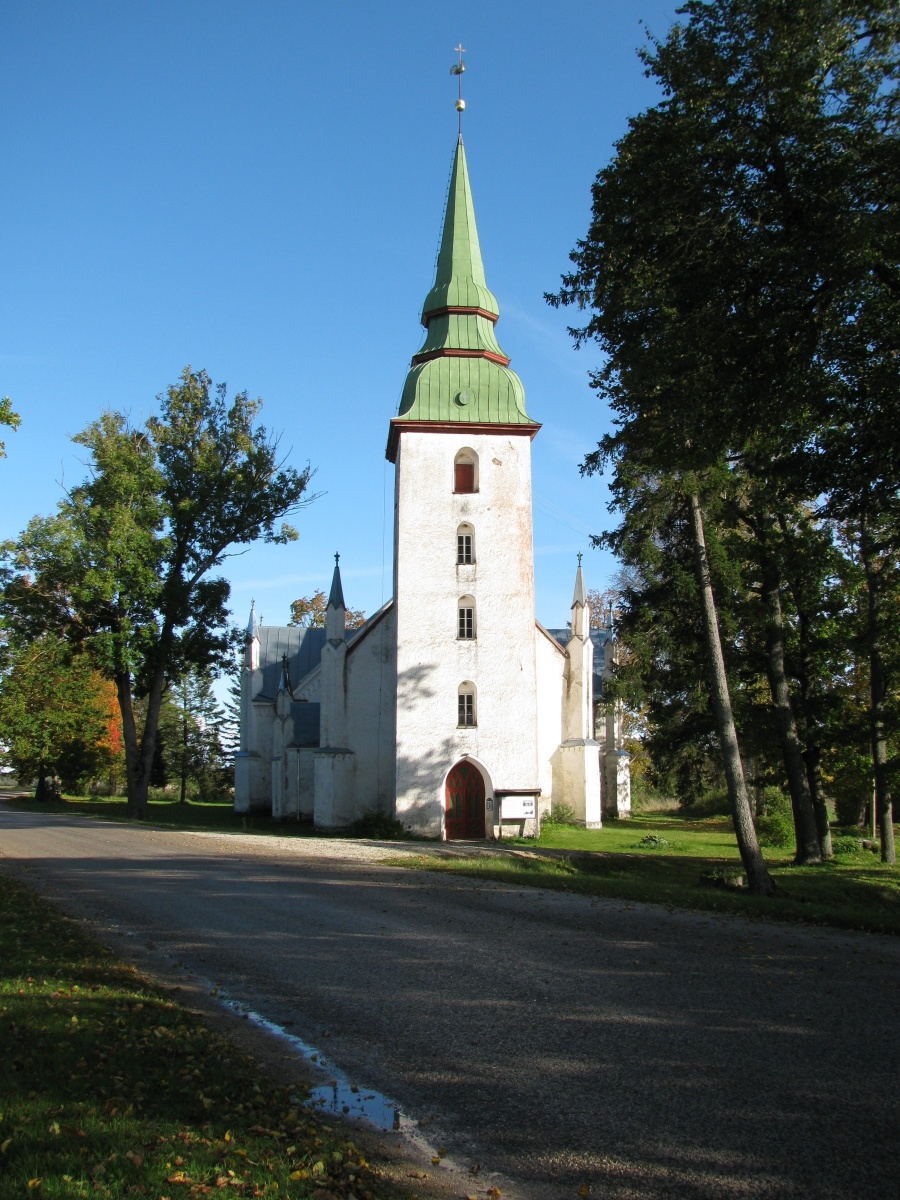
Kursi church

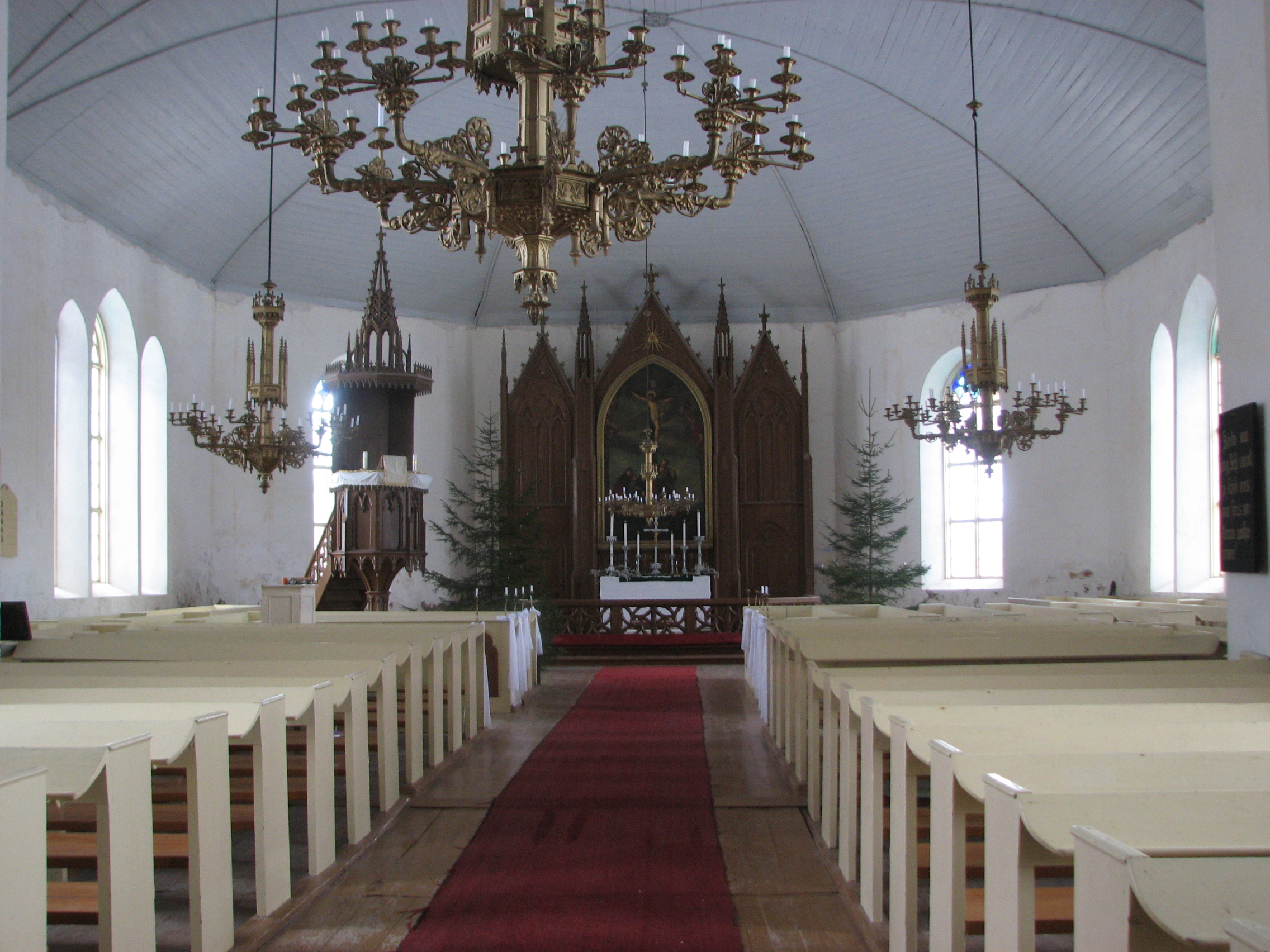
