= Jaan Kiivit Sr. =

Estonian theologian (1906-1971)

The Most Reverend Jaan Kiivit Sr.
- Archbishop of Tallinn; Primate of the Estonian Evangelical Lutheran Church
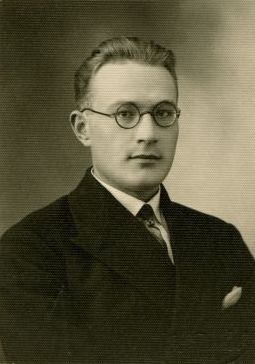
- Church: Estonian Evangelical Lutheran Church
- Archdiocese: Tallinn
- Elected: 2 February 1949
- In office: 1949–1967
- Successor: Alfred Tooming

Orders
- Ordination: 16 July 1933

Personal details
- Born: 27 February 1906 Tuhalaane, Governorate of Livonia, Russian Empire
- Died: August 3, 1971 (aged 65) Tallinn, Estonia
- Buried: Rahumäe cemetery
- Denomination: Lutheran
- Parents: Jaan Kiivit & Leena Allik
- Spouse: Gertrud Varik
- Children: 5, including Jaan Kiivit Jr.

Jaan Kiivit Senior (27 February 1906 – 3 August 1971) was an Estonian prelate who was the Archbishop of Tallinn and the first primate of the Estonian Evangelical Lutheran Church from 1949 and 1967, after the break away from the exiled Estonian Evangelium's Lutheran Church.

== Biography ==
Kiivit was born in Tuhalaane, Viljandi County on 27 February 1906 in the Governorate of Livonia. His father Jaan Kiivit and his mother Leena Allik were millers. From autumn 1925 to December 1932 he studied at the Faculty of Theology of the University of Tartu. He was ordained priest on 16 July 1933 by Archbishop Jakob Kukk. In April 1933 he became a vicar in Jõhvi and in July 1933 he became a pastor in Emmaste, on the island of Hiiumaa. In 1940 he was elected Dean of the Viru deanery and became acting dean. On 15 January 1941 he became was confirmed as Dean, a title which he could not have before due to his young age. On 6 June 1948, he became pastor of St. John's Church, Tallinn and Dean of Tallinn. In that period he also acted as a substitute for the Archbishop, who had moved into exile in Sweden in 1944.

== Archbishop ==
On 2 February 1949, he was appointed Bishop of Tallinn and Primate of the Estonian Church. On 20 April 1949 he was elected and confirmed by the Constituent Assembly as Deputy Bishop. On 23 October 1949, the Church Council of the EELC chose Kiivit as the first Archbishop of EELC, a post to hold for life. As archbishop, he was closely involved with ecumenism. In 1958 he participated in the first meetings of the Christian Peace Conference in Prague. He was later elected to the board of the CVC. In 1959 he participated in the festivities of the 550th anniversary of the University of Leipzig (renamed Karl-Marx University during the communist rule) in the German Democratic Republic and obtained an honorary doctorate. On 31 August 1967 Kiivit resigned from the post of archbishop due to poor health, but also because of increasing distance from the state authorities. He died on 3 August 1971. His son Jaan Kiivit Jr. succeeded as Archbishop some years later.

== Agent for the KGB ==
KGB archives opened after the collapse of the Soviet Union showed that Kiivit an NKVD/KGB agent who was first recruited in 1948. His code name was Jüri I.

Titles in Lutheranism
Preceded by Johan Kõpp	Archbishop of Tallinn and Primate of the Estonian Evangelical Lutheran Church; 1949–1967	Succeeded by Alfred Tooming
