= Karksi =

Village in Estonia

- Village
- Location in Estonia
- Coordinates: 58°7′2″N 25°35′16″E
- Country: Estonia
- County: Viljandi County
- Municipality: Mulgi Parish

Population (2011 Census)
  - Total: 191
- Time zone: UTC+2 (EET)
  - Summer (DST): UTC+3 (EEST)
- Website: karksi.ee

Karksi (German: Karkus) is a village in Mulgi Parish in Viljandi County in southern Estonia. It is located near the town of Karksi-Nuia.

== See also ==
- Battle of Karksi (1600)
