= St Peter's Church, Tartu =

Church building in Tartu, Estonia

St Peter's Church
- The Parish Church of Saint Peter
- Estonian: Tartu Peetri kirik
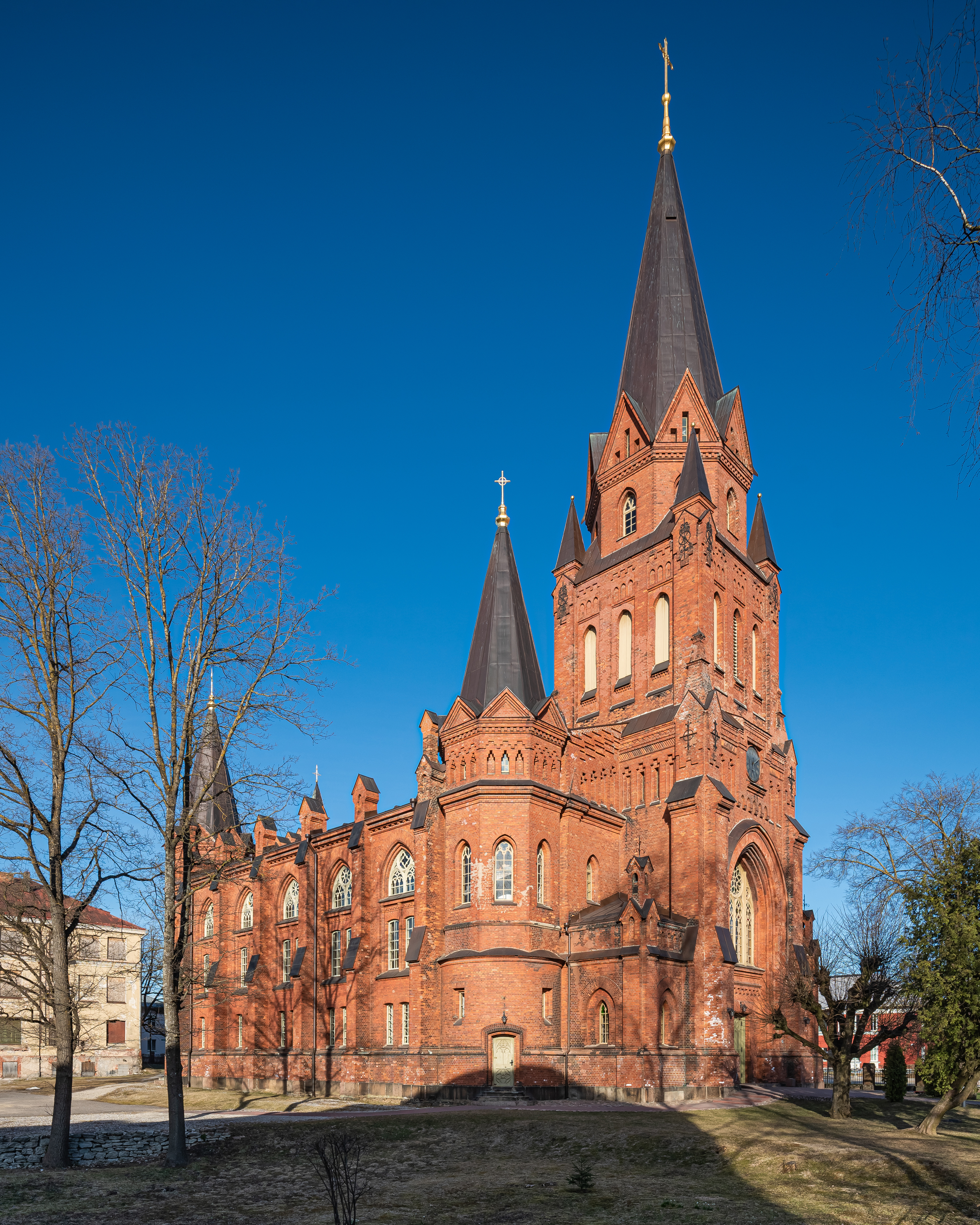
- St Peter's Church
- 58.390342°N 26.728616°E
- Location: Tartu, Tartu County
- Country: Estonia
- Denomination: Lutheran
- Website: eelk.ee/tartu.peetri

History
- Status: Parish church
- Founded: October 22, 1869 (Parish)
- Dedication: Saint Peter
- Consecrated: 16 September 1884

Architecture
- Functional status: Active
- Heritage designation: Cultural heritage of Estonia
- Architect: Viktor Schröter
- Architectural type: Church
- Style: Neo-Gothic
- Years built: 1883–1884
- Groundbreaking: 31 May 1883
- Completed: 1884
- Construction cost: ₽110,000

Specifications
- Materials: Brick

Administration
- Diocese: Southern Region
- Parish: St Peter's in Tartu

Clergy
- Archbishop: Urmas Viilma
- Bishop: Joel Luhamets

St Peter's Church (Estonian: Tartu Peetri kirik, German: Petrikirche) is a 19th-century church of the Estonian Evangelical Lutheran Church located in Tartu, Estonia.

== St Peter's Parish ==
The parish separated from St Mary's parish on 27 October 1869. The congregation used St. John's Church until the new church was built.

== Church building ==
The cornerstone of St Peter's Church was laid on 31 May 1883. The Neo-Gothic church was built between 1883 and 1884 on a design by architect Viktor Schröter. It was consecrated on 16 September 1884, and finally completed in 1903, when the church's western tower was completed, a design by Georg Hellat. The cost of building the church was 110,000 rubles, and most of the money was raised through donations.

== Interior ==
The interior of the church is also predominantly Neo-Gothic. The interior features a remarkable altarpiece dating from 1900, the work of Gustav Beermann; an altar painting titled Kutsuv Kristus (The Calling Christ) dating from 1897, the work of Johann Köler; the paintings Ketsemani aed (The Garden of Gethsemane) and Colgata (Calvary) for the wing decorations of the altar dating from 1925, the work of Arnold Vihvelin; and an organ with 22 pipes made in 1891 by Wilhelm Müllverstedt.

== Soviet times ==
In 1948, after St Mary's parish lost their church property, St Peter's was also used by St Mary's congregation as their parish church, which remained in place until 1997. Church membership also declined drastically by the 1980s due to the Soviet state's repression of Christianity, from 22,378 in 1912 to 483 in 1985. Membership started to increase again during the late 1980 and early 1990s, in the last few years of the Soviet Union, however.

== Gallery ==
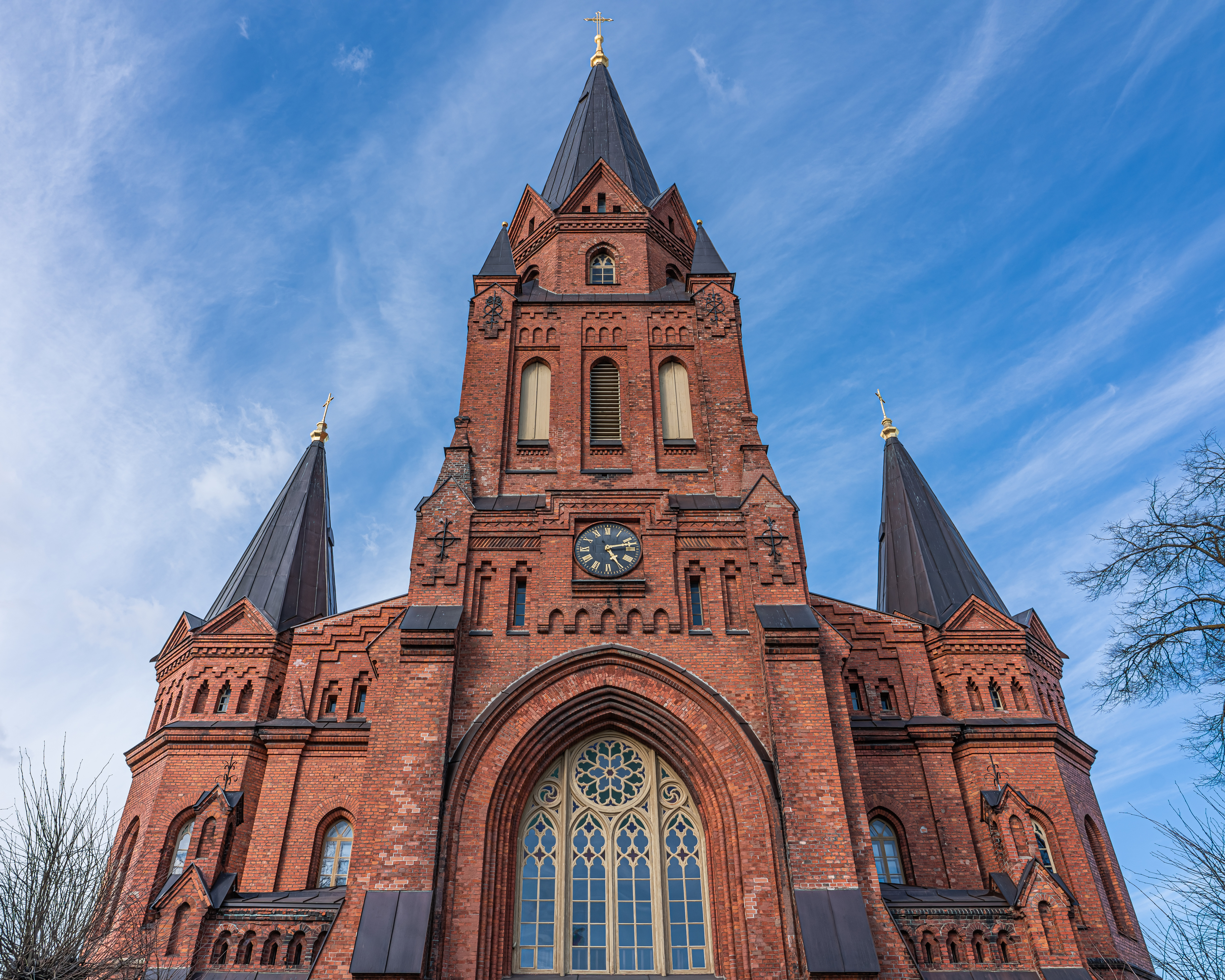
Church tower

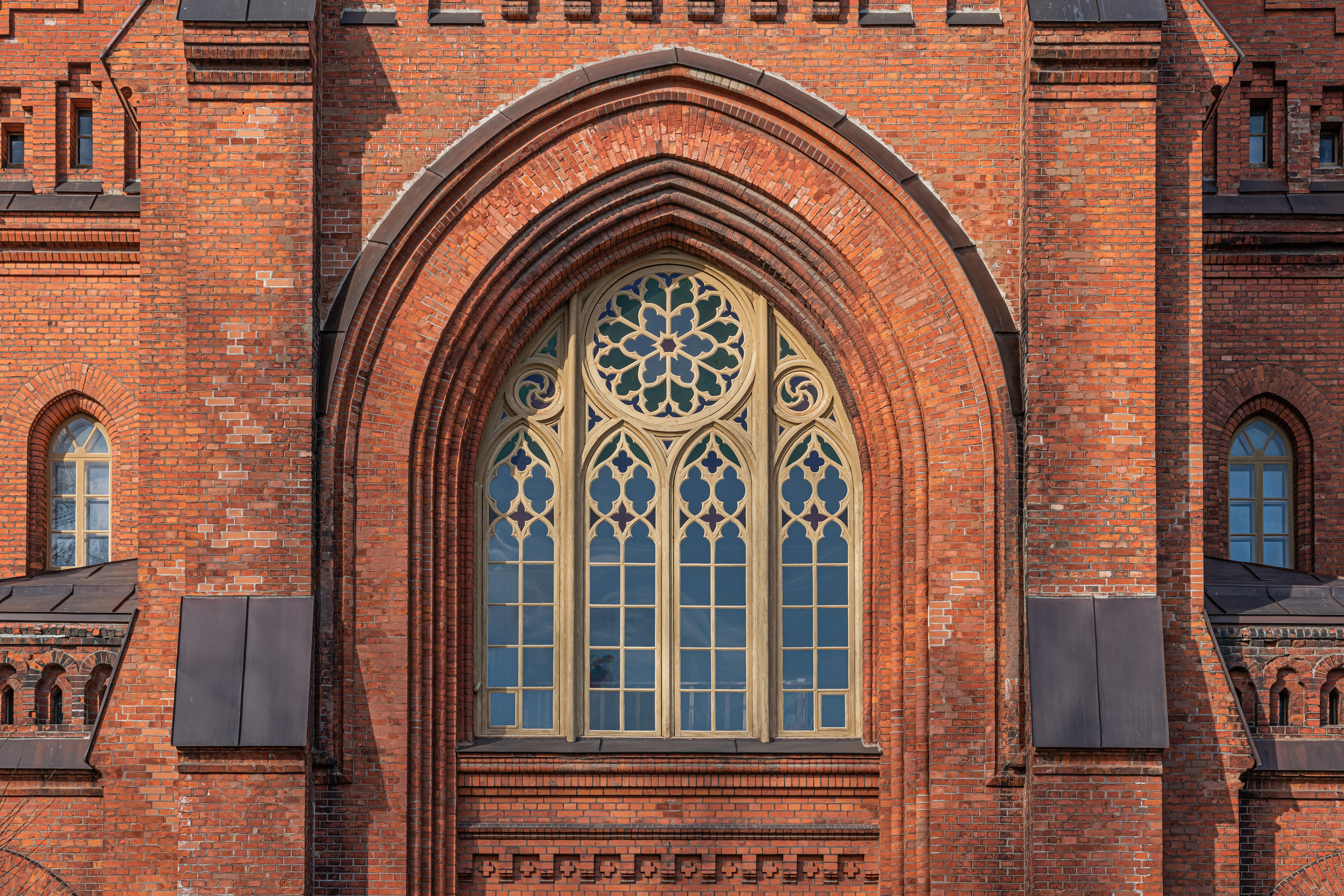
Window detail

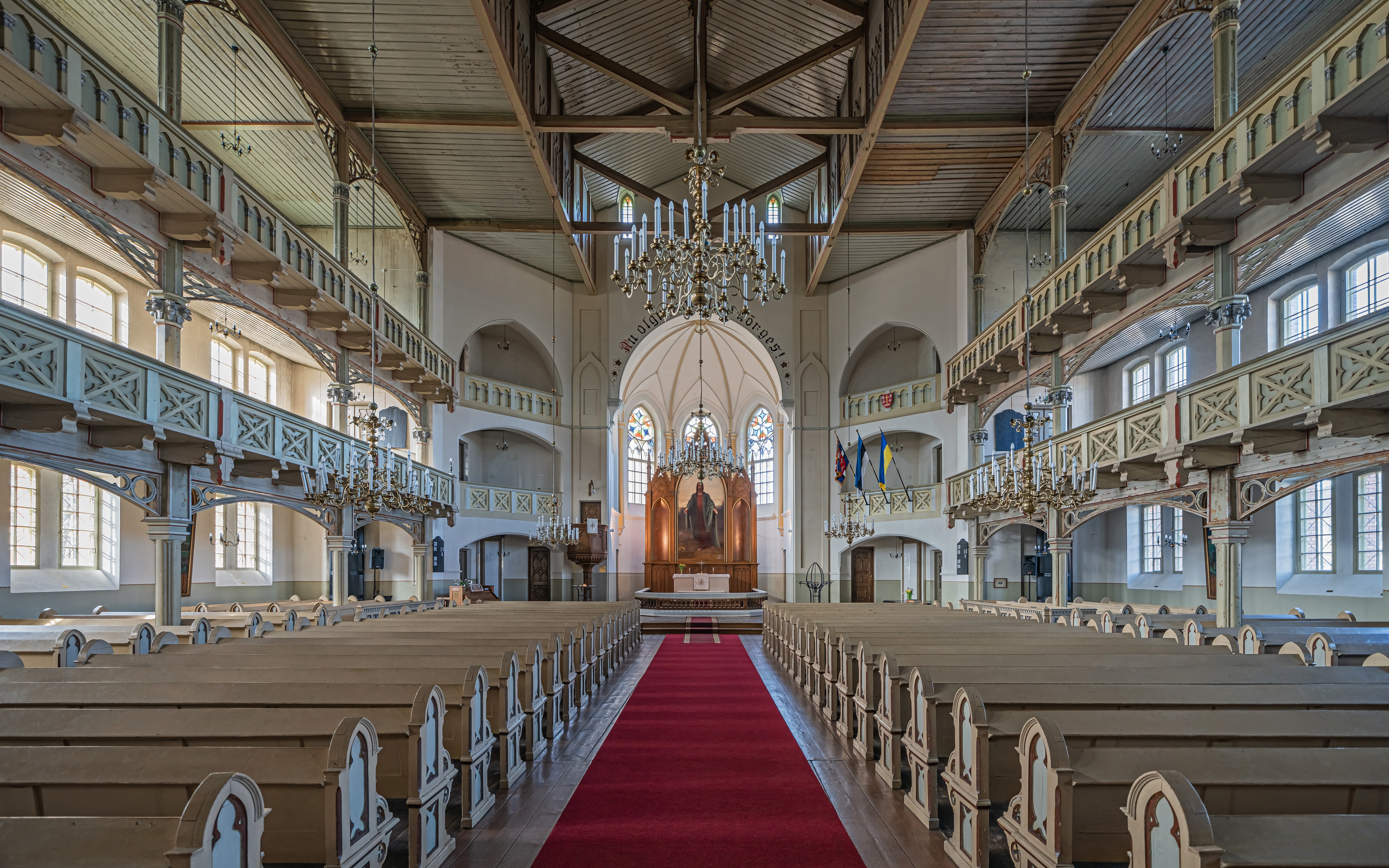
Interior view

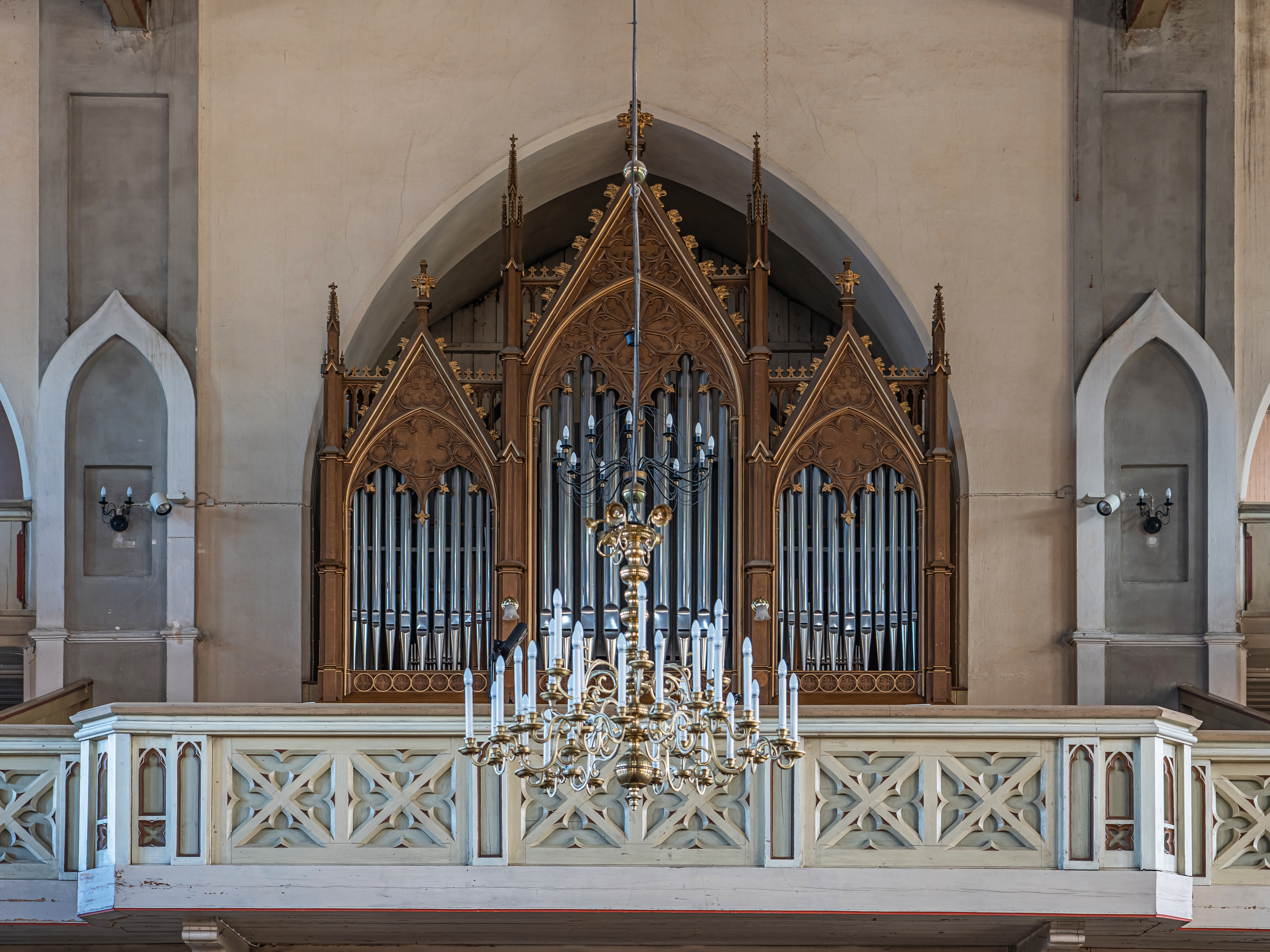
Organ

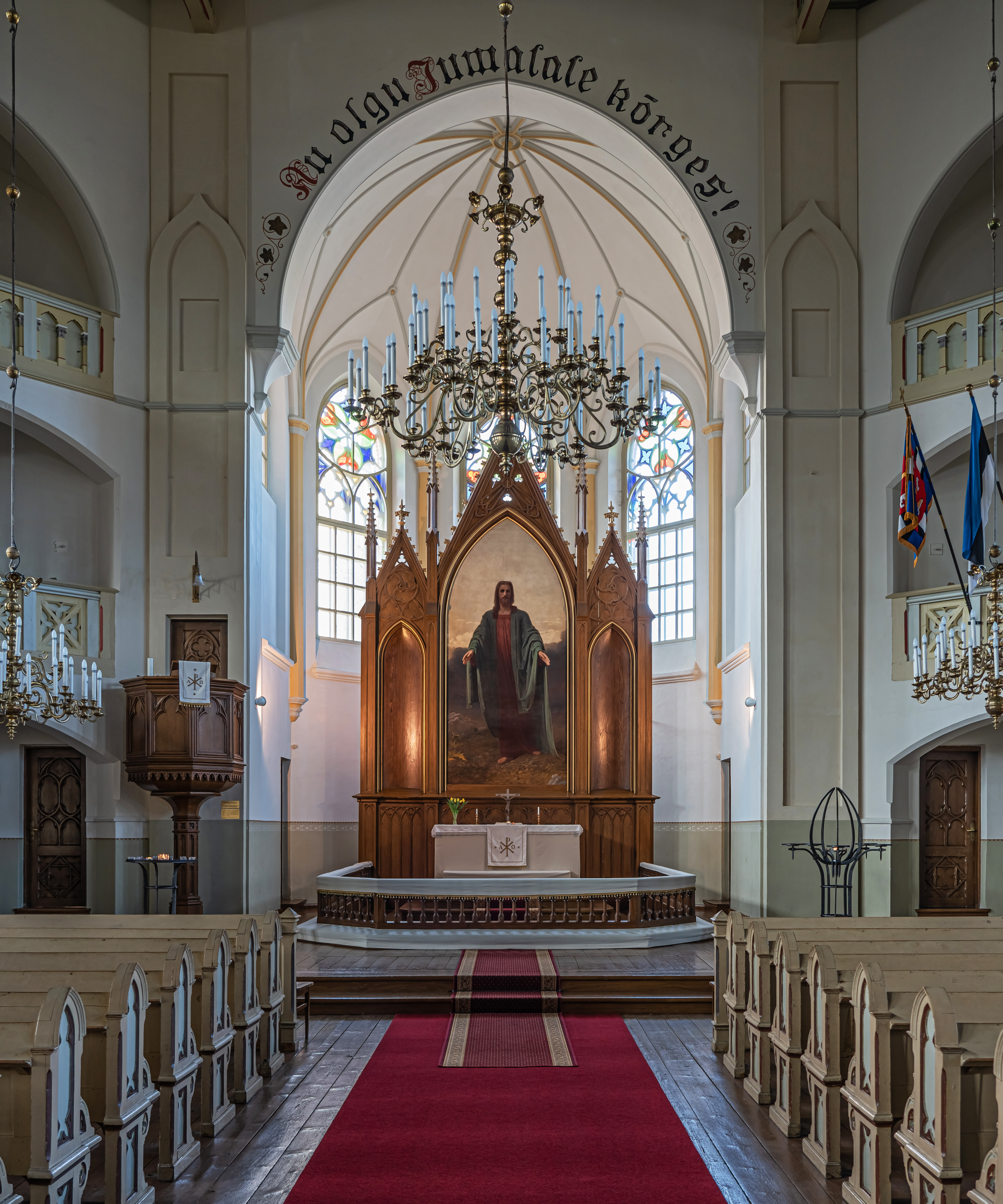
Altar

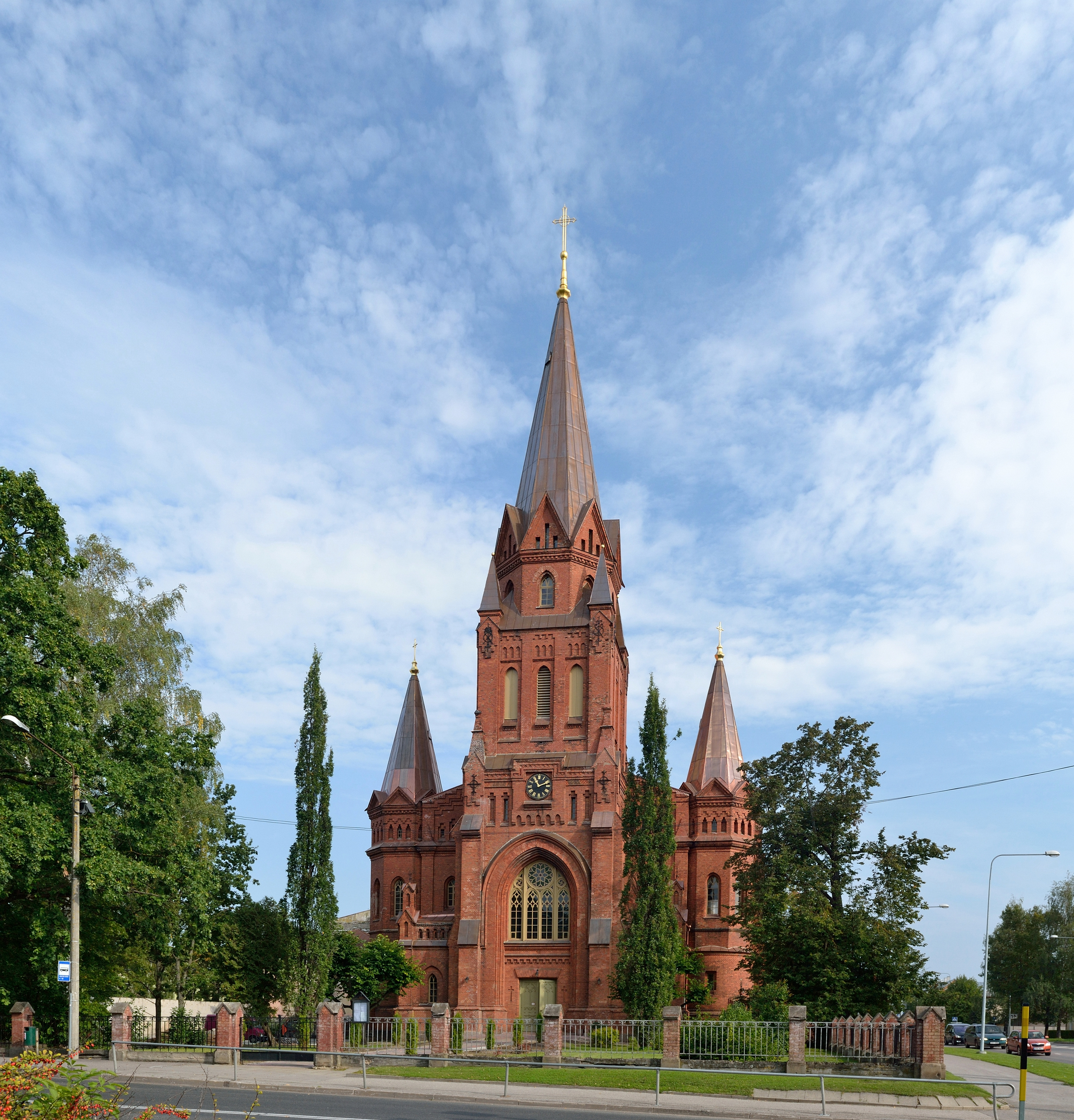
The church in 2012
