= St Mary's Church, Tartu =

Church in Estonia

St Mary's Church
- The Parish Church of Saint Mary
- Tartu Maarja kirik
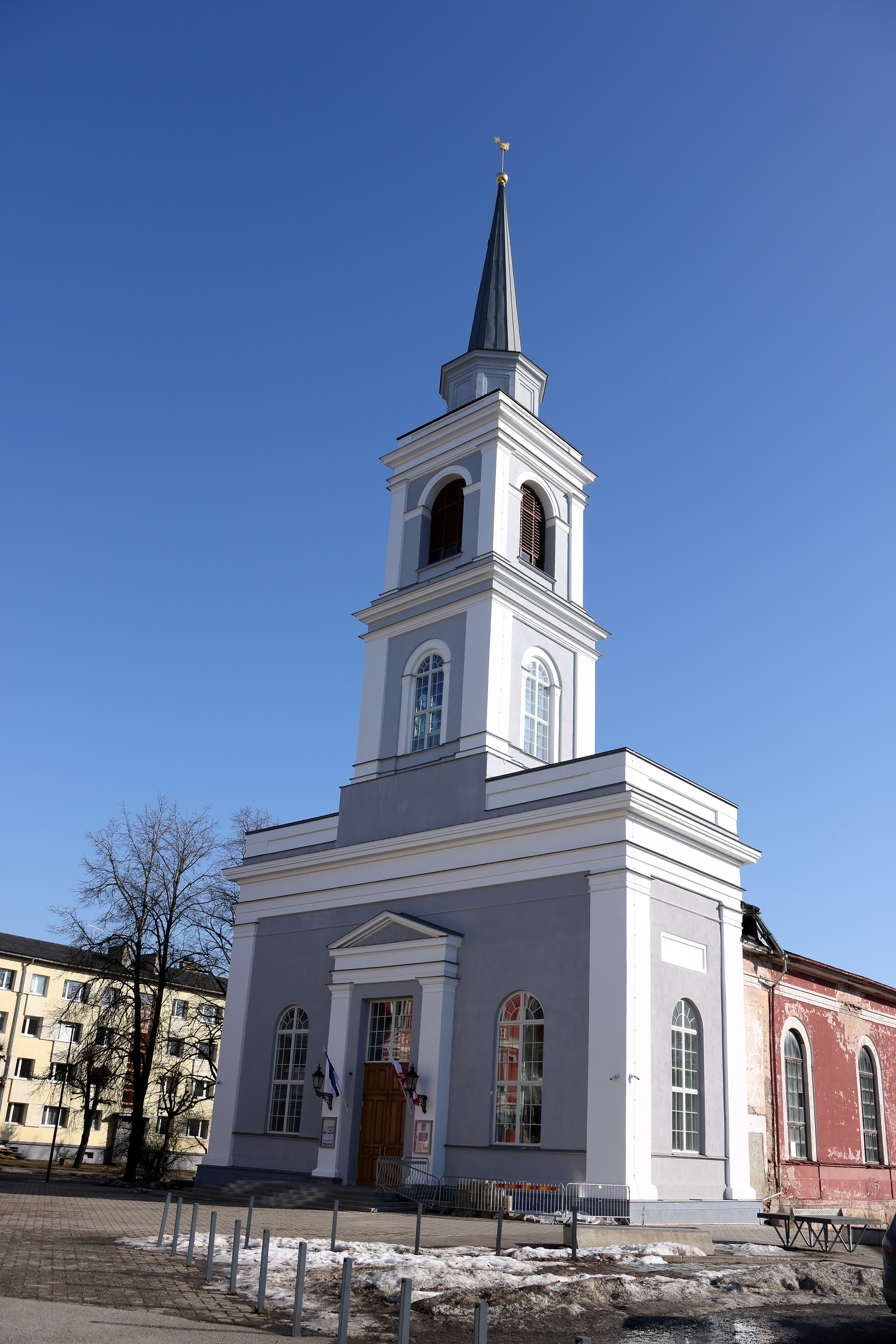
- The church in 2024
- St Mary's Church
- 58.376398°N 26.716740°E
- Location: Tartu
- Country: Estonia
- Denomination: Estonian Evangelical Lutheran Church
- Website: Website of the church

History
- Status: Parish church
- Dedication: Virgin Mary
- Consecrated: January 11, 1842

Architecture
- Functional status: Active
- Style: Neoclassical
- Years built: 1838–1841
- Groundbreaking: 1837
- Completed: 1841

Administration
- Diocese: Southern Region
- Parish: St Mary's in Tartu

Clergy
- Archbishop: Urmas Viilma
- Bishop: Joel Luhamets
- Vicar: Timo Švedko

St Mary's Church (Estonian: Tartu Maarja kirik) is a 19th century church of the Estonian Evangelical Lutheran Church located in Tartu, Estonia.

== Formation of the parish ==
The original St Mary's parish was founded on 15 August 1224. The present parish was formed after the two Tartu parishes, the German speaking and Estonian speaking congregations, united to form the parish of Tartu in 1833. Since the Parish Church of St John was too small to accommodate the large congregation, it was decided that a new church be built to serve the Estonian speaking members of the parish, while St John's would be used by the German speaking members.

== Church building ==
A previous church dedicated to St Mary was demolished in 1704 and remained in ruins for another 100 years until it was fully demolished to make way for the main building of the University of Tartu. The new St Mary's was built between 1837 and 1841 in the classicist style on plans made by G. F. W. Geist. Works took longer than expected because the steeple collapsed and had to be rebuilt. The church was consecrated on January 11, 1842.

In 1862, the church underwent major repairs and alterations. New clocks and a new pulpit were also installed. In 1889 a new altar painting was commissioned for the church by Julie Emilie Wilhelmine Hagen-Schwarz, a well-known Baltic German artist based in Tartu. The painting depicted Christ on the cross and under the cross Mary, John, and Mary Magdalene. Above the picture was an inscription from scripture which said Nida om Jumal ma ilma armastanu (For God so loved the world) (John 3:16). In 1890 a new organ was built by the famous organ company Sauer. Central heating was installed in the church in the 1930s. The church also had a museum which contained old church-related items, books and documents.

== WWII destruction ==
During World War II, on July 12, 1941, Soviet forces bombed Tartu. Several hundred buildings were destroyed in the fire, including St Mary's Church. The church museum and other valuable archives were lost. Only the walls of the church and the big bell, which was moved to the Paistu church tower in 1948, survived the bombing.

== Soviet occupation ==
After World War II, the occupying Soviets denied the congregation access to the church or permission to restore the building. In 1956, the Tartu city authorities gave the ruins of the church building to the Estonian Agricultural Academy and a gym was built instead, designed by I. Kalmet. The two remaining stone floors of the tower were demolished.

In the tower zone, the walls were also demolished to the same height as the church walls, and the four massive feet of the tower were demolished to the foundation. According to modern recollections, students were used in the demolition work. A two-storey building adjacent to the main facade of the church building was constructed, with smaller exercise rooms, laundry rooms, classrooms and a boiler room. The sports complex was completed in 1961.

Between 1941 and 1948, the congregation used St John's Church and the Tartu University Church, but then moved into St Peter's Church in 1948 where it remained till 1997. In December 1997, a church hall was erected in the former camp hall, which was consecrated at the beginning of Advent and was used as a worship room. The church hall was intended to be used as a temporary solution until its church was returned and restored. Due to the delay in the return of the church, the parish church hall remained the site of worship services for 13 years.

== Return ==
In December 2008, the church was returned to the Estonian Evangelical Lutheran Church, but the actual transfer of the premises to the congregation took place only after the university's new gym was completed on August 15, 2009. The congregation provided essential equipment and converted the former gym into a temporary church space. As such, the church could be used for services, church concerts and other appropriate purposes until the restoration project is completed and re-construction begins. The church towers rebuilding began in 2021. As of February 2022, the church bell tower was being reconstructed. The a steeple and gilded rooster shaped weather vane were added back in 6th June, 2022. On the 81 year anniversary of the churches destruction, the church bells rang again for the first time since 1941. On the 29th February, 2024, the church was consecrated by archbishop Urmas Viilma, Estonian president Alar Karis was also present at the consecration. It is being planned to renovate the roof and roof constructions of the church next.

== Gallery ==
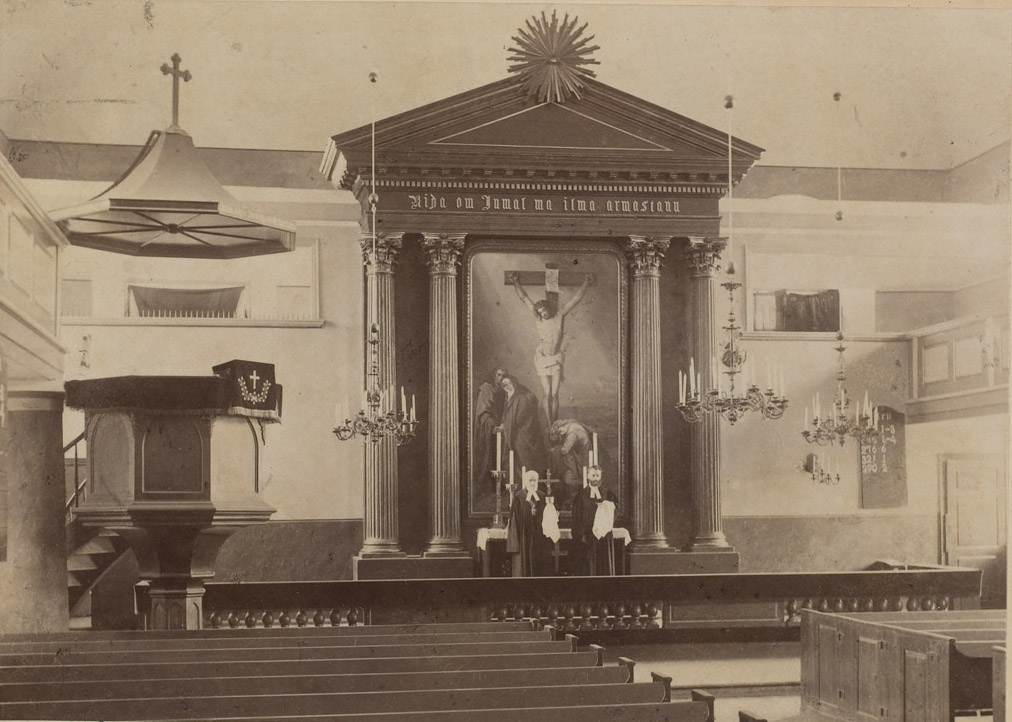
View of the altar before 1941

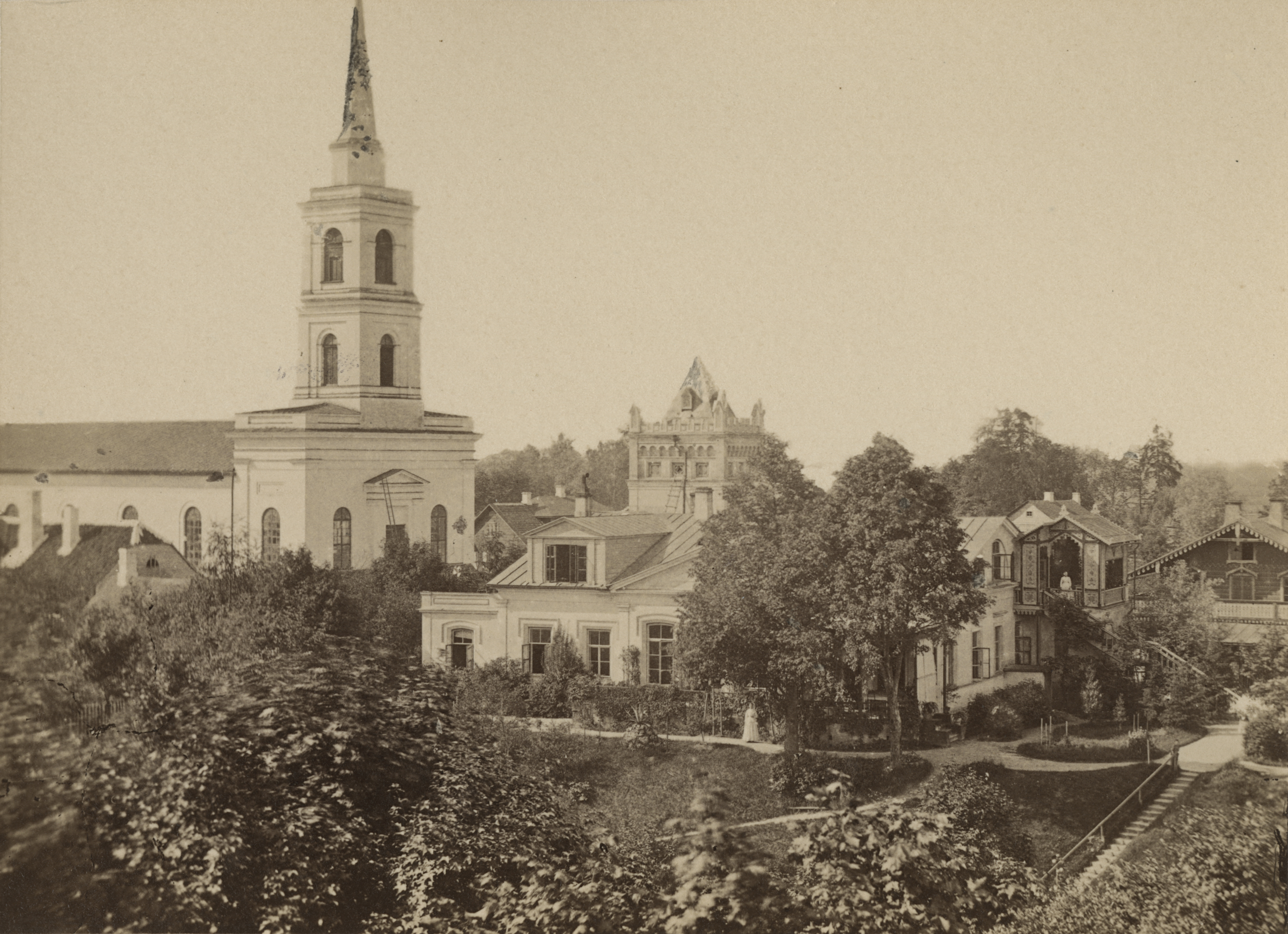
The church prior to 1941

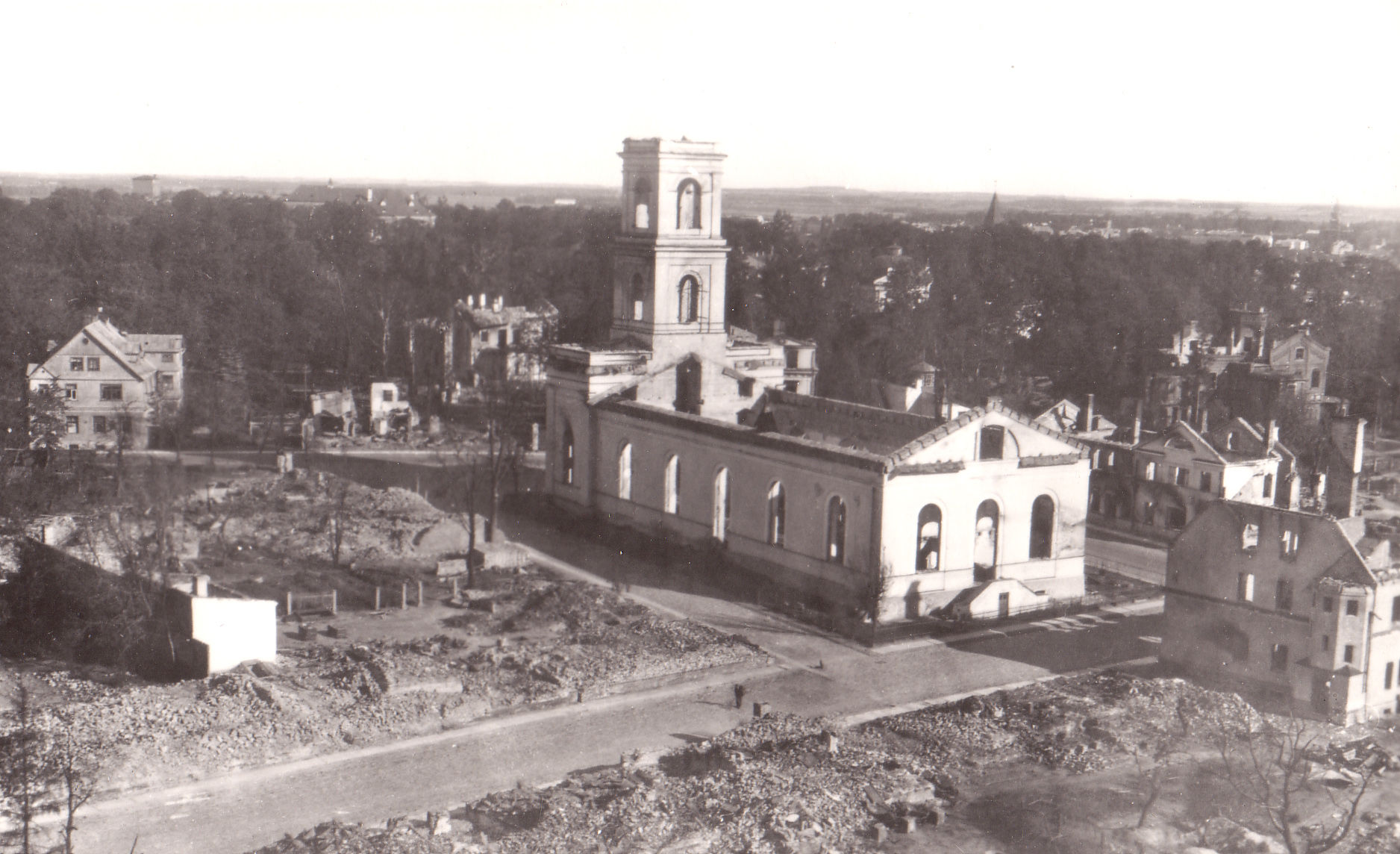
The ruins in 1941

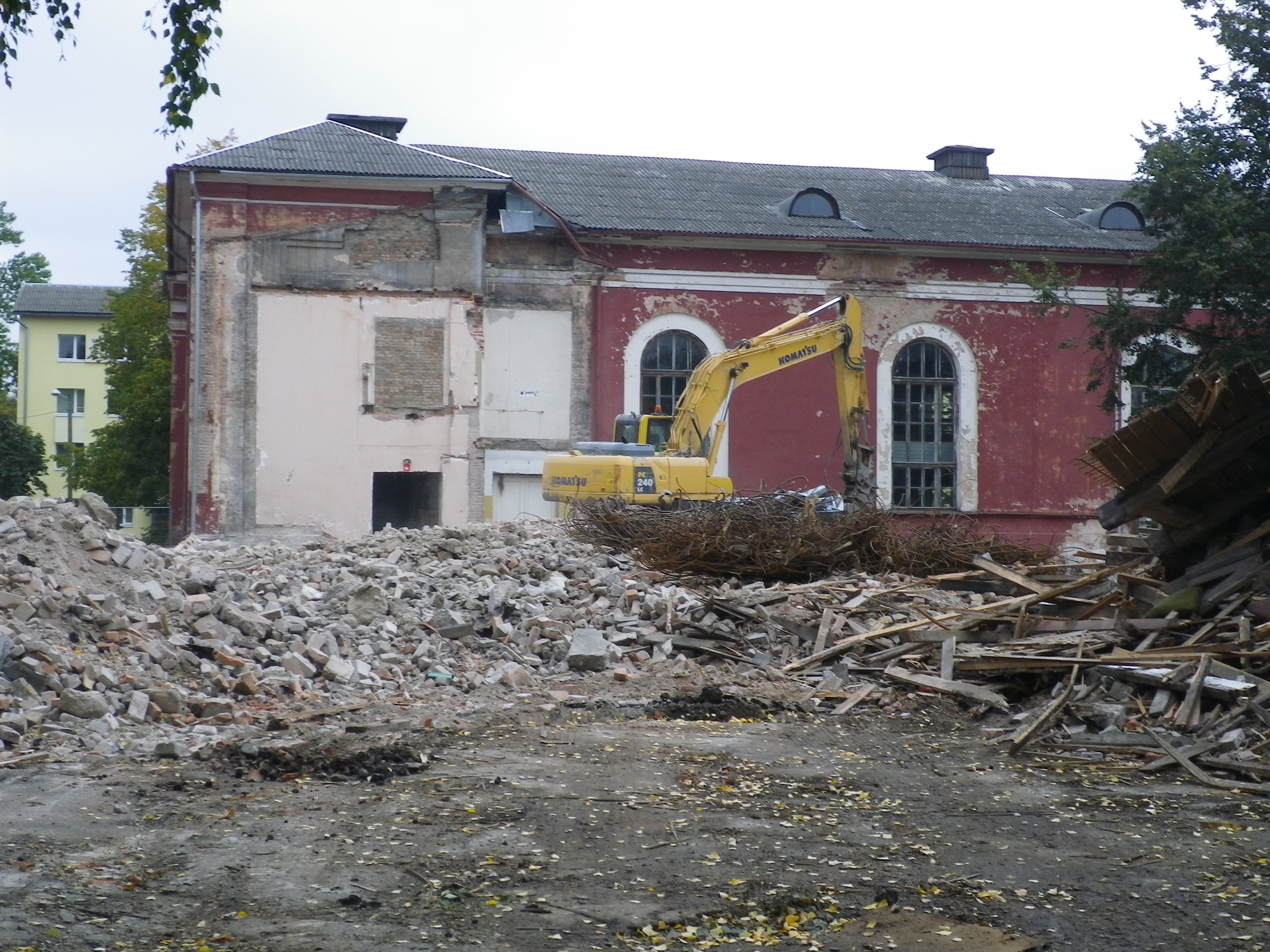
Demolition of the adjacent extension (2011)

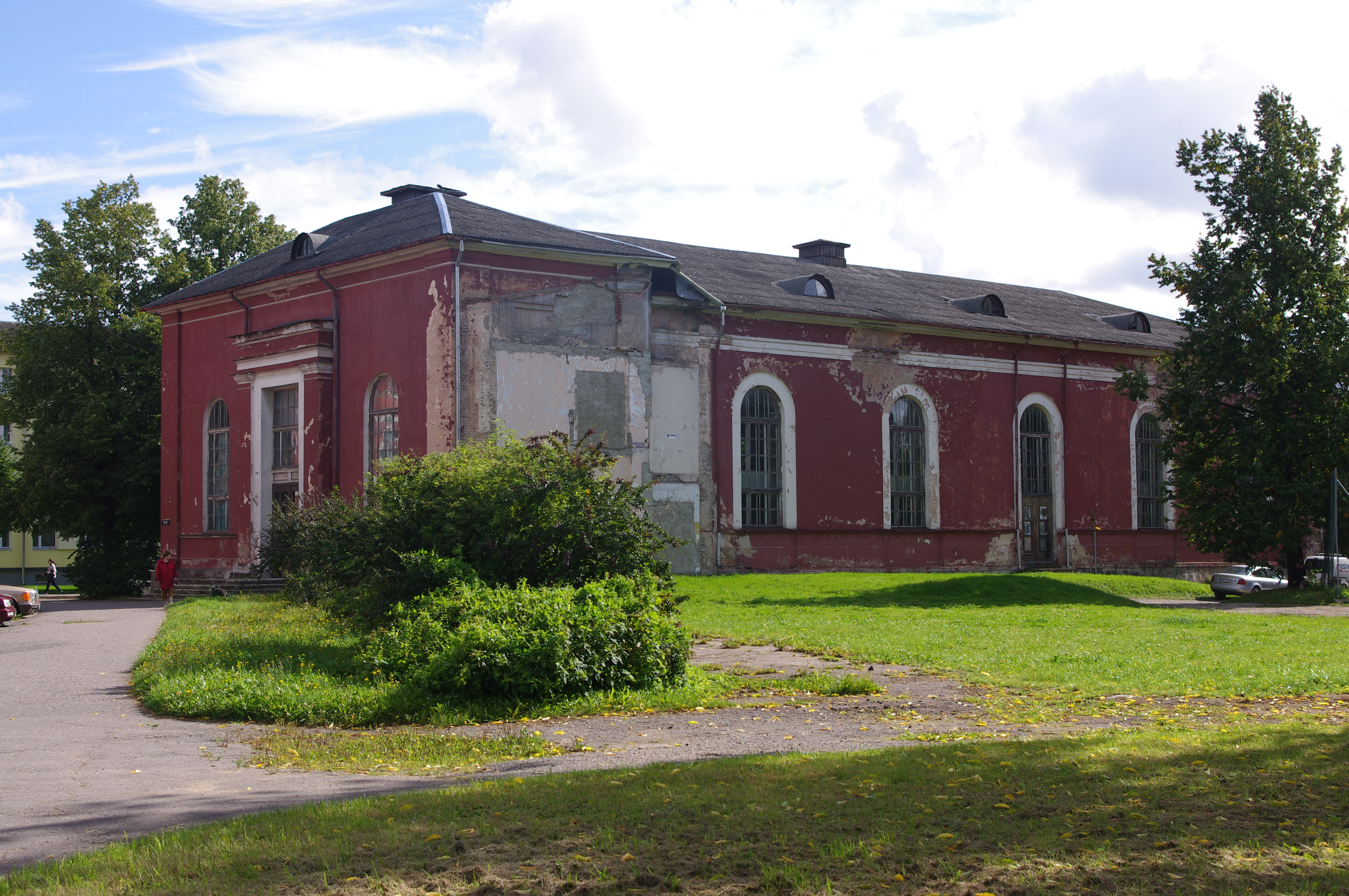
The church in 2012
