= Gustav Rutopõld =

Estonian clergyman and academic

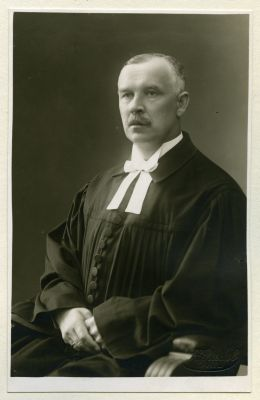
- Born: December 3, 1875
- Died: January 7, 1939 (aged 63)
- Education: University of Tartu
- Church: Estonian Evangelical Lutheran Church

Gustav Rutopõld (December 3, 1875 in Nabala Parish, Harju County – January 7, 1936 in Tartu) was an Estonian Evangelical Lutheran Church clergyman and academic.

He studied at the Tallinn Kreisschool. In 1918 he graduated from Rakvere Gymnasium as an external student. In the same year he entered the Faculty of Theology at the University of Tartu, which he graduated in 1922. He was also a member of the Estonian Students' Society.
