= Hugo Bernhard Rahamägi =

Estonian politician and Archbishop

The Most Reverend Hugo Bernhard Rahamägi
- Bishop of Tallinn; Primate of the Estonian Evangelical Lutheran Church
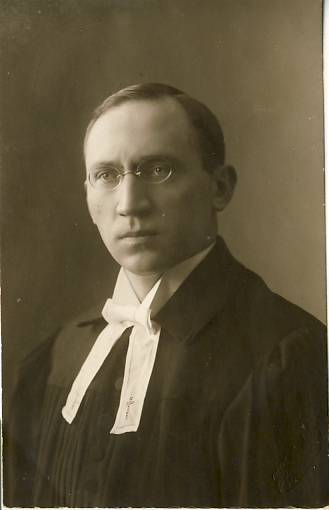
- Church: Estonian Evangelical Lutheran Church
- Archdiocese: Tallinn
- Elected: 19 June 1934
- Predecessor: Jakob Kukk
- Successor: Johan Kõpp

Orders
- Ordination: 16 April 1914
- Consecration: 16 September 1934 by Erling Eidem

Personal details
- Born: 2 June 1886 Kurtna, Harju County, Russian Empire (Present-day Estonia)
- Died: 1 September 1941 (aged 55) Kirov, Kirov Oblast, Russia, Soviet Union
- Denomination: Lutheran
- Parents: Mart Rahhamäggi & Louise Amalie Drellneck
- Spouse: Edith Hendrikson; Melanie Kuljus

Hugo Bernhard Rahamägi (2 June 1886 – 1 September 1941) was a prominent Estonian prelate and politician who served as Minister for Education in the Estonian government between 1924 and 1925 and later as Bishop of Tallinn and Primate of the Estonian Evangelical Lutheran Church from 1934 till 1939.

== Early life and education ==
Rahamägi was born on 2 June 1886 in Kurtna, Harju County in the Russian Empire, what is now present-day Estonia. He attended the Jõgisoo Rural Municipality School between 1893 and 1895 and then the Keila Parish School from 1895 till 1905. He also studied at the University of Tartu from 106 till 1913 and graduated in theology in 1913. He earned his doctorate in 1920 from the University of Berlin while he defended his dissertation titled 1924 The Reasons for the Decrease of the Fertility of the Estonian People and the Way to Eliminate It.

== Ordination and career ==
Rahamägi was ordained priest on 16 April 1914 in St. Mary's Cathedral, Tallinn. He was appointed as vicar of the Church of the Holy Spirit, Tallinn. He also served the congregations in Kaarma, Kuressaare from 1914 till 1920. In 1920 he became associate professor of Systematic Theology at the Faculty of Theology of the University of Tartu and in 1921 he became acting professor. Between 1922 and 1924 he also served as head of the faculty of Theology. He was appointed to serve as Minister for Education of Estonia in 1924 and retained the post till 1925. In 1926 he became Professor of Systematic Theology at the Faculty of Theology.

== Episcopacy ==
On 19 June 1934 Rahamägi was elected Bishop of Tallinn and Primate of the Church with 226 votes in favour and 131 votes against. He was consecrated 16 September 1934 by the Archbishop of Uppsala, Erling Eidem. In 1938 he became a member of the Riiginõukogu or State Council. He also worked to further the establishment of the Estonian Evangelical Lutheran Church.

== Arrest and Execution ==
Rahamägi was arrested by Soviet troops on 26 April 1941 and accused of abusing his powers to expand the church's influence on the Soviet state (Article 58-13 and 58-2 of the RSFSR Penal Code: "armed uprising or intervention with the goal to seize the power and Active struggle against revolutionary movement of tsarist personnel and members of "counter-revolutionary governments" during the civil war). He was taken to Russia where he was executed in Kirov, Kirov Oblast on 1 September 1941.

| Preceded by Jakob Kukk | Archbishop of Tallinn; Primate of the Estonian Evangelical Lutheran Church; 1934–1939 | Succeeded by Johan Kõpp |
