= Joel Luhamets =

Estonian Lutheran prelate (born 1952)

The Right Reverend Joel Luhamets
- Bishop of the Southern Region
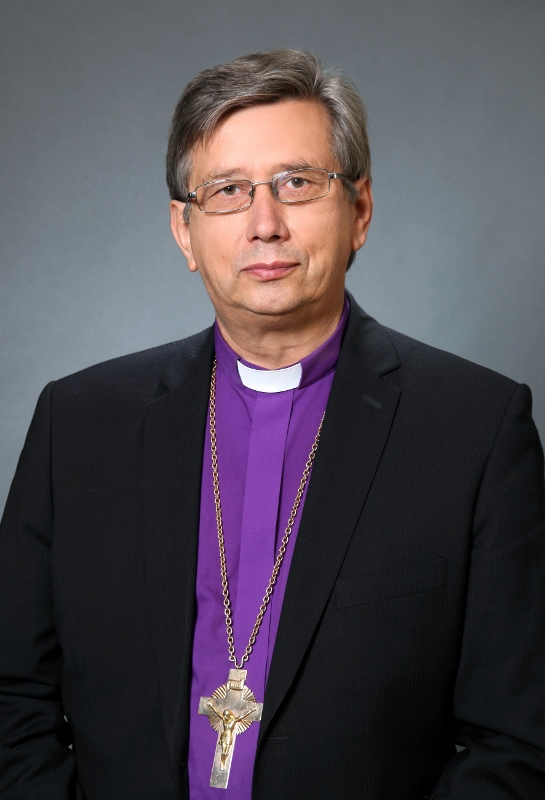
- Church: Estonian Evangelical Lutheran Church
- Diocese: Southern Region
- Elected: 13 January 2015
- In office: 2015–2024

Orders
- Ordination: 6 September 1978
- Consecration: 23 April 2015 by Urmas Viilma

Personal details
- Born: 19 March 1952 (age 74) Antsla, Estonia
- Denomination: Lutheran
- Parents: Aleksander Luhamets & Meeta Miralda Siider
- Spouse: Tiina Luhamets
- Children: 3

Joel Luhamets (born 19 March 1952) is an Estonian Lutheran prelate who is the current bishop of the Southern Region whose seat is in Tartu, Estonia.

== Early life and education ==
Luhamets was born on 19 March 1952 in Antsla, southern Estonia to the Reverend Aleksander Luhamets and Meeta Miralda Luhamets (née Siider). After graduating from Antsla Secondary School in 1970, he started studying at the Tallinn Polytechnic Institute's Department of Engineering. He graduated as an Electrical Engineer in 1975. Between 1975 and 1977, he worked as an Electrical Engineer in Märjamaa.

== Ordained ministry ==
Although he grew up in a religious family where his father was a clergyman, in the fall of 1972 he refrained from involving in any religious aspects. Until then, his life had been closely associated with church and music. Nevertheless, in 1977 he enrolled at the Institute of Theology of the Estonian Evangelical Lutheran Church to study theology from where he graduated on 6 January 1987. He was ordained priest on 6 September 1978. Throughout the years Luhamets has been involved in music, playing the instrument and singing as an integral part of his spiritual work. After ordination, he was assigned as pastor of the congregations in Kuressaare where he till 1989. He later became pastor of Põltsamaa Church and in 1991 became Dean of the Viljandi deanery. In 1997 transferred to Tartu to become pastor of St John's Church and Dean of the Tartu deanery, the latter which he kept till 2015. Between 2000 and 2001 he also served as chaplain at the University of Tartu and from 2000 till 2002 he was responsible of Kambja church. He also served the church in Vara from 2004 till 2005 and the church in Äksi between 2009 and 2010. From 1997 till 2017 he served as pastor of St Paul's Church in Tartu.

== Bishop ==
On 13 January 2015 Luhamets was elected Bishop of the Southern Region with the bishopric seat in Tartu. He was consecrated on 23 April 2015 in St. Mary's Cathedral, Tallinn by Archbishop Urmas Viilma and co-consecrated by Andres Põder Archbishop Emeritus of Tallinn; Einar Soone Bishop Emeritus of the Western and Northern Region; Juha Pihkala Bishop Emeritus of Tampere; Paul Brūvers Bishop of Liepaja; Aarre Kuukauppi of the Evangelical Lutheran Church of Ingria; and Brian Castle Bishop of Tonbridge. He was installed bishop in St Paul's Church, Tartu on May 25.

== Civil life ==
He also was active in the life of Estonian society. Among other things, he was a member of the Estonian Congress, a member of Põltsamaa City Council between 1993 and 1997 and since 1999 a member of Tartu City Council. Joel Luhamets has been a member of the EELC Songbook Committee and is responsible for the restoration of the Estonian Church and two years as the publisher of the Church Book. In 2001 he was awarded the Order of the White Star.

== Family ==
Joel Luhamets is married to Tiina Luhamets. They have three adult children: Kristjan (1980), Katrin (1981) and Eva-Liisa (1983). His son Kristjan Luhamets is also a priest.
