= Johan Kõpp =

Estonian archbishop

The Most Reverend Johan Kõpp
- Bishop of Tallinn; Primate of the Estonian Evangelical Lutheran Church
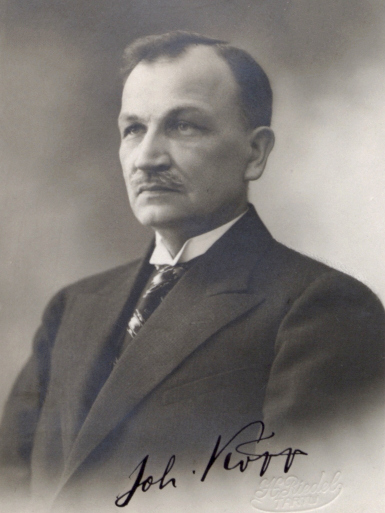
- Johan Kõpp, photo 1920s
- Church: Estonian Evangelical Lutheran Church
- Archdiocese: Tallinn
- Elected: 14 December 1939
- In office: 1939–1944
- Predecessor: Hugo Bernhard Rahamägi
- Successor: Jaan Kiivit Sr.

Orders
- Ordination: 19 September 1909

Personal details
- Born: 9 November 1874 Holdre, Kreis Fellin, Governorate of Livonia, Russian Empire (Present-day Estonia)
- Died: 21 October 1970 (aged 95) Stockholm, Sweden
- Denomination: Lutheran
- Parents: Toomas Kõpp & Kristiina Pallitser
- Spouse: Marie Helene Grant
- Children: 4

Johan Kõpp (9 November 1874, Holdre, Kreis Fellin – 21 October 1970, Stockholm) was an Estonian bishop and head of the Estonian Evangelical Lutheran Church 1939–1944.

== Biography ==
Kõpp went to high school at the Hugo Treffner Gymnasium in Tartu and then studied theology at the University of Tartu. He graduated from university in 1906. After his studies he initially worked as a high school teacher in Pärnu but from 1909 to 1922 was pastor in Laiuse. Already in 1916 he had however taken up a teaching position at the University of Tartu as one of the first ethnic Estonians to do so after the Estonian Declaration of Independence. From 1920 to 1927 he was deputy rector of the university, and from 1928 to 1937 rector. During the interwar period Kõpp was also leader of the Christian People's Party.

Kõpp was instrumental in organising and setting up the Estonian Evangelical Lutheran Church in 1917 and in 1939 he was elevated to the position of bishop and leader of the church. During the first Soviet occupation of Estonia in 1940 following the Molotov–Ribbentrop Pact, Kõpp stayed in Estonia. The situation for the church however became strenuous, as most Baltic German priests (who constituted one fifth of the priests in the country) were "repatriated" to Nazi Germany and as the church was harassed by Soviet authorities. Among other things, land owned by the church was confiscated and the printing of religious books banned. During the following German occupation, things became somewhat easier for the church as most of the pre-war rights of the church were restored. However, the relationship with the German occupational authorities were also not without conflict; for example, the Germans confiscated and melted down church bells to use the materials in the war effort. In 1944, when the Red Army re-occupied Estonia and drove out the Germans, Johan Kõpp fled to Sweden. Half of the active priests in Estonia at the time made the same decision to flee.

Before leaving, Kõpp authorised Anton Eilart to act as leader of the church in Estonia; however Eilart was soon arrested by the NKVD and later had to go underground. Following this, Kõpp led the church from abroad. He managed to establish a network among exiled Estonian priests to uphold the organisation of the church and preserve its use of Estonian. Because of this, the church gained international acceptance as the representative of Estonian Lutherans and was among the founding members of the Lutheran World Federation in Lund in 1947. Under the leadership of Kõpp in exile, the church also established an institute for the education of new priests and a magazine, Estonian Church. Kõpp retired in 1965 and died in Stockholm, the capital of Sweden.

Kõpp was an honorary alumnus of the Estonian Students' Society and published a book about the history of the Society in the years 1870–1905.

Preceded by Hugo Bernhard Rahamägi	Archbishop of the Estonian Evangelical Lutheran Church; 1939–1944	Succeeded by Jaan Kiivit Sr
