= Andres Põder =

Estonian clergyman

The Most Reverend Andres Põder
- Archbishop of Tallinn; Primate of the Estonian Evangelical Lutheran Church
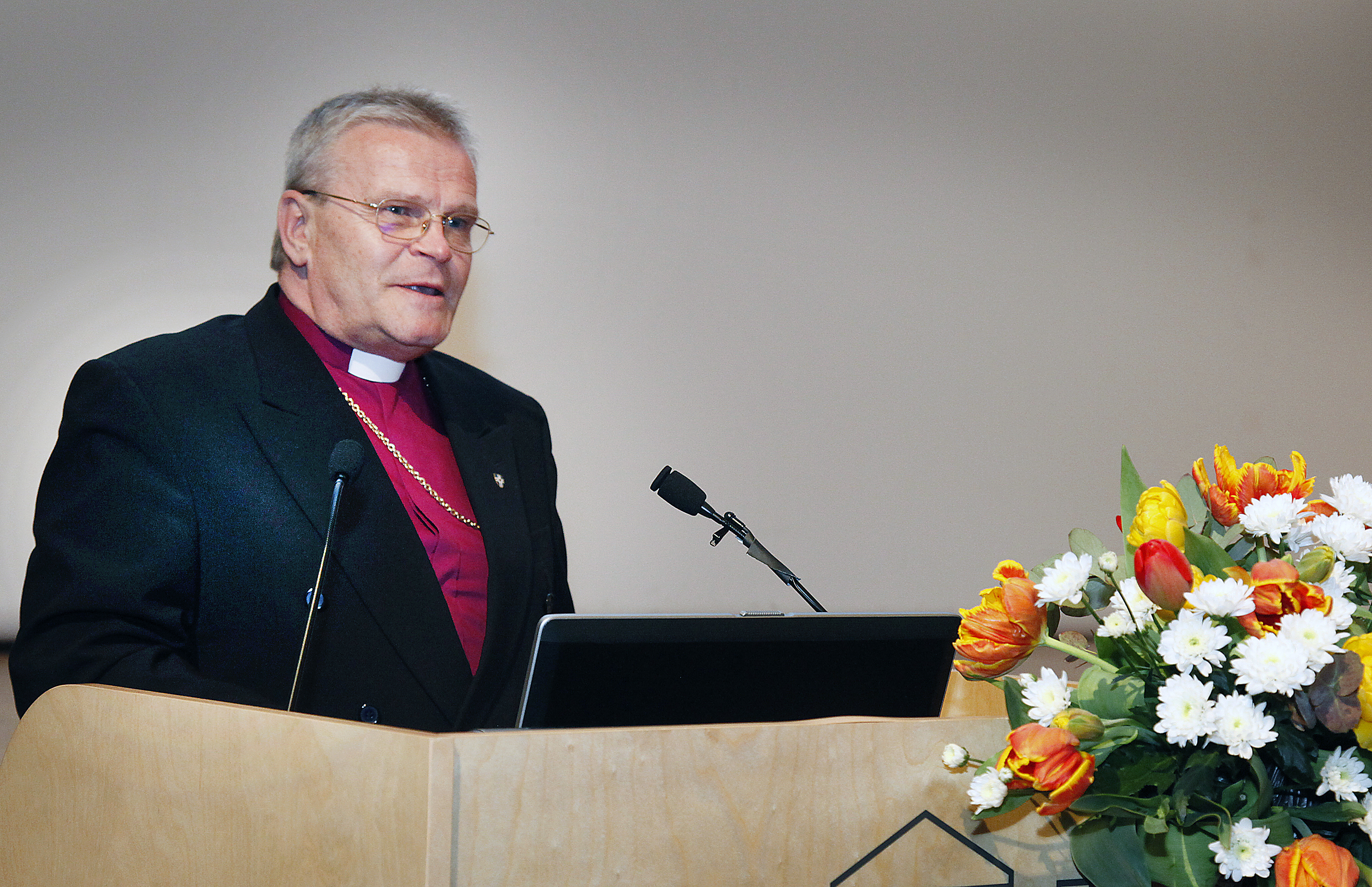
- Andres Põder, 2013
- Church: Estonian Evangelical Lutheran Church
- Archdiocese: Tallinn
- Elected: 24 November 2004
- In office: 2005–2014
- Predecessor: Jaan Kiivit Jr.
- Successor: Urmas Viilma

Orders
- Ordination: 19 September 1976 by Alfred Tooming
- Consecration: 2 February 2005 by Jaan Kiivit Jr.

Personal details
- Born: 22 November 1949 (age 77) Haapsalu, then part of Estonian SSR, Soviet Union
- Spouse: Marje Põder
- Children: 3

Ordination history of Andres Põder
History
Priestly ordination
- Ordained by: Alfred Tooming
- Date: 19 September 1976
- Place: St. Mary's Cathedral, Tallinn
Episcopal consecration
- Principal consecrator: Jaan Kiivit Jr.
- Co-consecrators: K. G. Hammar; Jukka Paarma; Janis Vanags; Udo Petersoo; Kenneth Stevenson; Martin Hein; Karl Ludwig Kohlwage
- Date: 2 February 2005
- Place: St. Mary's Cathedral, Tallinn

Andres Põder (born 22 November 1949) is an Estonian clergyman, bishop emeritus and the former archbishop of Tallinn and primate of the Evangelical Lutheran Church of Estonia (EELK) from 2005–2014. Põder was the president of Estonian Council of Churches from 2013 to 2022.

== Biography ==
Põder was born on 22 November 1949 in Haapsalu. He was ordained priest on 19 September 1976 and served as pastor in Kunda, Viru-Nigula Parish. In 1979 he transferred to Kõpu and in 1983 congregations in Räpina and Mehikoorma. Between 1990 and 2005 he served as pastor of St. Elizabeth's Church, Pärnu.

He was elected on 24 November 2004 as Archbishop of Tallinn and Primate of the Estonian church. He was consecrated on 2 February 2005 by Jaan Kiivit Jr., the outgoing archbishop, in St Mary's Cathedral, Tallinn. He retired on 22 November 2014.

Titles in Lutheranism
Preceded by Jaan Kiivit Jr.	Archbishop of the Evangelical Lutheran Church of Estonia; Lutheran Primate of Estonia; 2005–2015	Succeeded by Urmas Viilma
