= Jakob Kukk =

Estonian bishop

The Most Reverend Jakob Kukk
- Bishop of Tallinn; Primate of the Estonian Evangelical Lutheran Church
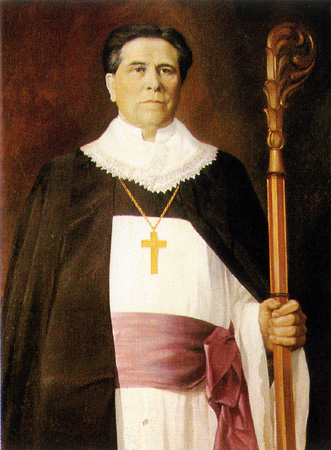
- Church: Estonian Evangelical Lutheran Church
- Archdiocese: Tallinn
- Elected: 12 September 1919
- Successor: Hugo Bernhard Rahamägi

Orders
- Ordination: 6 January 1899
- Consecration: 5 June 1921 by Nathan Söderblom

Personal details
- Born: 9 September 1870 Ilmatsalu, Russian Empire (Present-day Estonia)
- Died: 25 July 1933 (aged 62) Tallinn, Estonia
- Buried: Siselinna Cemetery in Tallinn
- Denomination: Lutheran
- Parents: Jaak Kukk & Anu Tinni
- Spouse: Melanie Kulju
- Children: 3

Jakob Kukk (9 September 1870 - 25 July 1933) was an Estonian prelate who served as the first bishop of the independent Estonian Evangelical Lutheran Church.

== Biography ==
Kukk was born on 9 September 1870 in Ilmatsalu, Governorate of Livonia, in the Russian Empire. He studied theology at University of Tartu between 1891 and 1895. He was ordained on 6 January 1899 in Riga and served as a priest in Võru until 1900. Later he served as vicar of St Mary's Church in Rõuge until 1902. Between 1902 and 1904 he was assistant priest of St John's Church in Saint Petersburg. In 1904 he became assistant priest at St. Mary's Church in Tartu while in 1905 he became priest of Teškovo Church. In 1906 he became vicar of St Michael's Church in Keila, where he remained until 1921. He also served as a military chaplain during the Estonian War of Independence.

Kukk was elected the first bishop of the Estonian Evangelical Lutheran Church on 12 September 1919. He was consecrated by the Archbishop of Uppsala Nathan Söderblom at the Charles' Church, Tallinn on 5 June 1921. He governed the Estonian church until his death in 1933. He married Melanie Kulju on 5 May 1924. After his death, he was buried at the Vana-Kaarli Cemetery section within Siselinna Cemetery in Tallinn.

| Preceded by none | Archbishop of Tallinn; Primate of the Estonian Evangelical Lutheran Church; 1921–1933 | Succeeded by Hugo Bernhard Rahamägi |
