= Einar Soone =

Estonian bishop

The Right Reverend Einar Soone
- Bishop Emeritus of the Northern Region
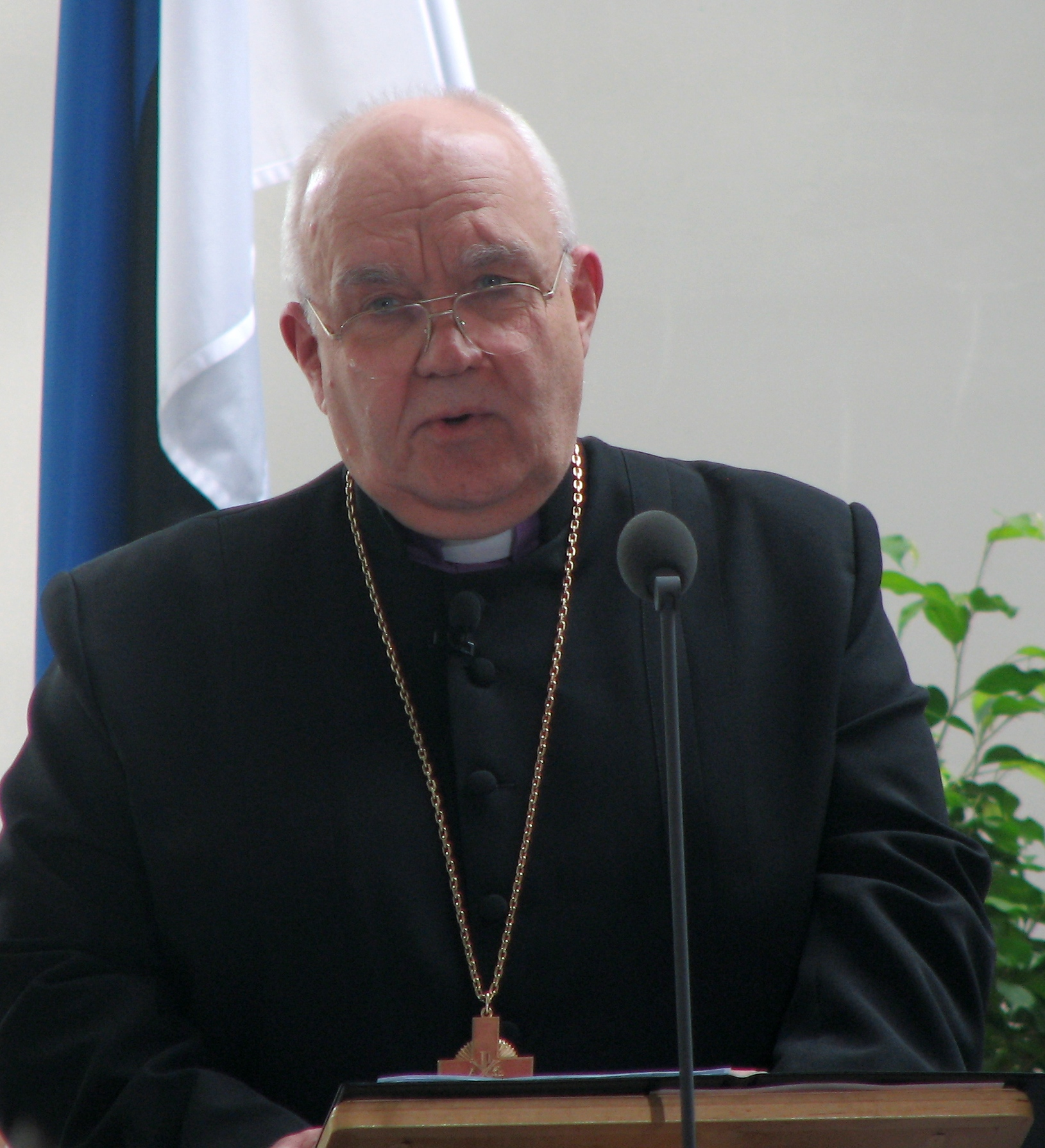
- Church: Estonian Evangelical Lutheran Church
- Diocese: Northern Region
- Elected: 2 September 1992
- In office: 1992–2017

Orders
- Ordination: 3 October 1973 by Alfred Tooming
- Consecration: 12 December 1992 by Kuno Pajula

Personal details
- Born: 26 September 1947 (age 79) Rapla, Estonia
- Denomination: Lutheran
- Parents: Johannes Eduard Soone & Pauliine Steinfeldt
- Spouse: Viivi Kalju
- Children: 5

Ordination history of Einar Soone
History
Priestly ordination
- Ordained by: Alfred Tooming
Episcopal consecration
- Principal consecrator: Kuno Pajula
- Co-consecrators: Udo Petersoo; David Tustin; Lars-Göran Lönnermark; Aimo T. Nikolainen

Einar Soone (born 26 September 1947) is an Estonian prelate who served as suffragan bishop to the Archbishop of Tallinn and the first Bishop of the Diocese of the Northern Region in Estonia.

== Biography ==
Soone commenced studies in 1970 at the Institute of Theology of the Estonian Evangelical Lutheran Church. He was ordained priest on 3 October 1973 by Archbishop Alfred Tooming and was appointed pastor of the congregations in Lüganuse and Kiviõli. On 29 May 1980, after graduating from the Institute of Theology, he was awarded his warrant as a priest. From 1985 till 2012 he also served as Pastor of Charles' Church, Tallinn.

In 1992, the Church Council elected him a bishop of the EELC. Archbishop Kuno Pajula consecrated him bishop on 12 December 1992 in St. Mary's Cathedral, Tallinn. For several years (1989-2017), Soone was the representative of Estonian Evangelical Lutheran Church in the Council of Churches. On 22 January 1993 he was elected President of the Estonian Council of Churches, and he held this position for 20 years. He also represented the Estonian Evangelical Lutheran Church in assemblies and conferences of international ecumenical organisations. Soone retired on 27 September 2017.

Bishop Soone's work has been highly recognised by the Church and many state and social institutions. On the 84th anniversary of the Republic of Estonia, the President of the Republic awarded Soone with the 2nd Class Order of the Estonian Red Cross.

== Bibliography ==
- (foreword) Riho Altnurme, Eesti oikumeenia lugu (2009) ISBN 9789949185207
