= Uppsala House =

Historic wooden building in Tartu, Estonia

- Uppsala maja
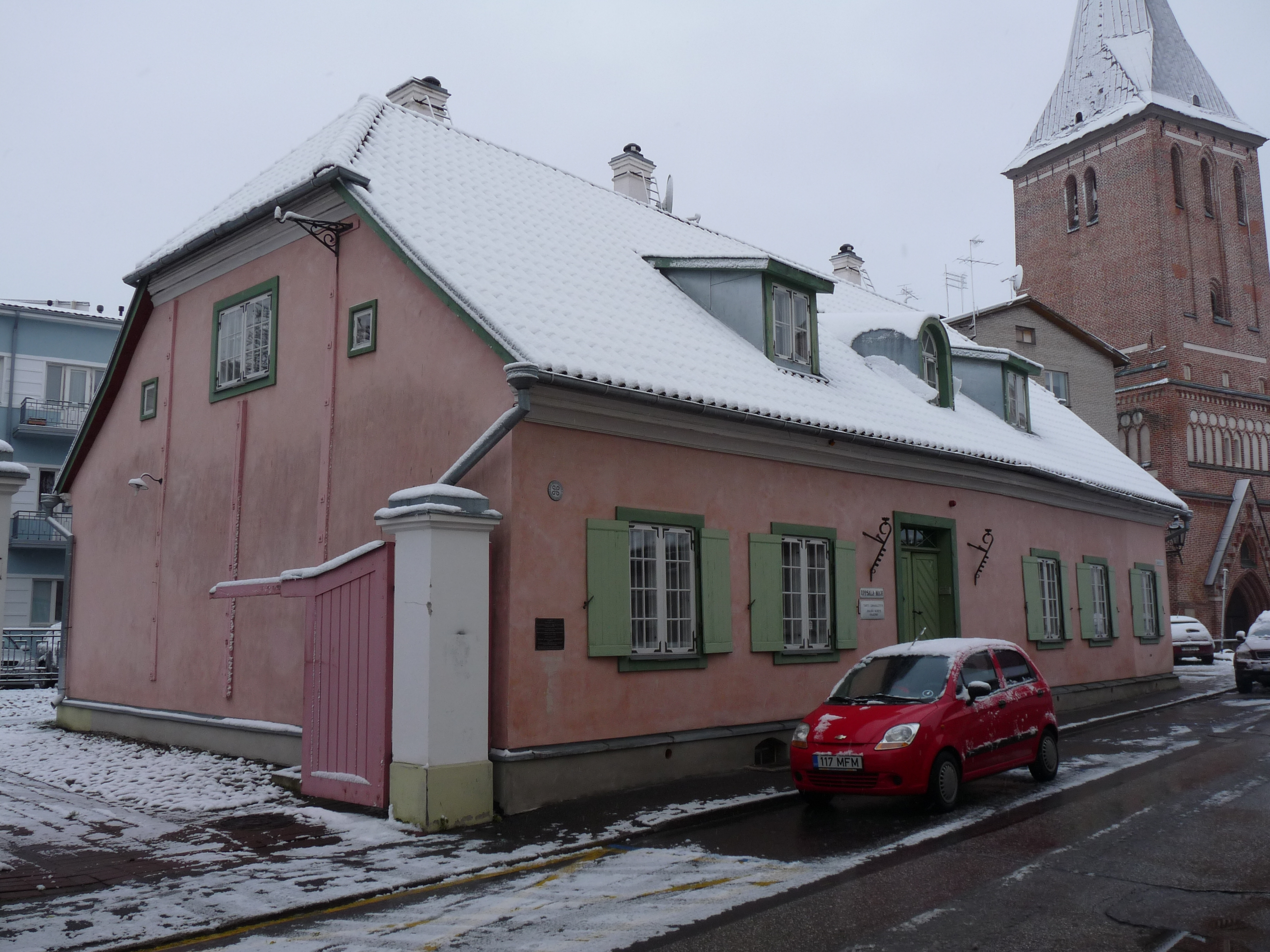
- Uppsala House in 2012
- Interactive map of the Uppsala House area

General information
- Type: Wooden house
- Location: Jaani 7, Tartu, Estonia
- Coordinates: 58.3831°N 26.7181°E
- Completed: c.1770
- Renovated: 1996

Technical details
- Floor count: 1

Website
- www.uppsalamaja.ee

Uppsala House (Estonian: Uppsala maja) is one of the oldest wooden buildings in Tartu, Estonia. It is close to St John's Church in the northern part of the Old Town. The house was renovated in cooperation with Tartu's sister city of Uppsala in Sweden. Since 2010, it has served as the office of the Department of Public Relations of Tartu City Government.

== History ==
One of the oldest wooden buildings in Tartu, it dates from the 1750s. The oldest part of the building is the northern part, dated by studying the timbers using dendrochronology. This is an important date because it shows that the timbers predate the 1775 Great Fire of Tartu that consumed most of the wooden buildings in central Tartu. After the fire the city was rebuilt along Late Baroque and Neoclassical lines.

Dendrochronology enabled later additions to be dated to be between 1777 and 1782.

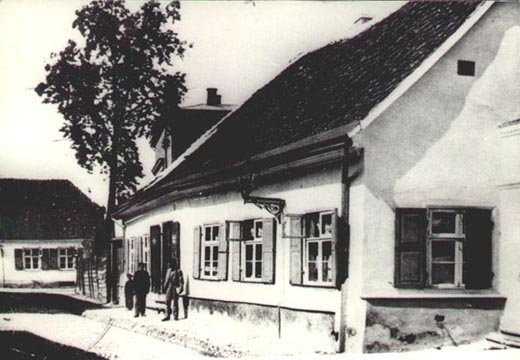
The house at the end of the 19th century

The overall plan of the building was stable by 1828 when the two-storey house had this ground plan. The building has been put to a multitude of uses: in the nineteenth century it was used as a students residence and as a butcher shop. Other professionals that have lived here include a saddle maker, a tailor, and an official of the Livonian court. In 1937 the building was partially rebuilt after a fire.

Today the building has a half-hipped (also known as clipped-gable or Jerkinhead) shaped roof. In 1993 the twinned cities of Uppsala and Tartu agreed to a joint programme to cooperate in the "Restoration of Old Buildings" initiative. The renovation of Uppsala House was completed in 1996. Photographs taken before this renovation did not show any dormer windows, but windows were placed in the roof at the end of the building.

The renovated house was operated as a five-bedroom guest house until 2010, when financial losses led to its closure. Since then, it has served as Tartu city offices.

== Description ==
The house is located on one of the main streets in Tartu Old Town known as Jaani ("St. John's"). It is close to St John's Church, an older brick building. Both buildings are to the north of the town centre. The house is owned by the city of Tartu. The building was intended to be financed from a number of sources including rental of its rooms. In 2010 there was a crisis because the occupancy rates had been low at a time of economic recession. The accommodation is no longer available.
