= Estonian Council of Churches =

Organization based in Estonia

Estonian Council of Churches (ECC; Estonian: Eesti Kirikute Nõukogu) is an Estonian organisation which unites and promotes co-operation between Christian churches and congregations in Estonia.

ECC president is Urmas Viilma.

ECC is an associate member of Conference of European Churches.

== ECC members ==
ECC has 10 members:

- Estonian Evangelical Lutheran Church
- Union of Evangelical Christian and Baptist Churches of Estonia
- Estonian Methodist Church
- Roman Catholic Church
- Estonian Christian Pentecostal Church
- Estonian Conference of Seventh-day Adventists Church
- Estonian Congregation St. Gregory of the Armenian Apostolic Church
- Orthodox Church of Estonia
- Estonian Orthodox Church of Moscow Patriarchate
- Charismatic Episcopal Church of Estonia.
