= St. John's Church, Tartu =

Church building in Tartu, Estonia

St John's Church, Tartu
- Parish Church of Saint John the Baptist, Tartu
- Estonian: Tartu Jaani kirik
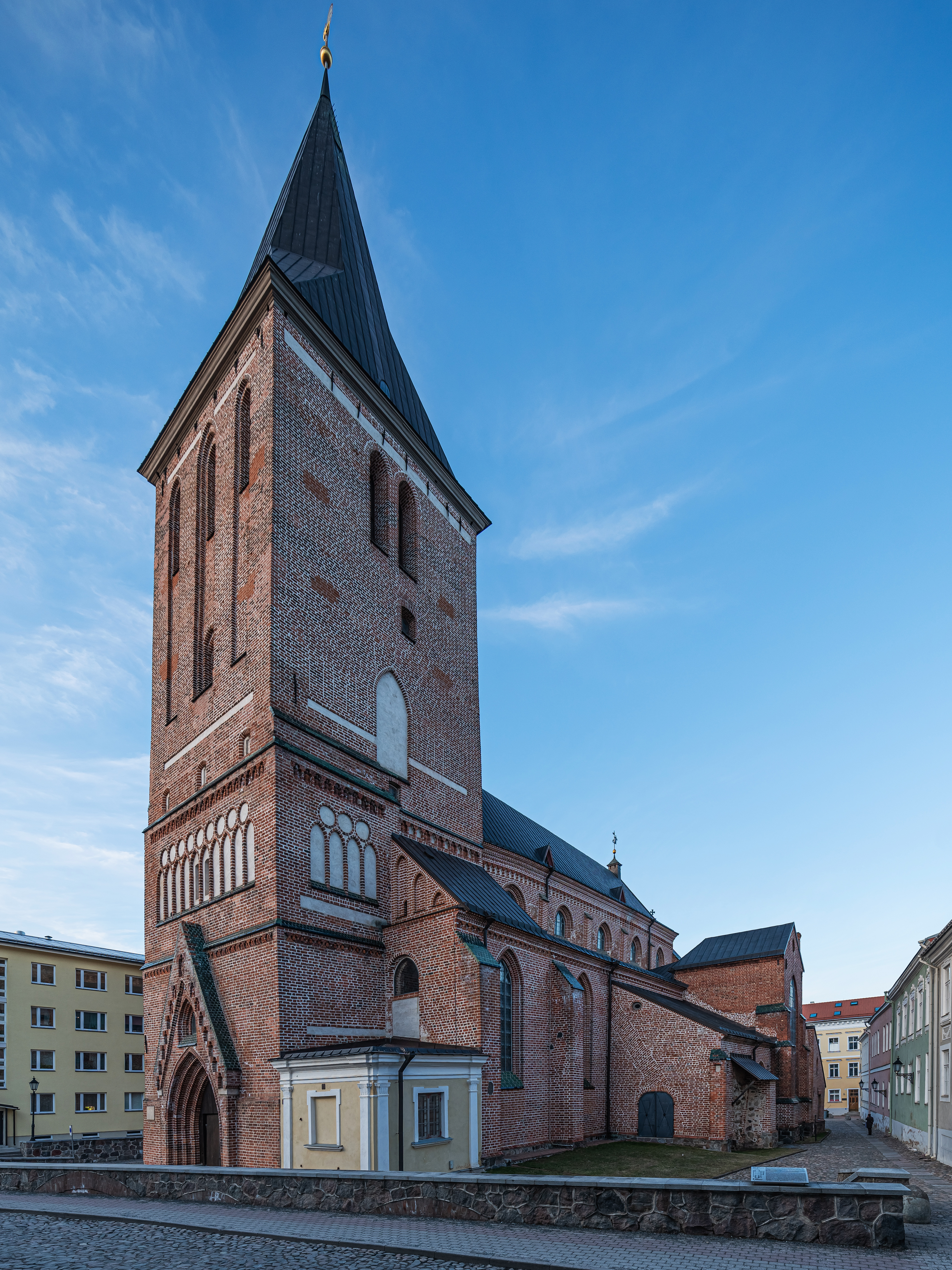
- St John's Church, Tartu
- 58°22′57.72″N 26°43′12.72″E
- Location: Tartu
- Address: Jaani 5
- Country: Estonia
- Language: Estonian
- Denomination: Lutheran
- Previous denomination: Catholic
- Website: jaanikirik.ee

History
- Status: Active
- Founded: 12th century
- Dedication: John the Baptist

Architecture
- Functional status: Parish church
- Heritage designation: Kultuurimälestis (no. 6916)
- Designated: 16 September 1997
- Architectural type: Basilica
- Style: Gothic
- Years built: 14th century
- Groundbreaking: 12th century

Specifications
- Materials: Brick; Terracotta (façade)

Administration
- Diocese: Southern Region
- Deanery: Tartu
- Parish: St John's in Tartu

Clergy
- Bishop: Joel Luhamets
- Rector: Triin Käpp; Naatan Haamer

St. John's Church, Tartu (Estonian: Jaani kirik, German: St. Johanniskirche zu Dorpat) is a Brick Gothic Lutheran church, one of the landmarks of the city of Tartu, Estonia. It is dedicated to John the Baptist.

== History ==
Initially, St John's was a Catholic church, as the oldest parts of the current building originate from the 14th century. Before that, there has been a church building on the same place at least since the first half of the 13th century. Archaeological investigations have indicated that there may well have been a wooden church here in the 12th century. This is particularly remarkable because the national Christianisation did not take place until much later. The red brick building has seen extensive changes, as it was largely rebuilt after both the Great Northern War and World War II. Baroque chapels were added in 1746 and 1769. The church is now part of the Estonian Evangelical Lutheran Church.

The Great Fire of Tartu started near the church in 1775 and the church and nearby Uppsala House were spared the destruction which destroyed nearly two hundred houses.

At the end of the 19th century the church supplied primary education. The actress Amalie Konsa received her only schooling here.

== Description ==
The most outstanding feature of St. John's is its wealth of terracotta figurines surrounding the church's exterior. Originally, there were more than a thousand hand-made figurines, each different from the others; now, about 200 have survived. The large number of individual figurines has given birth to the hypothesis that they might have been modelled after citizens of Tartu; on the other hand, some of them wear crowns, which hints they might depict someone else.

Since 1999, St John's Church has two new bells named Peetrus and Paulus after city's two patron saints (respectively, St. Peter and St. Paul).

== Church's congregation ==
The church is used by Tartu University-St. John's Congregation (Estonian: Tartu Ülikooli-Jaani kogudus). Before 2001, Tartu University Congregation and Tartu St. John's Congregation were standalone congregations.

== See also ==
- Architecture of Estonia
- List of Brick Gothic buildings
