= Urmas Viilma =

Estonian archbishop

The Most Reverend Urmas Viilma
- Archbishop of Tallinn; Primate of the Estonian Evangelical Lutheran Church
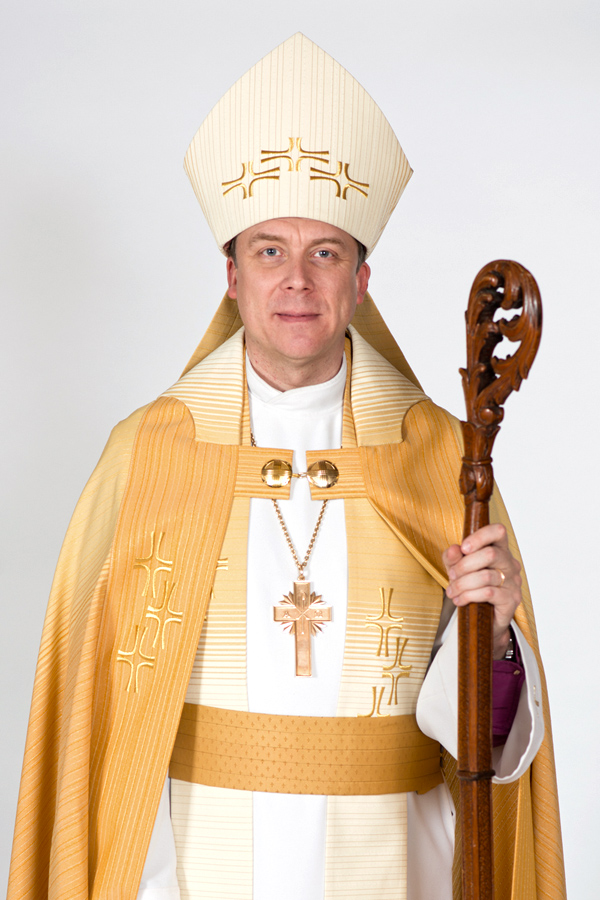
- Viilma in 2016
- Church: Estonian Evangelical Lutheran Church
- Archdiocese: Tallinn
- Elected: 26 November 2014
- Predecessor: Andres Põder

Orders
- Ordination: 2 May 1993 (deacon); 15 September 1998 (priest) by Einar Soone
- Consecration: 2 February 2015 by Einar Soone

Personal details
- Born: August 13, 1973 (age 53) Tallinn, Estonia
- Spouse: Egle Viilma
- Children: 1
- Motto: Credite in Lucem
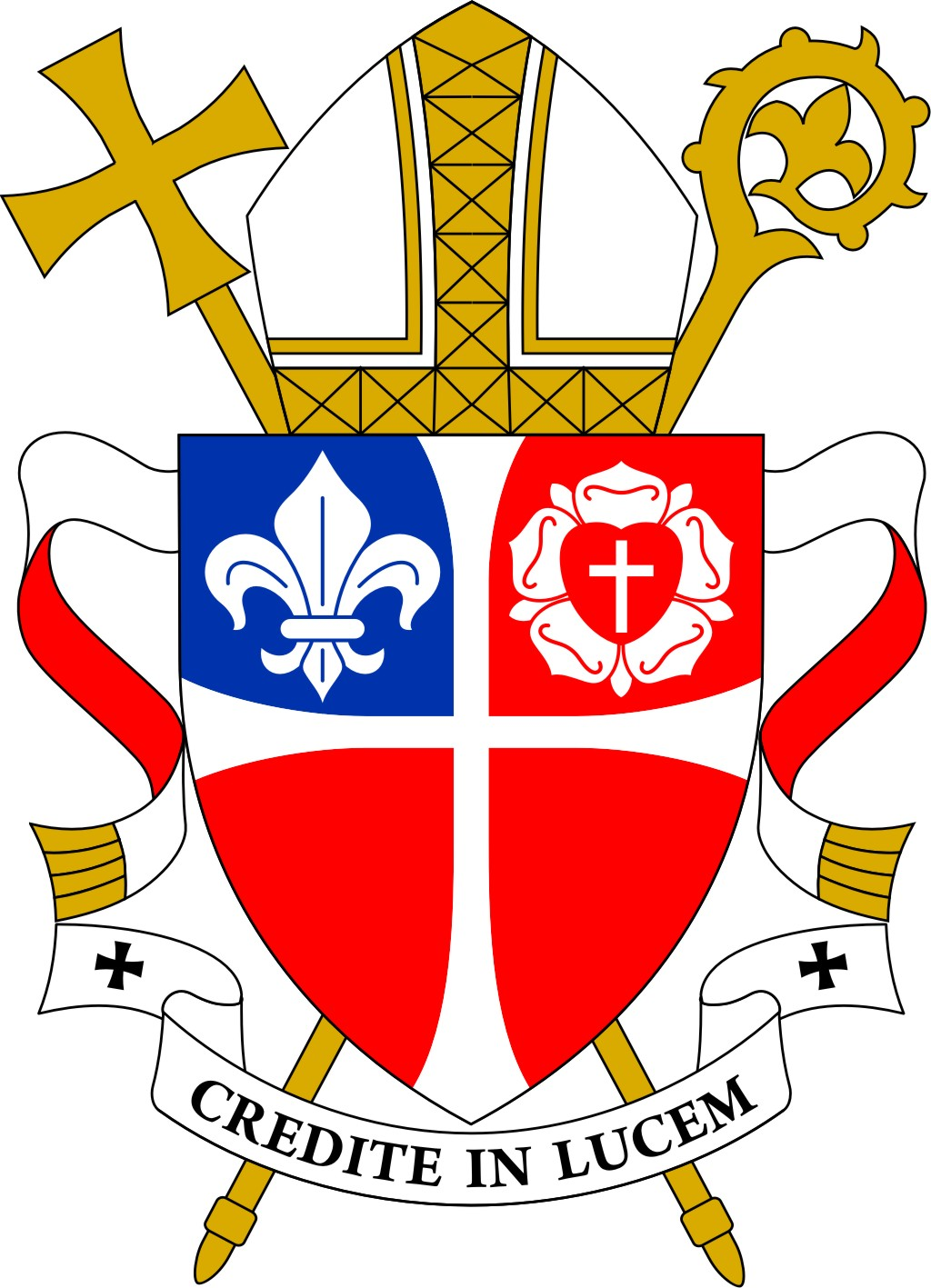
- Coat of arms: Urmas Viilma's coat of arms

Ordination history of Urmas Viilma
History
Priestly ordination
- Ordained by: Einar Soone
Episcopal consecration
- Principal consecrator: Einar Soone
- Co-consecrators: Andres Põder; Andres Taul; Munib Younan; Michael Jackson; Steen Skovsgaard; Michael Bünker

Urmas Viilma (born 13 August 1973) is an Estonian prelate and current archbishop of Tallinn and subsequently Primate of the Estonian Evangelical Lutheran Church.

== Biography ==
Viilma was ordained a deacon on 2 May 1993 in St Michael's church in Keila by Bishop Einar Soone. On 15 September 1998 he was ordained a priest in St Mary's Cathedral, Tallinn by Archbishop Jaan Kiivit Junior. On 26 November 2014, he was elected to the Estonian Evangelical Lutheran Synod by the archbishop. He was ordained a bishop and was appointed Archbishop on 2 February 2015. He was consecrated by bishop Einar Soone, bishop Andres Taul and bishop Andres Põder.

== Career ==
After ordination as a deacon, Viilma was appointed as deacon in the parish of Keila. The same year he was appointed as deacon in the parish of Parnu-Jacobi, holding this post till 1998. Between 1998 and 2004 he was pastor of Pärnu-Jakobi. He also worked in the Pärnu Provincial Support Office between 1999 and 2003. He was also pastor of the parish of Mihkli, Tõstamaa and Vigala, respectively and simultaneously, between 1999 and 2004. Later he also held various positions within the Lutheran church of Estonia notably the head of the council of the Diocese of Tallinn between 2010 and 2015.

Titles in Lutheranism
Preceded by Andres Põder	Archbishop of the Evangelical Lutheran Church of Estonia; Lutheran Primate of Estonia; 2015–present	Succeeded by Incumbent
