= Estonian Evangelical Lutheran Church =

Protestant-oriented Christian denomination in Estonia

- Eesti Evangeelne Luterlik Kirik
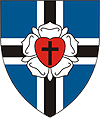
- Abbreviation: EELK
- Classification: Protestant
- Orientation: Lutheran
- Scripture: Protestant Bible
- Theology: High church Lutheran
- Polity: Episcopal-Synodal
- Primate: Urmas Viilma
- Associations: Lutheran World Federation, World Council of Churches, Conference of European Churches, Porvoo Communion; Community of Protestant Churches in Europe
- Region: Estonia
- Origin: 1917/1949
- Congregations: 167
- Members: 160,000 (2025)
- Official website: http://www.eelk.ee/

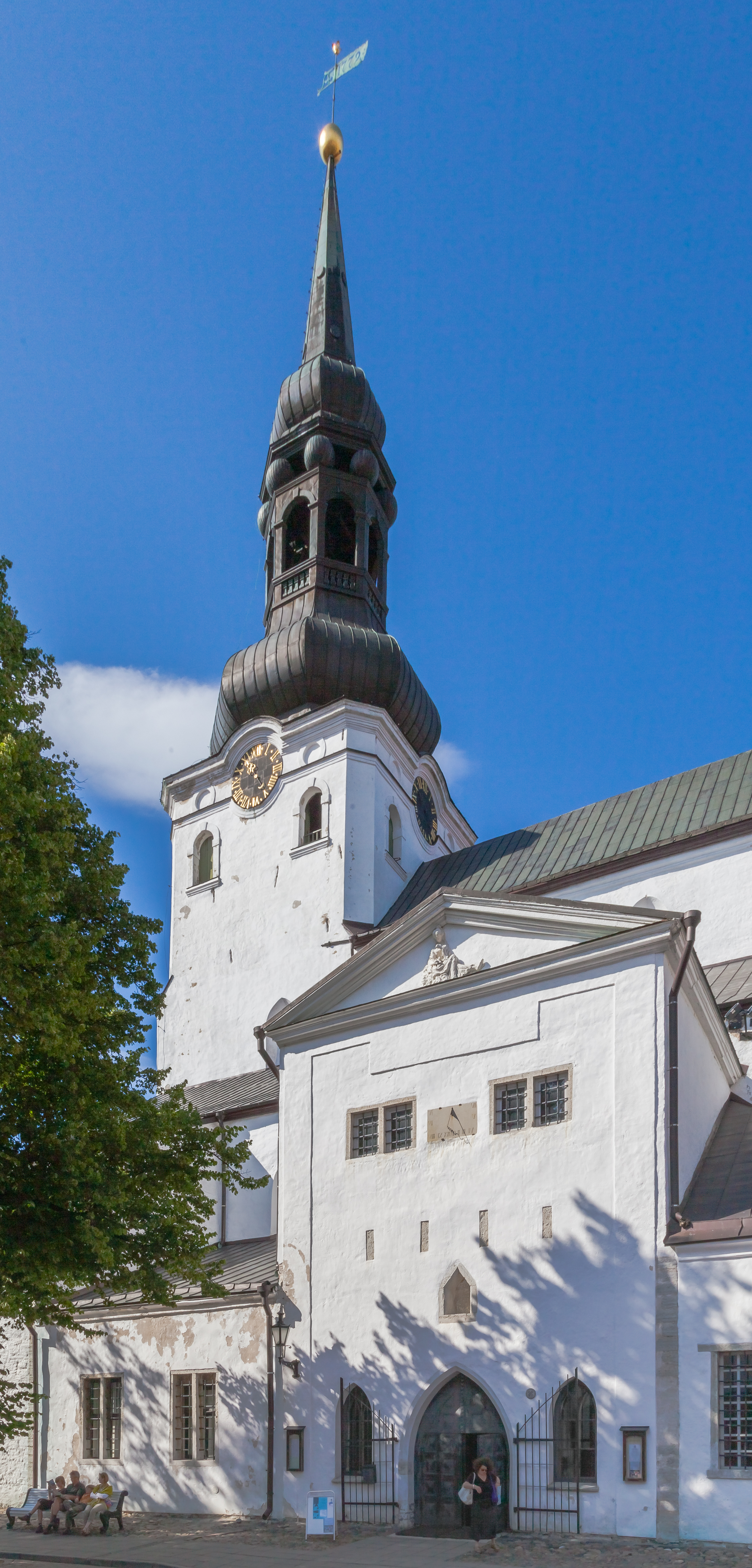
St Mary's Cathedral, Tallinn

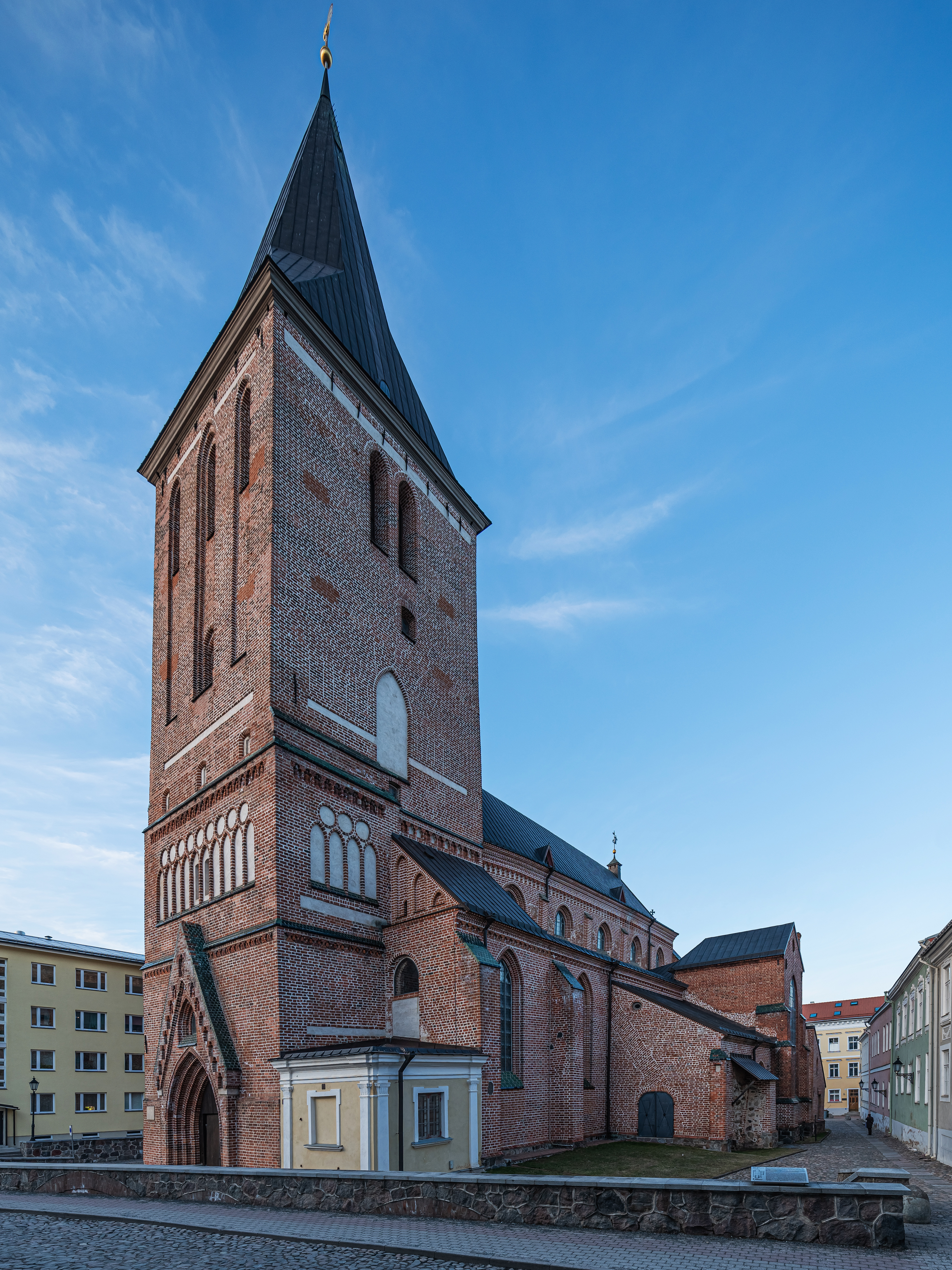
St. John's Church, Tartu

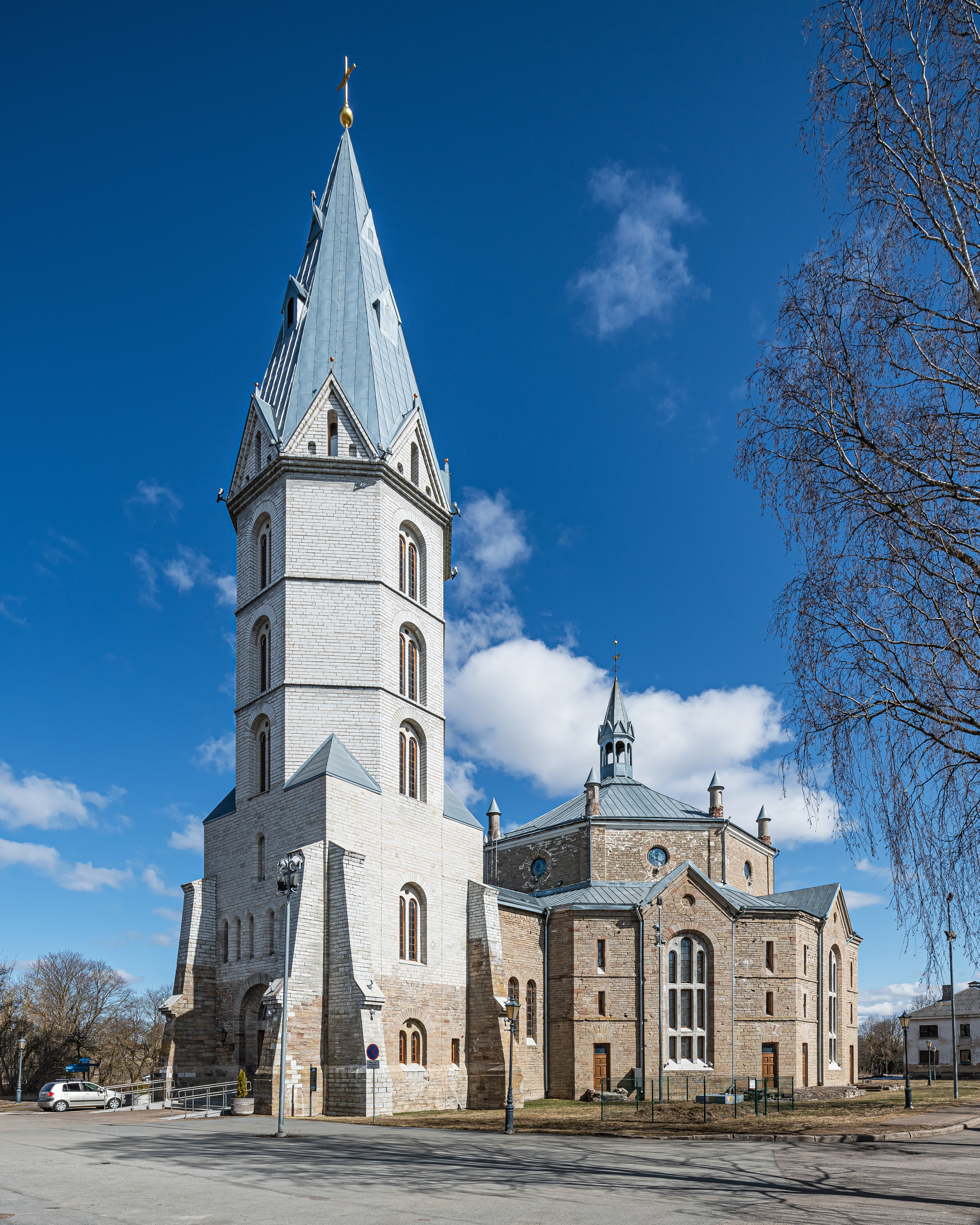
Alexander Cathedral, Narva

The Estonian Evangelical Lutheran Church (Estonian: Eesti Evangeelne Luterlik Kirik, abbreviated EELK) is a Lutheran church in Estonia. The EELK is member of the Lutheran World Federation and belongs to the Community of Protestant Churches in Europe. It is also a member of the Porvoo Communion, putting it in full communion with the Church of England and other Anglican churches in Europe.

== History ==
The Estonian Evangelical Lutheran Church (EELK) began as result of the First Church Congress in 1917. When the Soviet Union invaded Estonia in 1940, most Christian organizations were dissolved, church property was confiscated, theologians were exiled to Siberia, and religious education programs were outlawed. World War II later brought devastation to many church buildings. In 1944, 70,000 Estonians had left the country, among them Bishop Johan Kõpp and more than 70 pastors. Nevertheless, the Church retained its legal status as a religious organization during the Soviet era, albeit subject to certain restrictions. Jaan Kiivit Sr became an archbishop in 1949 and served the EELK in Estonia from 1949 to 1967. The EELK in Estonia joined the Lutheran World Federation in 1963. It was not until 1988 that church activities were renewed when a movement for religious tolerance began in the Soviet Union. In 2010 the EELK in exile and the EELK in Estonia united. The LWF recognizes the EELK as the legal successor to the EELK in exile and dates its membership in the LWF to 1947.

Although women had studied theology at Tartu University in the 1920s and some had sought ordination as priests, it was not until 1967 that the first woman, Laine Villenthal, was ordained. In 2014, the church reported that there were 169 men and 43 women serving as ministers.

While the EELK is not an established church, until 2023 it enjoyed a preferential status not extended to other churches in Estonia. In May 2023, Interior Minister Lauri Läänemets said that the state cannot favour one church over others, adding that a committee would be created involving the ecumenical Estonian Council of Churches.

== Leadership ==
The Church of Estonia is episcopal in polity and is led by five bishops, including the archbishop who serves as the Primate. The archbishop has overall authority, and under his authority there are four jurisdictions, each with its own bishop.

| Diocese | Cathedral | See | Current bishop |
|---|---|---|---|
| Archdiocese of Tallinn | St Mary's Cathedral, Tallinn | Tallinn | Urmas Viilma (Primate of Estonia) |
| Diocese of the West and Isles | St. Lawrence's Church, Kuressaare | Kuressaare | Anti Toplaan |
| Diocese of Southern Estonia | John the Evangelist Church, Viljandi | Viljandi | Marko Tiitus |
| Diocese of Northern Estonia | St Mary's Cathedral, Tallinn | Tallinn | Ove Sander |

Following the retirement of Andres Põder as archbishop, the current archbishop, Urmas Viilma, was consecrated on 2 February 2015.

During the Soviet occupation of Estonia, the Archbishop went into exile, which resulted in the formation of a parallel church, the Estonian Evangelical Lutheran Church Abroad. Until 2010, this body was independent, with its own archbishop based in Canada. In 2010, the two churches reunited, and the former overseas church became a diocese of the Estonian Evangelical Lutheran Church, known as the Extra-Estonian Diocese (Estonian: Välis-Eesti piiskopkond).

== Bishops and Archbishops of Tallinn and Primates ==
- Jaan Kiivit Sr. (1949–1967) (First Archbishop)
- Alfred Tooming (1967–1977)
- Edgar Hark (1978–1986)
- Kuno Pajula (1987–1994)
- Jaan Kiivit Jr. (1994–2005)
- Andres Põder (2005–2014)
- Urmas Viilma (2015–present)

== Education and media ==
The church has its own educational institution, Institute of Theology of the Estonian Evangelical Lutheran Church, founded in 1946. The Institute also has the Academy of Theology in Tartu.

The church’s newspaper “Eesti Kirik” ("Estonian Church") is published once a week.

== Membership ==
As of February 2009, the EELK reported approximately 160,000 baptized members and the EELK Abroad (based in Canada) reported approximately 8,000 baptized members. A previous figure broke down the EELK Abroad into 3,508 members with 12 clergy in the USA and 5,536 members with 11 clergy in Canada.

In 2014, the Lutheran World Federation (LWF) reported the number of registered members as being 180,000. The church reported that it had served 143,895 communicants. As of 2025, the LWF reported 160,000 members.

== Social issues ==
The church has both theologically conservative and liberal members. The church does ordain women to the priesthood, unlike the more conservative Evangelical Lutheran Church of Latvia and Evangelical Lutheran Church of Lithuania. In an interview, Archbishop Urmas Viilma stated that the church allows women ordination and "will continue to do so". The church disapproves of homosexual unions, believing marriage is the sacred union of a man and a woman. It only allows celibate gay ministers to be ordained. However, Archbishop Viilma did state that if same-sex marriage is legalized in the country, "then the church will clearly need to redefine itself", but he also stated that "we clearly interpret the Bible to say that practicing homosexuality is sin...but we all are equal in God’s eyes and welcome in church." Archbishop Viilma announced his support for civil unions and agreed to be a part of a panel working in 2021 on a proposal to pass a bill to define marriage as heterosexual and to strengthen the civil partnership registration with equal rights for same-sex couples. In 2023, in response to the legalization of same-sex marriage in Estonia, the church reaffirmed its position that clergy could only perform or bless heterosexual marriages. Archbishop Viilma opposed the legalization of same-sex marriage, arguing that the government could improve the "Cohabitation Act" and that civil unions were sufficient for same-sex couples. The Lutherans leaned toward opposing the death penalty, although they took no official stance, and the church does not have a committee "dealing with social-political questions".

== Awards conferred by EELK ==
There are three awards conferred by EELK:

1. Cross of Merit of EELK (Estonian: EELK teeneterist)
2. Member of the Order of Merit (Estonian: EELK teeneteristi tunnustusmärk)
3. Golden Cross (Estonian: EELK kuldrist).
