= Lauristin =

Lauristin is a surname. Notable people with the surname include:

- Jean-Eudes Lauristin (born 1994), French Guianan footballer
- Johannes Lauristin (1899–1941), Estonian communist politician, activist, collaborator, writer
- Marju Lauristin (born 1940) is an Estonian politician
- Olga Lauristin (1903–2005), Soviet Estonian politician and collaborator
