= Atika =

Atika may refer to:

- Akkar al-Atika, town in Lebanon
- Atika, armed wing of Movement of Democratic Forces of Casamance
- Atika, Estonia, village in Estonia
- Atika (cigarette)
- Atika bint Abd al-Muttalib, aunt of the Islamic prophet Muhammad
- Atika bint Shuhda, 8th-century Arabian Qiyan musician, composer, singer and poet
- Atika bint Yazid, Umayyad princess
- Atika bint Zayd, female companion of Muhammad
- Atika Bouagaa, French volleyball player
- Atika Shubert, American journalist
- Aure Atika, French actress, writer, and director
