= Räägu =

Räägu may refer to several places in Estonia:

- Räägu, Pärnu County, village in Sauga Parish, Pärnu County
- Räägu, Viljandi County, village in Abja Parish, Viljandi County
