= August Kitzberg =

Estonian writer

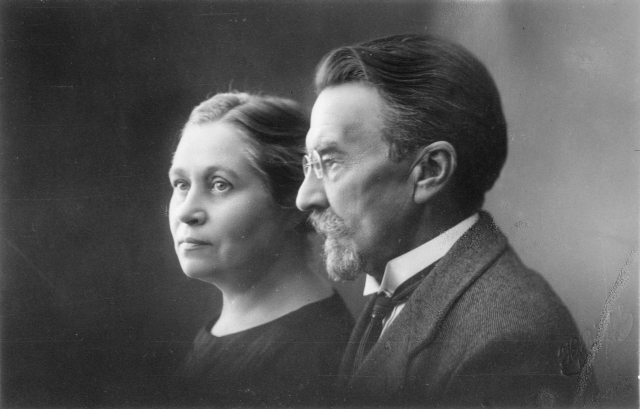
August Kitzberg with his wife, Johanna Wilhemine Kitzberg (née Roosmann)

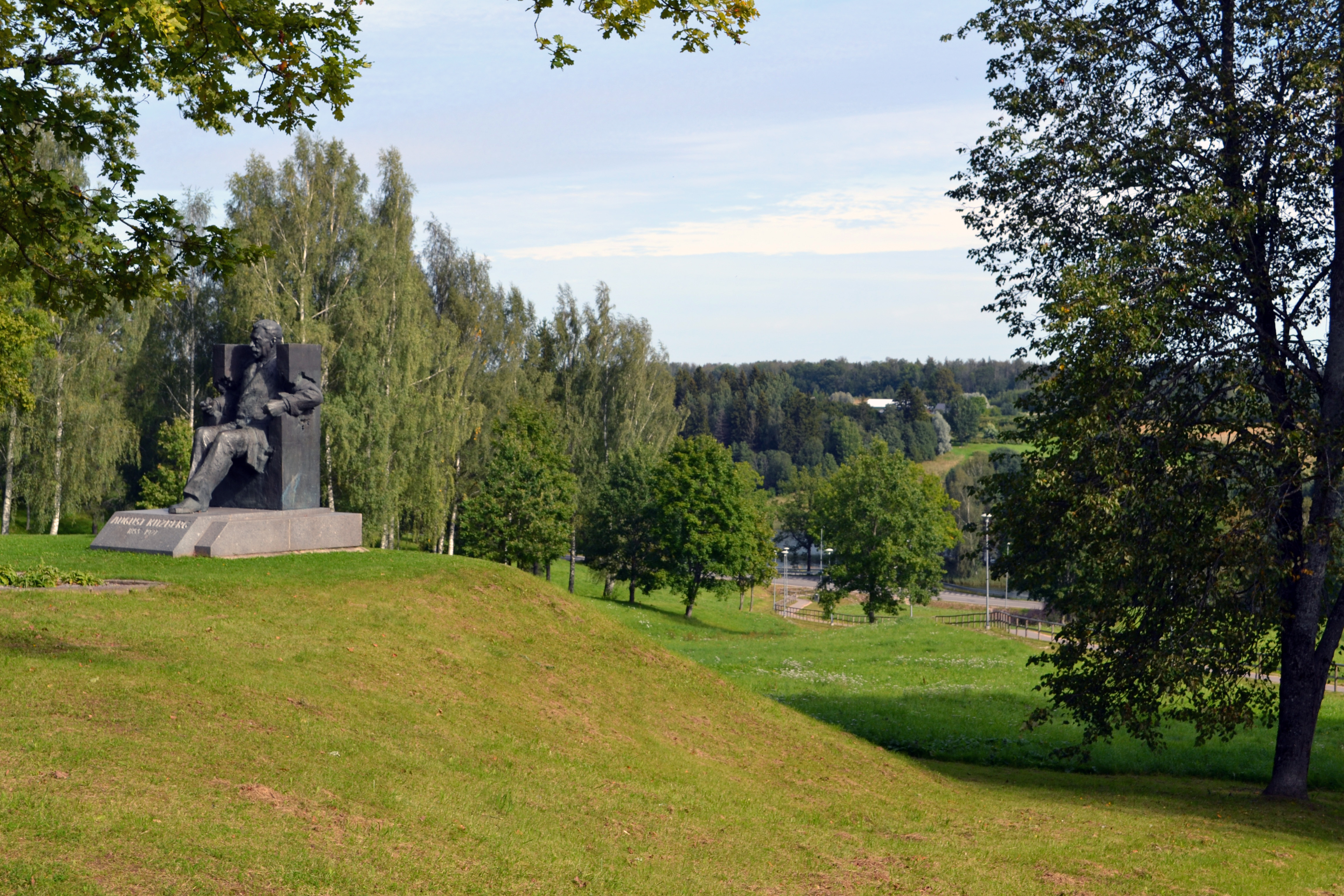
Monument to August Kitzberg in Karksi-Nuia

August Kitzberg (29 December [O.S. 17 December] 1855 in Laatre Parish, Governorate of Livonia, Russian Empire – 10 October 1927 in Tartu) was an Estonian writer.

== Life ==
Until 1863, August Kitzberg was known as August Kits. He grew up in Niitsaadu farmstead in Penuja village, Abja Parish (1857–1871), where his brother, Jaak Kits, was a schoolteacher. He worked for a time in Viljandi and present-day Latvia before moving to Tartu in 1901, where he worked as a manager of the newspaper Postimees.

His early works consisted of comedies and humorous stories of village life. In Tartu, Kitzberg began working with Karl Menning at the Vanemuine Theatre, and his plays developed a component of social criticism.

There is a monument and museum dedicated to Kitzberg in Karksi-Nuia. His play, Tuulte pöörises, was chosen for the opening play of the Rakvere Theatre in 1940.

== Works ==
=== Plays ===
- Punga–Mart ja Uba-Kaarel (1894)
- Sauna Antsu "oma" hobune (1894)
- Püve Peetri "riukad" (1897)
- Veli Henn (1901)
- Räime Reeda 10 kopikat (1903)
- Rätsep Õhk (1903)
- Hennu Veli (1904)
- Tuulte pöörises (1906)
- Libahunt (1911/12, filmed in 1968); The Ballet Tiina by Lydia Auster is based on this work
- Kaval-Ants ja Vanapagan (1912)
- Kauka jumal (1915)
- Kosjasõit (1915)
- Enne kukke ja koitu (1919)
- Laurits (1919)
- Onu Zipul (1922)
- Neetud talu (1923)

=== Stories ===
- Maimu (1889)
- Külajutud (Village Stories, five volumes, 1915–1921)
- Tiibuse Jaak Tiibuse kirjavahetus (two volumes, 1920/1923, under pseudonym Tiibuse Jaak Tiibus)

=== Memoir ===
- Vana "tuuletallaja" noorpõlve mälestused (two volumes, 1924/25)
