= Veskimäe =

Veskimäe may refer to several places in Estonia:

- Veskimäe, Tartu County, village in Mäksa Parish, Tartu County
- Veskimäe, Viljandi County, village in Abja Parish, Viljandi County
