= Sauga =

Borough in Estonia

Saugat
- Small borough
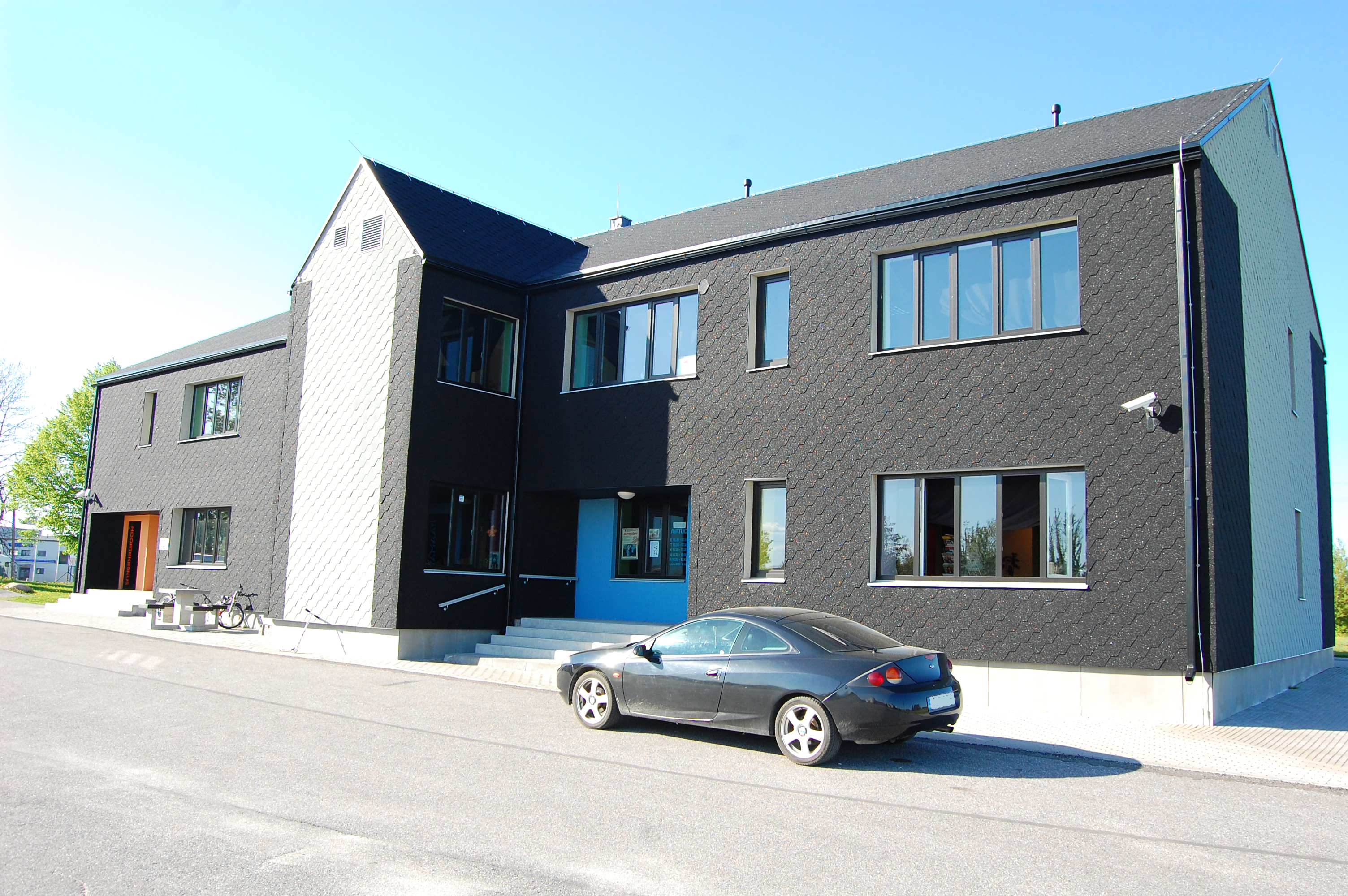
- Sauga library and youth center

- Location in Estonia
- Coordinates: 58°25′36″N 24°29′41″E
- Country: Estonia
- County: Pärnu County
- Municipality: Tori Parish

Population (08.2009)
  - Total: 1,273

Sauga (German: Sauck) is a small borough (Estonian: alevik) in Pärnu County, southwestern Estonia in Tori Parish. Between 1992 and 2017 (until the administrative reform of Estonian local governments), the town was the administrative center of Sauga Parish. The borough is situated along the Sauga River, which flows into the nearby Pärnu River. Pärnu Airport is located close to Sauga, providing convenient air access to the area.

== See also ==
- Sauga River
