= Kiisa (disambiguation) =

Kiisa may refer to several places in Estonia:

- Kiisa, small borough in Saku Parish, Harju County
- Kiisa, Pärnu County, village in Tori Parish, Pärnu County
- Kiisa, Põlva County, village in Põlva Parish, Põlva County
- Kiisa, Viljandi County, village in Viljandi Parish, Viljandi County
