= Sanga Nature Reserve =

Protected area in Estonia

- Location within Estonia
- Location: Estonia
- Coordinates: 58°07′30″N 25°05′00″E
- Area: 152 ha (380 acres)
- Established: 2005

Sanga Nature Reserve is a nature reserve which is located in Pärnu County, Estonia.

The area of the nature reserve is 152 ha.

The protected area was founded in 2005 to protect valuable habitat types and threatened species in Raamatu village (former Abja Parish) and in Leipste and Mustla village (in former Saarde Parish).
