= Hendrik Allik =

Estonian politician

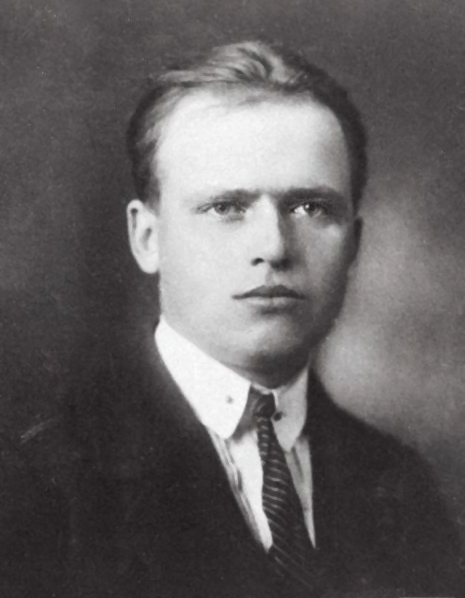
- Hendrik Allik in 1923

First Deputy Chairman of the Estonian SSR Council of Ministers
- In office 1943–1950
- Preceded by: Office established
- Succeeded by: Aleksander Ansberg
- In office 1965–1973

People's Commissars of Agriculture of the Estonian SSR
- In office 1945 – March 25, 1946

Personal details
- Born: Hendrik Allik; 15 March 1901 Veelikse, Kreis Pernau, Governorate of Livonia, Russian Empire
- Died: 8 May 1989 (aged 88) Tallinn, Estonia
- Party: Estonian Communist Party
- Spouse: Olga Lauristin
- Children: 2 (Jaak Allik)
- Education: Tallinn University of Technology

Military service
- Battles/wars: Great Patriotic War

Hendrik Allik (15 March 1901 – 8 May 1989) was an Estonian communist politician and a long-term member of the Estonian Communist Party.

== Early life ==
Hendrik Allik worked for the Baltic Cotton Factory (Estonian: Balti Puuvillavabrik) in 1916–1922 and as a contributing editor for magazines and newspapers.

During the 1920s, Allik became politically active. He was elected to the Estonian Parliament and, in November 1924, sentenced to life imprisonment in the Trial of the 149 due to the illegal nature of the Estonian Communist Party. In prison Allik continued to edit illegal communist newspapers, such as the Vangimaja Kiir.

However his imprisonment lasted only until 1938, when the president of Estonia, Konstantin Päts, pardoned the communists subsequently allowing for Allik's release. Following this Allik and other communists set up an underground organization from 1938 onwards.

== The Great Patriotic War ==
Since the communists saw president Päts as a dictator, they planned to overthrow the government. With the outbreak of World War II, Estonia was becoming a mere puppet state for the Soviet Union. On 21 June 1940 a coup d'état known as the "June Coup" (Estonian: Juunipööre) was organized and acted on, giving rise to the Estonian Communist Party. After the coup d'état the Estonian SSR was founded and Allik was elected as the People's Commissariat of Trade and Industry, which he held until June 1941.

When the German invasion of Soviet Union occurred in the summer of 1941, Allik moved to Russia. In 1942 he was appointed additional roles in Estonia and became the political commissar of the 8th Estonian Rifle Corps, taking part in hostilities near Velikiye Luki, Nevel, and Novosokolniki. He also defended the 3rd Baltic Front, and advanced from Pskov to Narva.

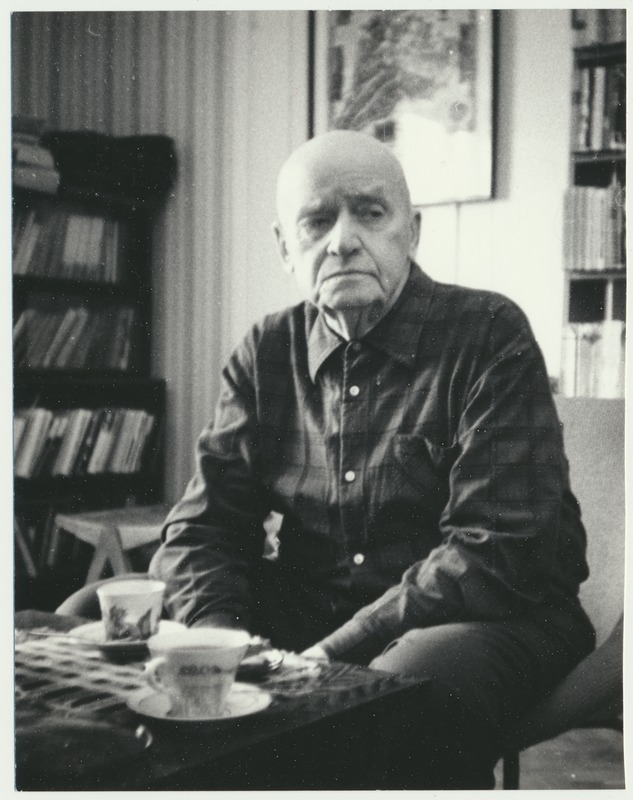
Hendrik Allik in 1980

== Activities in post-war Estonian SSR ==
As Joseph Stalin had been dissatisfied with the actions of Nikolai Karotamm, the de facto leader of the Estonian SSR, he was dismissed of his prestigious positions in March 1950. Allik, a close associate of Karotamm, was likewise stripped of his positions, sentenced to 25 years in prison, and sent to Siberia, despite receiving the Order of Lenin just months prior for his duty during the war.

Allik was released during the Khrushchev Thaw and was allowed to return to Estonia in 1955. Allik spent 20 years in prison, 15 in Estonia and five in the Soviet Union.

Allik was reinstated to his position as Deputy Chairman of the Estonian SSR Council of Ministers in 1965 and kept this position until 1973. He received awards for his duty in the Second World War and for his promotion of the culture of the Estonian SSR and its communist beliefs.

== Personal life ==
Allik married Olga Lauristin after the war and they had a son Jaak Allik (1946–), who also became a prominent member of the Estonian Communist Party. He died on 8 May 1989 in Tallinn.

== Awards ==
- Order of the Red Banner (1943)
- Order of Lenin (1950, 1965)
- Order of the October Revolution (1971)
- Order of Friendship of Peoples (1981)
- Order of the Patriotic War, 2nd Class (1985)

== See also ==
- Jaak Allik (son of Olga Lauristin and Hendrik Allik)
- Olga Lauristin (wife of Hendrik Allik 1945–1989)
