= Laatre, Viljandi County =

Village in Estonia

Laatre
- Village
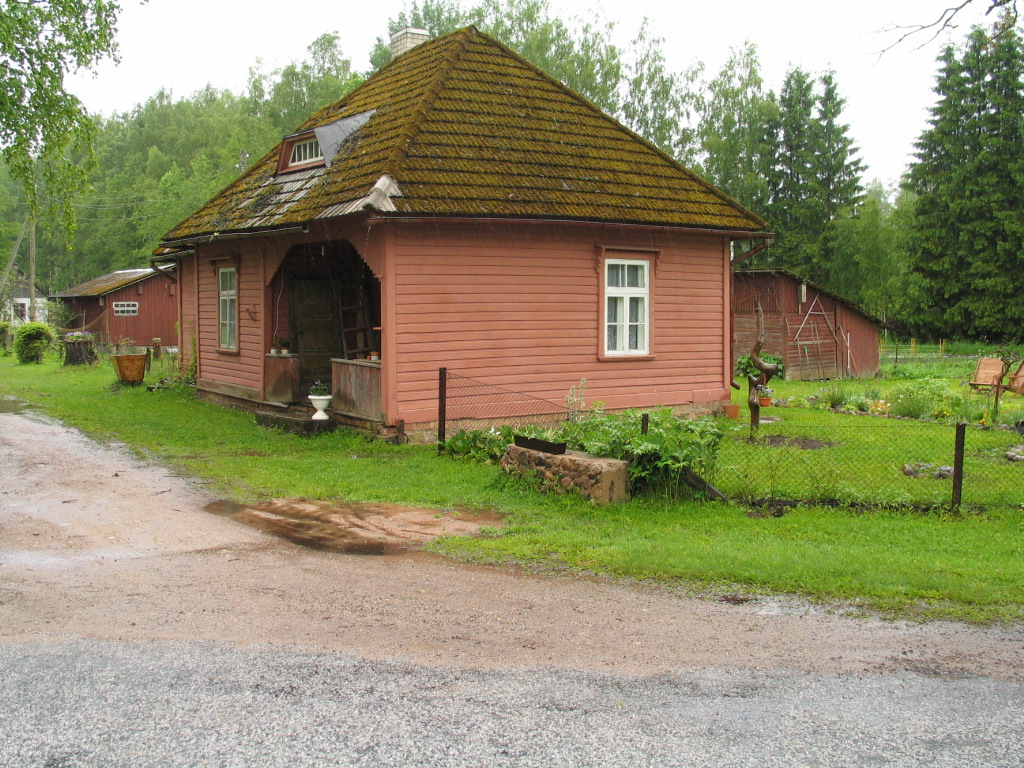
- Laatre station building

- Location in Estonia
- Coordinates: 58°00′23″N 25°16′54″E
- Country: Estonia
- County: Viljandi County
- Municipality: Mulgi Parish
- First mentioned: 1504

Government
  - Village elder: Viktor Õigus

Area
  - Total: 13.59 km^{2} (5.25 sq mi)

Population (2011)
  - Total: 48
  - Density: 3.5/km^{2} (9.1/sq mi)
- Website: www.hot.ee/l/laatrekyla

Laatre is a village in Mulgi Parish, Viljandi County in southern Estonia. Its located in a salient bordered by Latvia in the south, west and east, the only access to elsewhere Estonia is from the north. The town of Mõisaküla is located just northwest. Laatre has a population of 48 (as of 2011). It was a part of Abja Parish before 2017.

Laatre Manor (Moiseküll) was first mentioned in 1504. The name "Laatre" is derived from the Platers, the owners of the manor in the 17th century.

Writer August Kitzberg (1855–1927) was born in Laatre.
