= Urge, Pärnu County =

Village in Estonia

Coordinates: 58°25′36″N 24°39′06″E

- Village
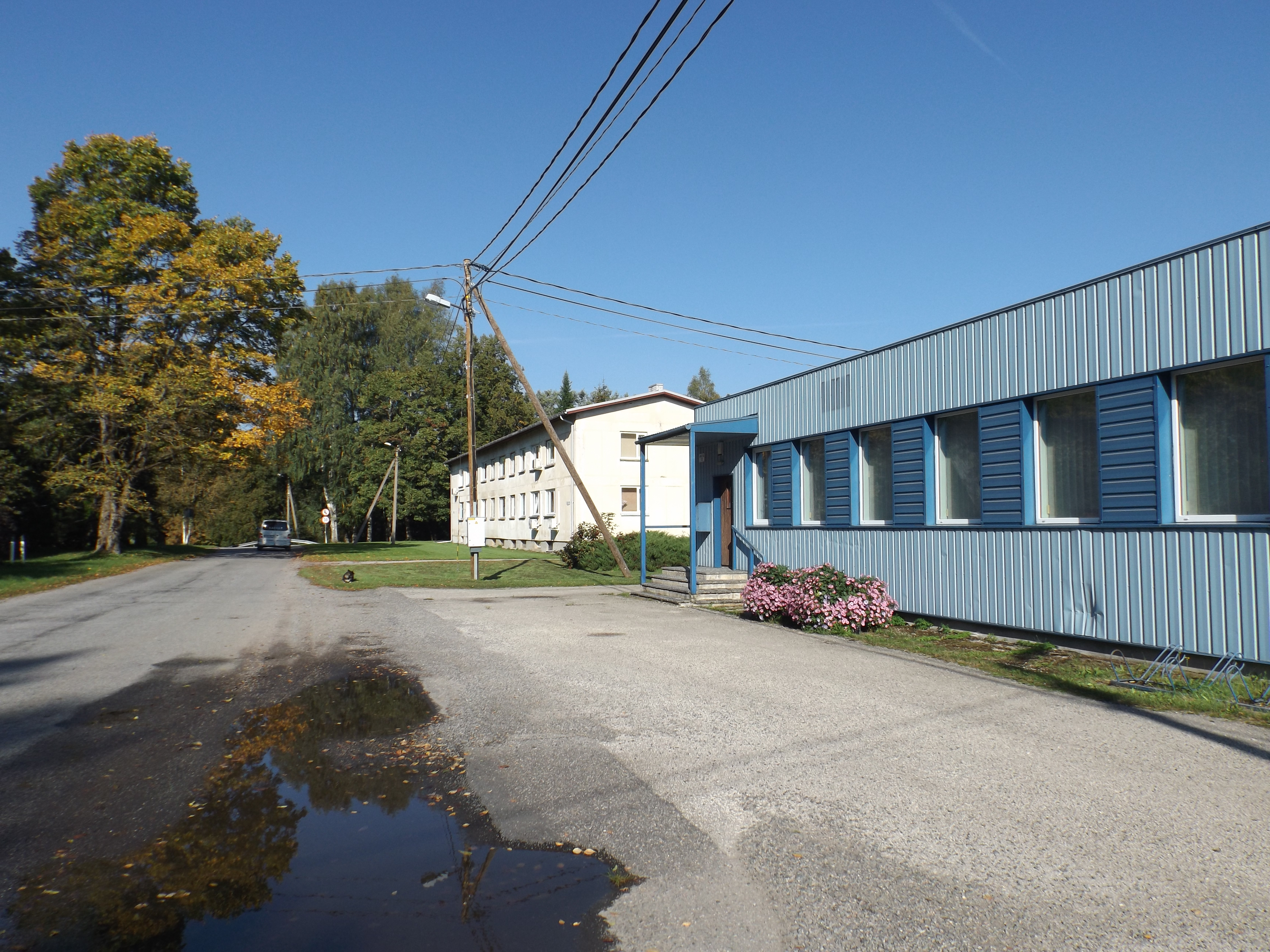
- Urge library
- Interactive map of Urge, Pärnu County
- Country: Estonia
- County: Pärnu County
- Parish: Tori Parish
- Time zone: UTC+2 (EET)
  - Summer (DST): UTC+3 (EEST)

Urge is a village in Tori Parish, Pärnu County in southwestern Estonia. Prior to the administrative reform of Estonian local governments in 2017, the village was part of Sauga Parish.
