= Põlde =

Village in Estonia

- Village
- Location within Estonia
- Coordinates: 58.1281°N 25.3886°E
- Country: Estonia
- County: Viljandi County
- Parish: Mulgi Parish
- Time zone: UTC+2 (EET)
  - Summer (DST): UTC+3 (EEST)

Põlde is a village in Mulgi Parish, Viljandi County in Estonia. It was a part of Abja Parish before 2017.
