= Jaak Allik =

Estonian politician (born 1946)

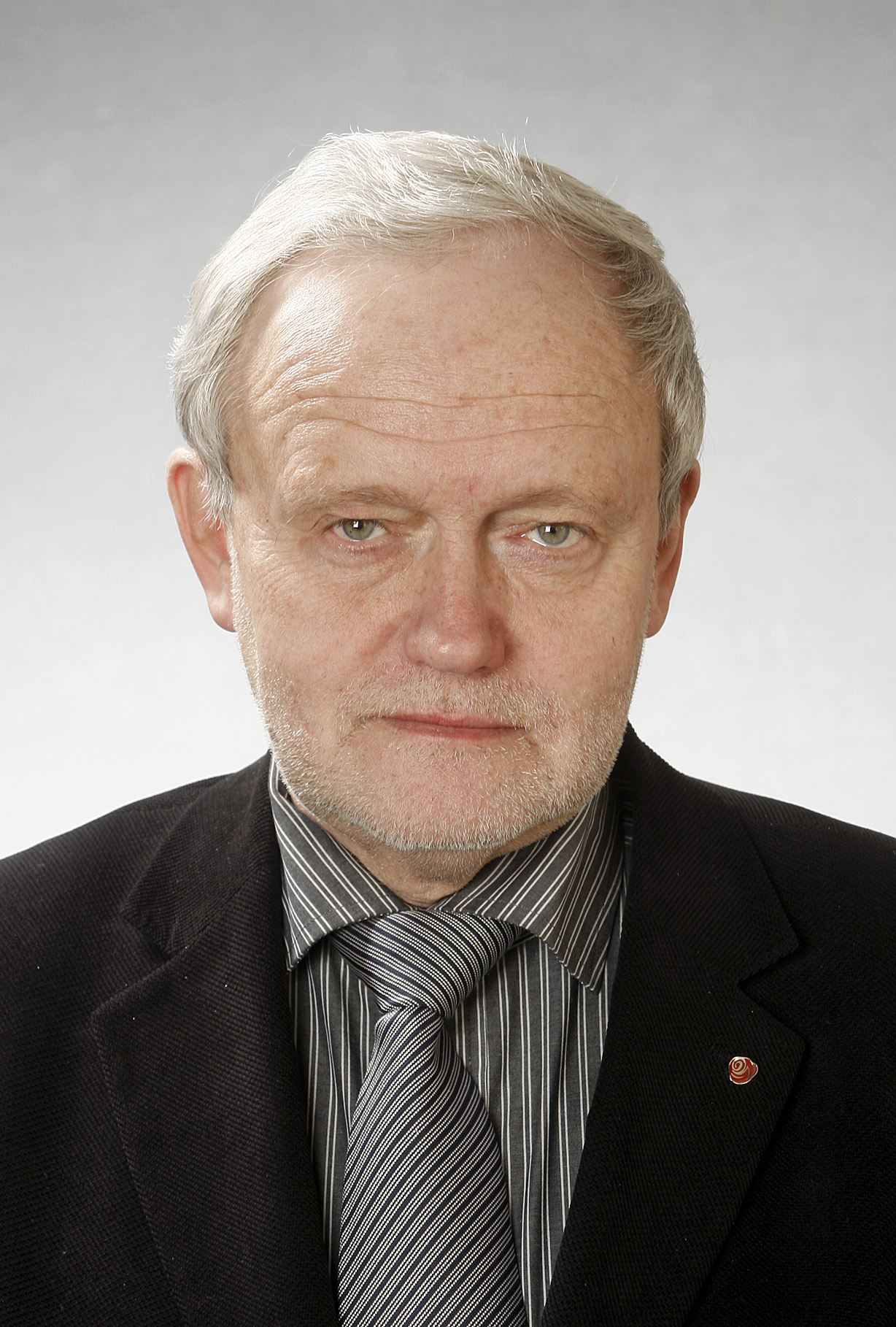
- Jaak Allik (2011)

Secretary of Ideology (EKP)
- In office March 1990 – August 1991
- Preceded by: Mikk Titma

Minister (Government Vähi II)
- In office 17 April 1995 – 6 November 1995
- Prime Minister: Tiit Vähi

Minister (Government Vähi III)
- In office 1 January 1996 – 17 March 1997
- Prime Minister: Tiit Vähi

Minister of Culture (Government Vähi III)
- In office 17 March 1997 – 1 January 1996
- Prime Minister: Tiit Vähi
- Preceded by: Jaak Aaviksoo
- Succeeded by: Jaak Allik

Minister of Culture of Estonia (Government Siimann)
- In office 17 March 1997 – 25 March 1999
- Prime Minister: Mart Siimann
- Preceded by: Jaak Allik
- Succeeded by: Signe Kivi

Personal details
- Born: 8 October 1946 (age 80) Tallinn, then part of Estonian SSR, Soviet Union
- Party: Social Democratic Party
- Education: University of Tartu
- Profession: theater critic, theater director, set designer, politician

Jaak Allik (born 6 October 1946) is an Estonian theatre critic, theatre director and politician. He is a member of the Social Democratic Party, and was previously the Estonian Minister of Culture 1995–1999 (Estonian: Eesti kultuuriminister). He was member of the VII, VIII and X Riigikogu.

== Personal life ==
Allik studied at the University of Tartu with a bachelor's degree in philosophy and a major in sociology and history, later working as a lecturer in that same university. He worked as a theater director and designer in the 1980s, becoming the set designer for Ugala.

Because Allik had been a part of the Estonian Communist Party since 1971 (and, ultimately, the CPSU), he became part of groups such as the Supreme Soviet and involved with notable Estonian communists such as Mikk Titma and Indrek Toome. After an independent Estonia Allik was mainly a theater director and theater critic but still remained in politics.

Allik's parents were the communist politicians Hendrik Allik and Olga Lauristin during the 1940s. His maternal half-sister is the sociologist and politician Marju Lauristin. His son, Mihkel Allik, has been an advisor to the Chancellor of Justice. His cousin is the architect Vilen Künnapu.

== Awards ==
- Honoured Worker of the Arts Industry of the Estonian SSR (1986)
- Order of the White Star, 4th Class (2002)
- Order of the City of Viljandi (2003)
