= Aleksander Mahlberg =

Estonian politician

Aleksander Mahlberg (1897 – 1937 in Soviet Union) was an Estonian politician. He was a member of II Riigikogu. On 7 June 1923, he resigned his position and he was replaced by Johannes Lauristin.
