= Sarja, Estonia =

Village in Estonia

- Village
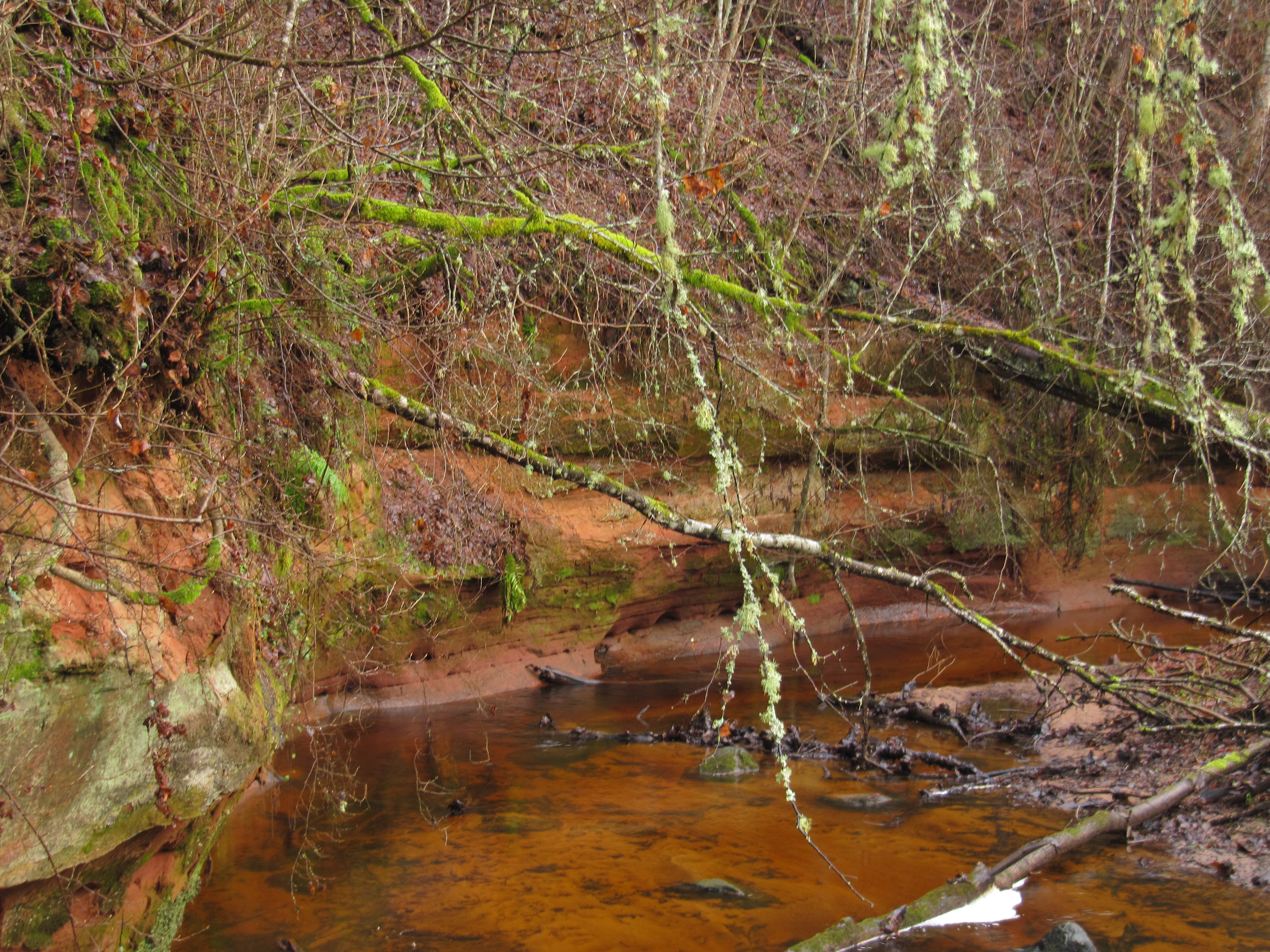
- Lüütre valley outcrop and Lüütre stream in Sarja

- Location within Estonia
- Coordinates: 58.155277777778°N 25.2425°E
- Country: Estonia
- County: Viljandi County
- Parish: Mulgi Parish
- Time zone: UTC+2 (EET)
  - Summer (DST): UTC+3 (EEST)

Sarja is a village in Mulgi Parish, Viljandi County in Estonia. It was a part of Abja Parish before 2017.
