= Marju Lauristin =

Estonian politician and sociologist

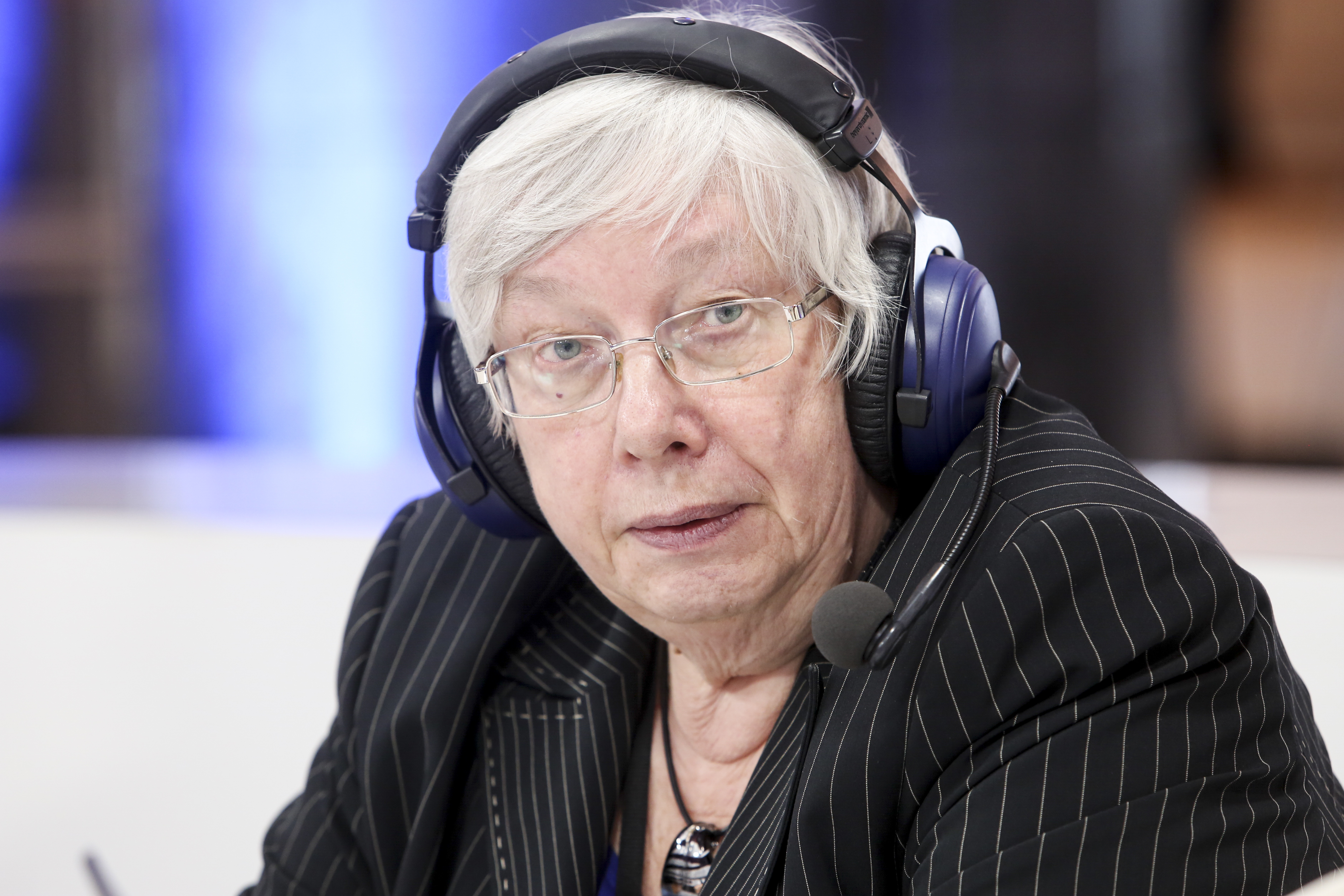

Member of the European Parliament
- In office 1 July 2014 – 6 November 2017
- Succeeded by: Ivari Padar
- Constituency: Estonia

Minister of Social Affairs
- In office 22 October 1992 – 20 September 1994
- Prime Minister: Tiit Vähi
- Preceded by: Position established
- Succeeded by: Toomas Vilosius

Member of the Estonian Parliament
- In office 20 September 1992 – 1 July 2014
- Constituency: Põlva

Personal details
- Born: 7 April 1940 (age 86) Narva, Estonia
- Party: Estonian; Social Democratic Party; EU; Party of European Socialists
- Spouse(s): Enn Roose (div.); Peeter Vihalemm (m. 1978)
- Children: 2
- Parent(s): Johannes Lauristin; Olga Lauristin (née Künnapuu)
- Relatives: Hendrik Allik (stepfather); Jaak Allik (half-brother)
- Education: University of Tartu

Marju Lauristin (born 7 April 1940) is an Estonian politician, and former Member of the European Parliament and Minister of Social Affairs. She is a member of the Social Democratic Party, part of the Party of European Socialists. Lauristin is currently a member of the Tartu city council.

== Early life and education ==
Lauristin is the daughter of the communist politicians Johannes Lauristin and Olga Lauristin (née Künnapuu), two leading politicians in the Communist Party of Estonia. Her stepfather was politician Hendrik Allik and her maternal half-brother is theatre director and politician Jaak Allik. She grew up and attended primary and secondary schools mainly in Tallinn, where she was a classmate of actress Ines Aru. She graduated from the Tartu State University (now University of Tartu) in 1966 with a degree in Journalism and Sociology of Mass Communication.

In 1976, Lauristin completed her PhD studies in journalism at Moscow University. Her thesis was focused on content analysis of newspaper texts.

Since 2003, Lauristin has been a professor of social communication at Tartu University.

== Political career ==
In October 1980, Lauristin was a signatory of the Letter of 40 Intellectuals, a public letter in which forty prominent Estonian intellectuals defended the Estonian language and protested the Russification policies of the Kremlin in Estonia. The signatories also expressed their unease against Republic-level government in harshly dealing with youth protests in Tallinn that were sparked a week earlier due to the banning of a public performance of the punk rock band Propeller.

Together with Edgar Savisaar, in 1988 Lauristin established Rahvarinne, the first large-scale independence movement in Estonia since the country's incorporation into the USSR. In 1990 she was deputy speaker of the Estonian parliament. and in 1991 she participated and supported the vote for the Estonian restoration of Independence. From 1992 to 1994 she was the minister of Social Affairs of Estonia (Estonian Social Democratic Party/'Moderates'). Lauristin was a people's deputy of the Congress of People's Deputies of the Soviet Union from the Tartu territorial electoral district No. 750 of the Estonian SSR.

=== Member of the Estonian Parliament, 1992–2014 ===
Following the 1992 elections, Lauristin served as a member of the Riigikogu, elected as a member of the People's Party Moderates (Estonian: Rahvaerakond Mõõdukad).

=== Member of the European Parliament, 2014–2017 ===
Lauristin became a Member of the European Parliament in the 2014 European elections. She has since been serving on the Committee on Civil Liberties, Justice and Home Affairs. She later joined the Parliament's special committees created to investigate the Luxleaks scandal in 2015 into the Panama Papers scandal in 2016, respectively.

Within her parliamentary group, Lauristin served as vice-chairwoman under the leadership of Gianni Pittella from 2014 until 2016.

On the Committee on Civil Liberties, Justice and Home Affairs, Lauristin serves as the Parliament’s rapporteur in the ePrivacy Regulation. In addition to her committee assignments, she is a member of the Parliament’s delegation to the EU-Ukraine Parliamentary Association Committee.

In 2017, Lauristin run for the city council of Tartu, while promising to step down from the European Parliament if she was elected. Lauristin was eventually elected with the second most votes in the electoral district. On 27 October 2017, Lauristin left the European Parliament, following the adoption in the LIBE committee of her report on the e-Privacy Regulation.

Preceded by (no such position)	Minister of Social Affairs of Estonia; 22 October 1992 – 20 September 1994	Succeeded by Toomas Vilosius
