= Johannes Lauristin =

Estonian politician

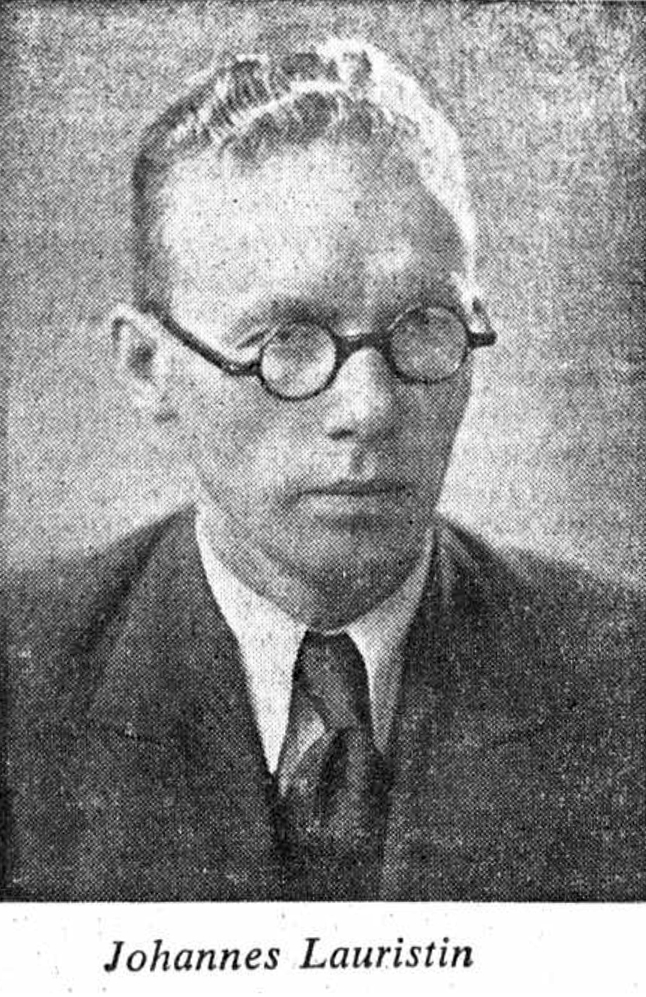
- Portrait of Lauristin, 1941

Chairman of the Council of People's Commissars of the Estonian SSR
- In office 24 August 1940 – 28 August 1941
- Preceded by: Office established
- Succeeded by: Oskar Sepre (acting)

Personal details
- Born: 29 October 1899 Tallinn, Russian Empire
- Died: 28 August 1941 (aged 41) Gulf of Finland
- Citizenship: Soviet
- Party: All-Union Communist Party (b) (1927-1941)
- Spouse: Olga Lauristin
- Children: Marju Lauristin
- Profession: Writer
- Awards: Order of Lenin (posthumously)

Johannes Lauristin (pseudonym: Juhan Madarik; 29 October 1899 – 28 August 1941) was an Estonian communist politician, activist, collaborator, writer and statesman who served as the first Chairman of the Council of People's Commissars of the Estonian Soviet Socialist Republic. His wife was communist politician Olga Lauristin and his daughter was politician Marju Lauristin.

== Biography ==
Lauristin was born in to a family of industrial workers. After the revolutionary events of 1917, he quit his work and joined the Russian Social Democratic Labour Party (Bolsheviks). In 1919, he was enrolled in the Army of the Republic of Estonia and participated in the War of Independence.

After independence, Lauristin became a member of the illegal Estonian Communist Youth Union and worked as an editor in various underground newspapers and magazines. In the same year, he joined the Communist Party of Estonia and became a member of the Central Council of the Estonian Workers' General Union.

He was a member of the II Riigikogu, having been a member since 7 June 1923, replacing Aleksander Mahlberg. On 27 June 1923, he resigned his position and was replaced by Aleksander Janson.

After the banning of the Communist Party of Estonia, Lauristin was arrested and was one the defendants involved with the trial of the 149 and was sentenced to six years of forced labor. He was released, however, after an amnesty and remained in Estonia alongside other activists and once again engaged in underground activities.

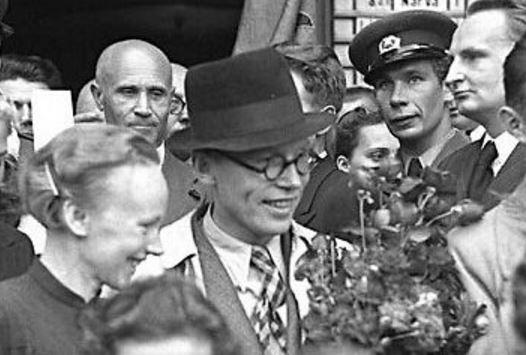
Johannes and Olga Lauristin in 1940

Upon the June Coup which established Soviet power in Estonia, Johannes Lauristin was the secretary of the Communist Party of Estonia from June to July 1940 . From August 25, 1940, until the withdrawal of Soviet troops from Estonia in the summer of 1941, he was the chairman of the Council of People's Commissars of the Estonian SSR, as well as the secretary of the Central Committee of the ECP and a representative to the Supreme Soviet of the Soviet Union.

After the start of the German-Soviet War in the summer of 1941, Lauristin was appointed deputy chairman of the Republican Defense Committee of the Estonian SSR.

Johannes Lauristin died during the Soviet evacuation of Tallinn; however, the circumstances of his death are unclear. According to the official Soviet version, he died on the Yakov Sverdlov destroyer after it was struck by a mine. According to the historian Mati Õun, he was executed by fellow communist officials for disobeying Stalin's war orders; however, this version is also contested.

Lauristin was awarded the Order of Lenin posthumously in 1946.
