= Sauga Parish =

Former municipality of Estonia

Sauga Parish Sauga vald
- Former municipality of Estonia
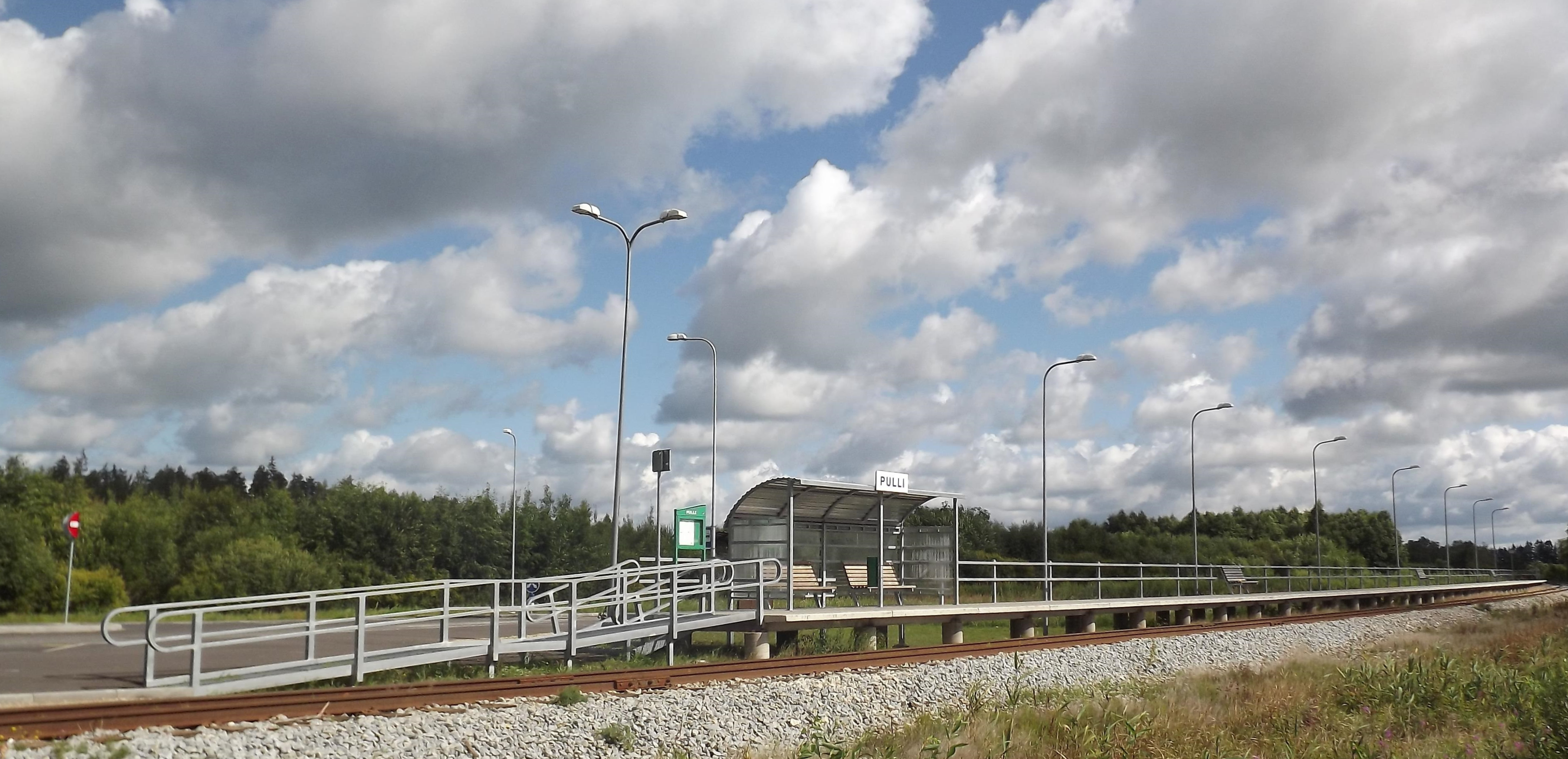
- Pulli railway stop

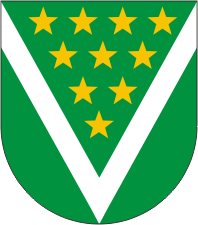
- Flag Coat of arms

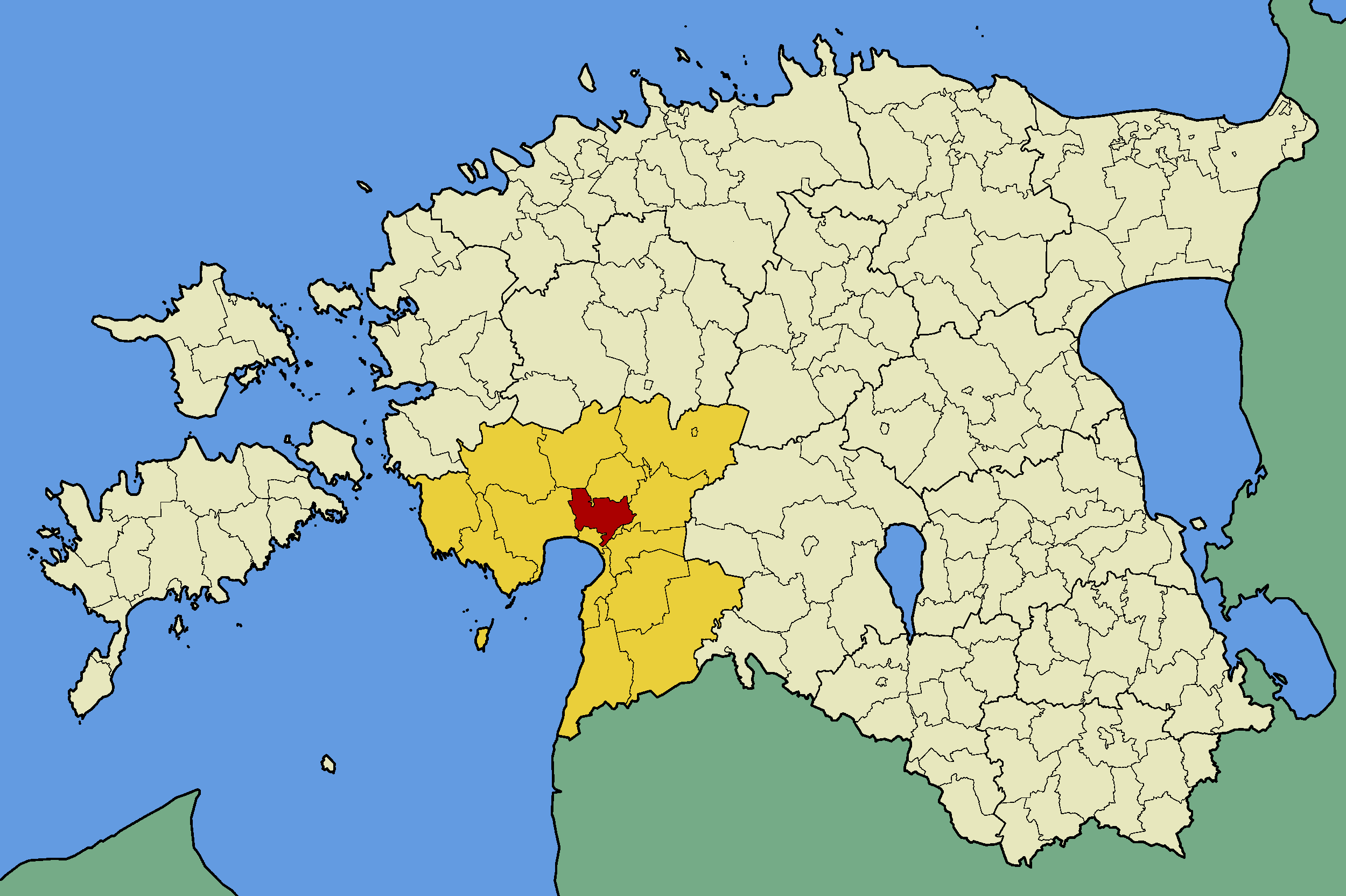
- Sauga Parish within Pärnu County.
- Country: Estonia
- County: Pärnu County
- Administrative centre: Sauga

Government
  - Mayor: Lembit Rebane

Area
  - Total: 164.8 km^{2} (63.6 sq mi)

Population (01.01.2006)
  - Total: 2,564
  - Density: 15.56/km^{2} (40.30/sq mi)
- Website: www.sauga.ee

Sauga Parish was located at the Pärnu County Center, Estonia. Its south neighbour was Pärnu city, west neighbour Audru Parish; its north side resided with Halinga and Are, its east side with town of Sindi.

Sauga Parish stayed on the lower shelf, between Sauga and Pärnu river area, grabbing the biggest part of Nurme fen and whole Rääma fen. The wood and fen comprised 58% of the parish's territory, which gave the parish its major resource, peak.

The parish had 10 villages and one centre, where the total population is 3246 (01.08.2006). The average population density was 19.5 people for square kilometer.

== Settlements ==
Small borough

Sauga

Villages

Eametsa - Kiisa - Kilksama - Nurme - Pulli - Räägu - Rütavere - Tammiste - Urge - Vainu
