= Kilksama =

Village in Estonia

Coordinates: 58°26′54″N 24°36′06″E

- Village
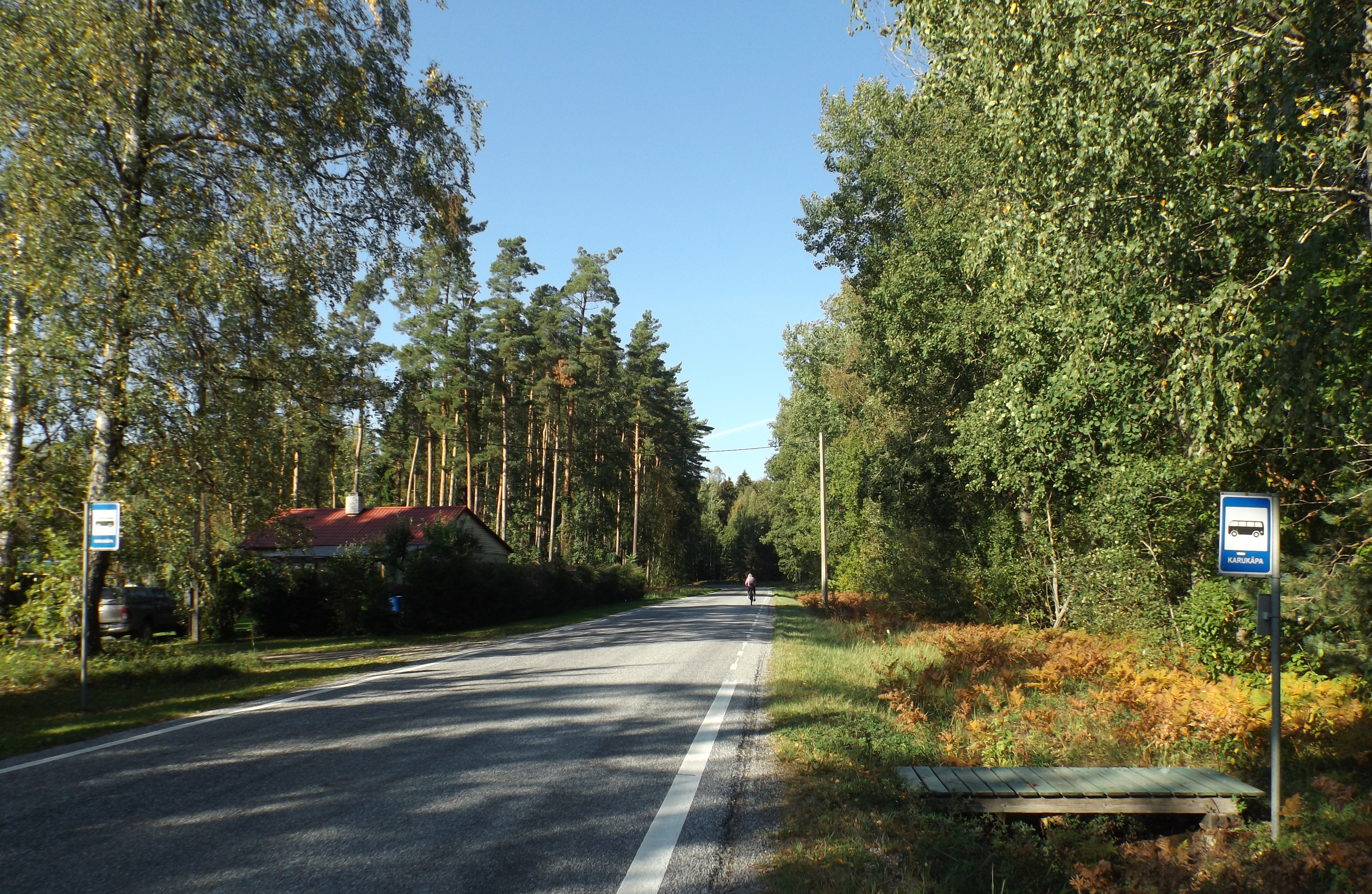
- Bus stop in Kilksama
- Interactive map of Kilksama
- Country: Estonia
- County: Pärnu County
- Parish: Tori Parish
- Time zone: UTC+2 (EET)
  - Summer (DST): UTC+3 (EEST)

Kilksama is a village in Tori Parish, Pärnu County in southwestern Estonia. Prior to the administrative reform of Estonian local governments in 2017, the village was part of Sauga Parish.
