= Vainu, Pärnu County =

Village in Estonia

Coordinates: 58°24′51″N 24°38′53″E

- Village
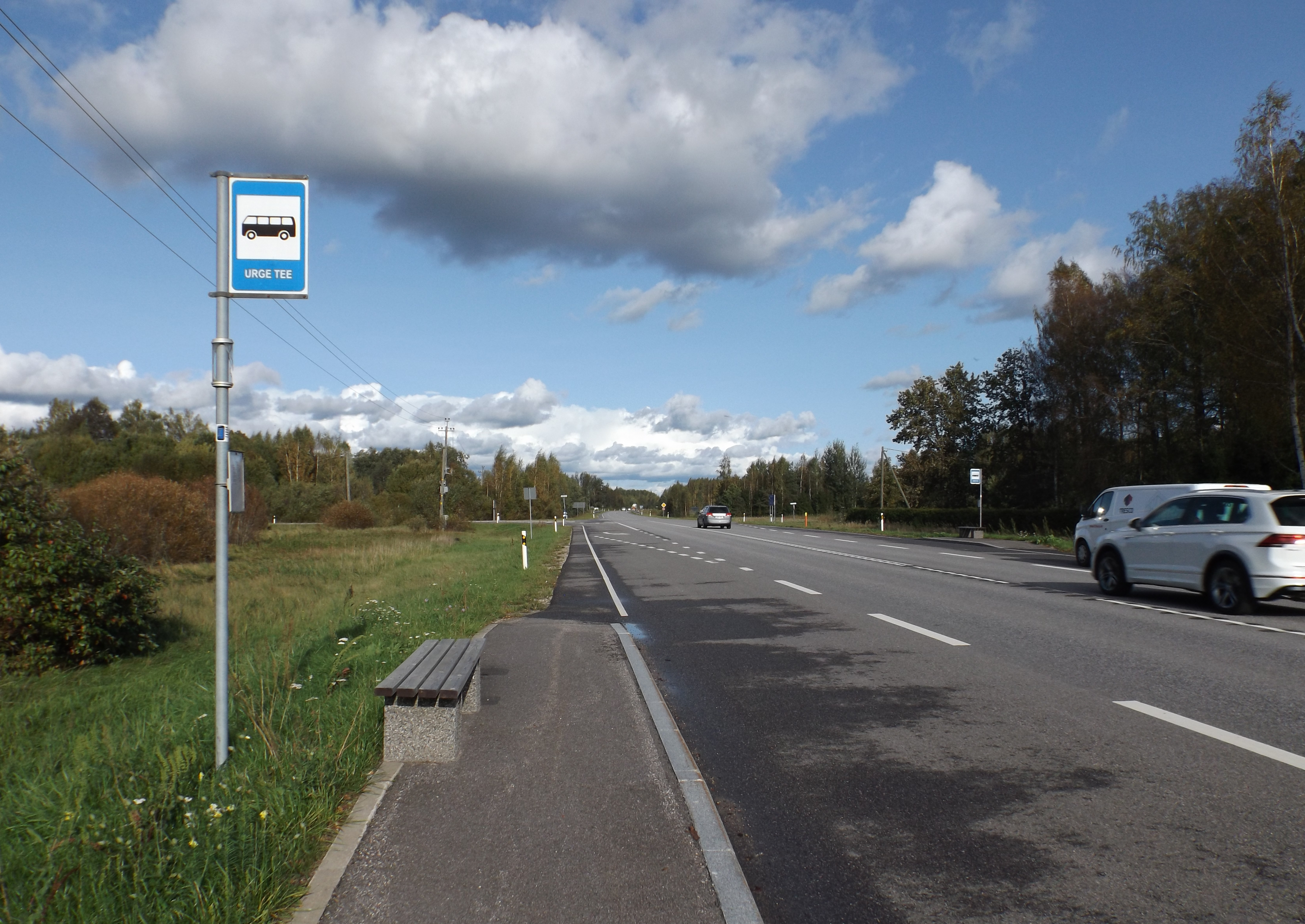
- Bus stop in Vainu
- Interactive map of Vainu, Pärnu County
- Country: Estonia
- County: Pärnu County
- Parish: Tori Parish
- Time zone: UTC+2 (EET)
  - Summer (DST): UTC+3 (EEST)

Vainu is a village in Tori Parish, Pärnu County in southwestern Estonia. Prior to the administrative reform of Estonian local governments in 2017, the village was part of Sauga Parish.
