= Räägu, Pärnu County =

Village in Estonia

Coordinates: 58°28′20″N 24°34′07″E

- Village
- Interactive map of Räägu, Pärnu County
- Country: Estonia
- County: Pärnu County
- Parish: Tori Parish
- Time zone: UTC+2 (EET)
  - Summer (DST): UTC+3 (EEST)

Räägu is a village in Tori Parish, Pärnu County in southwestern Estonia. Prior to the administrative reform of Estonian local governments in 2017, the village was part of Sauga Parish.
