= Olga Lauristin =

Soviet Estonian politician (1903–2005)

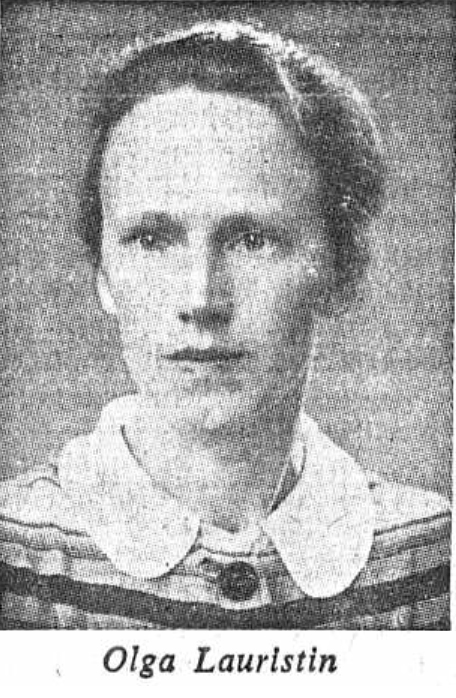

Personal details
- Born: Olga Künnapuu; 28 April 1903 Kolga Parish (now Kuusalu Parish), Kreis Harrien, Governorate of Estonia
- Died: 25 June 2005 (aged 102) Tartu, Estonia
- Party: Communist Party of Estonia
- Spouse(s): Johannes Lauristin; Hendrik Allik
- Children: Marju Lauristin; Jaak Allik
- Education: University of Tartu
- Awards: Order of the Red Banner of Labour; Order of Friendship of Peoples; Order of the October Revolution

Olga Lauristin (née Künnapuu; 28 April 1903 Kolga Parish (now Kuusalu Parish), Kreis Harrien – 25 June 2005) was a Soviet Estonian politician and collaborator.

== Early life ==
Olga Künnapuu's father, Anton Künnapuu, was a schoolmaster. In 1919, her father, who held left wing views, died after an accident with a truck. He fought with the Russian Soviets during the Estonian War of Independence.

== Career ==
In 1920, Olga Künnapuu became a member of the Communist Party of Estonia while at school. From August 1922, she studied philosophy at the university of Tartu and became involved with the Estonian Workers' Party. During the spring of 1921, she met local communists Jaan Kreuks and Vilhelmine Klementi and began to organise youth cells for the communist party.

She was arrested by the security police on 21 January 1924.

Following the trial of the 149, she was sentenced to forced labor for life in November 1924 because she belonged to the Communist Party. Released in 1939, she married Johannes Lauristin who was also sentenced at the same trial as her.

During the Soviet evacuation of Tallinn in August 1941, she was evacuated to Russia and her husband died on a ship to Leningrad in August 1941 that struck a mine in the Gulf of Finland.

From 1944 until 1947, she was minister of social welfare as she returned to Estonia.

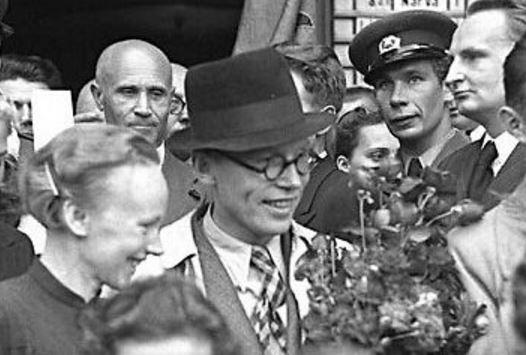
Johannes and Olga Lauristin in 1940

== Family ==
Her first husband was the politician Johannes Lauristin and her daughter was the politician and media researcher Marju Lauristin. She later married Hendrik Allik in 1945, and the couple had a son, the theatre critic and director and politician Jaak Allik in 1946. The couple remained married until Allik's death in 1989.
