= Veskimäe, Tartu County =

Village in Estonia

Coordinates: 58°22′40″N 27°01′17″E

- Village
- Interactive map of Veskimäe, Tartu County
- Country: Estonia
- County: Tartu County
- Parish: Kastre Parish
- Time zone: UTC+2 (EET)
  - Summer (DST): UTC+3 (EEST)

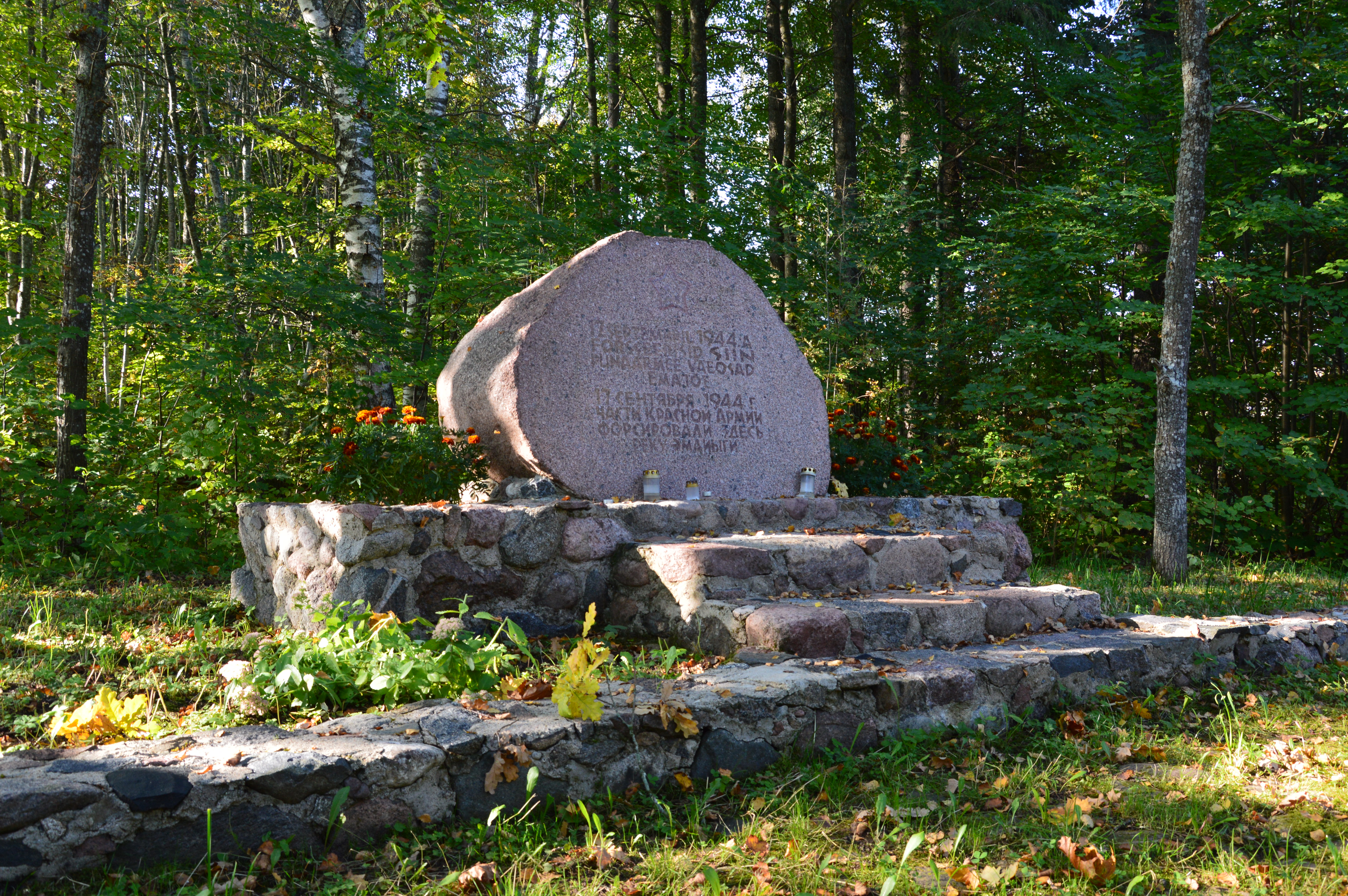
Memorial stone for the river Ema.

Veskimäe is a village in Kastre Parish, Tartu County in eastern Estonia.
