= Sauga (river) =

River in Estonia

Coordinates: 58°23′19″N 24°29′05″E

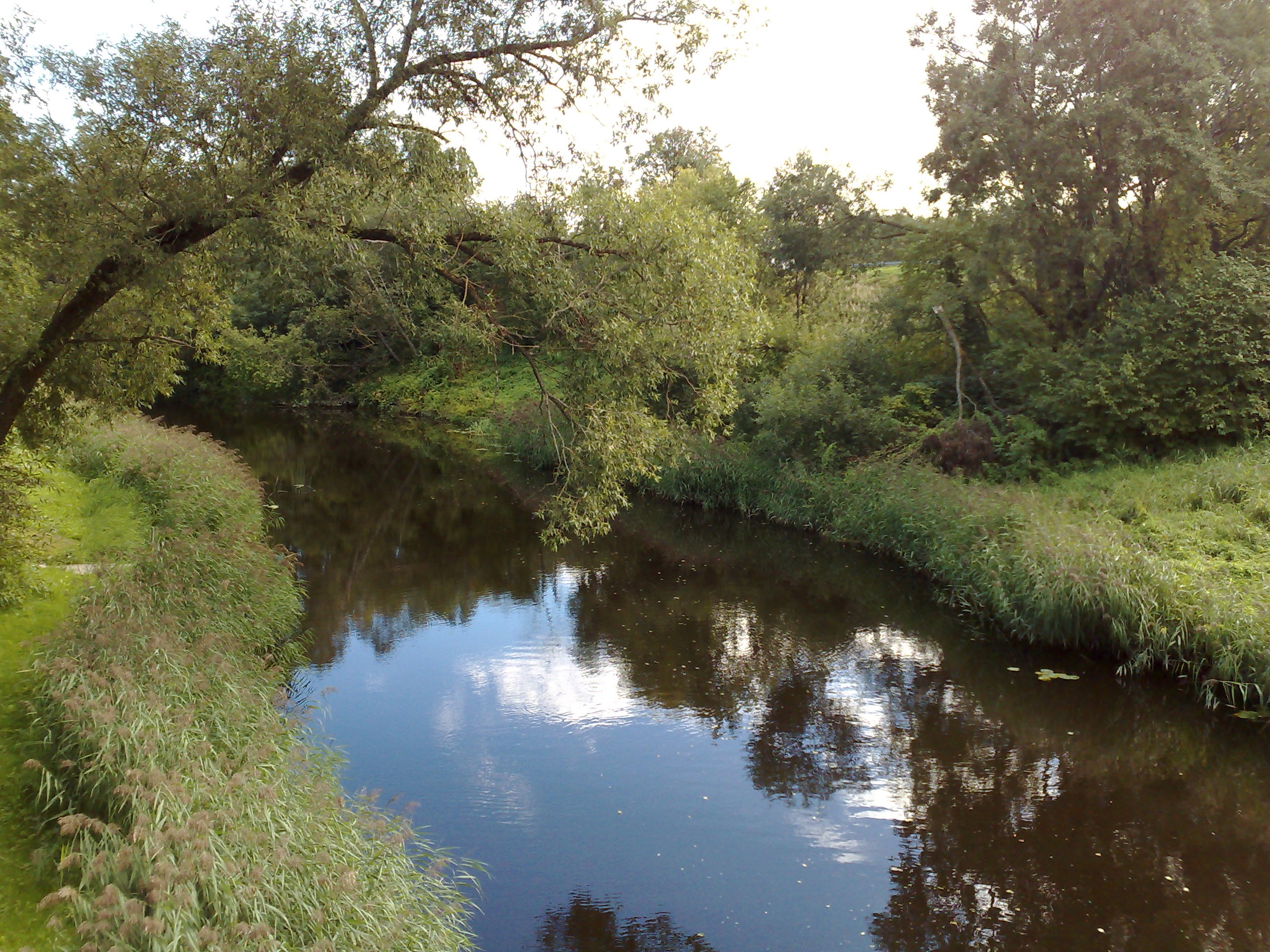
The Sauga River

Drone video of the Sauga River and bridge in Sauga (June 2022)

The Sauga is a right tributary of the Pärnu. It is 79.2 km long, starting near Järvakandi and flowing into the Pärnu River in Pärnu. It has a drainage area of 576.5 km^{2}.

The river is a home to a variety of fish, including northern pike, common roach, and yellow perch.
