= Atika (cigarette) =

German cigarette brand

- Product type: Cigarette
- Produced by: Reemtsma, a subsidiary of Imperial Tobacco
- Country: German Empire
- Introduced: 1889
- Discontinued: 2016; 10 years ago
- Markets: See Markets
- Previous owners: Cigarettenfabrik Dresden
- Tagline: See Slogans

Atika (or ATIKAH as it was originally called) was a German cigarette brand which was owned and manufactured by Reemtsma, a subsidiary of Imperial Tobacco. Production of cigarettes under the "Atika" brand was discontinued in 2016.

== History ==
Atika, which was then still called ATIKAH, was launched in 1889 in the founding year of the "Cigarettenfabrik Dresden". Genuine Turkish packaging inscription gave this new cigarette brand an exotic look from other brands at the time, and was mainly smoked by upper-class Germans. After the takeover of the Cigarettenfabrik Dresden in 1925, the brand was owned by Reemtsma. In 1943, the brand disappeared from the market and in 1945 production was stopped altogether.

An old German pack of Atika cigarettes, with a German text warning at bottom

In 1964, Reemtsma filed a trademark for the future re-introduction of the Atika brand. On Tuesday, 30 June 1964, a federal trademark registration was filed for the brand, which was accepted and registered on 16 March 1965. It expired on 16 June 1985.

In order to assert itself in the fast-growing segment of low-nicotine cigarettes, the manufacturer Reemtsma introduced a deliberately high-priced cigarette in 1966 under the name "Atika", which was still known from the pre-war period in 1966. Since low-nicotine tobaccos have a rather weak taste, the mixture was soaked to flavour it with various flavours ("spicy tobacco"). The advertising slogan "It has always been a bit more expensive to have a special taste" has become commonplace and is hardly associated with the cigarette brand anymore.

Various advertising material was made to promote the traditional ATIKAH cigarettes as well as the newer Atika brand, such as promotional posters and a mirror.

In May 2016, the Reemtsma Group announced that it had discontinued production of the Atika brand, due to the decision of Reemtsma to focus more on its main, big brands and because the EU introduced new packaging with shock picture warnings.

== Slogans ==
Various slogans were created for the Atika brand. Here is an overview of all the slogans used:

- "Es war schon immer etwas teurer, einen besonderen Geschmack zu haben." ("It has always been a bit more expensive to have a special taste." - 1967
- "Aus Geschmack am Leichten." ("From taste to lightness.") - 1971
- "Schöne neue Welt des Genießens." ("Beautiful new world of enjoyment.") - 1973
- "Die leichte Cigarette mit dem besonderen Geschmack." ("The light cigarette with the special taste.") - 1973
- "Besonders leicht. Besonders im Geschmack: Atika heute." ("Especially light. Especially in the taste: Atika today.") - 1974
- "Mit Würztabaken. Im Rauch nikotinarm." ("With seasoning tobaccos. Low in nicotine in the smoke.") - 1975
- "Würzig und leicht, mit den wertvollsten Tabaken der Welt." ("Spicy and light, with the most valuable tobaccos in the world.") - 1975
- "Wir lieben's leichter ... und mit Geschmack." ("We love it lighter ... and with taste.") - 1978
- "Wir lieben's leicht ... und mit Geschmack." ("We love it light ... and with taste.") - 1979
- "Der besondere Geschmack" ("The special taste") - 1982

== Markets ==
Atika's main market was Germany and its other markets were Netherlands, France, Switzerland and Italy.

== See also ==
- Tobacco smoking
- Electronic cigarette
- Herbal cigarette
