= Abja Parish =

Municipality of Estonia

Coordinates: 58°7′34″N 25°21′32″E

Abja Parish Abja vald
- Former municipality
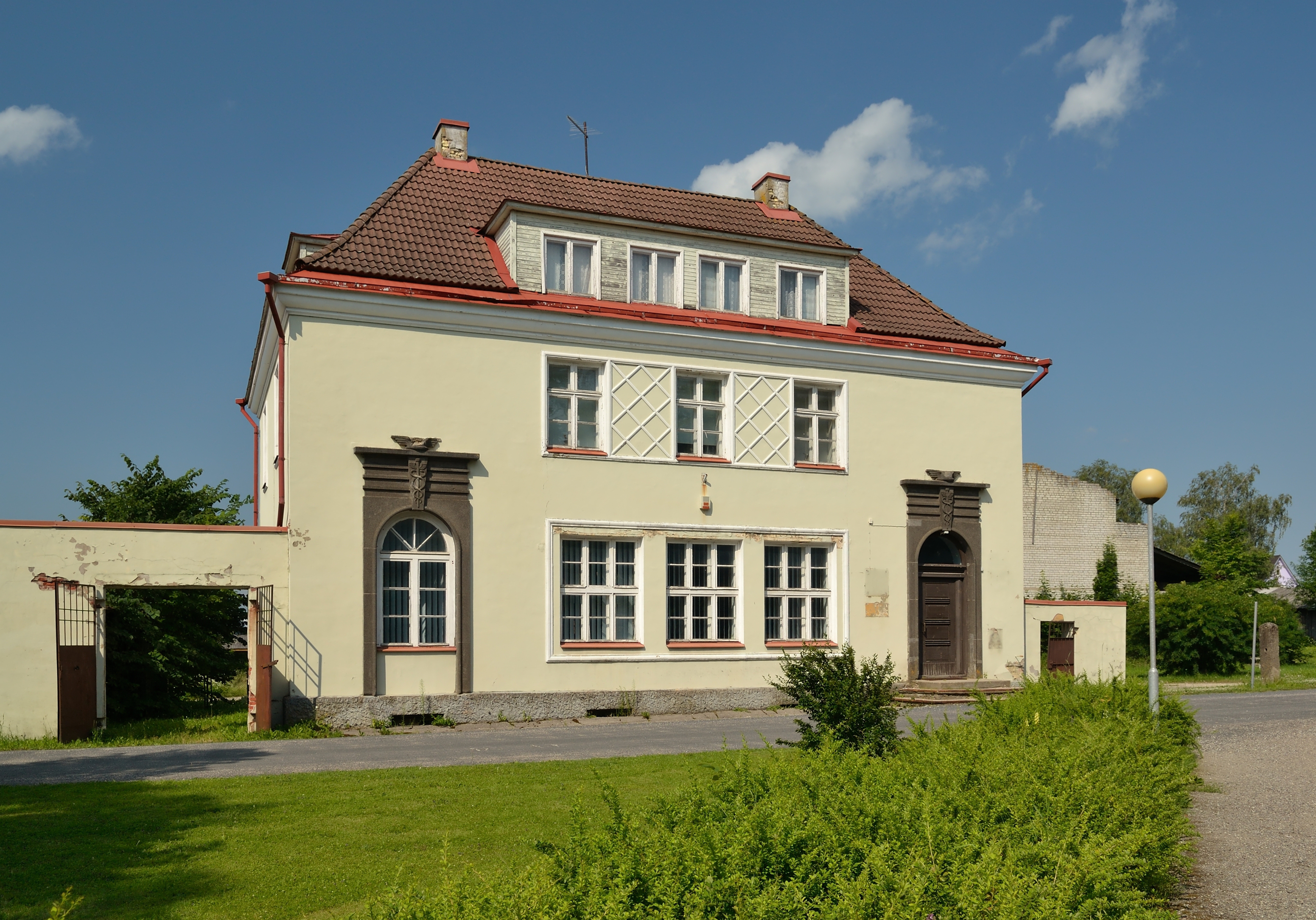
- Abja-Paluoja post office

- Flag Coat of arms

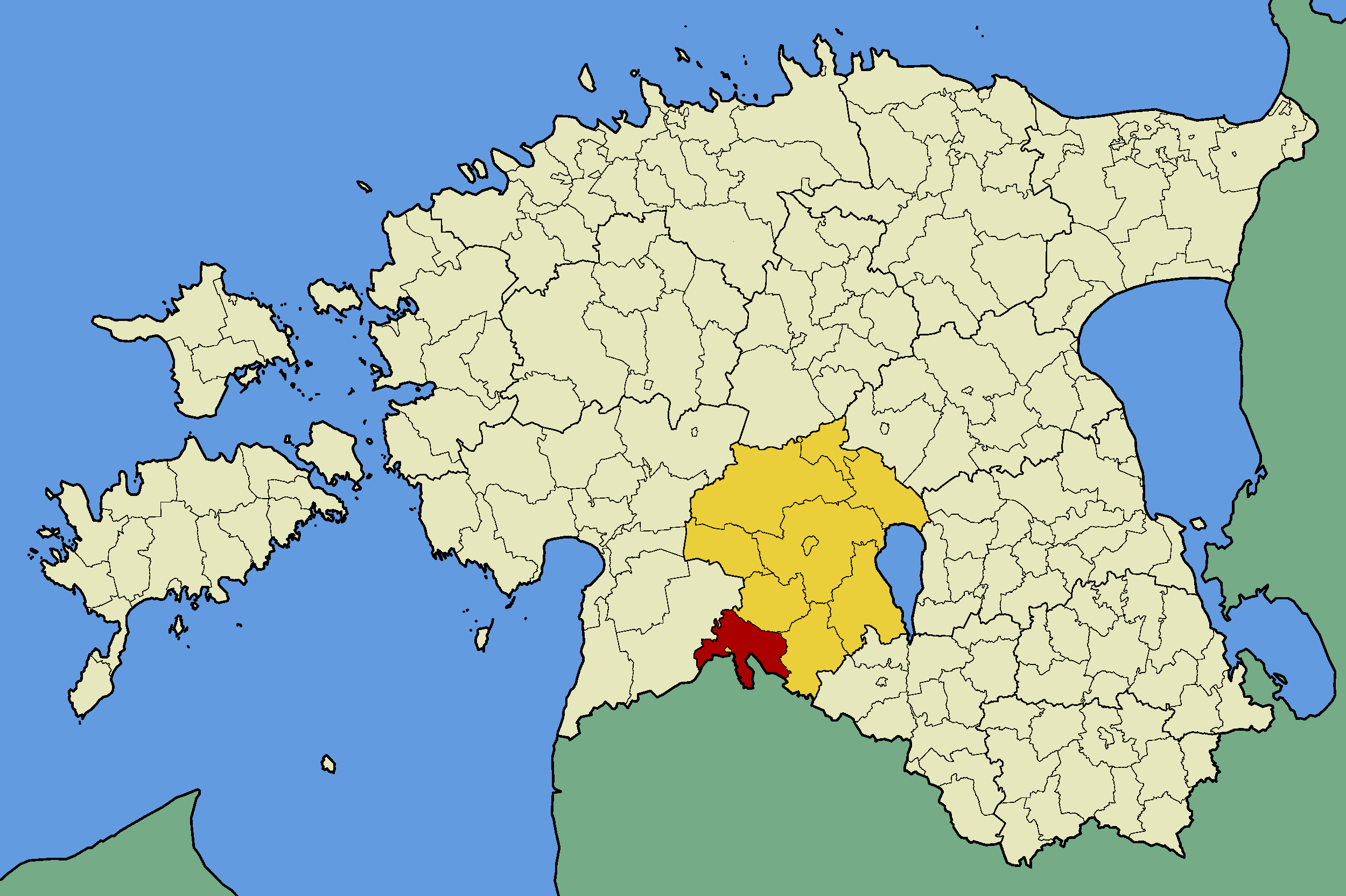
- Abja Parish in 2009 within Viljandi County.
- Country: Estonia
- County: Viljandi County
- Administrative centre: Abja-Paluoja

Area
  - Total: 290.21 km^{2} (112.05 sq mi)

Population (01.01.2009)
  - Total: 2,719
  - Density: 9.369/km^{2} (24.27/sq mi)
- Website: www.abja.ee

Abja Parish (Estonian: Abja vald) was a rural municipality of Estonia, in Viljandi County. In 2009, it had a population of 2,719 (as of 1 January 2009) and an area of 290.21 km^{2} (112 sq mi).

After the municipal elections held on 15 October 2017, Abja Parish was merged with Halliste and Karksi parishes and the town of Mõisaküla to form a new Mulgi Parish.

== Settlements ==
Town

Abja-Paluoja

Villages

Abja-Vanamõisa - Abjaku - Atika - Kamara - Laatre - Lasari - Penuja - Põlde - Räägu - Raamatu - Saate - Sarja - Umbsoo - Veelikse - Veskimäe

== Twinnings ==
- Nummi-Pusula, Finland (2004)
