= Atika, Estonia =

Village in Estonia

- Village
- Location within Estonia
- Coordinates: 58.116666666667°N 25.447222222222°E
- Country: Estonia
- County: Viljandi County
- Parish: Mulgi Parish
- Time zone: UTC+2 (EET)
  - Summer (DST): UTC+3 (EEST)

Atika is a village in Mulgi Parish, Viljandi County of Estonia. It was a part of Abja Parish before 2017.
