= Kiisa, Pärnu County =

Village in Estonia

Kiisa
- Village
- Location within Estonia
- Coordinates: 58°24′14″N 24°37′36″E
- Country: Estonia
- County: Pärnu County
- Parish: Tori Parish
- Time zone: UTC+2 (EET)
  - Summer (DST): UTC+3 (EEST)

Kiisa is a village in Tori Parish, Pärnu County in southwestern Estonia. Prior to the administrative reform of Estonian local governments in 2017, the village was part of Sauga Parish.
