= 1940 Estonian coup d'état =

- Part of the Soviet occupation of the Baltic states
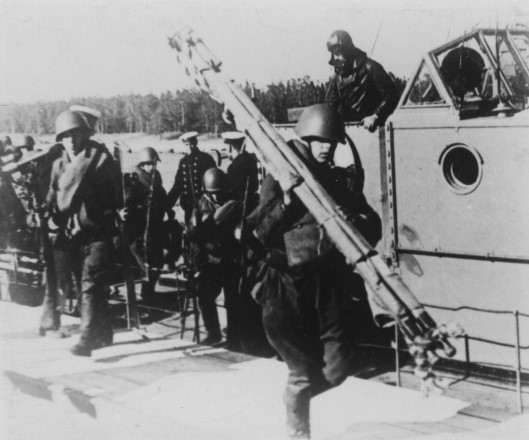
- Red Army soldiers landing on Naissaar, 1940
Date	16–21 June 1940
Location	Tallinn, Estonia
Result	Soviet-backed government installed; Estonia occupied and later annexed

Belligerents
Soviet Union	Estonia

The 1940 Estonian coup d'état, also known as the June coup, (Note: Estonian: Juunipööre, ; Russian: Июньский переворот.) or in Soviet historiography, the June Revolution of 1940, (Note: Estonian: 1940. aasta juunirevolutsioon, ; Russian: Июньская революция 1940 года.) was the Soviet-backed replacement of the government of the Republic of Estonia on 21 June 1940. Following the issuance of an ultimatum to the Estonians on 16 June, Soviet troops occupied Estonia on 17 June. Soviet emissary Andrei Zhdanov then pressured Estonian president Konstantin Päts to install a new government led by Johannes Vares. With the coup, Estonia effectively lost its sovereignty, and rigged elections took place in July, with Estonia incorporated formally into the USSR on 6 August 1940. Both Estonia and many historians have viewed the entire episode as a military occupation and illegal annexation, whereas Soviet historiography presented it as a voluntary socialist revolution.

== Background ==
Estonia declared independence in February 1918 and won the Estonian War of Independence against Soviet Russia. The 1920 Treaty of Tartu recognized Estonian independence. From 1934, Konstantin Päts ruled in an authoritarian manner, having declared a state of national emergency and suspended political parties.

Under the secret protocol of the August 1939 Molotov–Ribbentrop Pact, Estonia was placed in the Soviet sphere of influence. In September–October 1939, the Soviet Union compelled Estonia to sign a "mutual assistance treaty" allowing Soviet military bases on Estonian territory, with about 25,000 Soviet troops stationed there by October 1939.

== Soviet military preparations and ultimatum ==
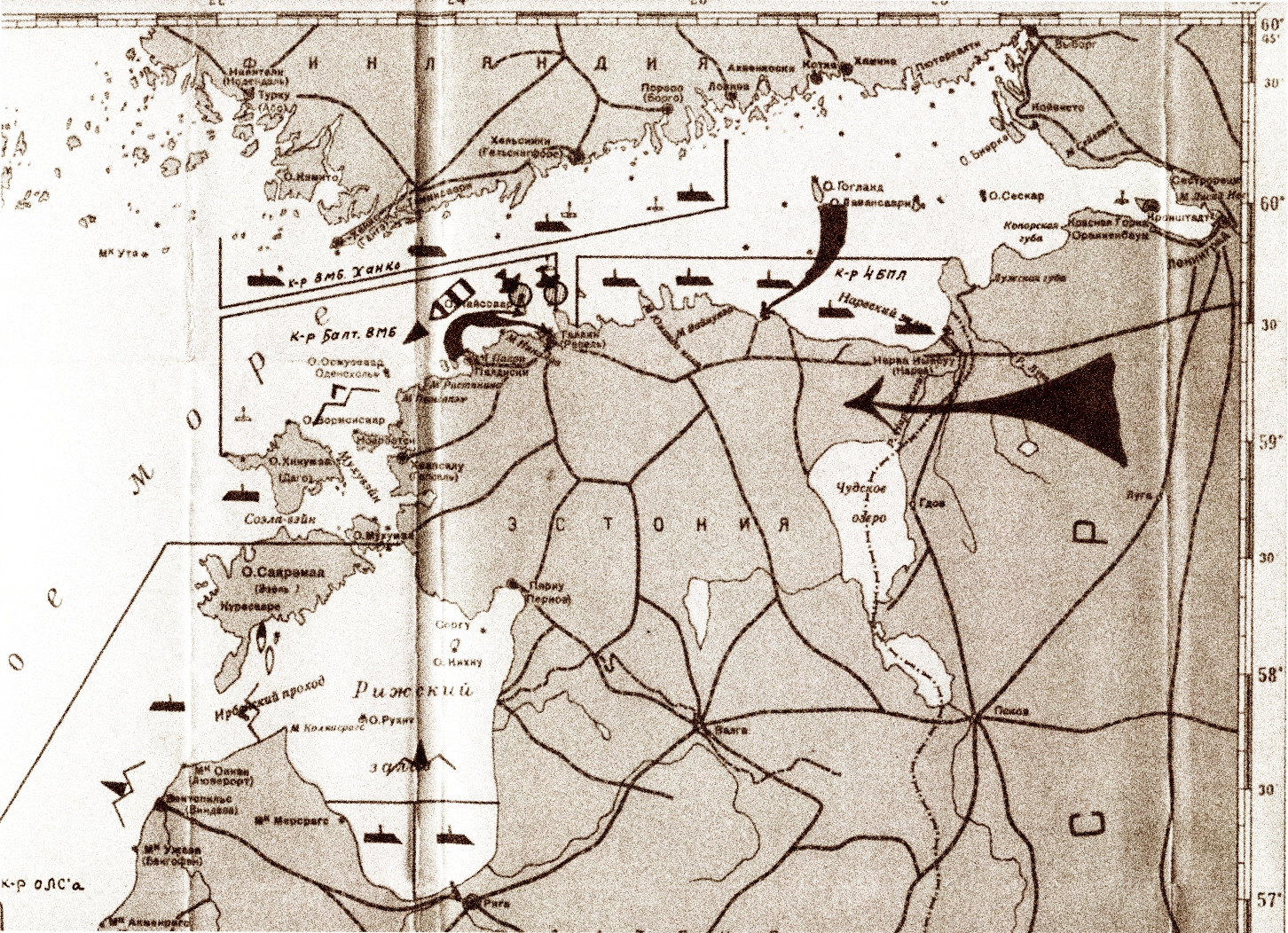
Schematics of the Soviet military blockade and invasion of Estonia and Latvia in 1940.

Soviet military planning against the Baltic states intensified in early June 1940. Troops in the Leningrad, Kalinin and Belarus Special Military Districts were placed on combat readiness, prisoner-of-war camps were prepared for Baltic prisoners, and the Baltic Fleet was assigned to support an invasion. A combat order of the 8th Army, drafted on 13 June 1940, directed Soviet forces to cross the Estonian border and "isolate the Estonian Army from the Latvian Army and to annihilate it". The plan also called for a landing across Lake Peipus and air strikes against Estonian airfields.

On 12 June, the Soviet Union occupied the island of Naissaar and closed the Bay of Tallinn. A sea and air blockade followed on 14 June. On 16 June 1940, Soviet Foreign Minister Vyacheslav Molotov presented an ultimatum to the Estonian ambassador in Moscow, accusing Estonia of violating the mutual assistance treaty and demanding a new government and the admission of additional Red Army troops. Estonia was given until 11 p.m. to reply. According to the order of the People's Commissar for Defence, the Baltic Fleet was to be ready to capture Estonian and Latvian warships and to land troops at Paldiski and Tallinn. The Estonian government decided to accept the ultimatum, judging armed resistance to be hopeless.

== Coup of 21 June ==
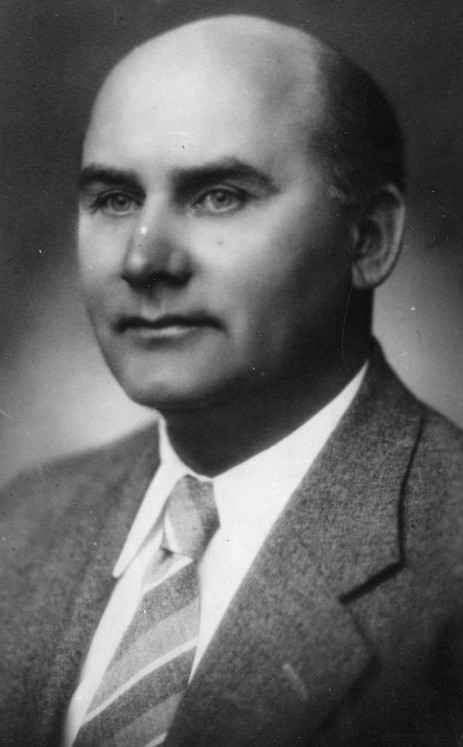
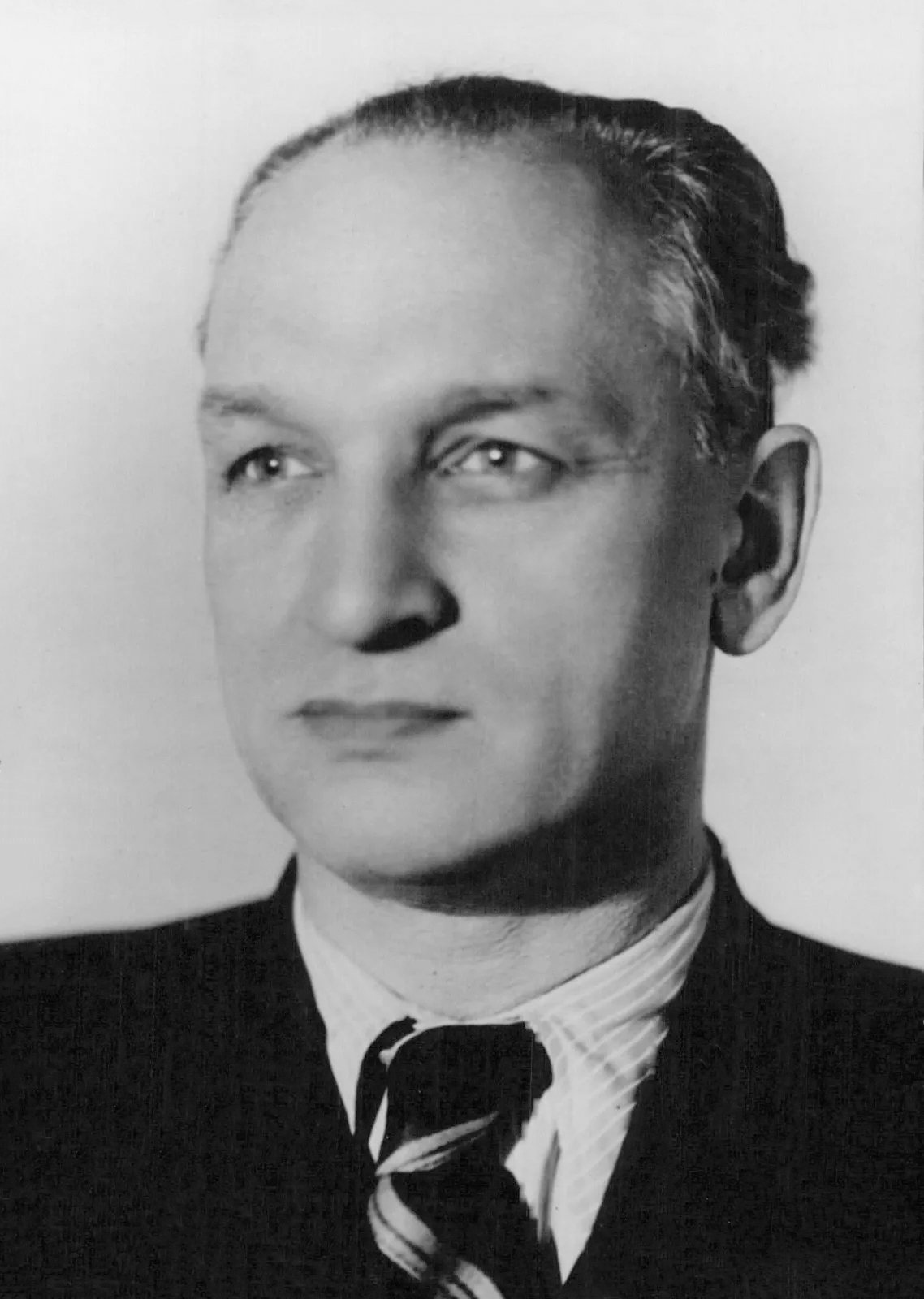
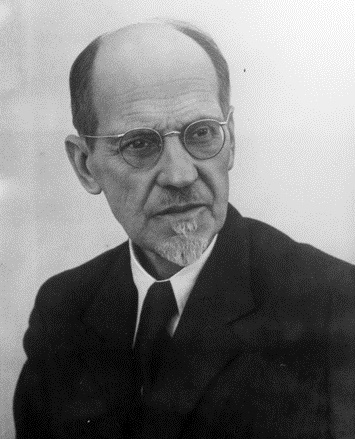
Leaders appointed to head the Soviet-backed governments of Estonia, Lithuania, and Latvia following the Soviet occupation in June 1940. From left to right: Johannes Vares, Justas Paleckis, Augusts Kirhenšteins.

Additional Soviet troops entered Estonia on 17 June 1940. By 21 June, there were over 100,000 Soviet military personnel in the country. The government of Prime Minister Jüri Uluots resigned on 18 June. Andrei Zhdanov arrived in Tallinn on 19 June as Moscow's emissary and dictated the composition of the new government to President Päts. On 21 June, Päts, under pressure from Zhdanov, appointed a government headed by the physician and poet Johannes Vares.

The Estonian Communist Party, which was illegal at the time, had only 133 members. Soviet emissaries chose politically inexperienced figures for leadership positions: Vares in Estonia, Justas Paleckis in Lithuania and Augusts Kirhenšteins in Latvia. The change of government on 21 June was accompanied by demonstrations in Tallinn, which Soviet-era accounts later portrayed as a mass uprising. In fact, according to historians, the demonstrations were smaller than claimed and included Soviet soldiers and Russian workers driven to the capital and dressed in civilian clothing.

An armed clash occurred in Tallinn on the night of 21 June, after an Estonian communications battalion that had been ousted from its barracks opened fire. The clash ended after the arrival of the Vares government's minister of war and Red Army armored cars. The military occupation of Estonia was completed within days, and the headquarters of the 8th Army was relocated to Tartu.

== Rigged elections and annexation ==
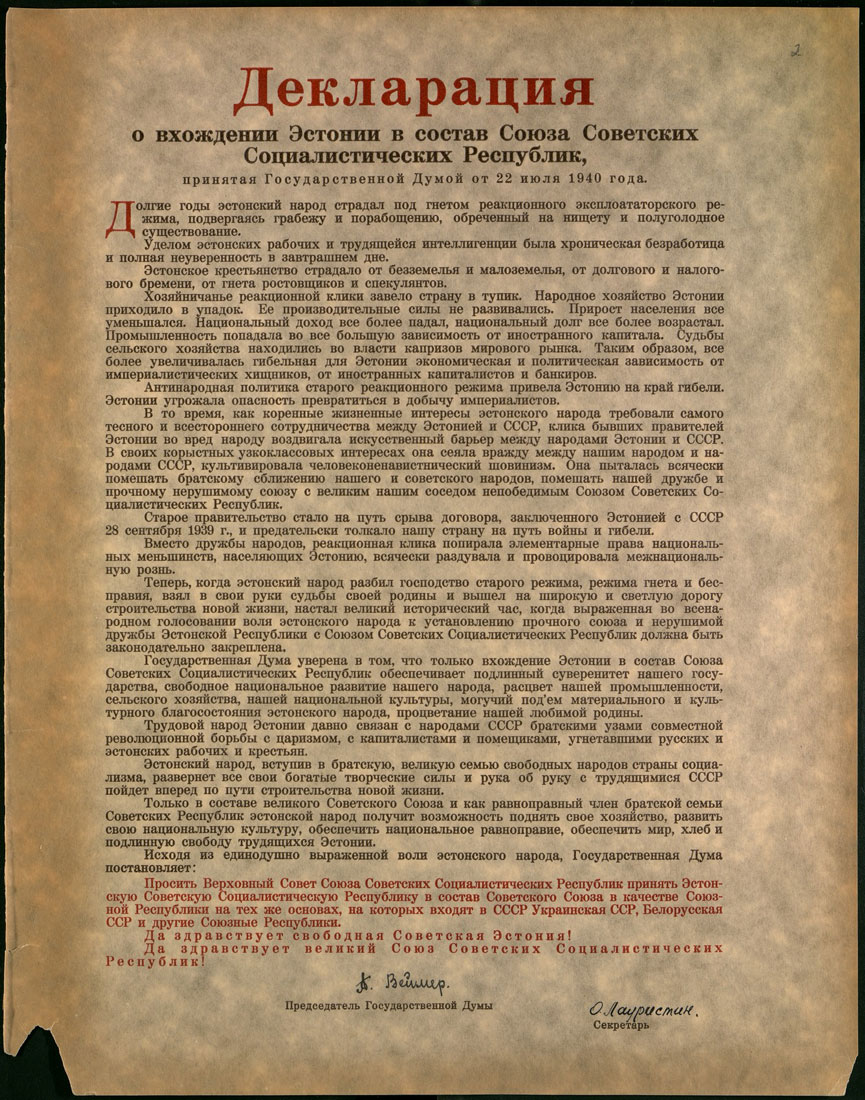
Declaration on the Incorporation of Estonia into the USSR.

The new Soviet-directed government organized parliamentary elections on 14–15 July 1940. In all three Baltic states, only one election ticket was permitted: the "working people's bloc", dominated by communists under the direction of Soviet commissars. Other tickets were rejected on technical grounds. The campaign was accompanied by mass arrests of former officials, officers, clergymen and others suspected of opposing the new order, and threats that abstaining voters would be treated as enemies of the people.

The new "parliaments" convened on 21–22 July, declared Estonia a soviet socialist republic and applied for admission to the Soviet Union. Estonia's request was accepted by the Supreme Soviet of the USSR on 6 August 1940. The decisions of the Vares government and the July "parliament" were directed by Soviet representatives in Tallinn according to directives of the Politburo of the Communist Party of the Soviet Union.

== Aftermath ==
President Päts was deported to Ufa on 30 July 1940 and later died in a Soviet psychiatric hospital in 1956. General Johan Laidoner, commander-in-chief of the Estonian armed forces, was deported to Penza on 17 July 1940 and died in prison in 1953. The Estonian army was reorganized as a Red Army territorial corps in August 1940. From June to August 1940, over 300 people were arrested by Soviet security forces; subsequent political repression, mass arrests and the June 1941 deportations followed.

The Estonian International Commission for Investigation of Crimes Against Humanity concluded that the USSR occupied Estonia on 17 June 1940 by threat of military force, that the "voluntary" joining of the Baltic states with the Soviet Union was staged, and that the annexation was illegal. Tannberg and Tarvel similarly describe the events as a carefully planned military occupation in which the Red Army was prepared for full-scale action against the Baltic states.

== the "June Myth" ==
After the occupation, Soviet historians and the press constructed what later Estonian historians have called the "June Myth". According to this narrative, the events of 21 June 1940 were a voluntary and spontaneous revolution by the Estonian working people, led by the Communist Party and unassisted by Soviet military force. The Soviet press presented the change of government as the "turn of June", a decisive, irreversible turning point in Estonian history. The role of the Red Army was omitted or minimized, and photographs and documents were altered to remove Soviet soldiers and tanks.
